= Martinique =

Overseas department and region of France in the Caribbean

Martinique Matinik or Matnik (Martinican French Creole) Madinina or Madiana (Kalinago)
- Overseas department, region and single territorial collectivity of France and outermost region of the European Union
- Territorial Collectivity of Martinique; Collectivité Territoriale de Martinique (French)
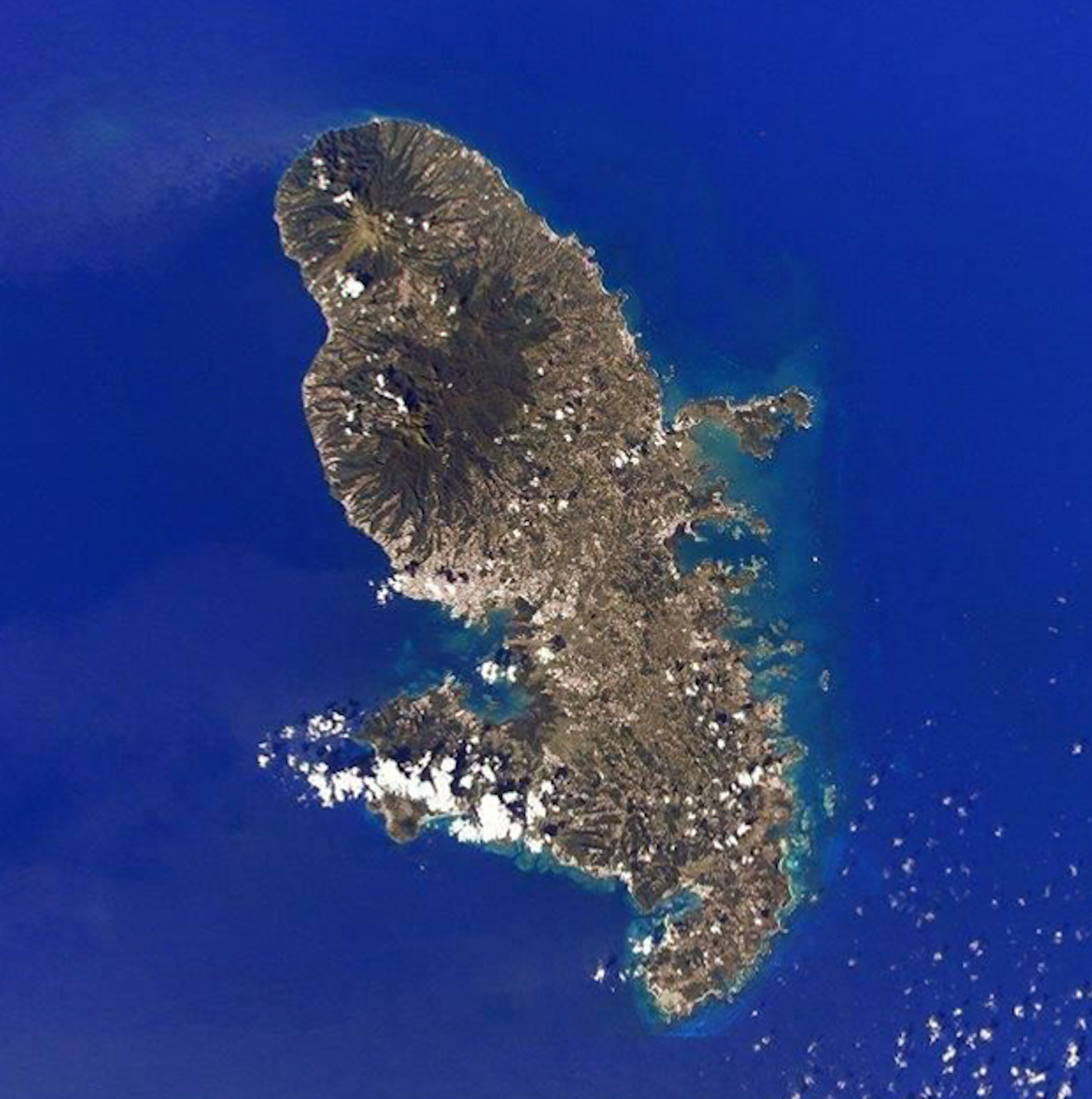
- Martinique

- Flag Emblem
- Anthem: La Marseillaise ("The Marseillaise") Local anthem: Ansanm
- Coordinates: 14°39′00″N 61°00′54″W
- Sovereign state: France
- Prefecture: Fort-de-France
- Departments: 1

Government
  - President of Executive Council: Serge Letchimy (PPM)
  - Legislature: Assembly of Martinique

Area
  - Total: 1,128 km^{2} (436 sq mi)
  - Rank: 17th region
- Highest elevation (Mont Pelée): 1,397 m (4,583 ft)

Population (1 January 2024)
  - Total: 349,925
  - Density: 310.2/km^{2} (803.5/sq mi)
  - Ethnic groups: 80% Afro-Caribbean/Creole; 10% Indian; 5% European/Béké; 5% Arab/Chinese/Jewish
  - Religion: 96.04% Christianity; 84.67% Catholicism; 7.23% Protestantism; 0.51% Baháʼí; 0.24% Hinduism; 0.22% Islam; 2.73% irreligion; 0.26% other
- Demonym(s): Martinican (English); Martiniquais (m); Martiniquaise (f) (French)

Language
  - Official language: French
  - Vernacular language: Martinican French Creole

GDP
  - Total: €10.480 billion (2024)
  - Per capita: €29,192 (2024)
- Time zone: UTC−04:00 (AST)
- ISO 3166 code: MQ; FR-972
- Currency: Euro (€) (EUR)
- Website: Prefecture, Territorial collectivity

Martinique (/ˌmɑːrtɪˈniːk/ MAR-tin-EEK, French pronunciation: [maʁtinik]; Martinican Creole: Matinik or Matnik; Kalinago: Madinina or Madiana) is an island in the Lesser Antilles of the West Indies, in the eastern Caribbean Sea. A part of the French West Indies (Antilles), Martinique is an overseas department and region and a single territorial collectivity of France.

It is a part of the European Union as an outermost region within the special territories of members of the European Economic Area, but is not part of the Schengen Area or the European Union Customs Union. The currency in use is the euro. It has been a UNESCO Biosphere Reserve since 2021 for its entire land and sea territory. In September 2023, the volcanoes and forests of Mount Pelée and the peaks of northern Martinique, in particular the Pitons du Carbet, were listed as UNESCO World Heritage Sites.

Martinique has a land area of 1,128 km^{2} (436 sq mi) and a population of 349,925 inhabitants as of January 2024. One of the Windward Islands, it lies directly north of Saint Lucia, northwest of Barbados and south of Dominica. Virtually the entire population speaks both French (the sole official language) and Martinican Creole.

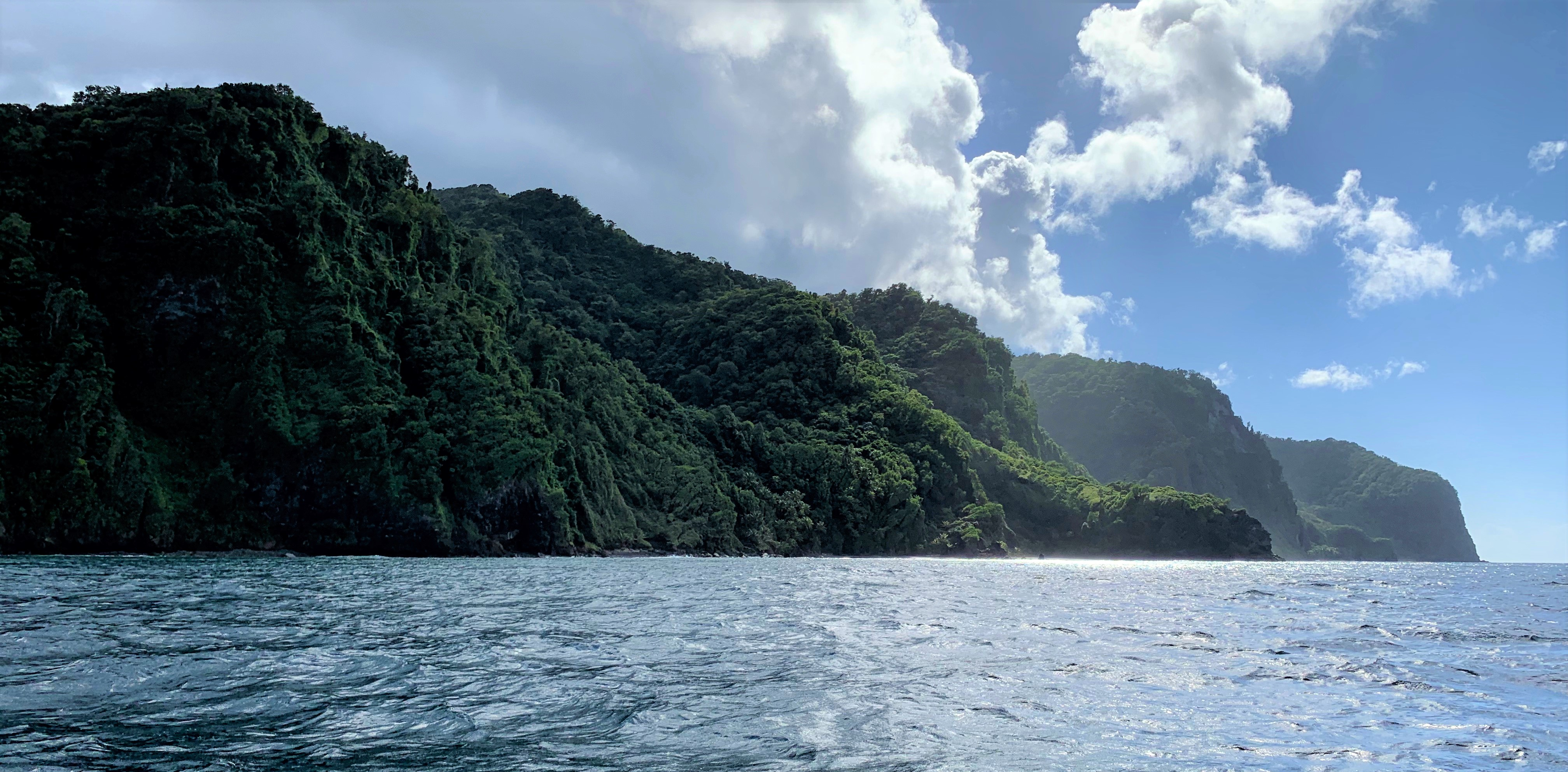
The Cape Saint Martin cliffs and the Dominica channel, as seen from Grand Rivière at the northern tip of the island

== Etymology ==
It is thought that Martinique is a corruption of the Indigenous name for the island (Madiana/Madinina, meaning 'island of flowers', or Matinino, 'island of women'), as relayed by the Kalinago to Christopher Columbus when he visited the island in 1502. According to historian Sydney Daney, the island was called Jouanacaëra or Iouanacaera by the Kalinago, which means 'the island of iguanas'.

== History ==
=== Pre-European contact and early colonial periods ===
The island was occupied first by the Saladoid, then by Kalinago people. The Saladoid came from the South America Orinoco Basin in the 1st century AD and the Kalinago came from the Venezuelan coast around the 11th century.

Christopher Columbus charted Martinique (without landing) in 1493, during his second voyage, but Spain had little interest in the territory. Columbus landed during a later voyage, on 15 June 1502, after a 21-day trade wind passage, his fastest ocean voyage. He spent three days there refilling his water casks, bathing and washing laundry.

The Indigenous people encountered by Columbus called Martinique "Matinino". He was told by Indigenous people of San Salvador that "the island of Matinino was entirely populated by women on whom the Caribs descended at certain seasons of the year; and if these women bore sons they were entrusted to the father to bring up."

In 1635, Spain formally ceded Martinique to France after 133 years of Spanish rule. On 15 September 1635, Pierre Belain d'Esnambuc, French governor of the island of St. Kitts, landed in the harbour of St. Pierre with 80 to 150 French settlers after being driven off St. Kitts by the English. D'Esnambuc claimed Martinique for the French king Louis XIII and the French "Compagnie des Îles de l'Amérique" (Company of the American Islands), and established the first European settlement at Fort Saint-Pierre (now St. Pierre). D'Esnambuc died in 1636, leaving the company and Martinique in the hands of his nephew, Jacques Dyel du Parquet, who in 1637 became governor of the island.

In 1636, in the first of many skirmishes, the Indigenous Kalinago rose against the settlers to drive them off the island. The French repelled the natives and forced them to retreat to the eastern part of the island, on the Caravelle Peninsula in the region then known as the Capesterre. When the Kalinago revolted against French rule in 1658, the governor Charles Houël du Petit Pré retaliated with war against them. Many were killed, and those who survived were taken captive and expelled from the island. Some Kalinago fled to Dominica or St. Vincent, where the French agreed to leave them at peace.

After the death of du Parquet in 1658, his widow Marie Bonnard du Parquet tried to govern Martinique, but dislike of her rule led King Louis XIV to take over the sovereignty of the island. In 1654, Dutch Jews expelled from Portuguese Brazil introduced sugar plantations worked by large numbers of enslaved Africans.

In 1667, the Second Anglo-Dutch War spilled out into the Caribbean, with Britain attacking the pro-Dutch French fleet in Martinique, virtually destroying it and further cementing British preeminence in the region. In 1674, the Dutch attempted to conquer the island, but were repulsed.

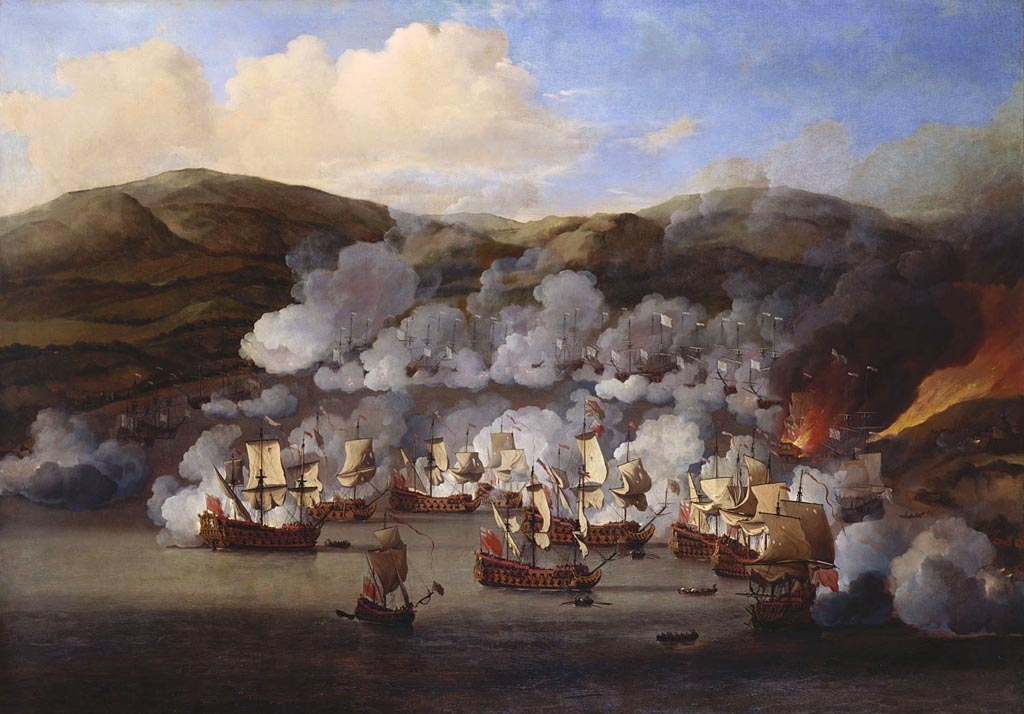
The attack on the French ships at Martinique in 1667

Because there were few Catholic priests in the French Antilles, many of the earliest French settlers were Huguenots who sought religious freedom. Others were transported there as a punishment for refusing to convert to Catholicism, many of them dying en route. Those who survived were quite industrious and over time prospered, though the less fortunate were reduced to the status of indentured servants. Although edicts from King Louis XIV's court regularly came to the islands to suppress the Protestant "heretics", these were mostly ignored by island authorities until Louis XIV's Edict of Revocation in 1685.

As many of the planters on Martinique were Huguenots suffering under the harsh strictures of the Revocation, they began plotting to emigrate from Martinique with many of their recently arrived brethren. Many of them were encouraged by the Catholics, who looked forward to their departure and the opportunities for seizing their property. By 1688, nearly all of Martinique's French Protestant population had escaped to the British American colonies or Protestant countries in Europe. The policy decimated the population of Martinique and the rest of the French Antilles and set back their colonisation by decades, causing the French king to relax his policies in the region, which left the islands susceptible to British occupation over the next century.

=== Post-1688 period ===
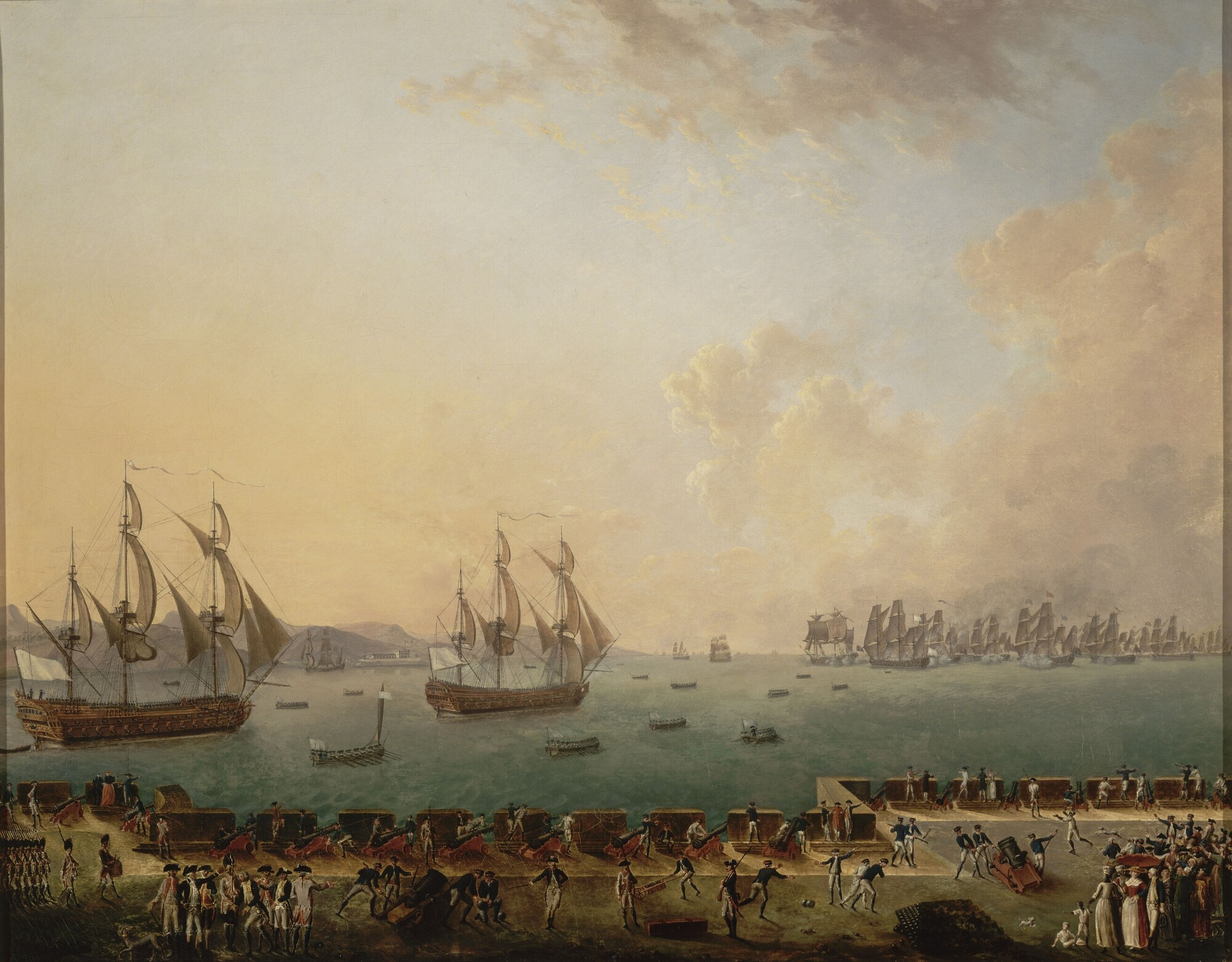
The Battle of Martinique between British and French fleets in 1779

Under governor of the Antilles Charles de Courbon, comte de Blénac, Martinique served as a home port for French pirates, including Captain Crapeau, Étienne de Montauban, and Mathurin Desmarestz. In later years, pirate Bartholomew Roberts styled his jolly roger as a black flag depicting a pirate standing on two skulls labeled "ABH" and "AMH" for "A Barbadian's Head" and "A Martinican's Head" after governors of those two islands sent warships to capture Roberts.

On 28 November 1717 the pirate Blackbeard and his pirates captured a French frigate named La Concorde near the island of Martinique in the West Indies. After selling her cargo of slaves on the island, Blackbeard made the vessel his flagship, added more heavy cannons and renamed her Queen Anne's Revenge.

Martinique was attacked or occupied several times by the British, in 1693, 1759, 1762 and 1779. Excepting a period from 1802 to 1809 following signing of the Treaty of Amiens, Britain controlled the island for most of the time from 1794 to 1815, when it was traded back to France at the conclusion of the Napoleonic Wars. Martinique has remained a French possession since then.

Despite the introduction of successful coffee plantations to Martinique in the 1720s, making it the first coffee-growing area in the Western hemisphere, the planter class lost political influence as sugar prices declined in the early 1800s. Slave rebellions in 1789, 1815 and 1822, plus the campaigns of abolitionists such as Cyrille Bissette and Victor Schœlcher, persuaded the French government to end slavery in the French West Indies in 1848. Martinique was the first French overseas territory in which the abolition decree came into force, on 23 May 1848.

As a result, some plantation owners imported workers from India and China. Despite the abolition of slavery, life scarcely improved for most Martinicans; class and racial tensions exploded into rioting in southern Martinique in 1870 following the arrest of Léopold Lubin, a trader of African ancestry who retaliated after he was beaten by a Frenchman. After several deaths, the revolt was crushed by French militia.

=== 20th–21st centuries ===
On 8 May 1902, Mont Pelée erupted and completely destroyed St. Pierre, killing 30,000 people. Refugees from Martinique travelled by boat to the southern villages of Dominica, and some of them remained permanently on the island. The only survivor in the town of Saint-Pierre, Ludger Sylbaris, was saved by the thick walls of his prison cell. Shortly thereafter, the capital shifted to Fort-de-France, where it remains.

During World War II, the pro-Nazi Vichy government controlled Martinique under Admiral Georges Robert. German U-boats used Martinique for refuelling and re-supply during the Battle of the Caribbean. In 1942, 182 ships were sunk in the Caribbean, dropping to 45 in 1943, and five in 1944. Free French forces took over on the island on Bastille Day, 14 July 1943.

In 1946, the French National Assembly voted unanimously to transform the colony into an Overseas Department of France. Meanwhile, the post-war period saw a growing campaign for full independence; a notable proponent of this was the author Aimé Césaire, who founded the Progressive Party of Martinique in the 1950s. Tensions boiled over in December 1959 when riots broke out following a racially-charged altercation between two motorists, resulting in three deaths. In 1962, as a result of this and the global turn against colonialism, the strongly pro-independence OJAM (Organisation de la jeunesse anticolonialiste de la Martinique) was formed. Its leaders were later arrested by the French authorities. However, they were later acquitted. Tensions rose again in 1974, when gendarmes shot dead two striking banana workers. However the independence movement lost steam as Martinique's economy faltered in the 1970s, resulting in large-scale emigration. Hurricanes in 1979–80 severely affected agricultural output, further straining the economy. Greater autonomy was granted by France to the island in the 1970s–80s.

In 2009, Martinique was convulsed by the French Caribbean general strikes. Initially focusing on cost-of-living issues, the movement soon took on a racial dimension as strikers challenged the continued economic dominance of the Béké, descendants of French European settlers. President Nicolas Sarkozy later visited the island, promising reform. While ruling out full independence, which he said was desired neither by France nor by Martinique, Sarkozy offered Martiniquans a referendum on the island's future status and degree of autonomy.

On 2 February 2023, Martinique adopted its independent activist flag, symbolising its three colours of Pan-Africanism.

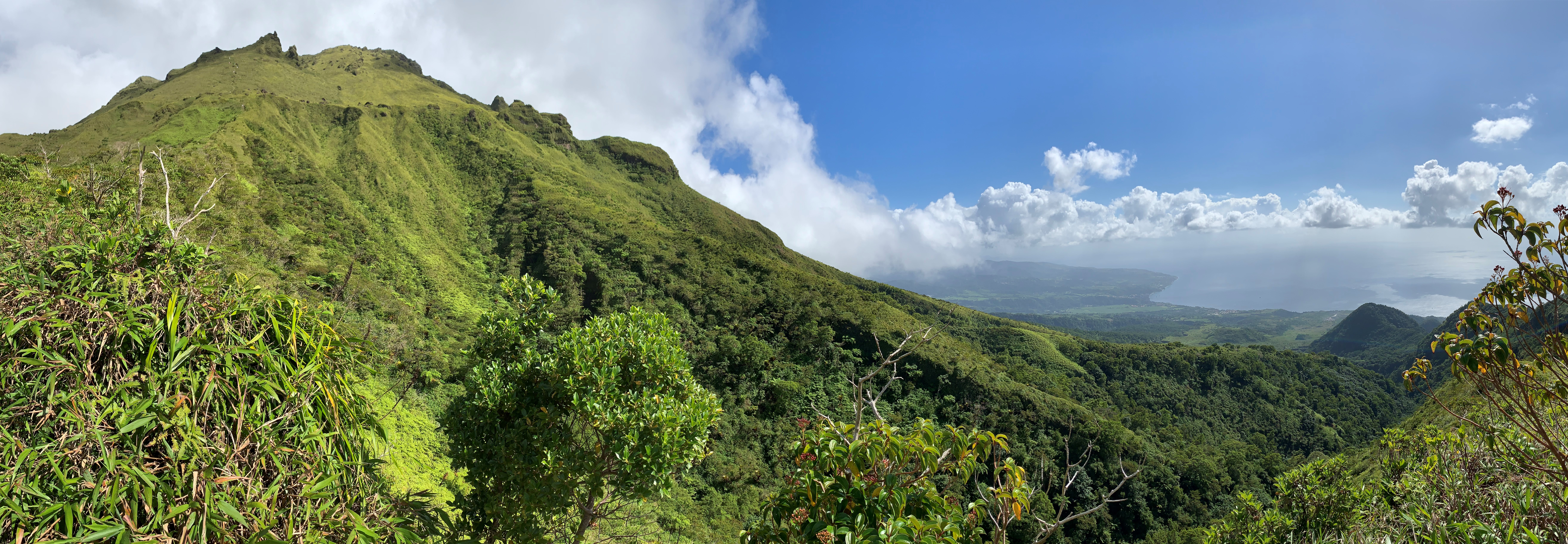
Mont Pelée and Bay of St Pierre as seen from the Grande Savane trail

== Governance ==
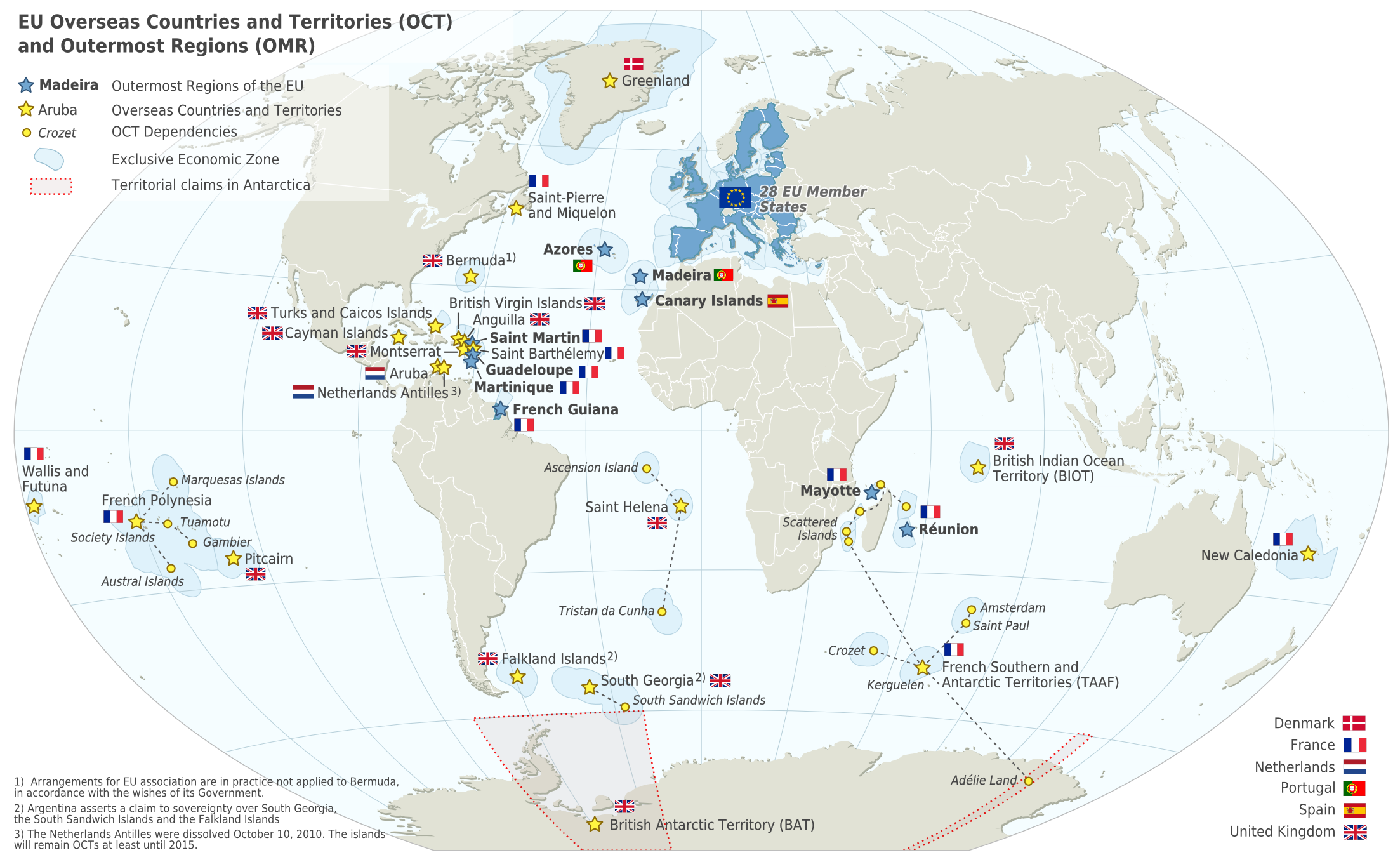
The special territories of the European Union

Like French Guiana, Martinique is a special collectivity (Collectivité territoriale unique in French) of the French Republic. It is also an outermost region of the European Union. The inhabitants of Martinique are French citizens with full political and legal rights. Martinique sends four deputies to the French National Assembly and two senators to the French Senate.

On 24 January 2010, during a referendum, the inhabitants of Martinique approved by 68.4% the change to be a "special (unique) collectivity" within the framework of article 73 of the French Republic's Constitution. The new council replaces and exercises the powers of both the General Council and the regional council.

=== Administrative divisions ===
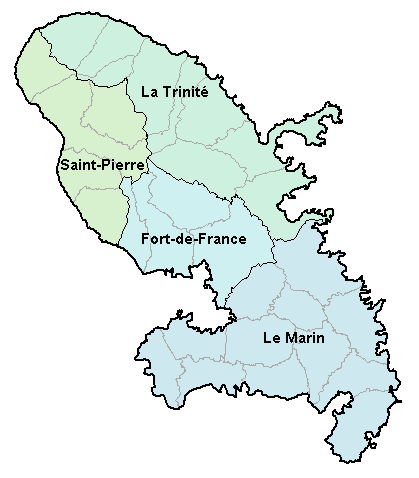
A map of Martinique showing the island's four arrondissements

Martinique is divided into 4 arrondissements and 34 communes. It had also been divided into 45 cantons, but these were abolished in 2015. The four arrondissements of the island, with their respective locations, are as follows:

- Fort-de-France is the prefecture of Martinique. It takes up the central zone of the island. It includes four communes. In 2019, the population was 152,102. Besides the capital, it includes the communities of Saint-Joseph and Schœlcher.
- La Trinité, one of the three subprefectures on the island, occupies the northeast region. It has ten communes. In 2019, the population was 75,238. La Trinité contains the communities of La Trinité, Ajoupa-Bouillon, Basse-Pointe, Le Gros-Morne, Le Lorrain, Macouba, Le Marigot, Le Robert and Sainte-Marie.
- Le Marin, the second subprefecture of Martinique, makes up the southern part of the island and is composed of twelve communes. In 2019, the population was 114,824. The subprefecture includes the communities of La Marin, Les Anses d'Arlet, Le Diamant, Ducos, Le François, Rivière-Pilote, Rivière-Salée, Sainte-Anne, Sainte-Luce, Saint-Esprit, Les Trois-Îlets, and Le Vauclin.
- Saint-Pierre is the third subprefecture of the island. It comprises eight communes, lying in the northwest of Martinique. In 2019, the population was 22,344. In addition to Saint-Pierre, its communities include Le Carbet, Case-Pilote-Bellefontaine, Le Morne-Rouge, and Le Prêcheur.

Name	Area (km^{2})	Population (2019)	Arrondissement	Map
L'Ajoupa-Bouillon	12.3	1,756	La Trinité	
Les Anses-d'Arlet	25.92	3,494	Le Marin	
Basse-Pointe	27.95	2,823	La Trinité	
Bellefontaine	11.89	1,813	Saint-Pierre	
Le Carbet	36	3,461	Saint-Pierre	
Case-Pilote	18.44	4,455	Saint-Pierre	
Le Diamant	27.34	5,511	Le Marin	
Ducos	37.69	17,655	Le Marin	
Fonds-Saint-Denis	24.28	680	Saint-Pierre	
Fort-de-France	44.21	76,512	Fort-de-France	
Le François	53.93	15,980	Le Marin	
Grand'Rivière	16.6	610	La Trinité	
Gros-Morne	54.25	9,689	La Trinité	
Le Lamentin	62.32	40,095	Fort-de-France	
Le Lorrain	50.33	6,768	La Trinité	
Macouba	16.93	1,050	La Trinité	
Le Marigot	21.63	3,117	La Trinité	
Le Marin	31.54	8,751	Le Marin	
Le Morne-Rouge	37.64	4,795	Saint-Pierre	
Le Morne-Vert	13.37	1,816	Saint-Pierre	
Le Prêcheur	29.92	1,203	Saint-Pierre	
Rivière-Pilote	35.78	11,877	Le Marin	
Rivière-Salée	39.38	11,874	Le Marin	
Le Robert	47.3	21,913	La Trinité	
Saint-Esprit	23.46	9,890	Le Marin	
Saint-Joseph	43.29	15,883	Fort-de-France	
Saint-Pierre	38.72	4,121	Saint-Pierre	
Sainte-Anne	38.42	4,444	Le Marin	
Sainte-Luce	28.02	9,487	Le Marin	
Sainte-Marie	44.55	15,487	La Trinité	
Schœlcher	21.17	19,612	Fort-de-France	
La Trinité	45.77	12,025	La Trinité	
Les Trois-Îlets	28.6	7,242	Le Marin	
Le Vauclin	39.06	8,619	Le Marin	

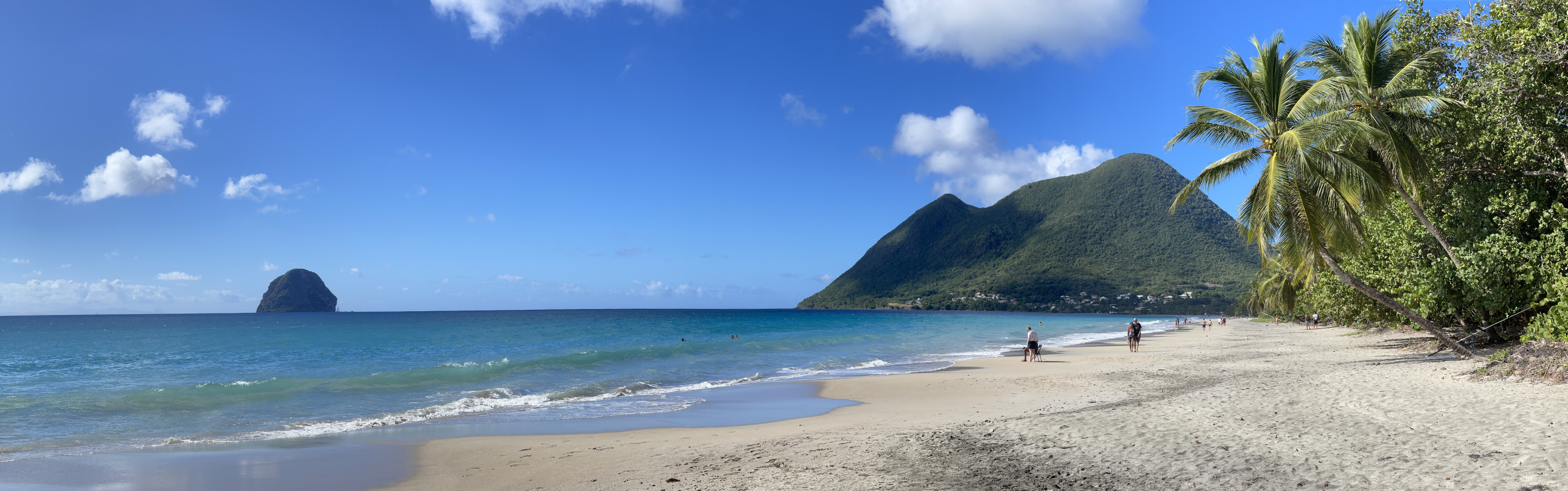
Diamant beach, and Diamond Rock, as seen from Dizac beach

=== Representation of the State ===
The prefecture of Martinique is Fort-de-France. The three sub-prefectures are Le Marin, Saint-Pierre and La Trinité. The French State is represented in Martinique by a prefect (Stanislas Cazelles since 5 February 2020), and by two sub-prefects in Le Marin (Corinne Blanchot-Prosper) and La Trinité / Saint-Pierre (Nicolas Onimus, appointed on 20 May 2020).

=== Institutions ===
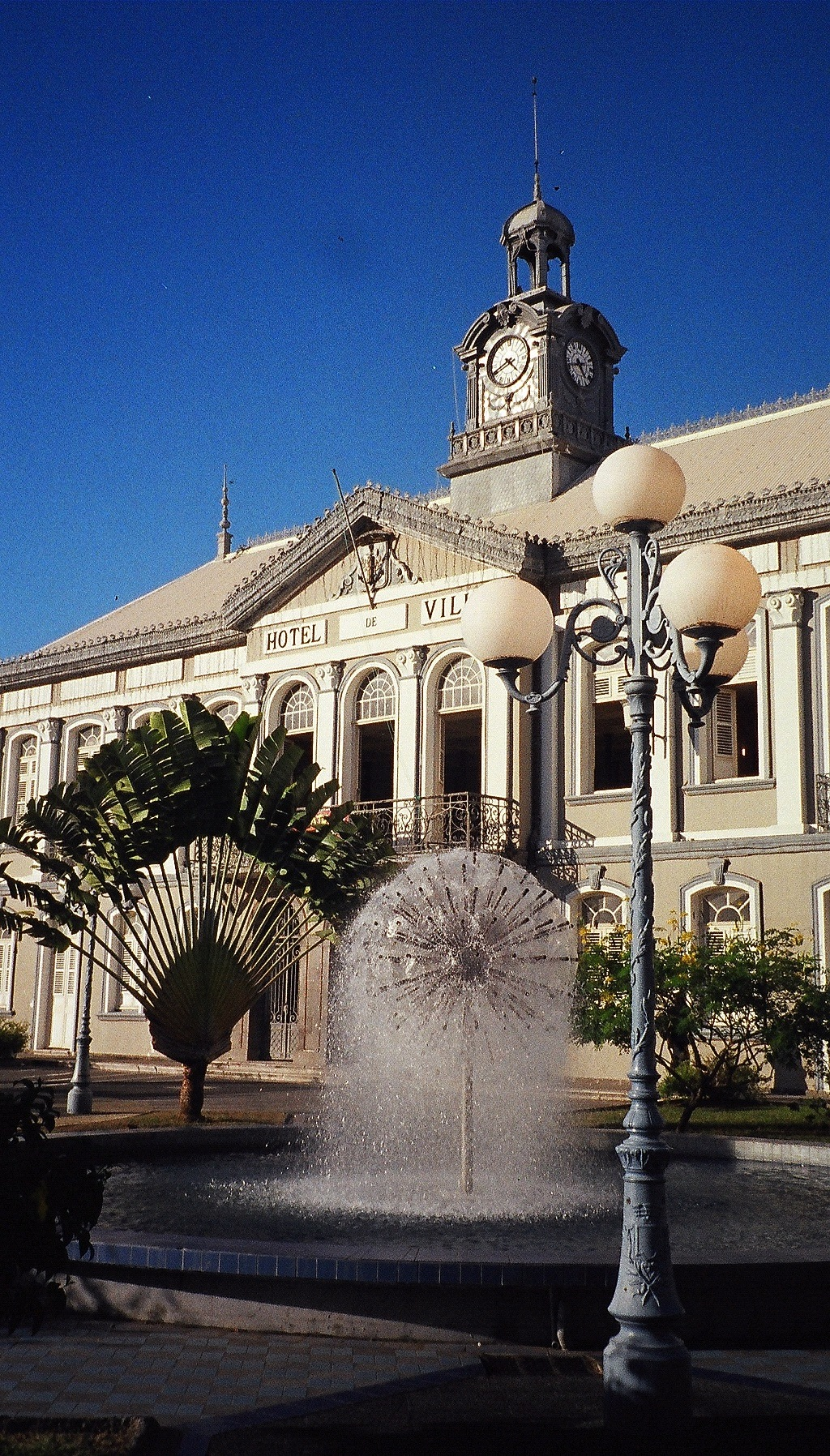
Former town hall or Mayor's office of Fort-de-France

The President of the Executive Council of Martinique is Serge Letchimy as of 2 July 2021.

The Executive Council of Martinique is composed of nine members (a president and eight executive councilors).

The deliberative assembly of the territorial collectivity is the Assembly of Martinique, composed of 51 elected members and chaired by Lucien Saliber as of 2 July 2021.

The advisory council of the territorial collectivity of Martinique is the Economic, Social, Environmental, Cultural and Educational Council of Martinique (Conseil économique, social, environnemental, de la culture et de l'éducation de Martinique), composed of 68 members. Its president is Justin Daniel since 20 May 2021.

Martinique is an associate member of the CARICOM, the Organization of Eastern Caribbean States (OECS), the Association of Caribbean States (ACS), and the Economic Commission for Latin America and the Caribbean (ECLAC).

==== National representation ====
Martinique has been represented since 17 June 2017, in the National Assembly by four deputies (Serge Letchimy, Jean-Philippe Nilor, Josette Manin and Manuéla Kéclard-Mondésir) and in the Senate by two senators (Maurice Antiste and Catherine Conconne) since 24 September 2017.

Martinique is also represented in the Economic, Social and Environmental Council by Pierre Marie-Joseph since 26 April 2021.

=== Institutional and statutory evolution of the island ===
During the 2000s, the political debate in Martinique focused on the question of the evolution of the island's status. Two political ideologies, assimilationism and autonomism, clashed. On the one hand, there are those who want a change of status based on Article 73 of the French Constitution, i.e., that all French laws apply in Martinique as of right, which in law is called legislative identity, and on the other hand, the autonomists who want a change of status based on Article 74 of the French Constitution, i.e., an autonomous status subject to the regime of legislative specialty following the example of St. Martin and St. Barthelemy.

Since the constitutional revision of 28 March 2003, Martinique has four options:

- First possibility: the status quo, Martinique retains its status as an Overseas Department and Region, under Article 73 of the Constitution. The DROMs are under the regime of legislative identity. In this framework, the laws and regulations are applicable as of right, with the adaptations required by the particular characteristics and constraints of the communities concerned.
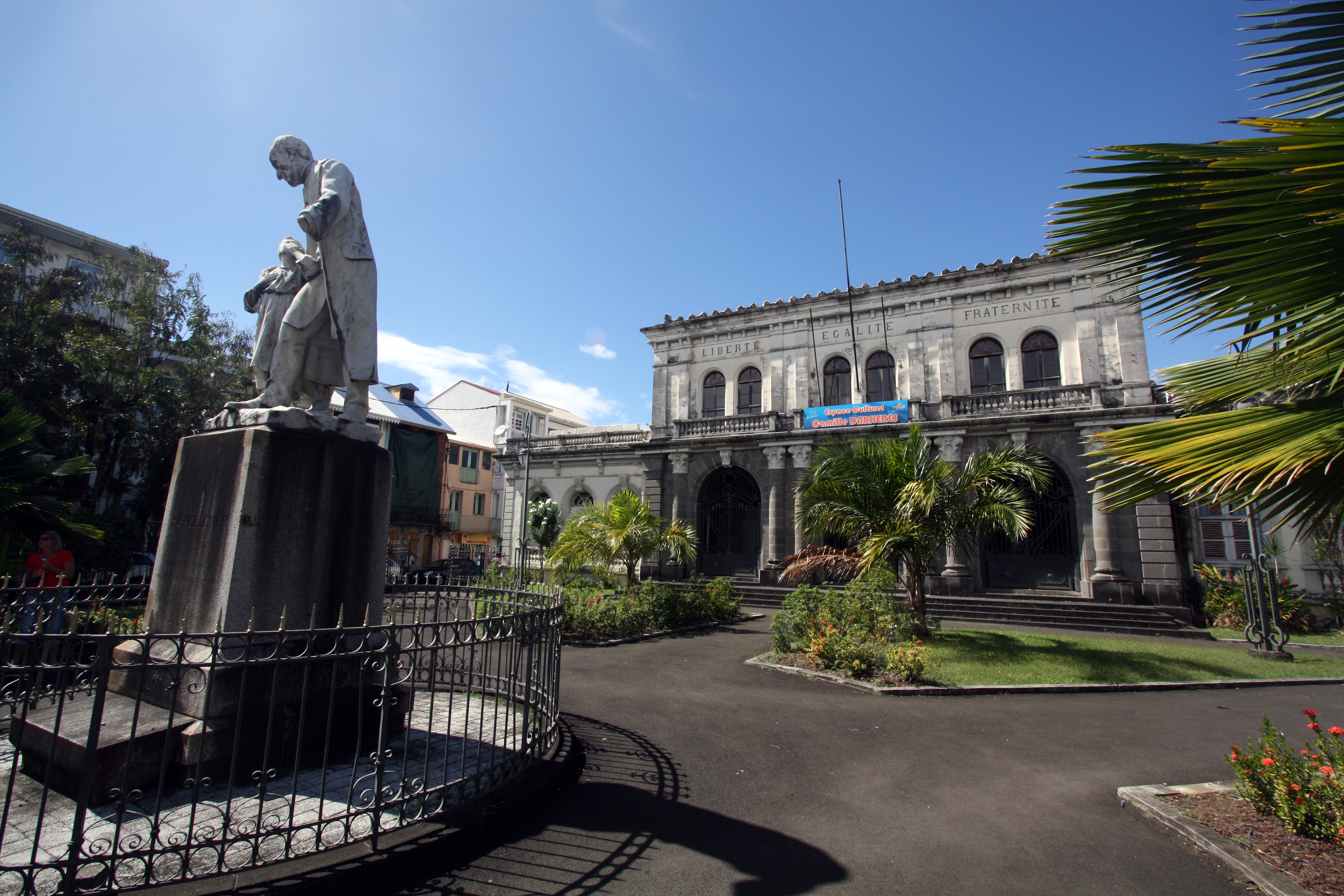
- Old City Hall, Fort-de-France
  Second possibility: if the local stakeholders, and first and foremost the elected representatives, agree, they can, within the framework of Article 73 of the Constitution, propose an institutional evolution such as the creation of a single assembly (merger of the general council and the regional council). However, the department and the region will remain. The government may propose to the President of the Republic to consult the voters on this issue. In case of a negative answer, nothing will be possible. In case of positive response, the final decision will be taken by the Parliament, which will finally decide whether the reform is carried out by passing an ordinary law.
- Third possibility: those elected may propose the creation of a new collectivity within the framework of Article 73 of the French Constitution. This new community will replace the department and the region. It will bring together the competences currently attributed to the General Council and the Regional Council. This community governed by Article 73 is subject to the regime of legislative identity and is therefore not autonomous. It will have as institutions an executive council, a deliberative assembly and an economic and social council.
- Fourth possibility: if a consensus is reached, the elected representatives may propose to the government a change of status, i.e., the transformation of Martinique into an overseas collectivity (COM). Indeed, since the constitutional revision of 28 March 2003, the overseas departments may, under Article 74, become an overseas collectivity (COM) like St. Martin and St. Barthélemy.

Unlike the overseas departments, the overseas collectivities are subject to legislative specialization. The laws and decrees of the Republic apply to them under certain conditions established by the organic law defining their status. The overseas departments have a greater degree of autonomy than the DOMs. They have an executive council, a territorial council and an economic and social council. The prefect is the representative of the French State in the overseas collectivity.

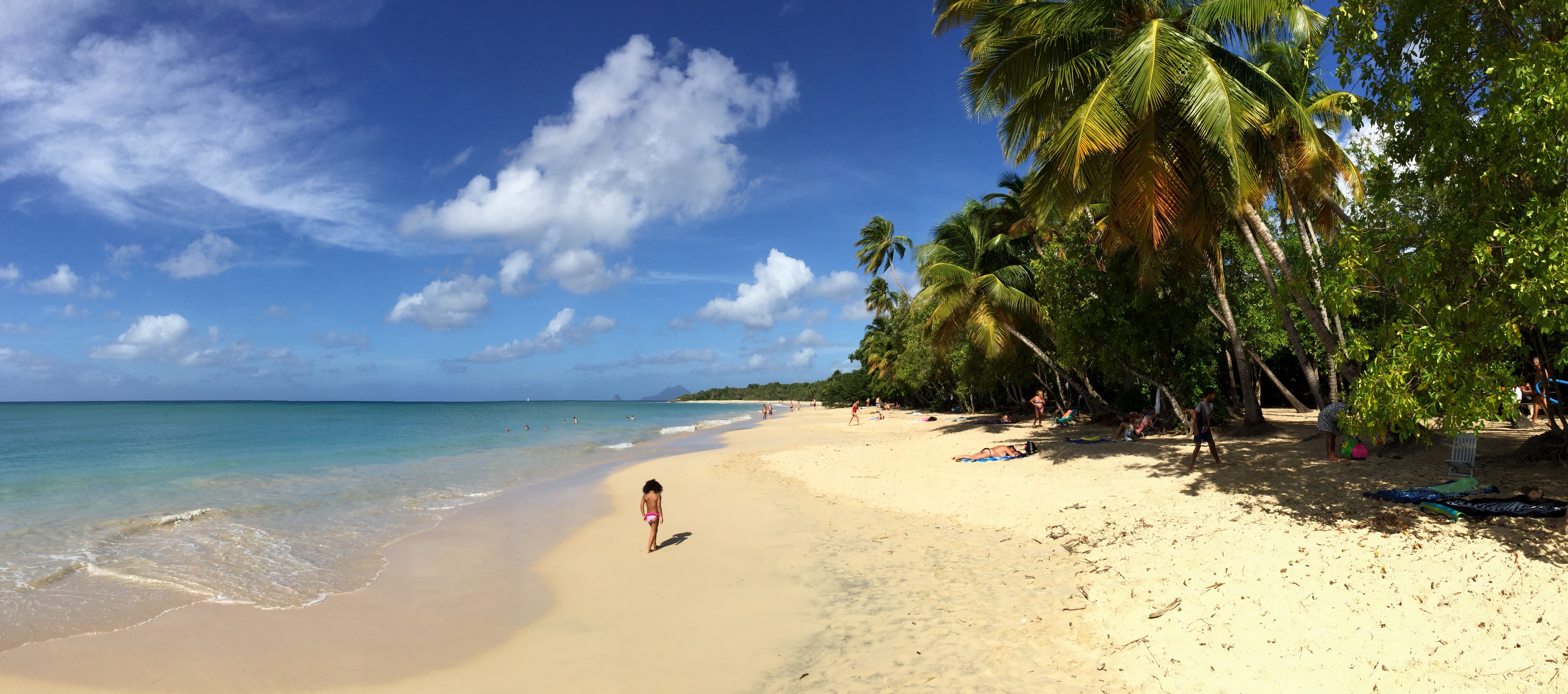
Salines Beach, St Anne peninsula

However, the French Constitution specifies in Article 72-4 that "no change may be made, for all or part of one of the communities mentioned in the second paragraph of Article 72-3, from one of the regimes provided for in Articles 73 and 74, without the prior consent of the electors of the community or part of the community concerned having been obtained, under the conditions provided for in the following paragraph.

In 2003, a new organization is envisaged, in which the regional and departmental institutions would be merged into a single institution. This proposal was rejected in Martinique (but also in Guadeloupe) by 50.48% in a referendum held on 7 December 2003.

On 10 January 2010, a consultation of the population was held. Voters were asked to vote in a referendum on a possible change in the status of their territory. The ballot proposed voters to "approve or reject the transition to the regime provided for in Article 74 of the Constitution". The majority of voters, 79.3%, said "no".

The following 24 January, in a second referendum, 68.4% of the population of Martinique approved the transition to a "single collectivity" under Article 73 of the Constitution, i.e., a single assembly that would exercise the powers of the General Council and the Regional Council.

=== New collectivity of Martinique ===
The project of the elected representatives of Martinique to the government proposes a single territorial community governed by Article 73 of the Constitution, whose name is "Territorial Community of Martinique". The single assembly that replaces the General Council and the Regional Council is called the "Assembly of Martinique". The Assembly of Martinique is composed of 51 councilors, elected for a six-year term of office by the proportional representation system (the electoral district is divided into four sections). A majority bonus of 20% is granted to the first place list.

The executive body of this community is called the "executive council", which is composed of nine executive councilors, including a president. The president of the community of Martinique is the president of the executive council. The executive council is responsible to the Assembly of Martinique, which may overrule it by a motion of constructive censure. Unlike the previous functioning of the General Council and the Regional Council, the Assembly of Martinique is separate from the Executive Council and is headed by a bureau and a president.

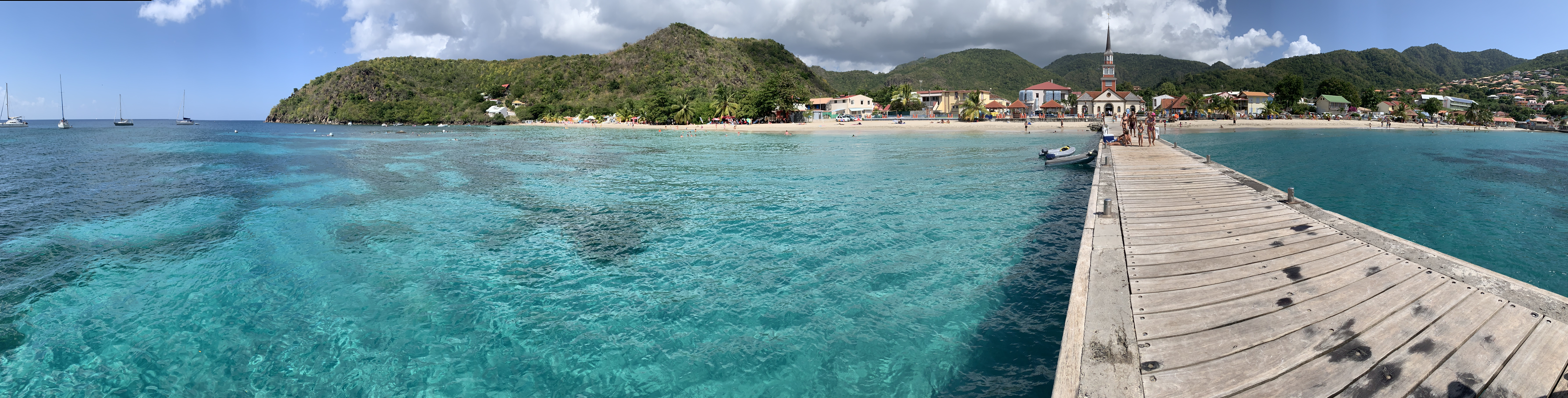
Anses d'Arlet and its churchside beach, a landmark of Martinique

The new collectivity of Martinique combines the powers of the general and regional councils, but may obtain new powers through empowerments under Article 73. The executive council is assisted by an advisory council, the Economic, Social, Environmental, Cultural and Educational Council of Martinique.

The bill was approved on 26 January 2011, by the French Government. The ordinary law was submitted to Parliament during the first half of 2011 and resulted in the adoption of Law No. 2011-884 27 July 2011, on the territorial communities of French Guiana and Martinique.

=== Political forces ===
Political life in Martinique is essentially based on Martinican political parties and local federations of national parties (PS and LR). The following classification takes into account their position with regard to the statutory evolution of the island: there are the assimilationists (in favor of an institutional or statutory evolution within the framework of Article 73 of the French Constitution), the autonomists and the independentists (in favor of a statutory evolution based on Article 74 of the French Constitution).

Indeed, on 18 December 2008, during the congress of Martinique's departmental and regional elected representatives, the thirty-three pro-independence elected representatives (MIM/CNCP/MODEMAS/PALIMA) of the two assemblies voted unanimously in favor of a change in the island's status based on Article 74 of the French Constitution, which allows access to autonomy; this change in status was massively rejected (79.3%) by the population during the referendum of 10 January 2010.

=== Defence ===
The defence of the department is the responsibility of the French Armed Forces. Some 1,400 military personnel are deployed in Martinique and Guadeloupe – centred on the 33e régiment d'infanterie de Marine in Martinique and incorporating a reserve company of the regiment located in Guadeloupe.

Four French Navy vessels are based in Martinique, including: the surveillance frigates Ventôse and Germinal, the patrol and support ship Dumont d'Urville, the Confiance-class patrol vessel and Combattante. A coastal harbor tugboat (RPC), Maïtos, has also been deployed in the territory along with two RP10-class tugboats. The naval aviation element includes two Eurocopter AS565 Panther helicopters able to embark on the two Floréal-class surveillance frigates as required. One Engins de Débarquement Amphibie – Standards (EDA-S) landing craft (Coutelas) is to be delivered to naval forces based in Martinique. The landing craft is to better support operations in the territory and region. About 700 National Gendarmerie are also stationed in Martinique.

== Geography ==
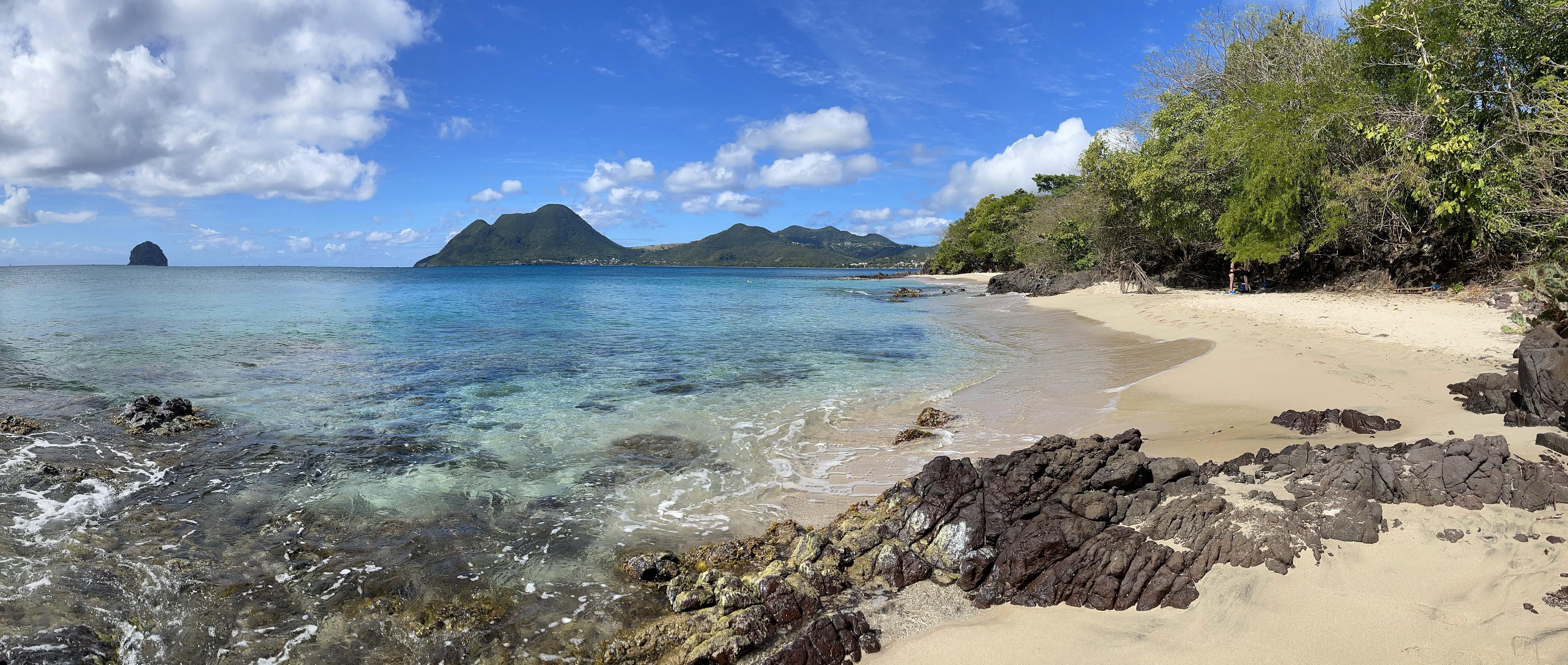
Diamond Rock and the Sleeping Woman, the defining landscape of the southwest peninsula

Part of the archipelago of the Antilles, Martinique is located in the Caribbean Sea about 450 km (280 mi) northeast of the coast of South America and about 700 km (435 mi) southeast of the Dominican Republic. It is north of St. Lucia, northwest of Barbados and south of Dominica. The total area of Martinique is 1,128 km^{2} (436 sq mi), of which 40 km^{2} (15 sq mi) is water and the rest land. Martinique is the 3rd largest island in The Lesser Antilles after Trinidad and Guadeloupe. It stretches 70 km (43 mi) in length and 30 km (19 mi) in width. The highest point is the volcano of Mount Pelée at 1,397 m (4,583 ft) above sea level. There are numerous small islands, particularly off the east coast.

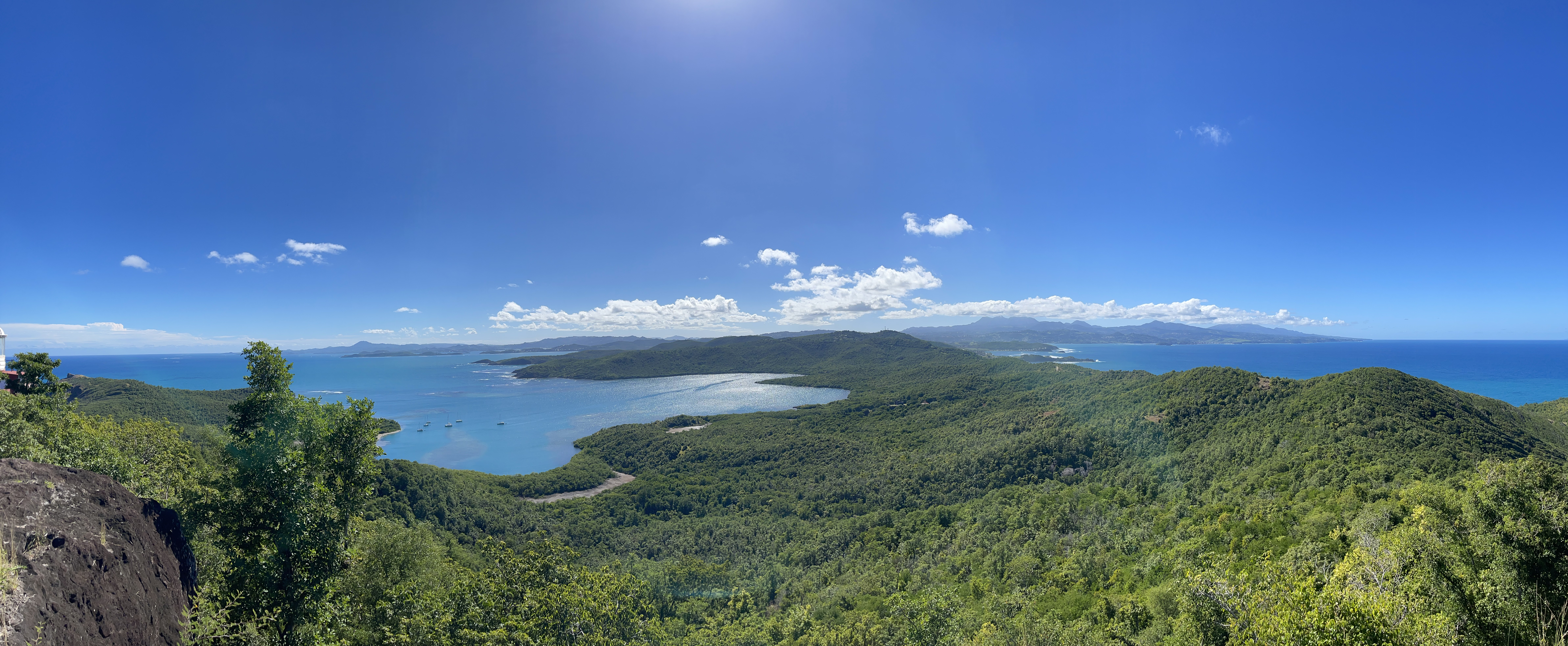
Caravelle Peninsula and Martinique's Atlantic coast, as seen from the Phare de la Caravelle

The Atlantic, or "windward" coast of Martinique is difficult to navigate by ship. A combination of coastal cliffs, shallow coral reefs and cays, and strong winds make the area notoriously hazardous for sea traffic. The Caravelle peninsula clearly separates the north Atlantic and south Atlantic coast.

The Caribbean, or "leeward" coast of Martinique is much more favourable to sea traffic. Besides being shielded from the harsh Atlantic trade winds by the island, the sea bed itself descends steeply from the shore. This ensures that most potential hazards are deep underwater, and prevents the growth of corals.

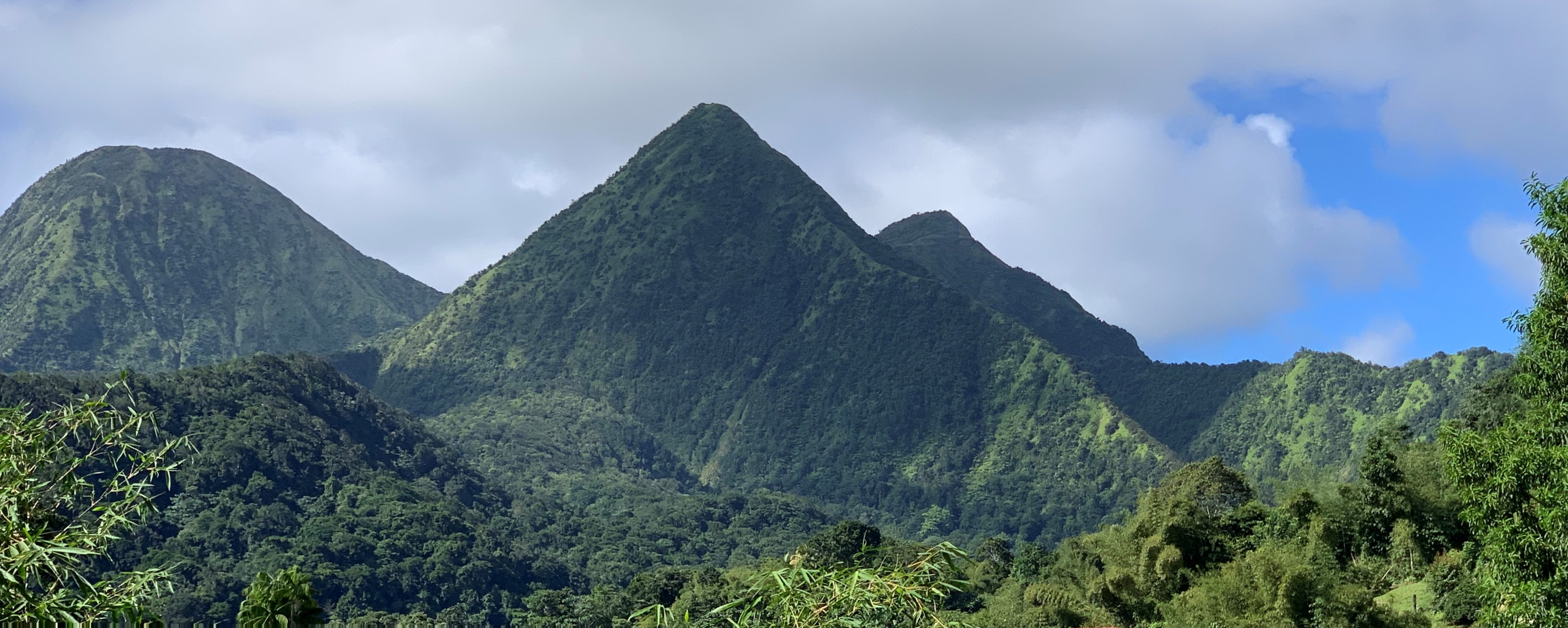
Pitons du Carbet rainforest, as seen from the Fontaine Didier route in Fort de France

The north of the island is especially mountainous. It features four ensembles of pitons (volcanoes) and mornes (mountains): the Piton Conil on the extreme North, which dominates the Dominica Channel; Mont Pelée, an active volcano; the Morne Jacob; and the Pitons du Carbet, an ensemble of five extinct volcanoes covered with rainforest and dominating the Bay of Fort de France at 1,196 m (3,924 ft). Mont Pelée's volcanic ash has created grey and black sand beaches in the north (in particular between Anse Ceron and Anse des Gallets), contrasting markedly from the white sands of Les Salines in the south.

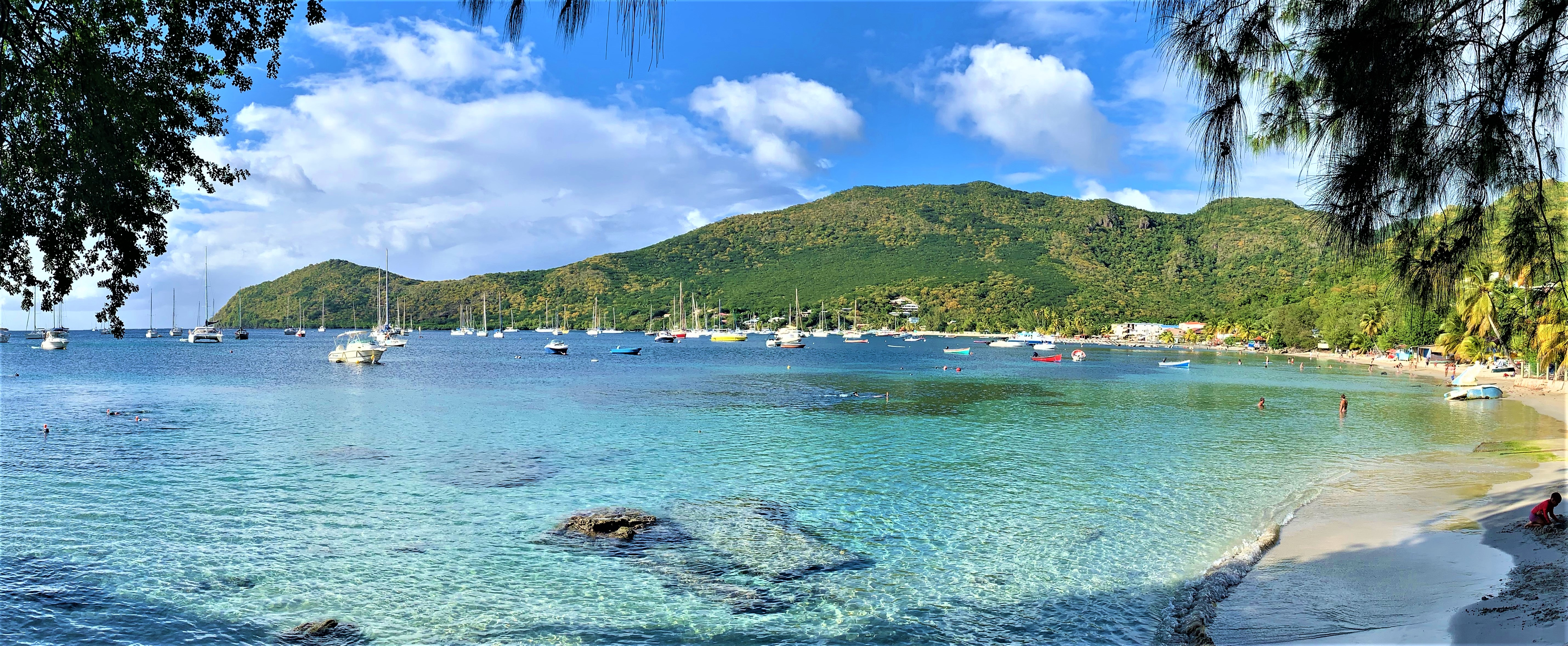
Grand Anse beach, a haven for sea turtles, southwest peninsula

The south is more easily traversed, though it still features impressive geographic features. Because it is easier to travel to, and due to the many beaches and food facilities throughout this region, the south receives most of the tourism. The beaches from Pointe de Bout, through Diamant (which features right off the coast of Roche de Diamant), St. Luce, the department of St. Anne and down to Les Salines are popular.

=== Relief ===
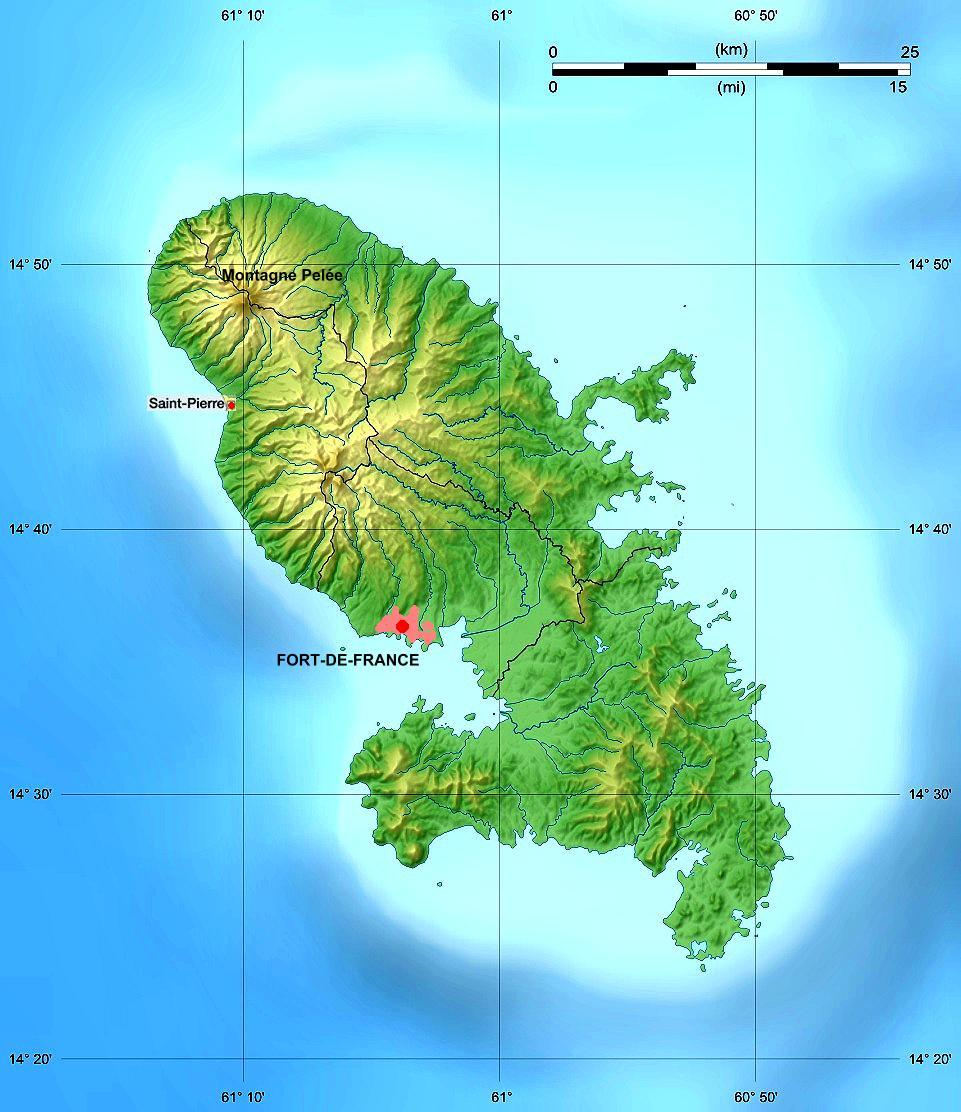
Topographic relief map of Martinique

The terrain is mountainous on this island of volcanic origin. The oldest areas correspond to the volcanic zones at the southern end of the island and towards the peninsula of La Caravelle to the east. The island developed over the last 20 million years according to a sequence of movements and volcanic eruptions to the north.

The volcanic activity is due to the subduction fault located here, where the South American Plate slides beneath the Caribbean Plate. Martinique has eight centres of volcanic activity. The oldest rocks are andesitic lavas dated to about 24 million years ago, mixed with tholeiitic magma containing iron and magnesium. Mount Pelée, the island's most dramatic feature, formed about 400,000 years ago. Pelée erupted in 1792, 1851, and twice in 1902. The eruption of 8 May 1902, destroyed Saint-Pierre and killed 28,000 people in 2 minutes; that of 30 August 1902, killed nearly 1,100, mostly in Le Morne-Rouge and Ajoupa-Bouillon.

The east coast, coast of the wind or of the islands, has been called in the Caribbean "cabesterre". This term in Martinique designates more specifically the area of La Caravelle. This windward coast, bordered by the Atlantic Ocean, is directly exposed to the trade winds and the sea bottom. The northern part of the Grand River in Sainte-Marie is basically surrounded by cliffs, with very few mooring points; access to maritime navigation is limited to inshore fishing with small traditional Martinique boats.

=== Flora and fauna ===
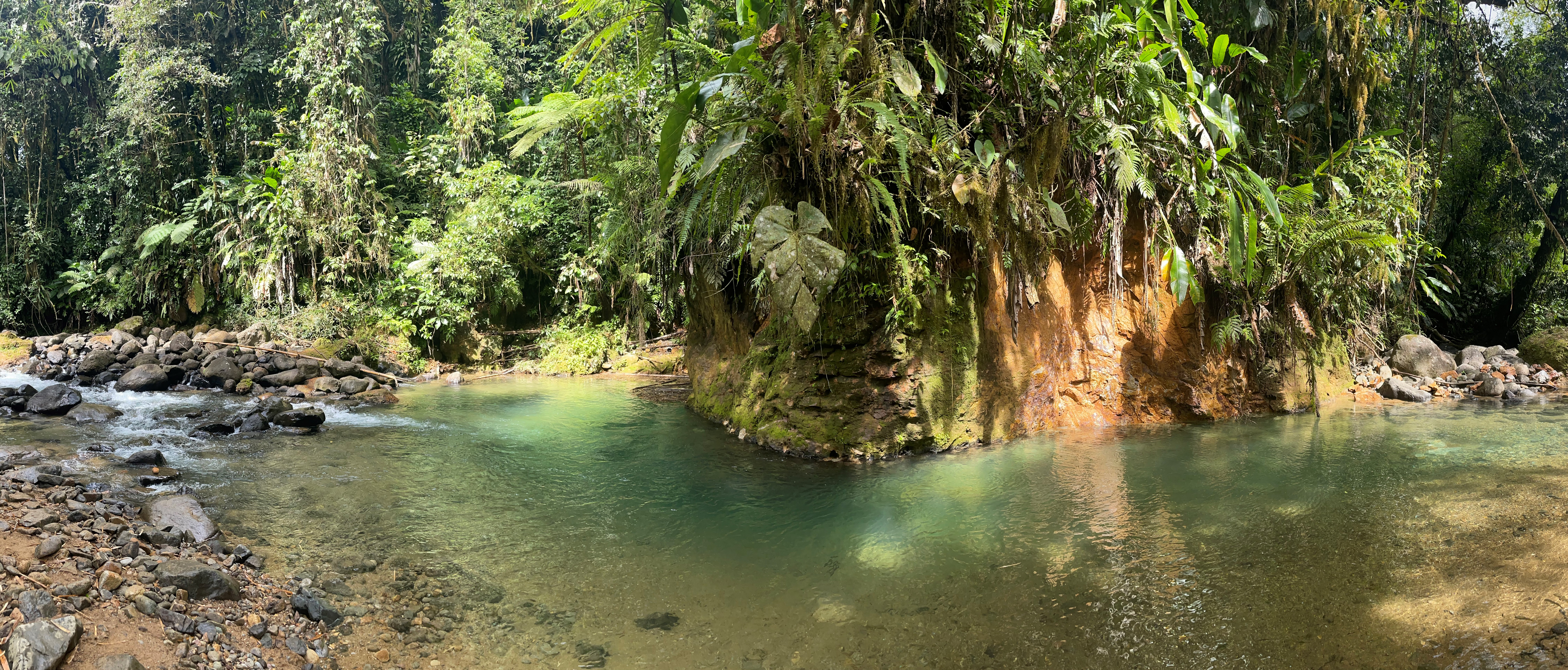
The Trou d'eau of the Pitons du Carbet forest, Rivière du Lorrain, as seen from the Trace des Jésuites trail

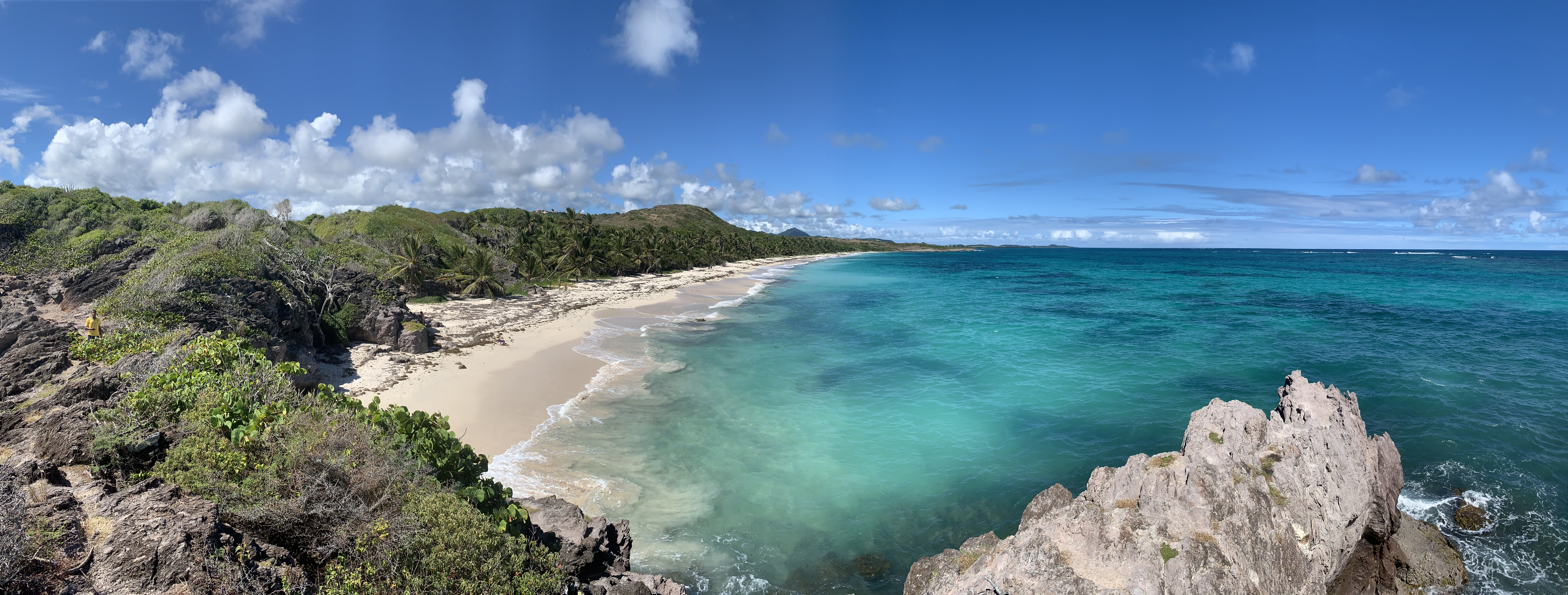
Beach of Anse Grosse Roche, St Anne peninsula

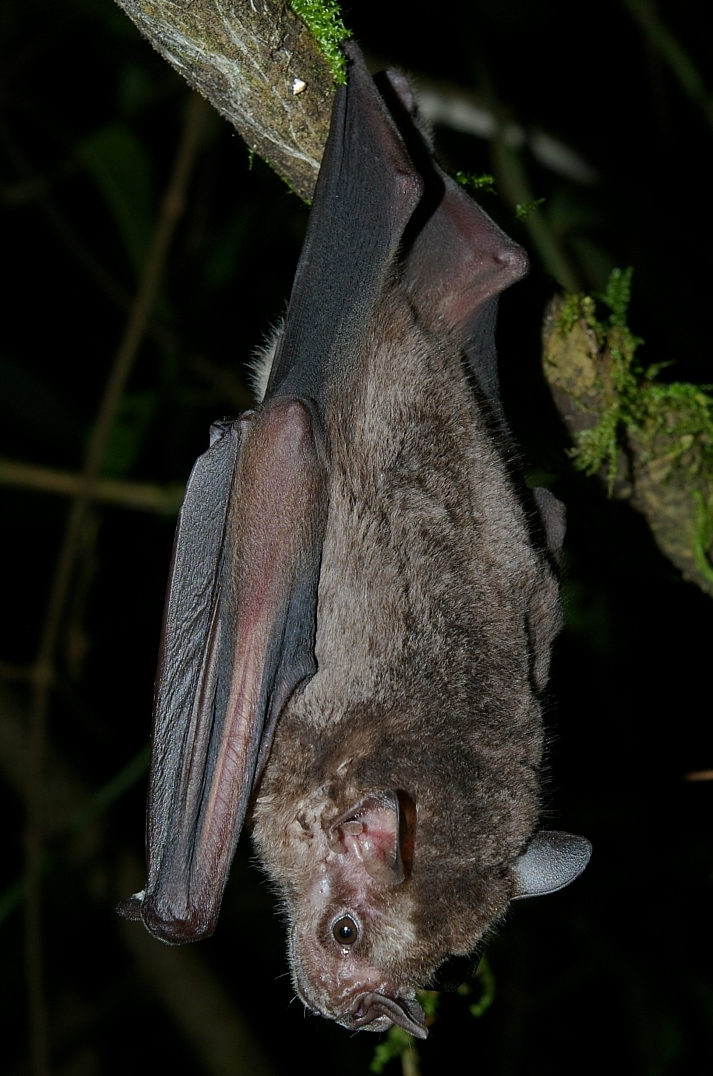
The Jamaican fruit bat can be found throughout the island.

The northern end of the island catches most of the rainfall and is heavily forested, featuring species such as bamboo, mahogany, rosewood and West Indian locust. The south is drier and dominated by savanna-like brush, including cacti, Copaiba balsam, logwood and acacia.

Anole lizards and fer-de-lance snakes are native to the island. Mongooses (Urva auropunctata), introduced in the 1800s to control the snake population, have become a particularly cumbersome introduced species as they prey upon bird eggs and have exterminated or endangered a number of native birds, including the Martinique trembler, white-breasted trembler and White-breasted Thrasher. Bat species include the Jamaican fruit bat, the Antillean fruit-eating bat, the Little yellow-shouldered bat, Davy's naked-backed bat, the Greater bulldog bat, Schwartz's myotis, and the Mexican free-tailed bat.

=== Beaches ===
Martinique has many beaches: those in the south of the island have white sand, unlike those in the north which are of volcanic origin and therefore have black or gray sand.

Most of the beaches are wild, without services and without surveillance, but some are organized and enable water-sports and marine activities.

=== Hydrography ===
Due to the island's geographic and morphological characteristics, it has short and torrential rivers. The Lézarde, 30 km (19 mi) long, is the longest on the island.

=== Major urban areas ===
The most populous urban unit is Le Robert, which covers 11 communes in the southeastern part of the department. The three largest urban units are:

Urban unit	Population (2019)
Le Robert	130,179
Fort-de-France	116,462
Le Lamentin	40,095

== Economy ==
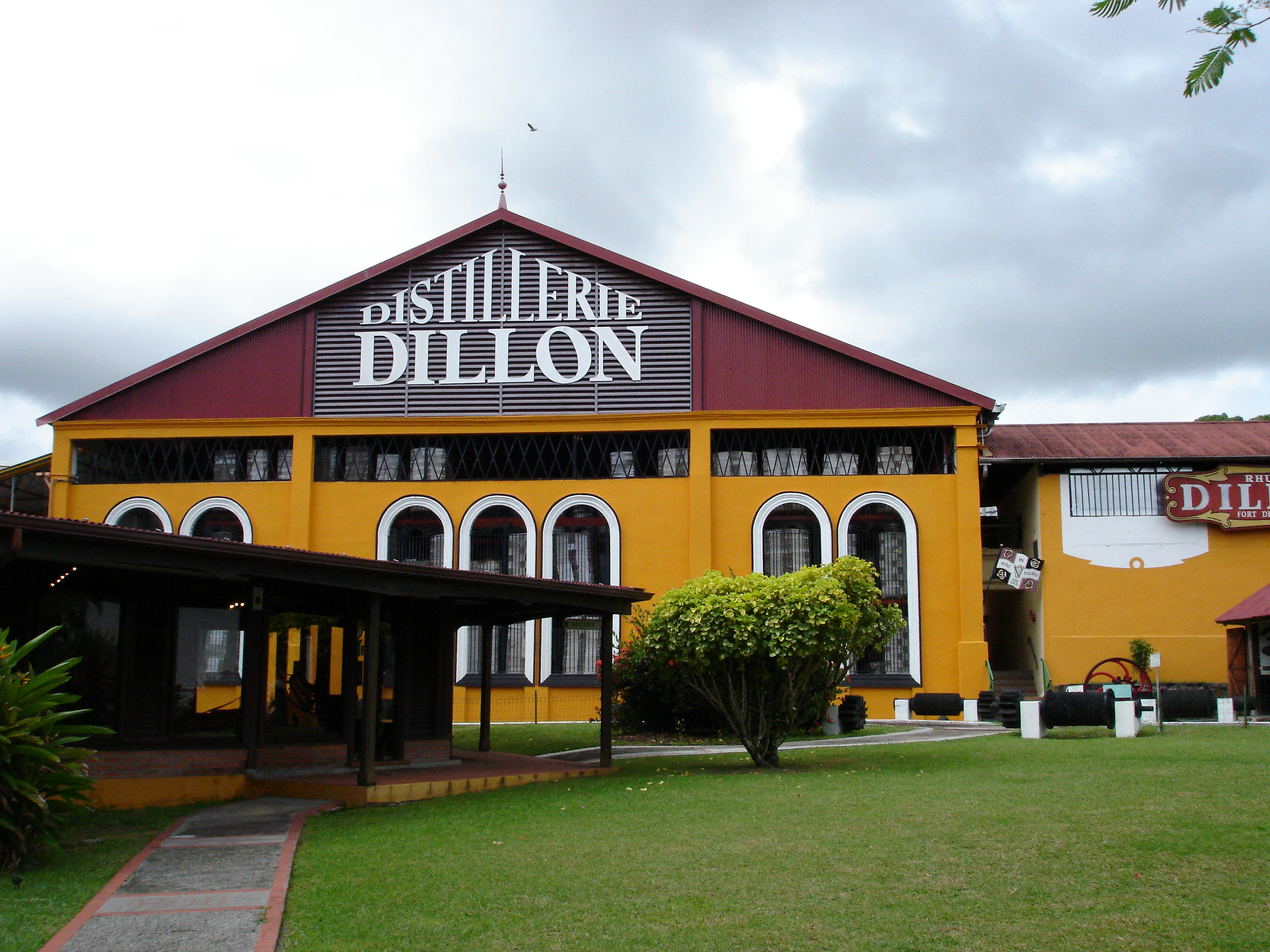
Dillon's distillery

In 2014, Martinique had a total GDP of 8.4 billion euros. Its economy is heavily dependent on tourism, limited agricultural production, and grant aid from mainland France.

Historically, Martinique's economy relied on agriculture, notably sugar and bananas, but by the beginning of the 21st century this sector had dwindled considerably. Sugar production has declined, with most of the sugarcane now used for the production of rum. Banana exports are increasing, going mostly to mainland France. Chlordecone, a pesticide used in the cultivation of bananas before a ban in 1993, has been found to have contaminated farming ground, rivers and fish, and affected the health of islanders. Fishing and agriculture has had to stop in affected areas, having a significant effect on the economy. The bulk of meat, vegetable and grain requirements must be imported. This contributes to a chronic trade deficit that requires large annual transfers of aid from mainland France.

All goods entering Martinique are charged a variable "sea toll" which may reach 30% of the value of the cargo and provides 40% of the island's total revenue. Additionally the government charges an "annual due" of 1–2.5% and a value added tax of 2.2–8.5%.

=== Exports and imports ===
Exports of goods and services in 2015 amounted to €1,102 million (€504 million of goods), of which more than 20% were refined petroleum products (SARA refinery located in the town of Le Lamentin), €95.9 million of agricultural, forestry, fish and aquaculture products, €62.4 million of agri-food industry products and €54.8 million of other goods.

Imports of goods and services in 2015 were €3,038 million (of which €2,709 million were goods), of which approximately 40% were crude and refined petroleum products, €462.6 million were agricultural and agri-food products, and €442.8 million were mechanical, electrical, electronic and computer equipment.

=== Tourism ===
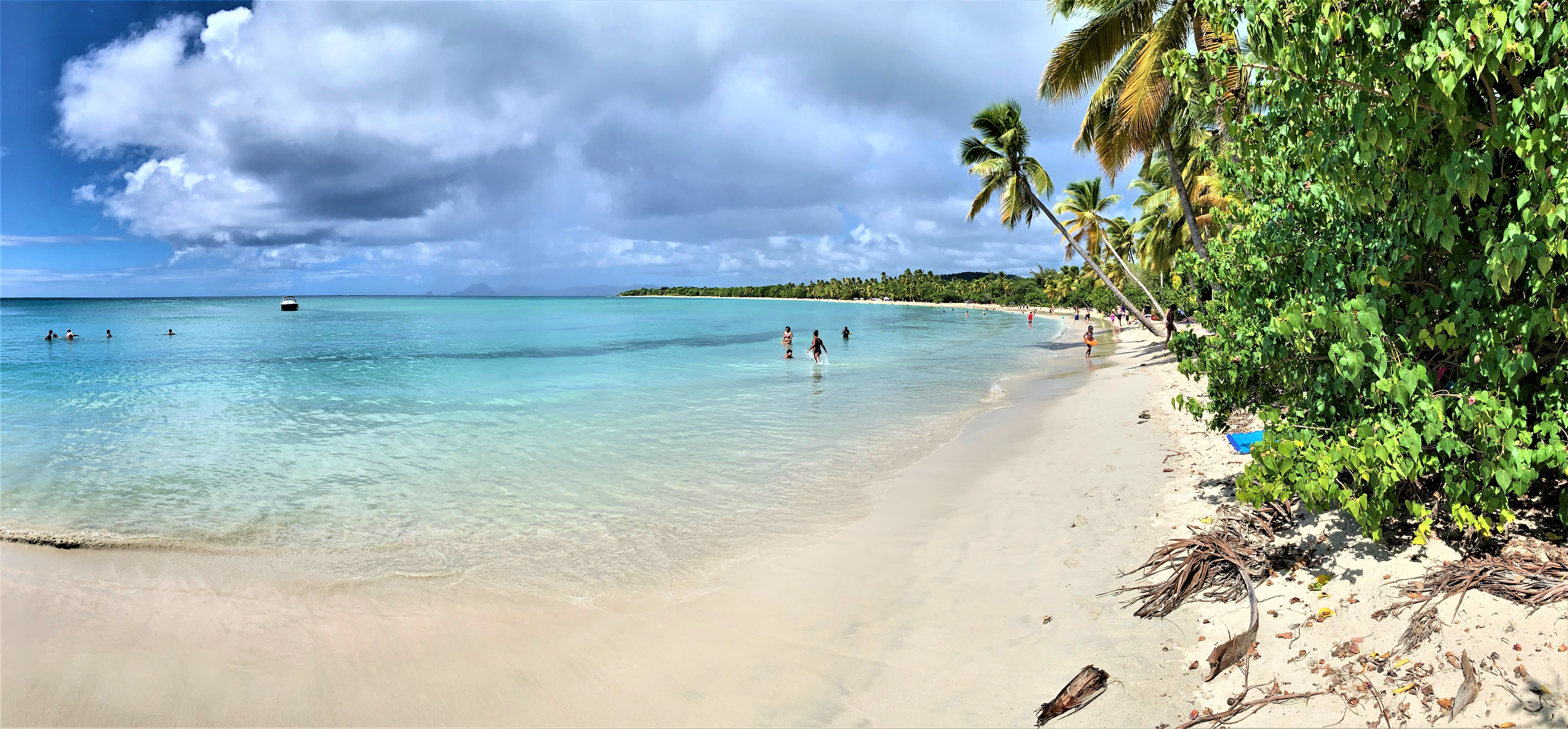
Les Salines, a wide sand beach at the southeastern end of the island

Tourism has become more important than agricultural exports as a source of foreign exchange. Most visitors come from mainland France, Canada and the United States. Roughly 16% of the total businesses on the island (some 6,000 companies) provide tourist-related services.

=== Agriculture ===
==== Banana ====
Banana cultivation is the main agricultural activity, with more than 7,200 hectares cultivated, nearly 220,000 tons produced and almost 12,000 jobs (direct + indirect) in 2006 figures. Its weight in the island's economy is low (1.6%); however, it generates more than 40% of the agricultural value added.

==== Rum ====
Rum, and particularly agricultural rum, accounted for 23% of agri-food value added in 2005 and employed 380 people on the island (including traditional rum). The island's production is about 90,000 hl of pure alcohol in 2009, of which 79,116 hl of pure alcohol is agricultural rum (2009).

==== Sugarcane ====
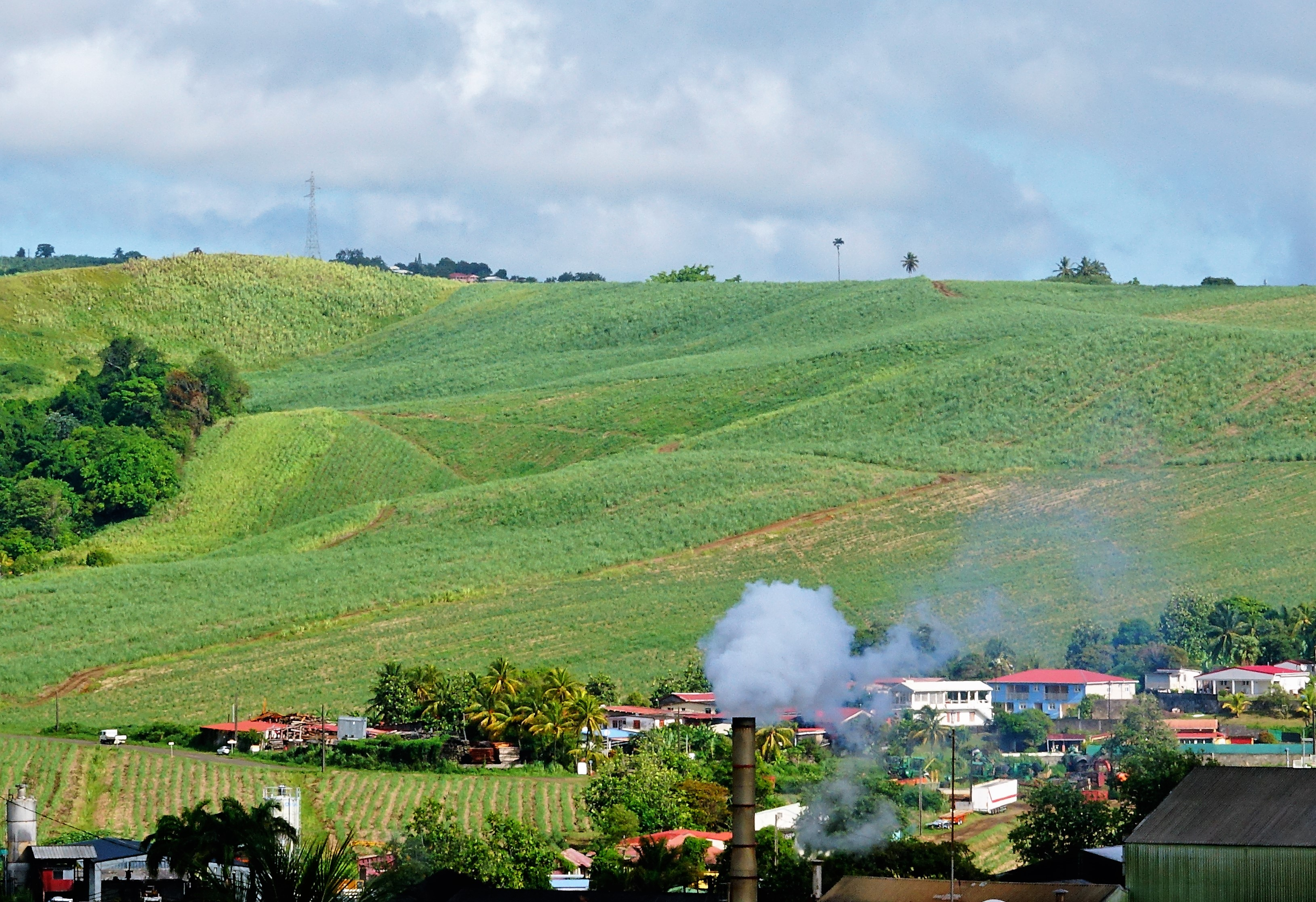
Sugarcane cultivation

In 2009, sugarcane cultivation occupied 4,150 hectares (10,300 acres), or 13.7% of agricultural land. The area under cultivation has increased by more than 20% in the last 20 years, a rapid increase explained by the high added value of the rum produced and the rise in world sugar prices. This production is increasingly concentrated, with farms of more than 50 hectares accounting for 6.2% of the farms and 73.4% of the area under production. Annual production was about 220,000 tons in 2009, of which almost 90,000 tons went to sugar production, and the rest was delivered to agricultural rum distilleries.

==== Pineapples ====
Pineapples used to be an important part of agricultural production. However, according to IEDOM, in 2005, they accounted for only 1% of agricultural production in value (€2.5 million compared to €7.9 million in 2000).

== Infrastructure ==
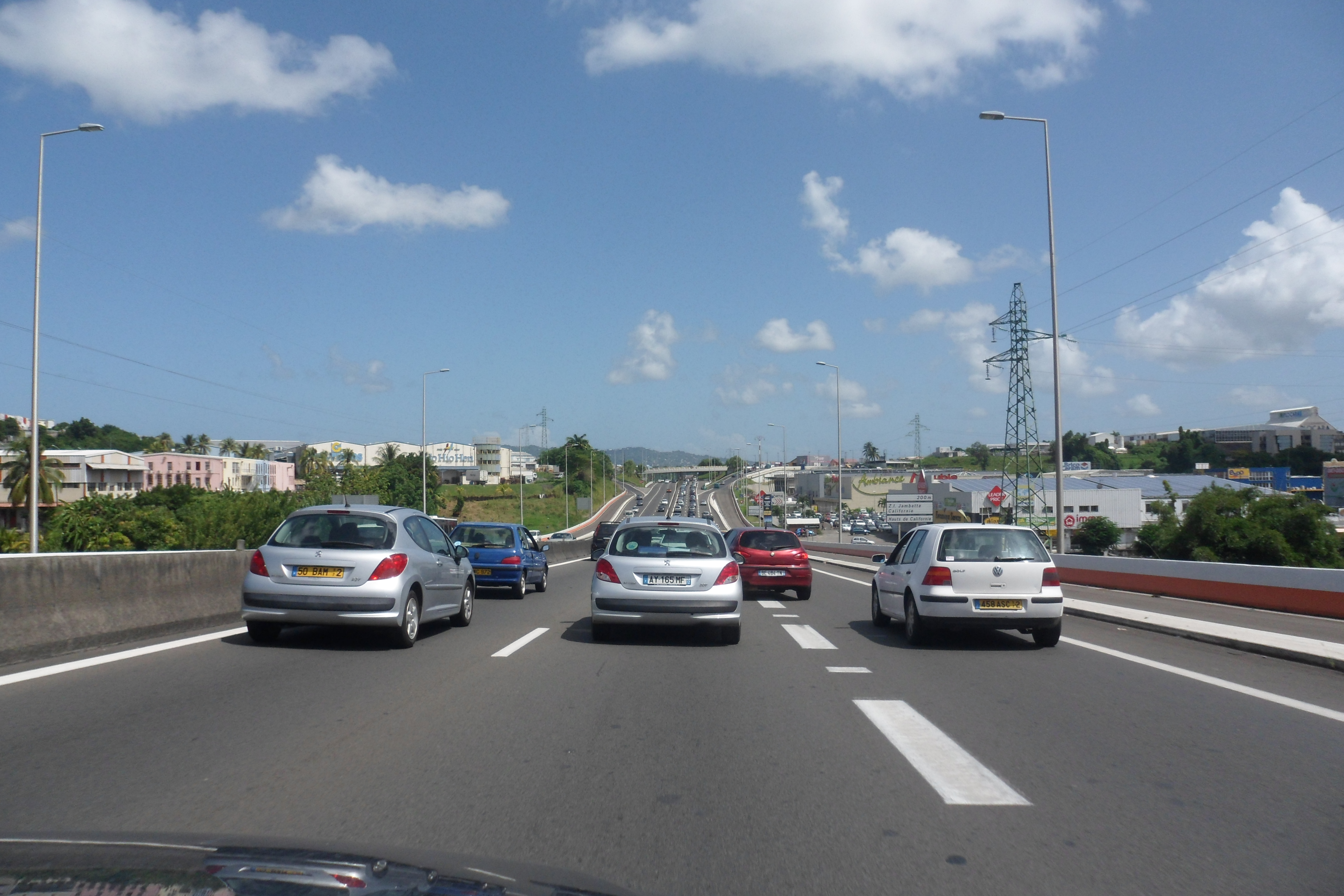
The A1 highway (972) in Fort-de-France

=== Transport ===
Martinique's main and only airport with commercial flights is Martinique Aimé Césaire International Airport. It serves flights to and from Europe, the Caribbean, Venezuela, the United States, and Canada. See List of airports in Martinique.

Fort-de-France is the major harbour. The island has regular ferry service to Guadeloupe, Dominica and St. Lucia. There are also several local ferry companies that connect Fort-de-France with Pointe du Bout.

The road network is extensive and well-maintained, with freeways in the area around Fort-de-France. Buses run frequently between the capital and St. Pierre.

==== Roads ====
In 2019, Martinique's road network consisted of 2,123 km:

- 7 km of highway (A1 between Fort-de-France and Le Lamentin);
- 919 km of departmental and national roads
- 1,197 km of communal roads.

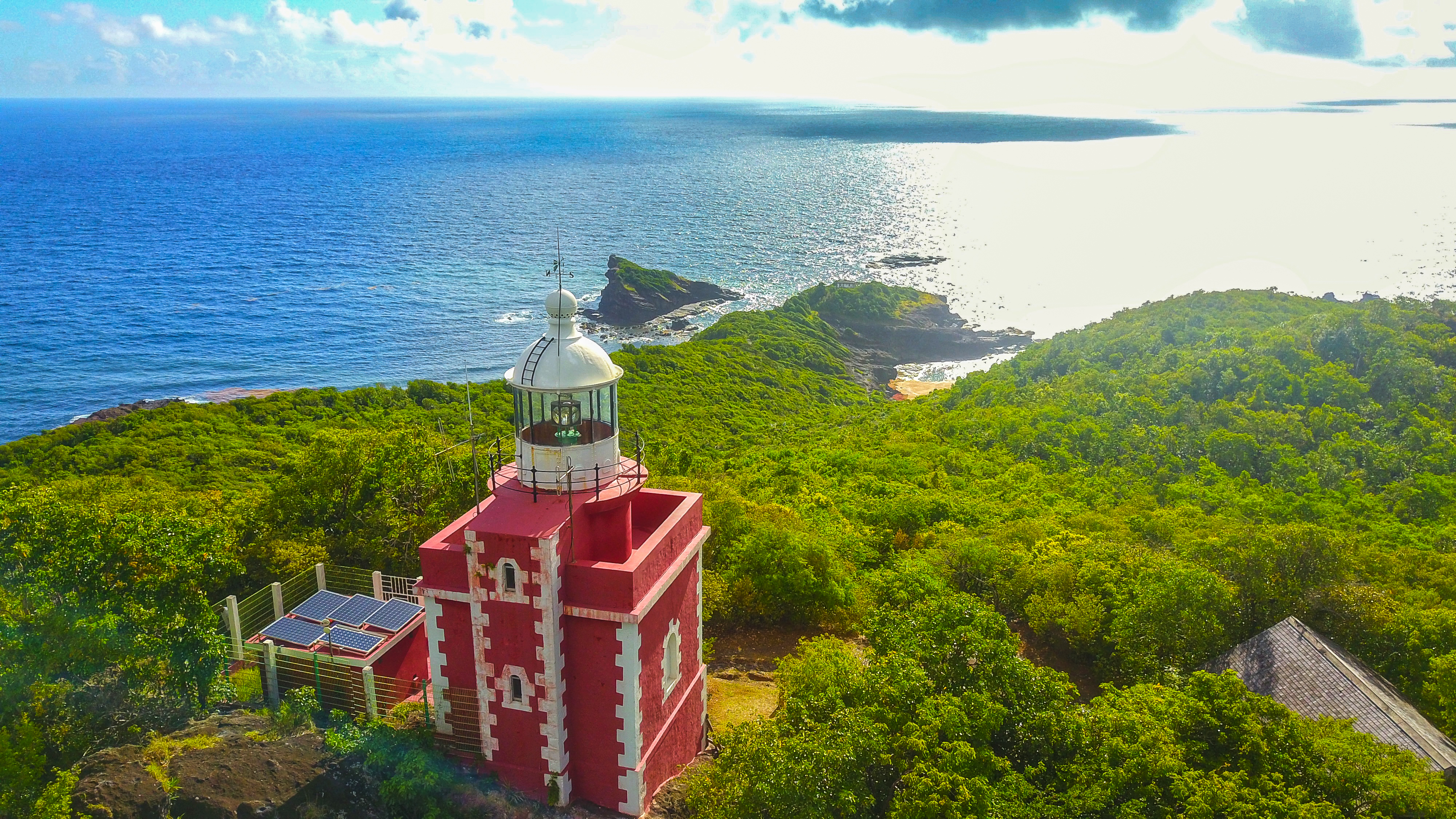
Lighthouse of La Caravelle, Martinique

In proportion to its population, Martinique is the French department with the highest number of vehicle registrations.

In 2019, 19,137 new vehicles were registered in Martinique, i.e. 42 new vehicles were purchased per 1,000 inhabitants (+14 in five years), to the great benefit of dealers.

==== Public transport ====
The public entity "Martinique Transport" was created in December 2014. This establishment is in charge of urban, intercity passenger (cabs), maritime, school and disabled student transport throughout the island, as well as the bus network.

The first exclusive right-of-way public transport line in Martinique (TCSP), served by high-service-level buses between Fort-de-France and Le Lamentin airport, was put into service on 13 August 2018. Extensions to Schœlcher, Robert and Ducos are planned.

==== Ports ====
Given the insular nature of Martinique, its supply by sea is important. The port of Fort-de-France is the seventh largest French port in terms of container traffic. After 2012, it became the Grand Port Maritime Port (GPM) of Martinique, following the State's decision to modernize port infrastructures of national interest.

==== Air services ====
The island's airport is Martinique Aimé Césaire International Airport. It is located in the municipality of Le Lamentin. Its civilian traffic (1,696,071 passengers in 2015) ranks it thirteenth among French airports, behind those of two other overseas departments (Guadeloupe – Pôle Caraïbes de Pointe-à-Pitre Airport, Guadeloupe, and La Réunion-Roland-Garros Airport). Its traffic is very strongly polarized by metropolitan France, with very limited (192,244 passengers in 2017) and declining international traffic.

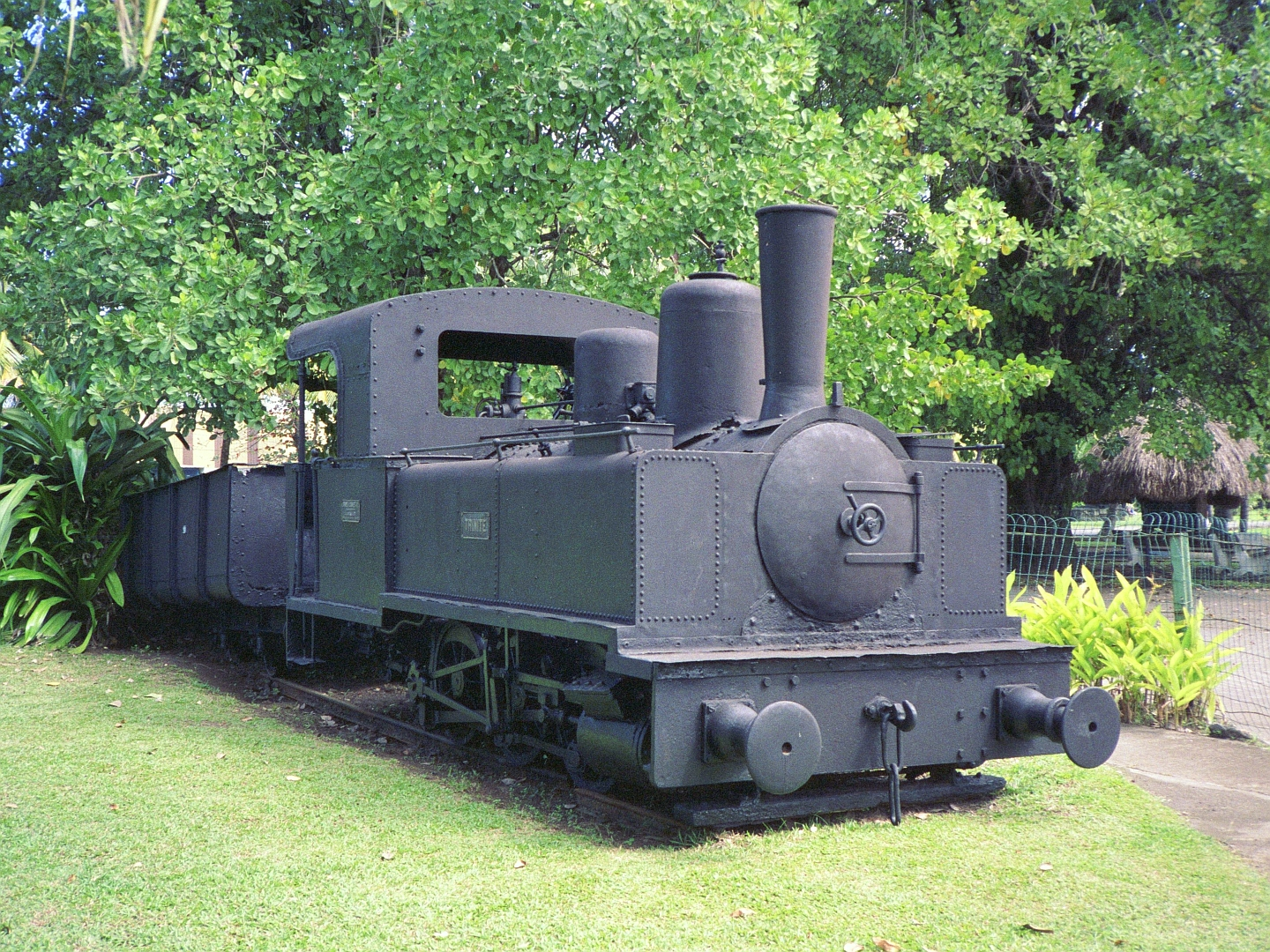
Former Martinique Plantation train (030-T-Corpet)

==== Railroads ====
At the beginning of the 20th century, Martinique had more than 240 km (150 mi) of railways serving the sugar factories (cane transport). Only one tourist train remains in Sainte-Marie between the Saint-James house and the banana museum.

=== Communications ===
The country code top-level domain for Martinique is .mq, but .fr is often used instead. The country code for international dialling is 596. The entire island uses a single area code (also 596) for landline phones and 696 for cell phones. (596 is dialled twice when calling a Martinique landline from another country.)

==== Mobile telephony ====
There are three mobile telephone networks in Martinique: Orange, SFR Caraïbe and Digicel. The arrival of Free, in partnership with Digicel, was planned for 2020.45

According to Arcep, by mid-2018, Martinique is 99% covered by 4G.

==== Television ====
The DTT package includes 10 free channels: 4 national channels of the France Télévisions group, the news channel France 24, Arte and 4 local channels Martinique 1re, ViàATV, KMT Télévision. Zouk TV stopped broadcasting in April 2021 and will be subsequently replaced by Zitata TV, whose broadcasting is delayed following the COVID-19 pandemic.

Viewers in Martinique do not have free access to other free national channels in the DTT package in mainland France (TF1 group, M6 group, etc.).

Viewers in the French overseas territories also do not have free access to the public service cultural channel Culturebox, which is not broadcast locally on DTT.

The French-language satellite package Canal+ Caraïbes is available in the territory.

==== Telephone and Internet ====
In early 2019, Orange put into service "Kanawa", a new submarine cable linking Martinique to French Guiana.

Martinique is also connected by other submarine cables: ECFS (en), Americas-2 (en) and Southern Caribbean Fiber.

== Demographics ==
=== Population ===
Martinique had a population of 349,925 as of January 2024. The population has been decreasing by 0.9% per year since 2013. There are an estimated 260,000 people of Martinican origin living in mainland France, most of them in the Paris region.

Religion in Martinique
1. Catholic (86.0%)
2. Protestant (5.60%)
3. Muslim (0.50%)
4. Baháʼí (0.50%)
5. Hindu (0.30%)
6. Others (7.10%)

Historical population
1700 estimate	1738 estimate	1848 estimate	1869 estimate	1873 estimate	1878 estimate	1883 estimate	1888 estimate	1893 estimate	1900 estimate	1954 census
24,000	74,000	120,400	152,925	157,805	162,861	167,119	175,863	189,599	203,781	239,130
1961 census	1967 census	1974 census	1982 census	1990 census	1999 census	2010 census	2015 census	2021 census	2024 estimate	
292,062	320,030	324,832	328,566	359,572	381,325	394,173	380,877	360,749	349,925	
Official figures from past censuses and INSEE estimates

=== Ethnic groups ===
The population of Martinique is mainly of African descent generally mixed with European, Amerindian (Kalinago), Indian (descendants of 19th-century Tamil and Telugu immigrants from South India), Lebanese, Syrian or Chinese. Martinique also has a small Syro-Lebanese community, a small Indian community, a small but increasing Chinese community, and the Béké community, descendants of the first European settlers.

The Béké population represents around 1% of Martinique's population, mostly of noble ancestry or members of the old bourgeoisie. In addition to the island population, the island hosts a mainland French community, most of which live on the island on a temporary basis (generally from 3 to 5 years).

=== Religion ===
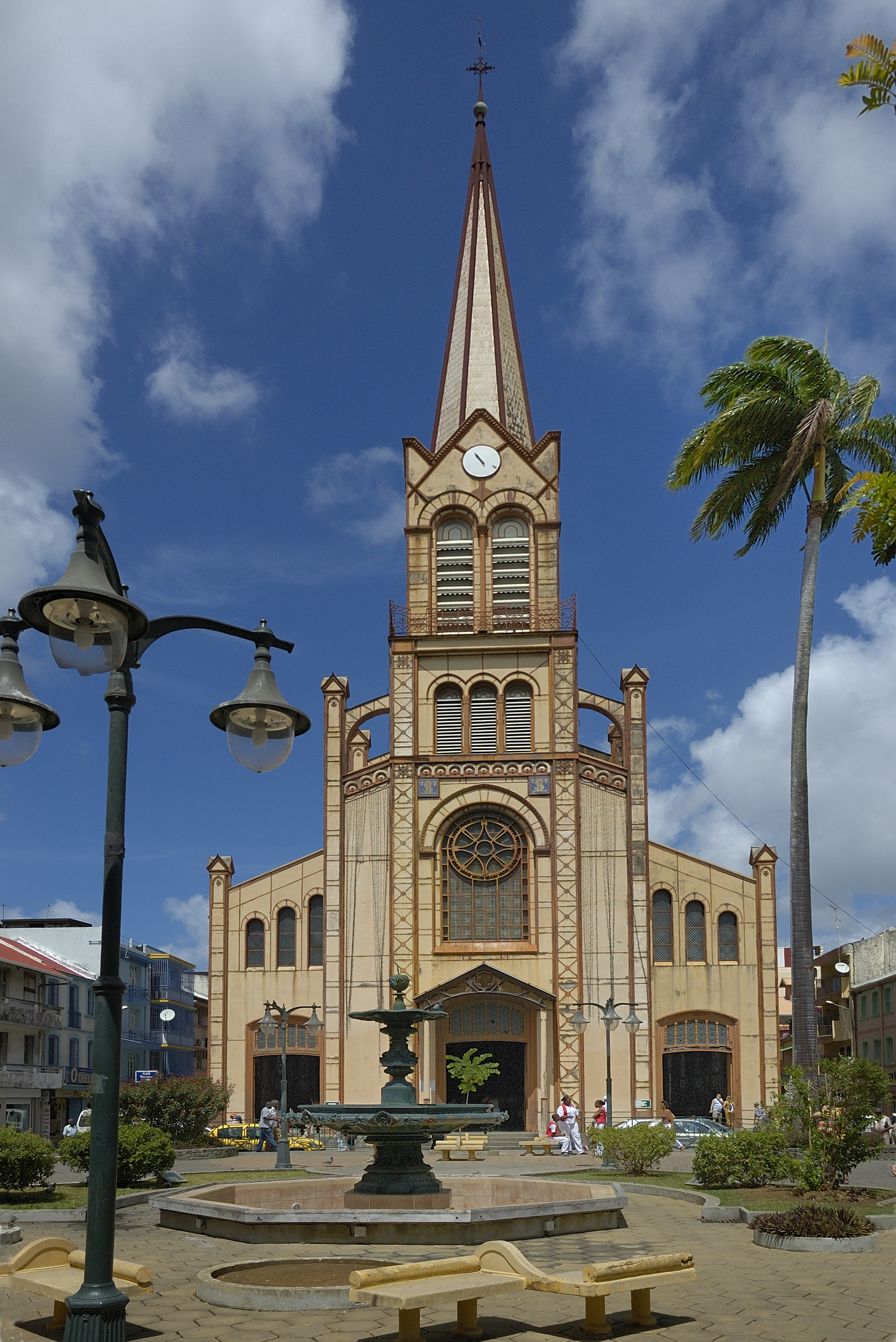
Cathédrale Saint Louis

About 90% of Martiniquans are Christian, predominantly Catholic as well as smaller numbers of various Protestant denominations. There are much smaller communities of other faiths such as Islam, Hinduism and the Baháʼí Faith.

The island has 49 parishes and several historic places of worship, such as the Saint-Louis Cathedral of Fort de France, the Sacred Heart Church of Balata, and the Co-Cathedral of Our Lady of Assumption, Saint-Pierre.

==== Catholic Church ====
Catholic parishes are present in each municipality and village of the territory. The island has the following places of worship classified as historic monuments:

- Saint-Louis Cathedral (Cathédrale Saint Louis) in Fort-de-France, erected in 1850 by a bull of Pope Pius IX, is currently the seat of the archdiocese of Saint-Pierre and Fort-de-France since 1967.
- Church of the Sacré-coeur (Sacred Heart) in Balata
- Cathedral of Notre-Dame-de-l'Assomption (Cathedral of Our Lady of the Assumption) in Saint-Pierre de la Martinique. The former church of Mouillage, located on the corner of Victor Hugo Street and Dupuy Street, in the Mouillage district of Saint-Pierre, was completed in 1956.
- Our Lady of the Assumption Church, in Sainte-Marie, a town in Martinique, dates to 1658.

The Archdiocese of Saint-Pierre and Fort-de-France (Latin: archidioecesis Sancti Petri et Arcis Gallicae seu Martinicensis) is an ecclesiastical circumscription of the Catholic Church in the Caribbean, based in Saint-Pierre and Fort-de-France, on the island of Martinique. The archdiocese of Saint-Pierre and Fort-de-France is metropolitan and its suffragan dioceses are Basse-Terre and Pointe-à-Pitre and Cayenne.

=== Languages ===
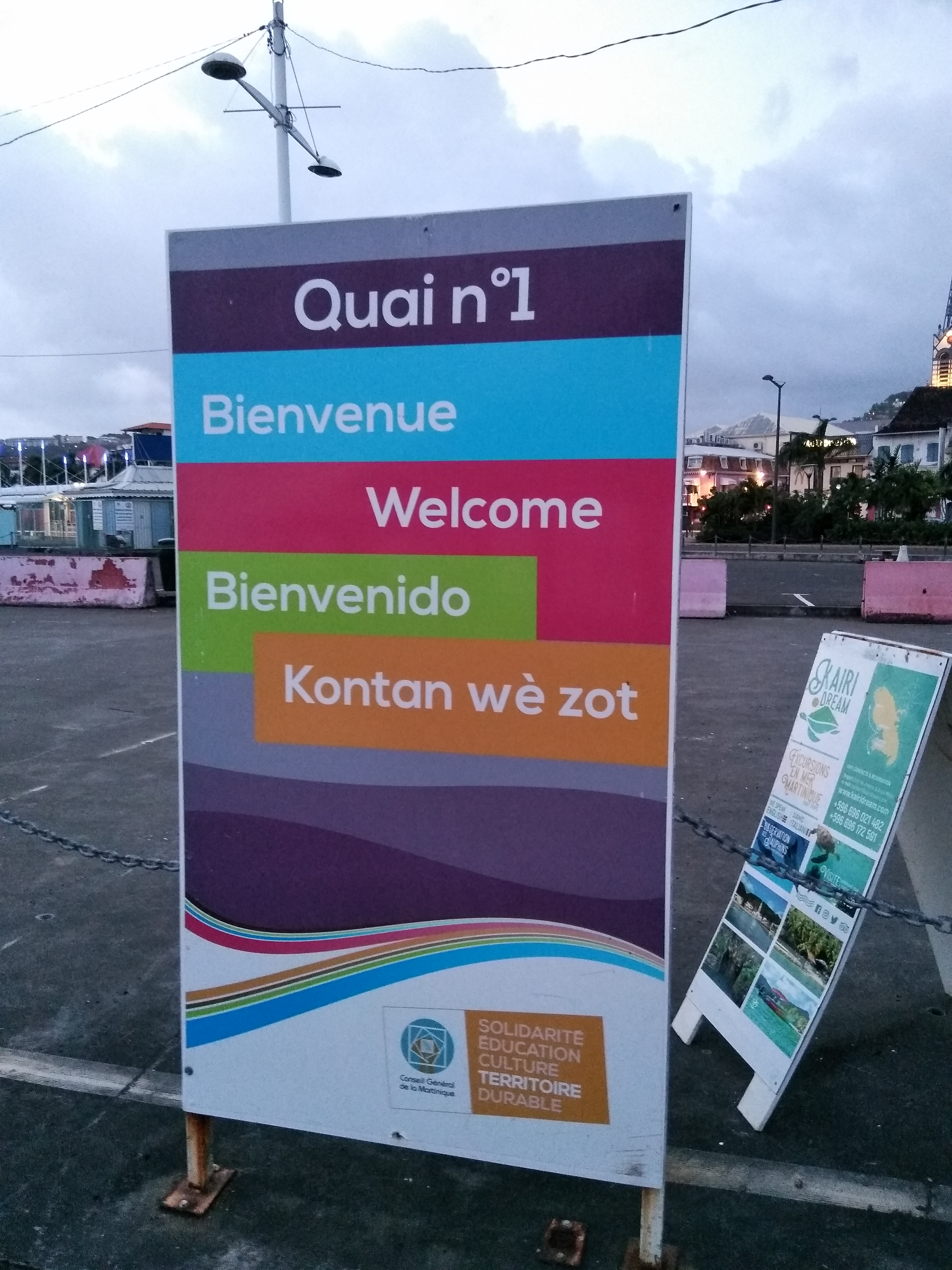
Multilingual welcome sign in Fort-de-France. Kontan wè zot is Martiniquan Creole for "Happy to see you."

The official language of Martinique is French, which is spoken by most of the population. The department was integrated into France in 1946, and consequently became French. Most residents also speak Martinican Creole (Martinique Creole, Kréyol Mat'nik, Kreyòl), a form of Antillean Creole closely related to the varieties spoken in neighboring English-dominated islands of Saint Lucia and Dominica. Martinican Creole is based on French, Carib and African languages with elements of English, Spanish, and Portuguese. Also, unlike other varieties of French creole, such as Mauritian Creole, Martinican Creole is not readily understood by speakers of Standard French due to significant differences in grammar, syntax, vocabulary and pronunciation. It continues to be used in oral storytelling traditions and other forms of speech and to a lesser extent in writing.

French and Creole are in a diglossic situation in Martinique, where French is used in official dialogue and Martinican Creole is used in casual or familial contexts. Creole was a spoken language with a developed "oraliture"; it was not until the mid-20th century that it began to be written. Since then, decreolization of the language has taken place via the adoption of Standard French features, mostly unconsciously, but some speakers have noticed that they do not speak Creole like their parents once did.

Being an overseas department of France, the island has European, French, Spanish, Caribbean, Martinican, Black (African), Indian (Tamil) and Creole markers of identity, all being influenced by foreign factors, social factors, cultural factors and, as a reportedly important marker, linguistic practices. Martinican and Creole identities are specifically asserted through encouragement of Creole language and its use in literature, in a movement known as Créolité, that was started by Patrick Chamoiseau, Jean Bernabé and Raphaël Confiant. Martinican Creole used to be a shameful language, and it was not until the 1970s that it has been revalorized through literature and increasing code switching. People now speak Martinican Creole more often and in more contexts.

Speaking Creole in public schools was forbidden until 1982, which is thought to have discouraged parents from using Creole in the home. In collaboration with GEREC (Groupe d'Etudes et de Recherches en Espace Créolophone) Raphaël Confiant created KAPES KREYOL (CAPES for Creole, Certificat d'aptitude au professorat de l'enseignement du second degré), which is an aptitude exam that allowed Creole teachers in secondary school. This debuted 9 February 2001. Recently, the education authority, Académie de la Martinique, launched "Parcours Creole +" in 2019, a project trialling bilingual education of children in French and Martinican. Rather than being a topic to be learned itself, Creole became a language that classes were taught in, such as arts, math, physical activity, etc. Parents can also choose the "Parcours Anglais +", learning in classes conducted in French and English from kindergarten until their final year, as in the Creole + course. A "Parcours Espagnol +", where children learn in and with French and Spanish, is in the planning stages.

Though Creole is normally not used in professional situations, members of the media and politicians have begun to use it more frequently as a way to redeem national identity and prevent cultural assimilation by mainland France.

==== Linguistic features of Martinican Creole ====
Martinican Creole has general locative marking (GLM, also called general locative adposition, goal/source (in)difference and motion-to=motion-from). This means that source locations, final locations and static entity locations are expressed morphologically identically. Some West African languages that are possibly contributors to Martinican Creole also present GLM. Martinican Creole locative marking exists in 3 morphological types, including:

1. spatial prepositions as free morphemes;
  - These include "an" (in), "adan" (inside), "douvan" (in front), "anba" (under) and "anlè" (on).
2. spatial morphemes "a-", "an(n)-", and "o(z)-" bound to the noun on their right;
  - Only bare lexemes that depict certain locations will take on these particles
3. phonologically null locative markers
  - In ambiguous sentences, these are added to polysyllabic city names

== Culture ==
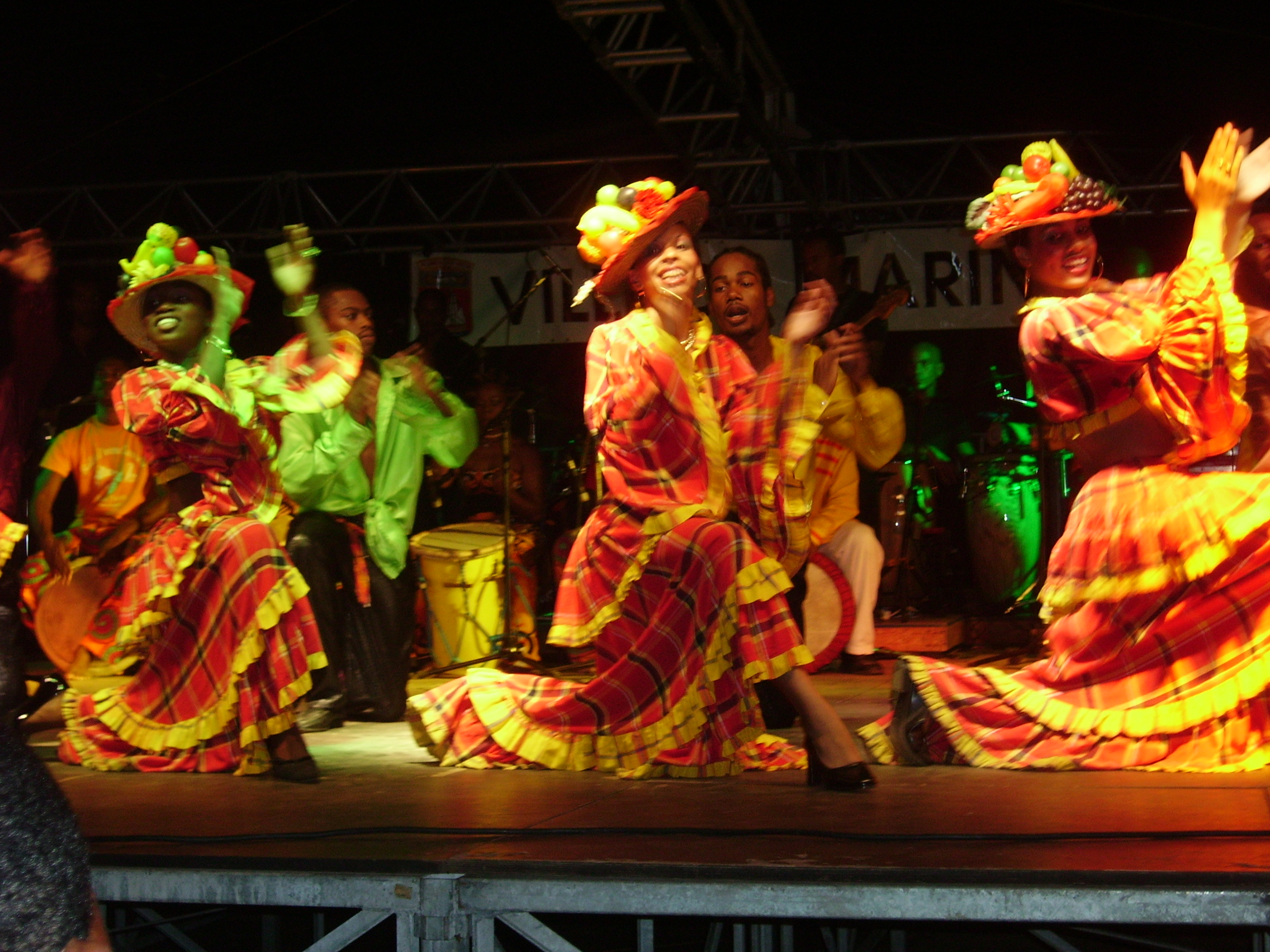
Martinique dancers in traditional dress

As an overseas département of France, Martinique's culture has blended the French, African, Indian and Caribbean influences. The city of Saint-Pierre (destroyed by a volcanic eruption of Mount Pelée), was often referred to as the "Paris of the Lesser Antilles". Following traditional French custom, many businesses close at midday to allow a lengthy lunch, then reopen later in the afternoon.

Today, Martinique has a higher standard of living than most other Caribbean countries. French products are easily available, from Chanel fashions to Limoges porcelain. Studying in the métropole (mainland France, especially Paris) is common for young adults. Martinique has been a vacation hotspot for many years, attracting both upper-class French and more budget-conscious travelers.

=== Cuisine ===
Martinique has a hybrid cuisine, mixing elements of African, French, Carib Amerindian and Indian subcontinental traditions. One of its most famous dishes is the Colombo (compare kuzhambu (Tamil: குழம்பு) for gravy or broth), a unique curry of chicken (curry chicken), meat or fish with vegetables, spiced with a distinctive masala of Tamil origins, sparked with tamarind, and often containing wine, coconut milk, cassava and rum. A strong tradition of Martiniquan desserts includes cakes made with pineapple, rum, and a wide range of local ingredients.

=== Literature ===
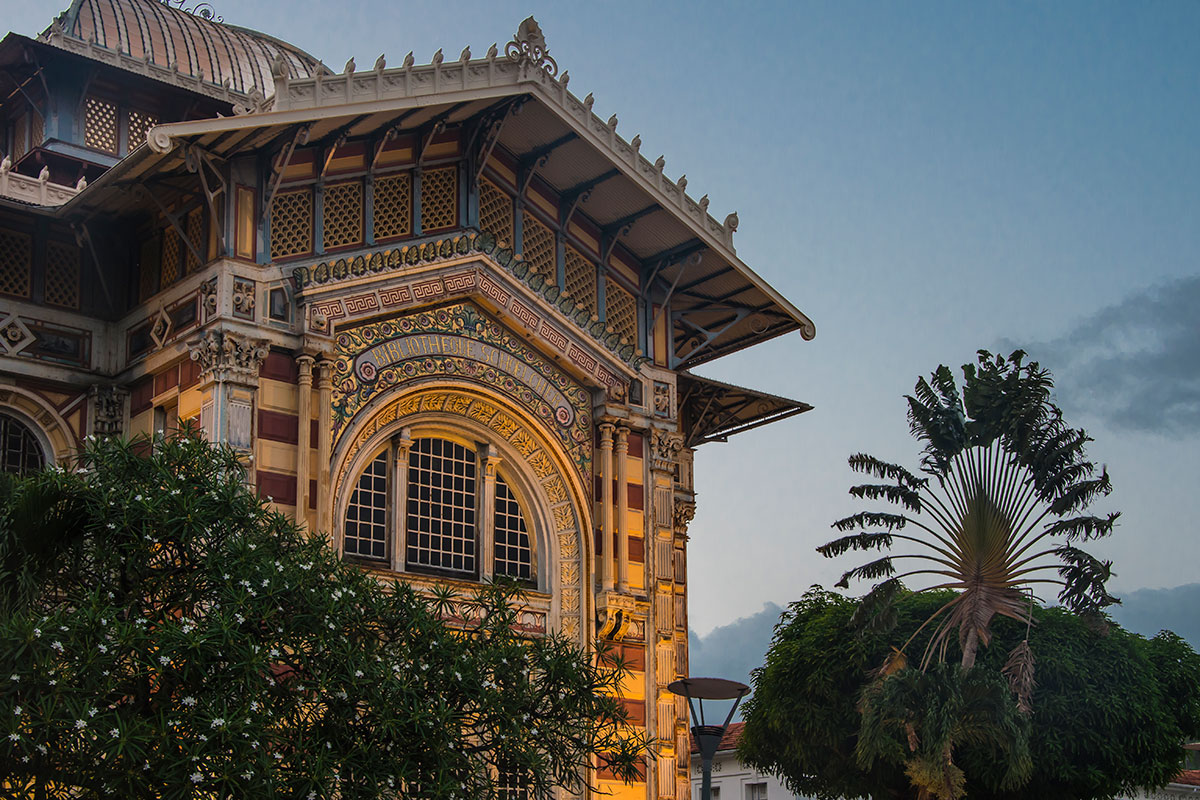
Schoelcher Library

Sisters Jeanne Nardal and Paulette Nardal were involved in the creation of the Négritude movement. Yva Léro was a writer and painter who co-founded the Women's Union of Martinique. Anna Marie-Magdeleine wrote with her partner under the pseudonym Carbet.

Aimé Césaire is perhaps Martinique's most famous writer; he was one of the main figures in the Négritude literary movement. René Ménil was a surrealist writer who founded the journal Tropiques with Aimé and Suzanne Césaire and later formulated the concept of Antillanité. Other surrealist writers of that era included Étienne Léro and Jules Monnerot, who co-founded the journal Légitime Défense with Simone Yoyotte and Ménil. Édouard Glissant was later influenced by Césaire and Ménil, and in turn had an influence on Patrick Chamoiseau, who founded the Créolité movement with Raphaël Confiant and Jean Bernabé. Raphaël Confiant was a poetry, prose and non-fiction writer who supports Creole and tries to bring both French and Martinican Creole together in his work. He is specifically known for his contribution to the Créolité movement.

Frantz Fanon, a prominent critic of colonialism and racism, was also from Martinique.

=== Music ===
Martinique has a large popular music industry, which gained in international renown after the success of zouk music in the later 20th century. Zouk's popularity was particularly intense in France, where the genre became an important symbol of identity for Martinique and Guadeloupe. Zouk's origins are in the folk music of Martinique and Guadeloupe, especially Martinican chouval bwa, and Guadeloupan gwo ka. There's also notable influence of the pan-Caribbean calypso tradition and Haitian kompa.

=== Film ===
Martinique has been the site for filming many films, including movies, TV shows, and documentaries. The Martinique Film Commission offers aid opportunities, including residence grants, writing assistance, development assistance and production assistance.

=== Symbols and flags ===
Martinique adopted a new flag on February 2, 2023, featuring a red triangle at the hoist and two horizontal bands of green and black. The flag of France is also flown alongside it as the country's parent country. A previous competition to create a flag in 2018 was annulled by the local administrative tribunal, but the island began a new public vote in 2022, with the hummingbird design being selected as the winner. However, the designer withdrew her design due to accusations of plagiarism, and the runner-up design, the rouge-vert-noir ("red-green-black"), was adopted. This flag is also the preferred symbol of Martinique's independence movement.

The Ipséité is a civil flag, designed for use in international cultural and sporting events to represent the territory.

Flag sometimes used by Martinique in taekwondo competitions

A St Michael cross with white snakes. Also called the 'snake flag' of Martinique. Its use is sometimes controversial.

Also called 'red, green and black', this flag is used by the independence movement.

Flag of Martinique adopted on February 2, 2023
Coat of arms based on the controversial 'snake flag'. Its use by the National Gendarmerie was ended in 2018.

== Sport ==
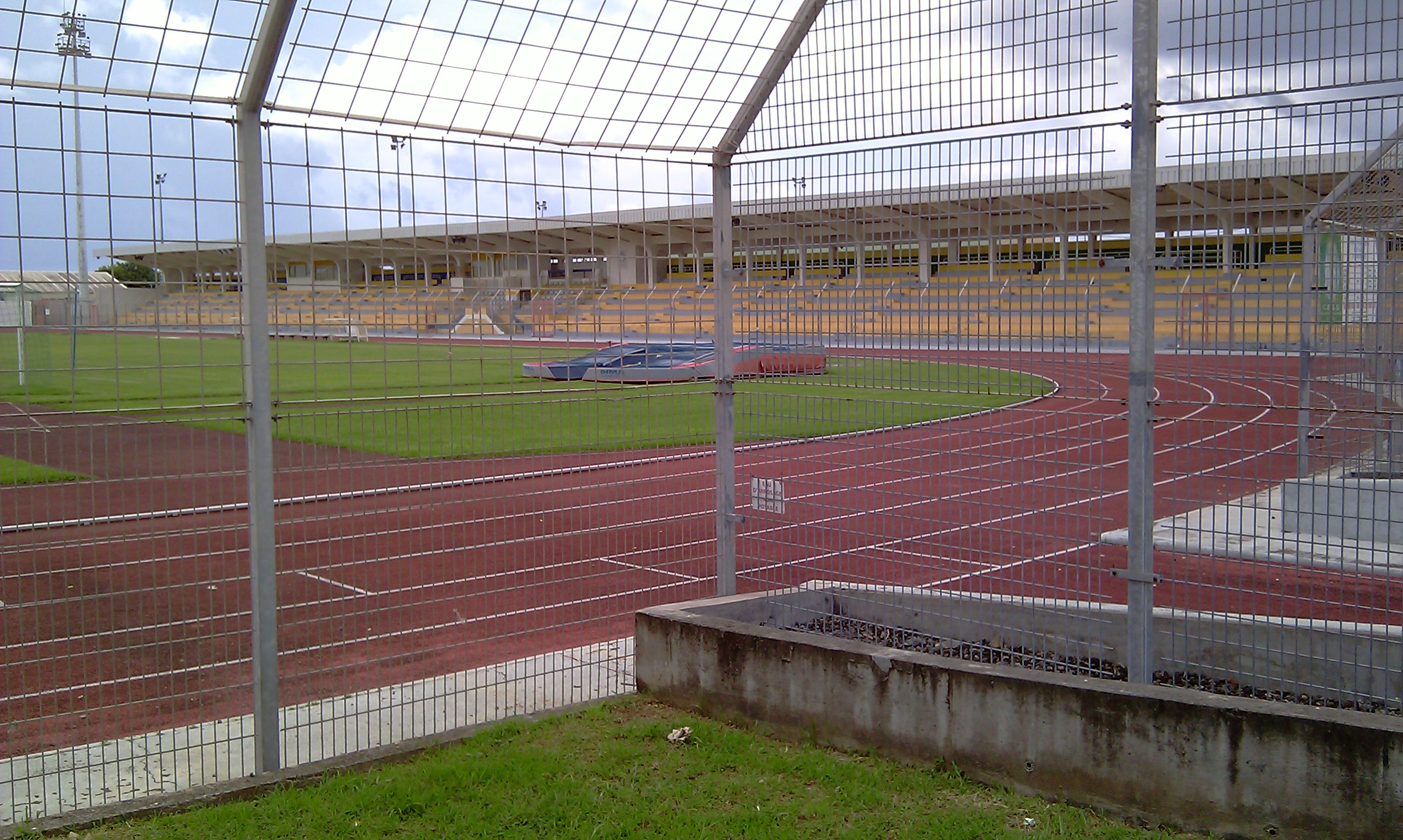
Louis Achille Stadium

=== Association football ===
The Martinique national football team is affiliated with CONCACAF, but not FIFA, so it does not play in World Cup Qualifiers, but can play friendly matches and CONCACAF tournaments such as the CONCACAF Nations League and Gold Cup. Since Martiniquais people are French citizens, they may choose to represent France in international competitions. Several French players also have had roots in Martinique although they were born or raised in France. Among the most famous include Thierry Henry, Eric Abidal, Raphaël Varane, Sylvain Wiltord and Loïc Rémy, all of whom represented France on multiple occasions and in Henry's case won the European Golden Boot twice. Henry and Varane also have won a FIFA World Cup each.

Martinique has its own soccer league known as the Ligue de Football de Martinique. The Martinique men's soccer championship, known as the Regional 1 (R1) – Trophée Gérard Janvion, is a premier local soccer competition in the territory. It is held annually in the form of a championship between fourteen amateur clubs between the months of September and May. The competition is organized by the Martinique Football League and, although the clubs in the league are affiliated with the French Football Federation, there is no promotion to the French national championships.

At the end of the twenty-six-day (two-stage) championship, the top four teams qualify for the Ligue Antilles, while the bottom three are relegated to the lower division, the Régionale 2.

=== Surf ===
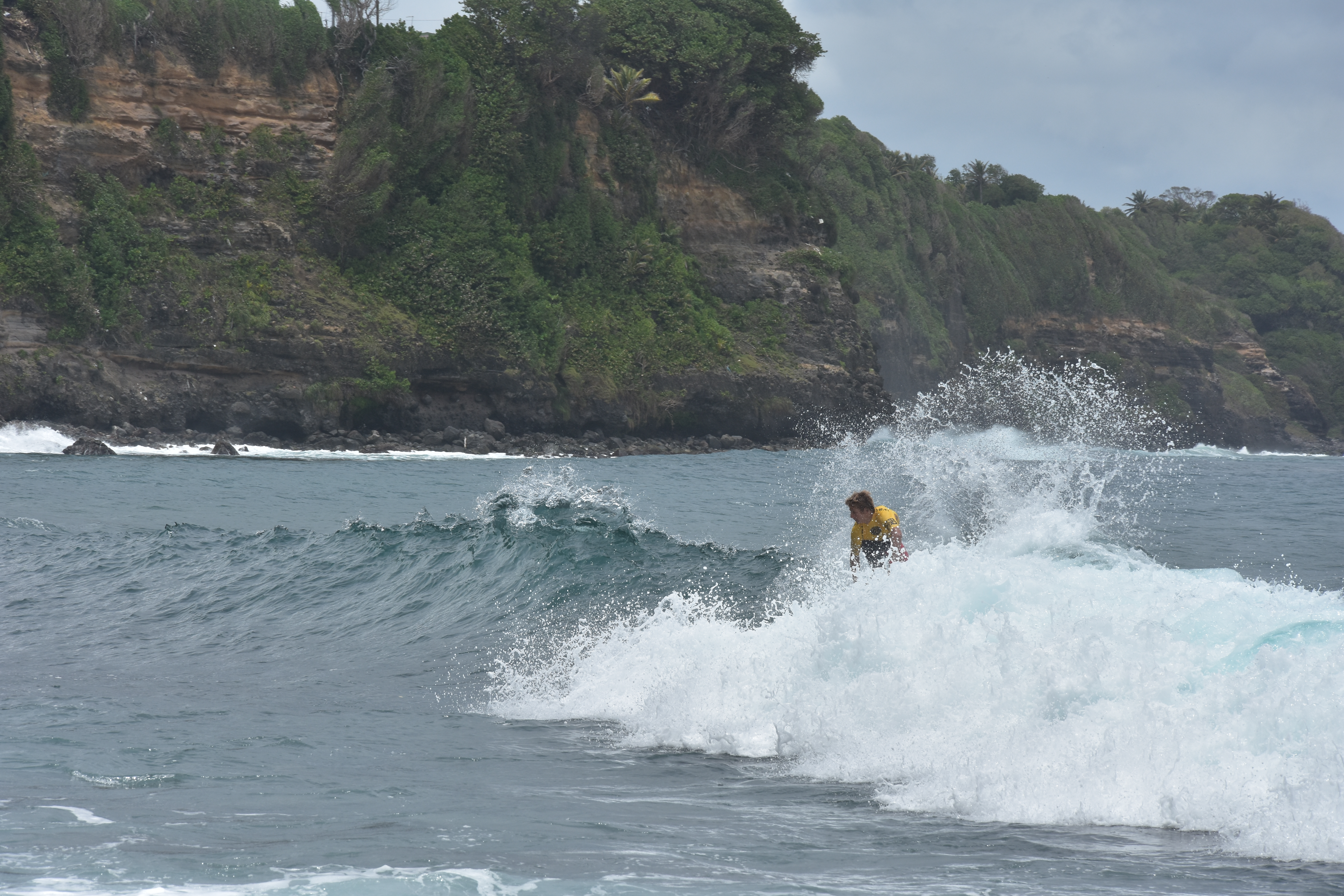
153rd International Surfing Championship, Basse-Pointe, Martinique

The Martinique Surf Pro is an international surfing competition held every year in April in Basse-Pointe (Martinique). It was created in 2015 by two Martinicans, Nicolas Ursulet and Nicolas Clémenté and is organized by the Caribbean Surf Project (CSP).51 It is the only Caribbean competition in the World Surf League, the world surfing championship. It is part of the World Qualifying Series calendar, the entry league to the WSL's elite circuit, the Championship Tour.

=== Regattas ===
Le Tour de Yoles Rondes de Martinique is an annual sailing regatta, the island's largest sporting event, which takes place in late July and early August and is very popular with spectators.

The event is organized by the Fédération des yoles rondes. Crews circumnavigate Martinique on a 180-kilometer course over eight stages. The race begins with a prologue time trial from the starting town.

The time trial determines the starting order of the first ten boats, and the time between starts is determined by the advantage of each boat over the next during the prologue; all Boats below the top ten start simultaneously. The next seven legs circumnavigate the island. The leg around the southern part of the island, starting in the commune of Le Diamant, passing through Sainte-Anne and finishing in Le François, is known as the Défi de l'Espace Sud (Southern Challenge Zone).

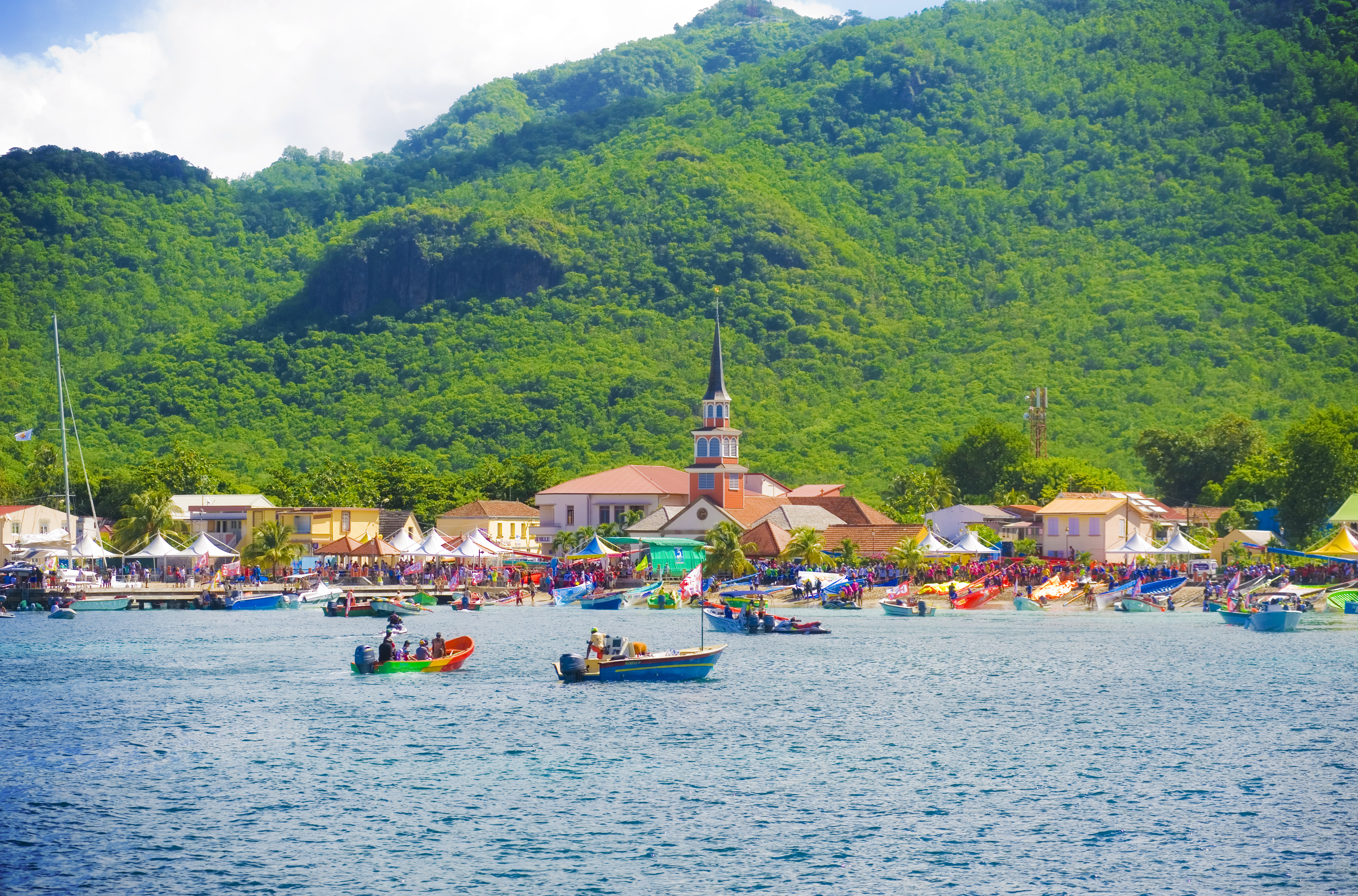
Tour des Yoles

=== Handball ===
The Martinique Handball Championship, organized by the Martinique Handball League, concludes with the Poule des As (play-off) which determines the Martinique champion in the women's and men's categories. The Poule des As is a very popular event in Martinique, the pavilions are filled for the finals held at the Palais des Sports de Lamentin.

The highest division is the Pré-Nationale, equivalent to the Pré-Nationale (or even the Nationale 3) in metropolitan France. The champions of the Poule des As come every year to Metropolitan France to play in the finals of the French Handball Championships of N1, N2 and N3 Women, N2 and N3 Men Metropolitan/Ultra Marines.

The winners (female and male) of the Martinique Handball Cup, receive a reward of 10 000 Euros. The main players of the Martinique Handball Championship in recent years have been: Katty Piejos, Cédric Sorhaindo, Joël Abati.

== People ==
List of people born in Martinique with at least one parent or grandparent born there, or who are living or have lived in Martinique:

=== Painters and sculptors ===
- Victor Anicet
- Jean-François Boclé
- Hector Charpentier
- Henri Guédon
- René Louise
- Joseph René-Corail, also known as Khokho

=== Film-makers, screenwriters, directors and actors ===
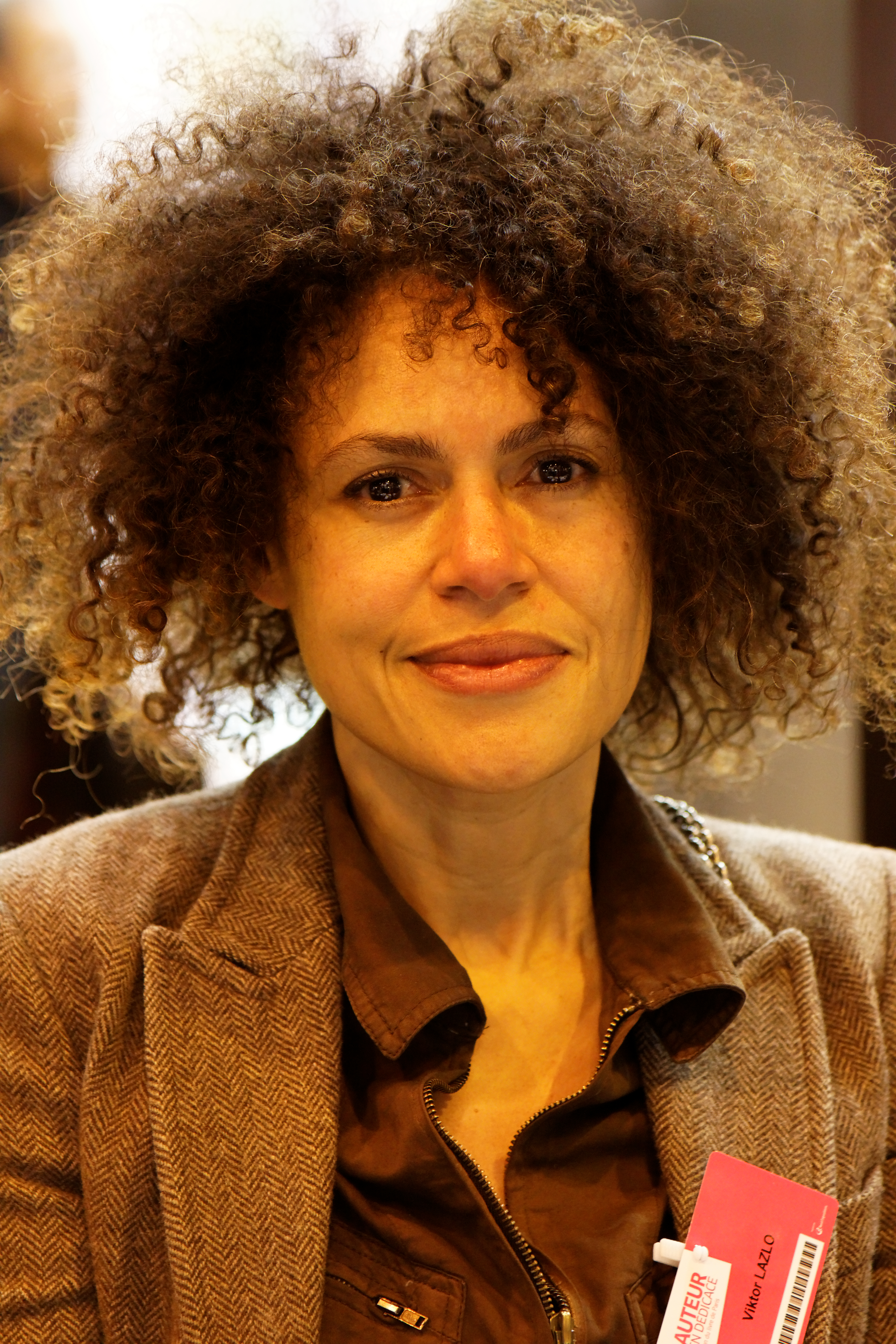
Viktor Lazlo (Paris Book Fair 2011)

- Lucien Jean-Baptiste - actor, writer and director
- Stéfi Celma - actress and singer.
- Alex Descas - film actor
- Viktor Lazlo - singer.
- Darling Légitimus - former actress.
- Chris Macari - video director and producer
- Euzhan Palcy - film director, screenwriter, and producer.
- Sabine Quindou - journalist and TV presenter
- Cathy Rosier - model and actress

=== Singers, musicians or music groups ===
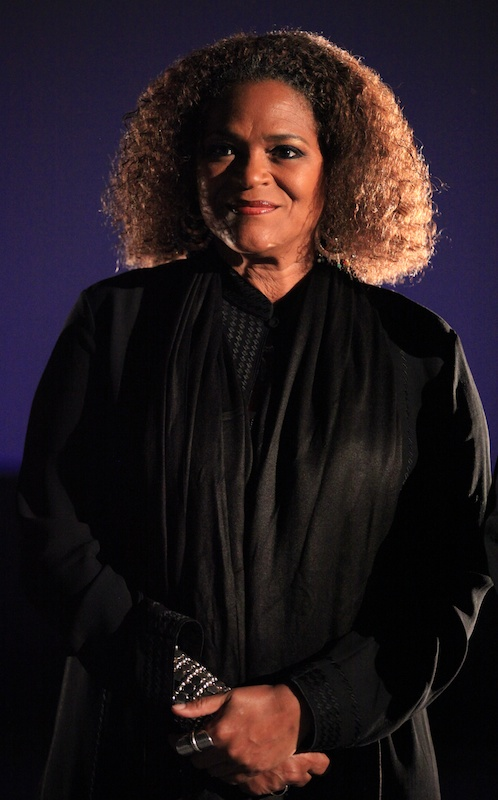
Jocelyne Béroard at the Mons International Film Festival (May 2007). She was made Officier des l'ordre des Arts et des Lettres in 2020 and National Order of the Legion of Honor in 2014.

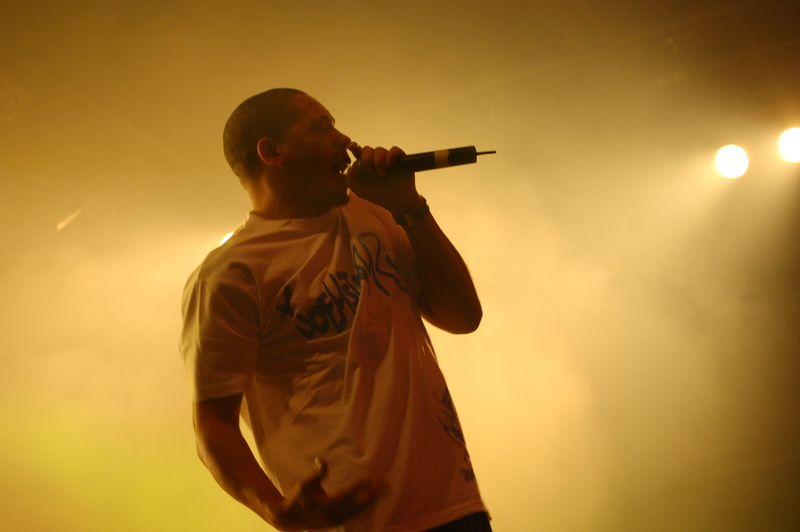
Joeystarr at Art Rock 2007, Saint-Brieuc (February 2011)

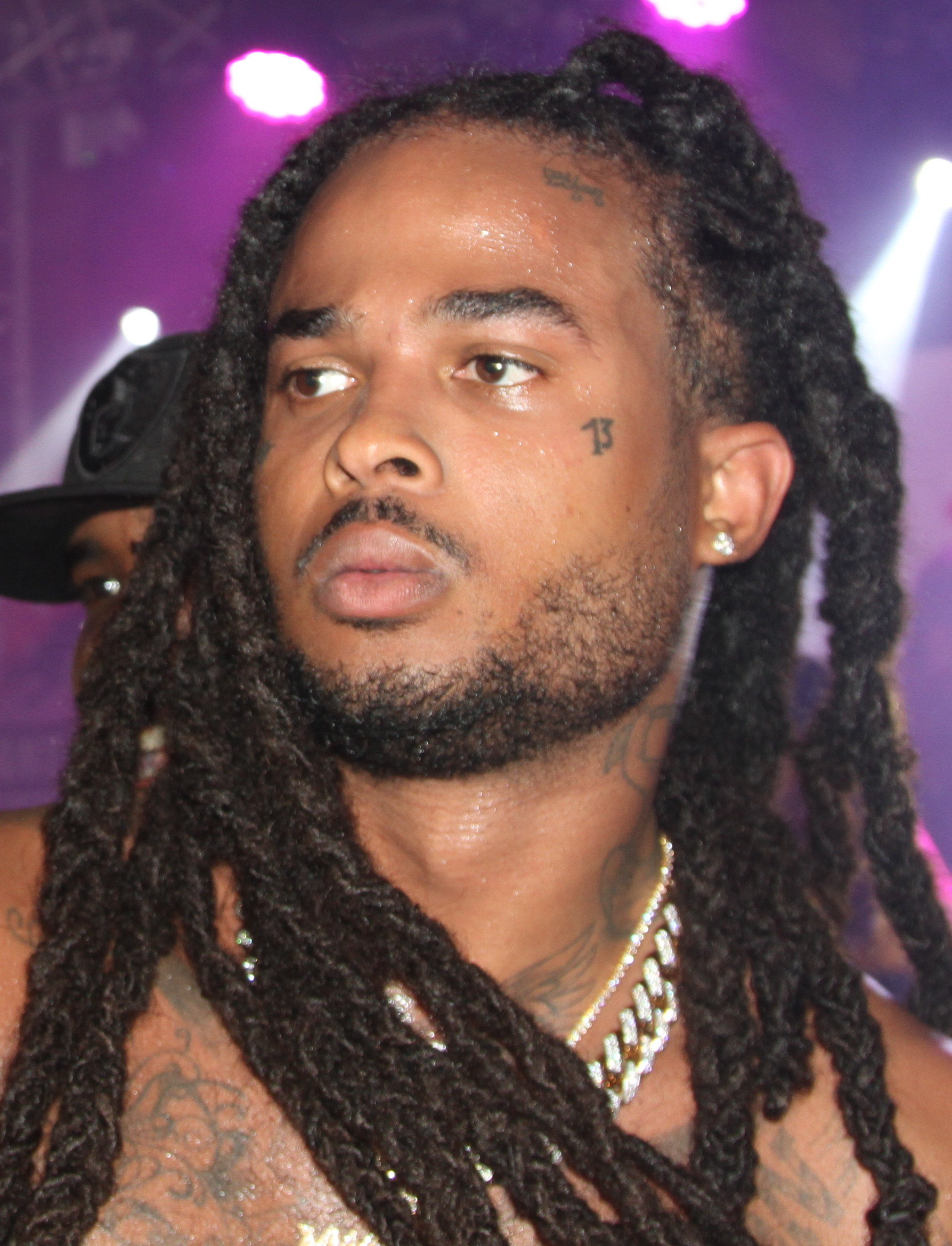
Kalash, rapper and singer of Dancehall and Trap

- Paulo Albin : author, composer and performer, lead singer in La Perfecta
- Jenny Alpha : actress and singer
- Jocelyne Béroard : author and part of the group Kassav' and first woman to receive a double gold record, for the sales of her album Siwo in the Antilles. She was made Officer of l'ordre des Arts et des Lettres in 2020 and National Order of the Legion of Honor in 2014.
- Mino Cinelu : musician
- Cyril Cinélu : winner of Star Académy 2006
- Miss Dominique : singer
- Gibson Brothers : a disco/salsa band from Sainte-Marie
- Christina Goh : singer and songwriter of blues-chanson réaliste music
- JoeyStarr : rapper, producer and actor
- Simon Jurad : author, composer, performer (former guitarist of La Perfecta)
- Lord Kossity : rapper and dancehall singer. In 1998, he recorded the hit Ma Benz with Kool Shen and JoeyStarr on Suprême NTM's album, which made him a household name in France.
- Philippe Lavil : singer, author, composer and performer
- Kalash : rapper
- Tiitof : rapper and trap music artist.
- Viktor Lazlo : actress and singer
- Princess Lover : zouk singer
- Malavoi : band mixing French Antillean music with modern influences from across the Americas
- Edmond Mondésir : author, composer and singer of Bèlè music
- La Perfecta : a band which played music including cadence and compas most active in the 1970s and 80s.
- Ronald Rubinel : author, composer, performer and producer of zouk.
- Dédé Saint Prix : singer and traditional musician playing chouval bwa
- Shy'm : French R'n'B singer and dancer
- Axel Tony : singer
- Lynnsha : singer, author, composer and performer of zouk
- Eddy Marc : zouk singer
- Stacy: zouk singer, nominee for Best New International Act at the BET Awards 2020.

=== Sports personalities ===
==== Athletics / Parathletics ====
- Marie-José Pérec
- Coralie Balmy
- Ghislaine Barnay
- Mélanie de Jesus dos Santos
- Mandy François-Elie
- Max Morinière
- Hermann Panzo
- Ronald Pognon

==== Basketball ====
- Marielle Amant
- Leslie Ardon
- Sandrine Gruda
- Ronny Turiaf
- Mathias Lessort

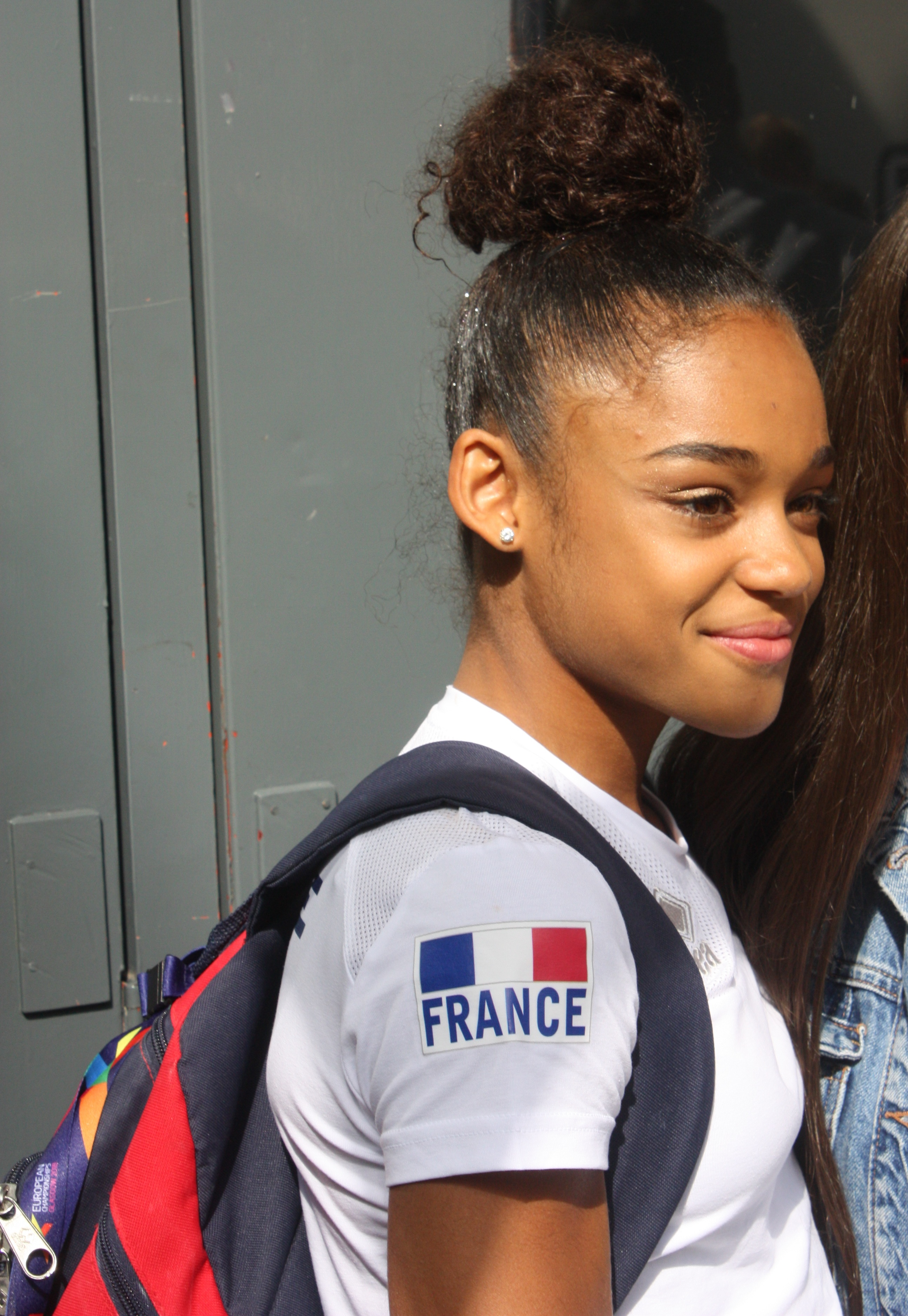
Mélanie de Jesus dos Santos is the 2019 European Artistic Gymnastics all-around champion, a two-time European champion on floor exercise (2018, 2019), and the 2021 European champion on the balance beam.

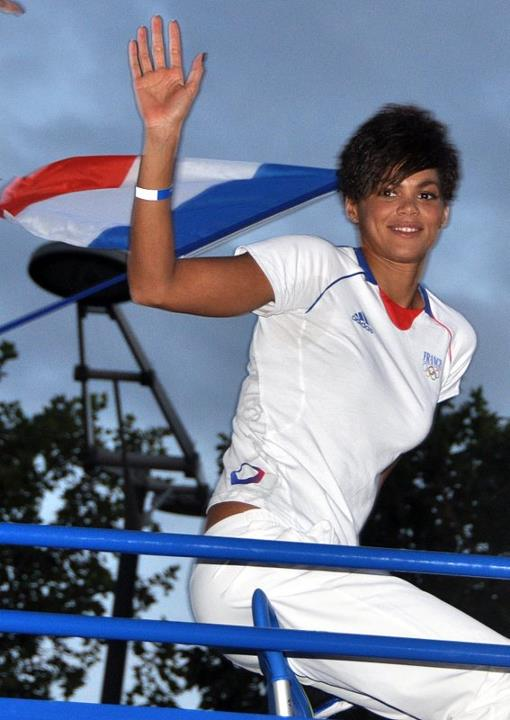
Coralie Balmy, freestyle swimmer, at the parade of French medallists of the 2012 Olympics (August 2012)

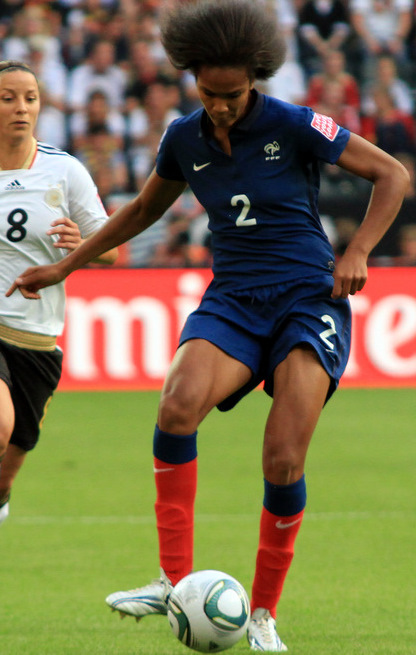
Wendie Renard at the 2011 FIFA Women's World Cup (July 2011)

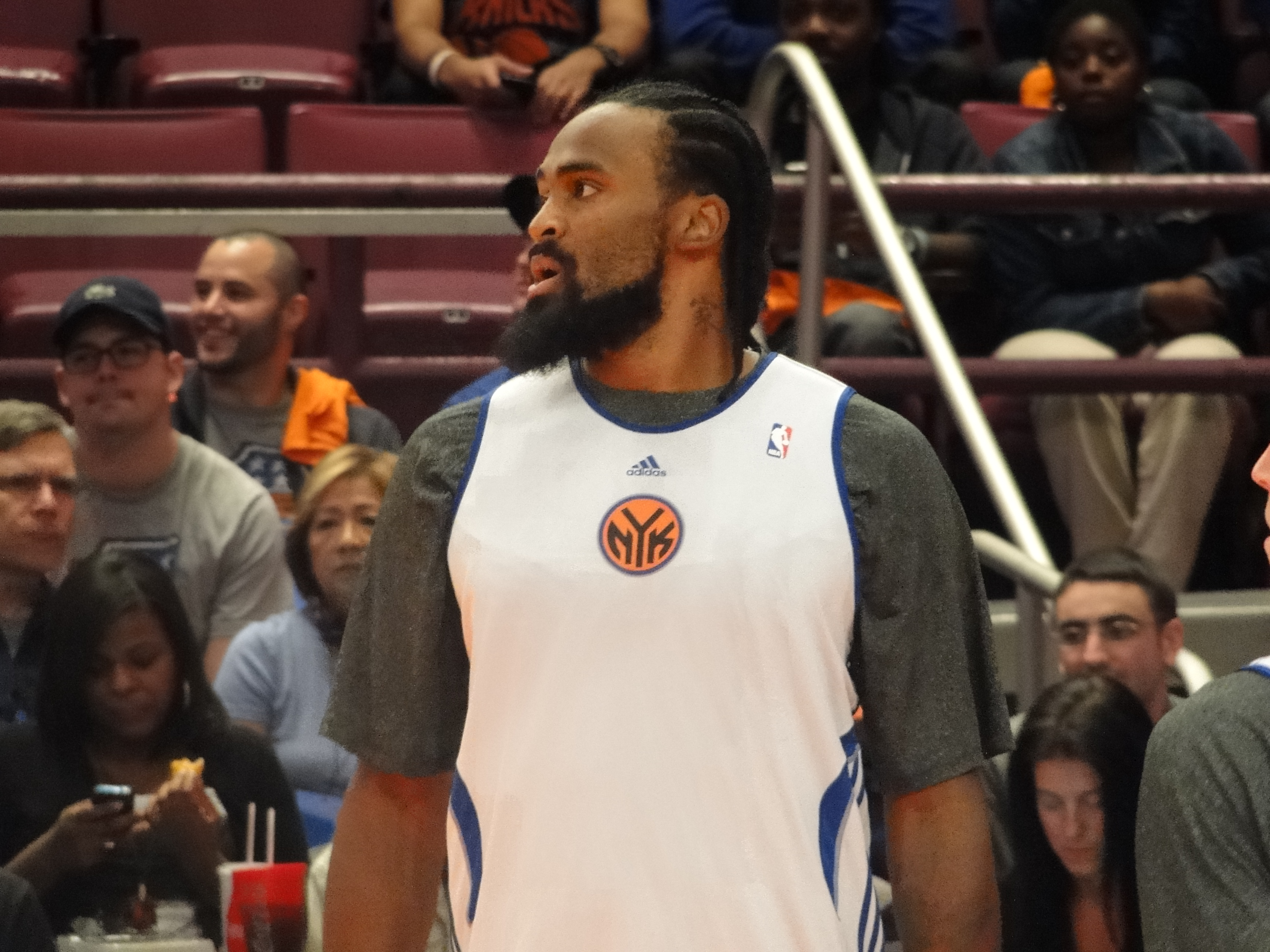
Ronny Turiaf at a New York Knicks practice (October 2010)

==== Football ====
- Stéphane Abaul
- Fabrice Abriel
- Nicolas Anelka
- Johan Audel
- Jean-Sylvain Babin
- Mickaël Biron
- Garry Bocaly
- Patrick Burner
- Manuel Cabit
- Florian Chabrolle
- Daniel Charles-Alfred
- Paul Chillan
- Jérémie Porsan-Clémenté
- Gaël Clichy
- Charles-Édouard Coridon
- Mathias Coureur
- Sébastien Crétinoir
- Jordy Delem
- Didier Domi
- Julio Donisa
- Gaël Germany
- Joan Hartock
- Thierry Henry
- Christophe Hérelle
- Daniel Hérelle
- Steeven Langil
- Peter Luccin
- Kévin Parsemain
- Patrick Percin
- Frédéric Piquionne
- David Regis
- Loïc Rémy
- Wendie Renard
- Fabrice Reuperné
- Emmanuel Rivière
- Franck Tanasi
- Kévin Théophile-Catherine
- Raphaël Varane
- Sylvain Wiltord
- Axel Witsel
- Warren Zaïre-Emery
- Jonathan Zebina

==== Handball ====
- Joël Abati
- Mathieu Grébille
- Cédric Sorhaindo

==== Judo ====
- Amandine Buchard
- Kayra Sayit

==== Tennis ====
- Gaël Monfils

==== Volleyball ====
- Frantz Granvorka
- Séverin Granvorka

=== Politics ===
==== Contemporary political figures ====
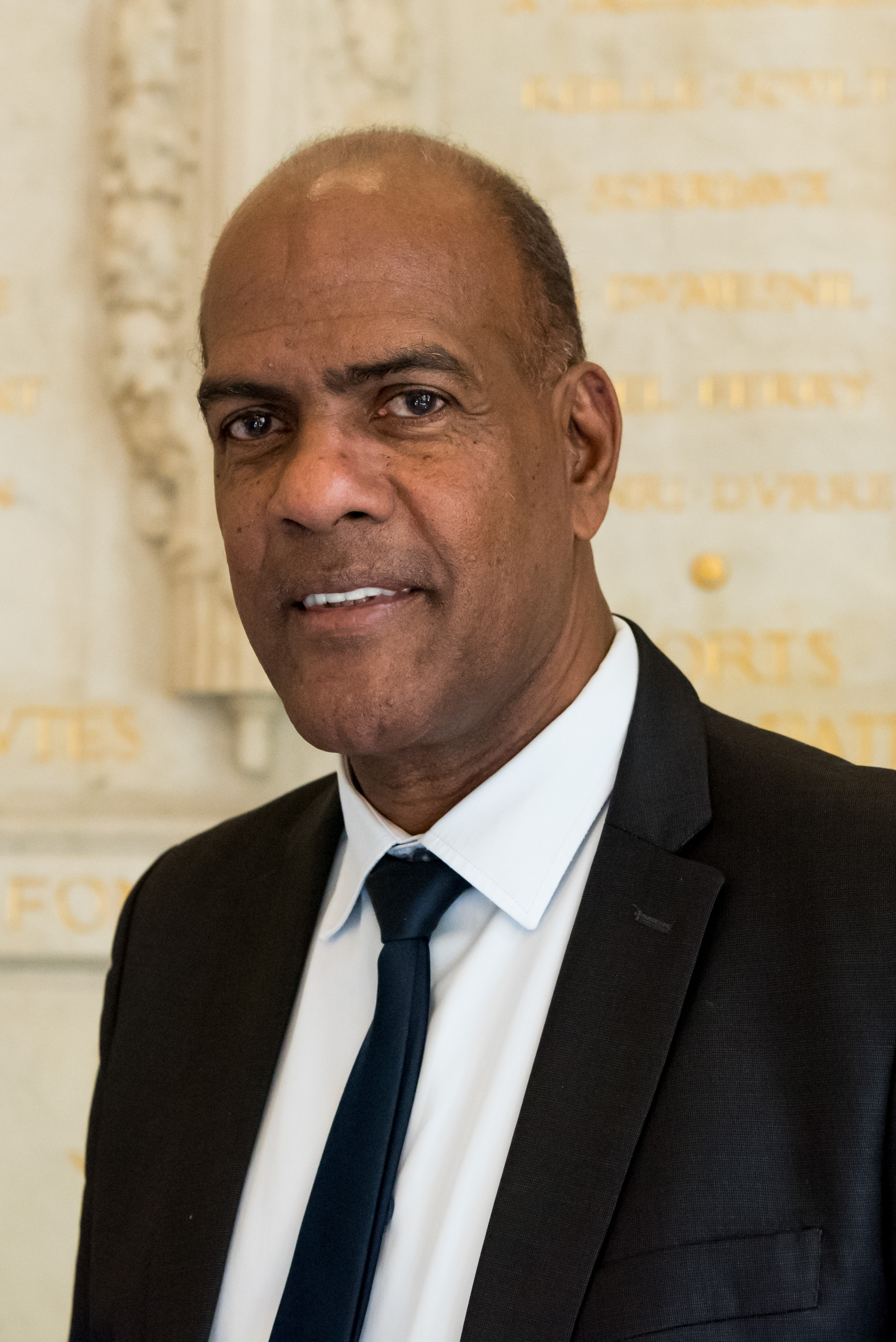
Serge Letchimy, President of the Executive Council of Martinique since 2 July 2021, President of the Regional Council of Martinique from 2010 to 2015, Mayor of Fort-de-France from 2001 to 2010 and President of the Martinican Progressive Party since 2005

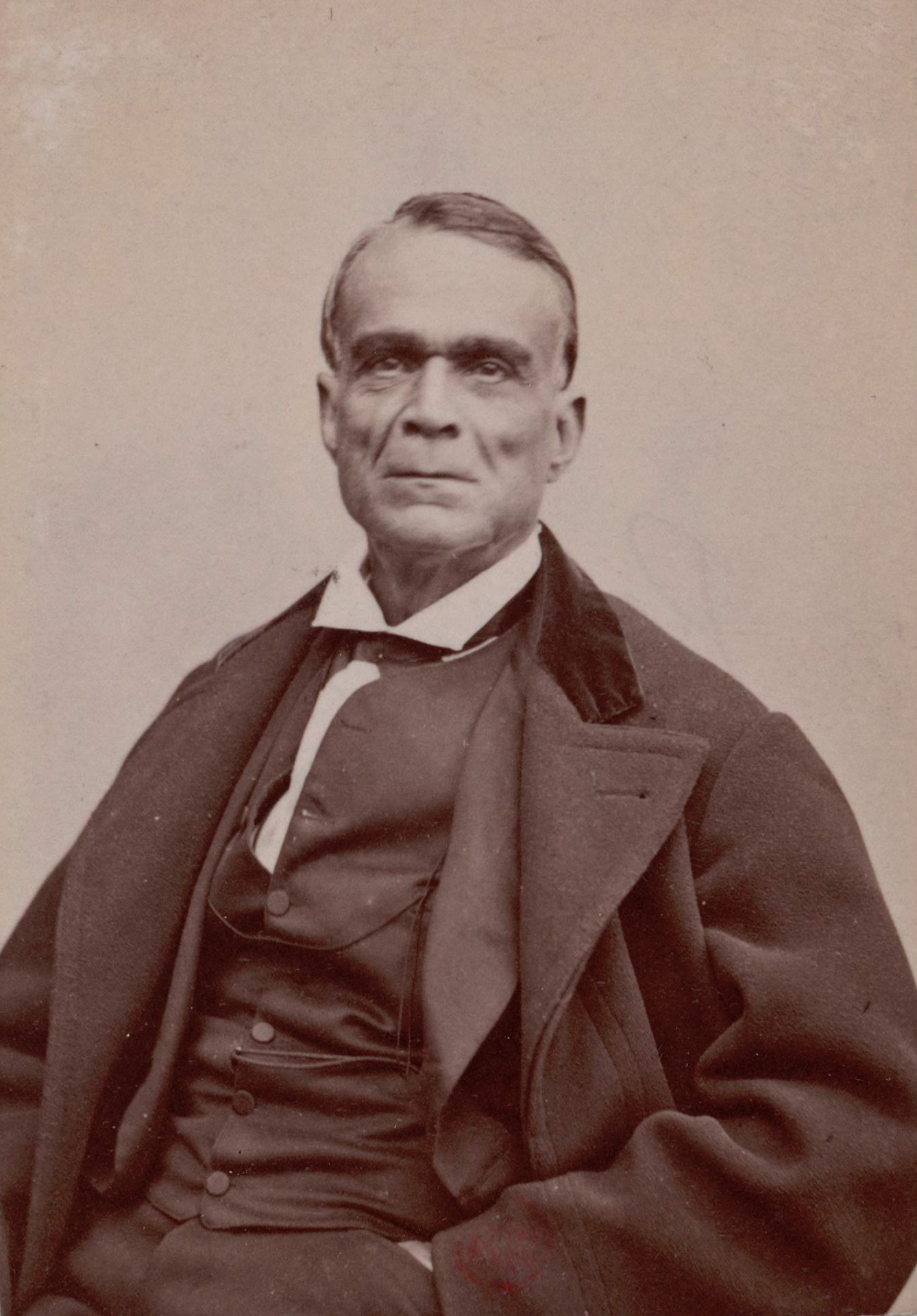
Pierre-Marie Pory-Papy, Abolitionist and anti-slavery Member of Parliament from 1848 to 1849 and 1871-1874

- Maurice Antiste, Senator and former mayor of François
- David Zobda, Mayor of Lamentin, vice-president of CACEM and member of the Executive Council of Martinique
- Didier Laguerre, Mayor of Fort-de-France, CACEM and Councillor to the Assembly of Martinique
- Yann Monplaisir, Mayor of Saint-Joseph,1st vice-president of the Territorial Authorities of Martinique
- André Lesueur, Mayor of Rivière-Salée and former Conseiller régional of Martinique
- Serge Letchimy, President of the Executive Council of Martinique since 2021, member of the National Assembly of France representing the island of Martinique's 3rd constituency since June 2007
- Josette Manin, Member of Parliament for Martinique, Councillor to the Assembly of Martinique and former President of the General Council of Martinique
- Bruno Nestor Azerot, Mayor of Sainte-Marie, President of CAP Nord Martinique and Councillor to the Assembly of Martinique
- Jean-Philippe Nilor, Deputy and Councillor to the Assembly of Martinique
- Luc-Louison Clémenté, Mayor of Schoelcher and President of the CACEM
- Justin Pamphile, Mayor of Le Lorrain, Councillor to the Assembly of Martinique, President of the Association of Mayors of Martinique
- Nicaise Monrose, Mayor of Sainte-Luce, vice-president of CAESM and member of the Executive Council of Martinique
- Arnaud René-Corail, Mayor of Les Trois-Ilets, vice-president of CAESM and member of the Executive Council of Martinique
- Marie-Thérèse Casimirius, Mayor of Basse-Pointe, First Vice-president of CAP Nord Martinique and member of the Executive Council of Martinique
- Manuéla Kéclard-Mondésir, Member of Parliament for Martinique
- Lucien Saliber, President of the Assembly of Martinique, 4th Vice President of CAP Nord Martinique, Municipal Councillor of Le Morne-Vert and former mayor of Le Morne-Vert
- Jenny Dulys-Petit, Mayor of Le Morne Rouge and Councillor to the Assembly of Martinique
- Audrey Pulvar, former journalist and politician, Deputy Mayor of Paris and Regional Councillor for Île-de-France, Member of the Standing Committee.
- Karine Jean-Pierre, political advisor, White House Press Secretary.
- Cédric Pemba-Marine was born in Hauts-de-Seine in France, of Martinican origin, and mayor of Le Port-Marly since 2020.

==== Politicians of Martinique ====
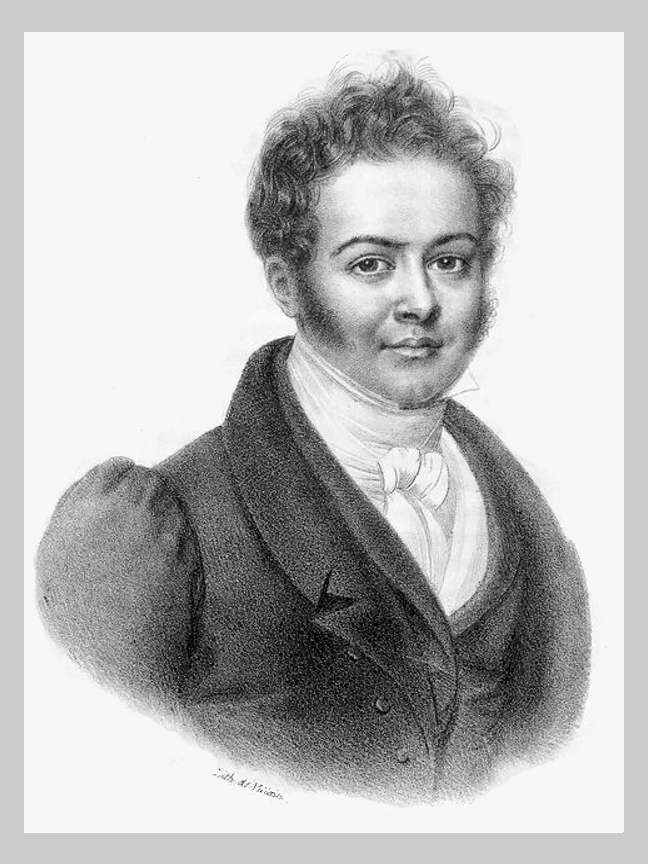
Cyrille Bissette, deputy from 1849 to 1851 and one of the fathers of the abolition of slavery in Martinique

- Pierre Aliker, doctor and mayor of Fort-de-France
- Josephine Bonaparte, born Marie Josèphe Rose Tascher de La Pagerie was Empress of the French and Queen consort of Italy
- Cyrille Bissette, deputy and one of the fathers of the abolition of slavery in Martinique
- Auguste-François Perrinon, Abolitionist Member of Parliament
- Pierre-Marie Pory-Papy, first black Martinican to become a lawyer, a mayor of Saint-Pierre and Abolitionist Member of Parliament
- Victor Mazuline, first black Martinican elected Member of Parliament
- Léopold Bissol, deputy and one of the founders of the communist movement in Martinique and the CGT Martinique union
- Aimé Césaire, Deputy Mayor of Fort-de-France and President of the Regional Council
- Camille Darsières, Member of Parliament and President of the Regional Council
- Louis Delgrès, known for the anti-Slavery proclamation signed with his name, dated 10 May 1802, and leading resistance on Guadeloupe to reoccupation and thus the reinstitution of slavery by Napoleonic France in 1802.
- Alcide Delmont, Under-Secretary of State for the Colonies of the nineteenth and nineteenth century, in the government of André Tardieu
- Ernest Deproge, Member of Parliament for Martinique (1882–1898), President of the General Council and a controversial figure of French colonization
- Osman Duquesnay, Mayor of Fort-de-France and Member of Parliament
- François Duval, Senator from 1968 to 1977, Mayor of François and President of the General Council
- Georges Gratiant, Mayor of Lamentin and President of the General Council
- Marius Hurard, deputy and founder of the secular school in Martinique
- Joseph Lagrosillière, deputy and founder of the socialist movement in Martinique
- Pierre-Alexandre Le Camus, Count of Fürstenstein (born in Martinique in 1774, died in 1824 in Le Chesnay), Secretary of State and foreign minister to Kingdom of Westphalia.
- Henry Lémery, Justice Minister in the government of Gaston Doumergue, Martinican appointed minister in a French government.
- Émile Maurice, Mayor of Saint-Joseph and President of the General Council
- Camille Petit, deputy and founder of the Gaullist movement in Martinique
- Pierre Petit, Mayor of Le Morne-Rouge and Member of Parliament
- Marie-Joseph Pernock served in the National Assembly from 1966 to 1967.
- Michel Renard, Mayor of Marigot and Deputy
- Victor Sévère, Deputy Mayor of Fort-de-France
- Paul Symphor, President of the General Council 1947–1948 and Senator
- Victor Schœlcher (died 1893), deputy of Martinique, 1848–1849 and 1871–1875, known for having acted in favor of the definitive abolition of slavery in France, via the decree of abolition of 1848
- Emmanuel Véry-Hermence 1902–1966, member of the National Assembly

=== Martinican writers and intellectuals ===
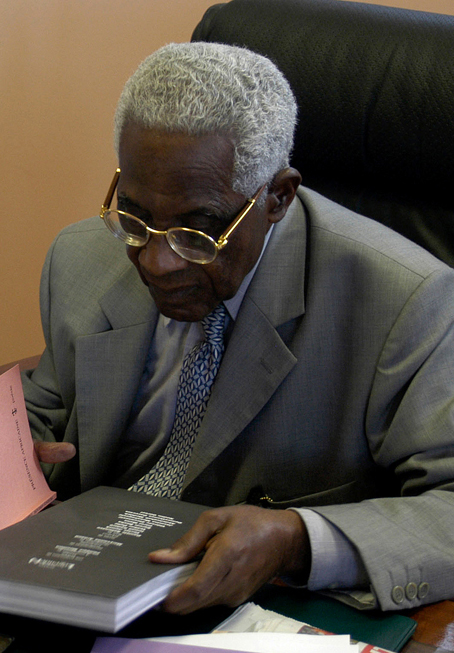
Aimé Césaire poet, playwright and author of Cahier d'un retour au pays natal. He is one of the founders of Négritude.

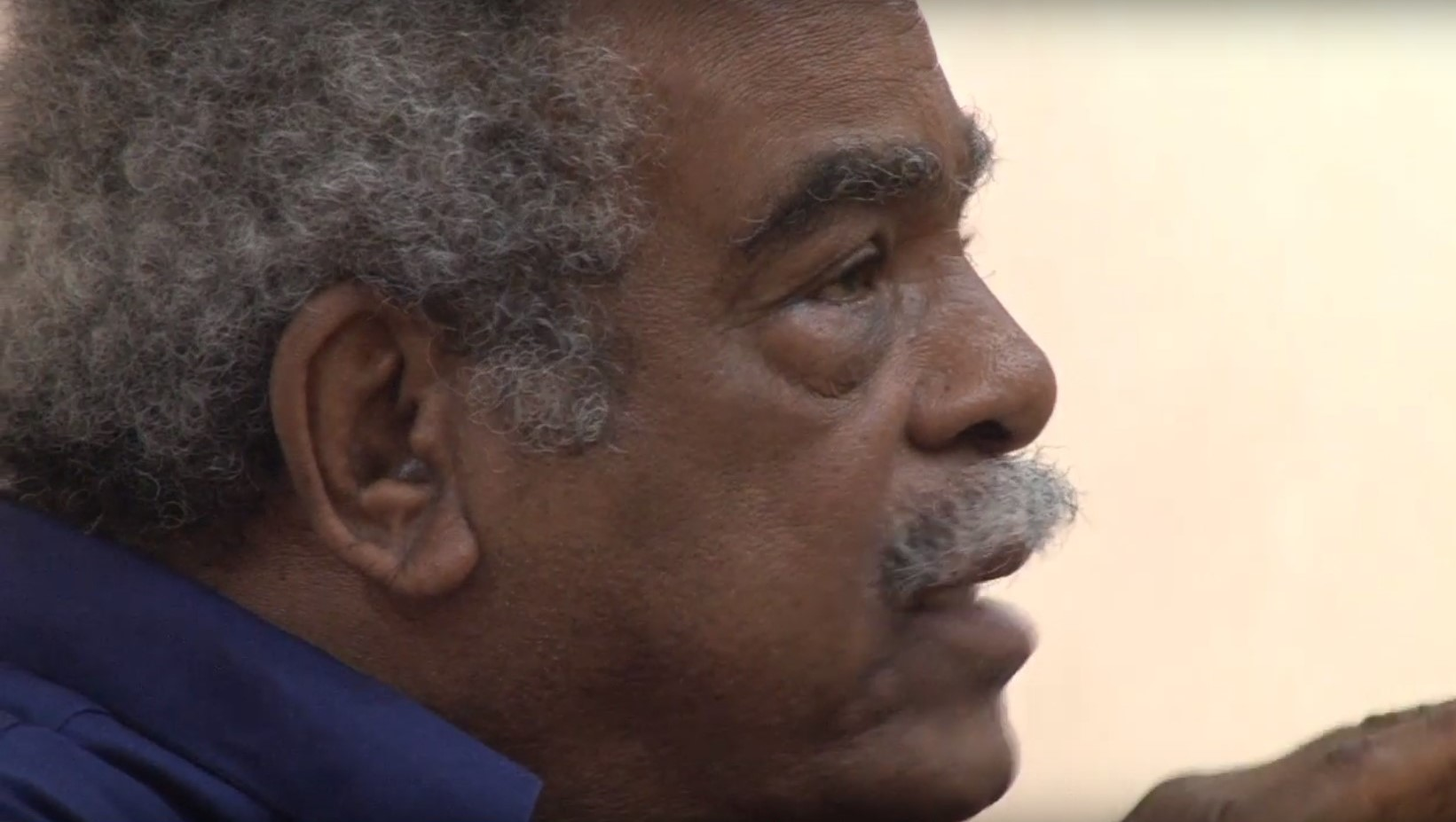
Édouard Glissant, novelist, poet, essayist and philosopher. He won the Prix Renaudot in 1958, the Prix Puterbaugh in the United States in 1989 and the Prix Roger Caillois in 1991. Edouard Glissant is the founder of the literary movement L'Antillanité and the philosophical concept "Le Tout Monde".

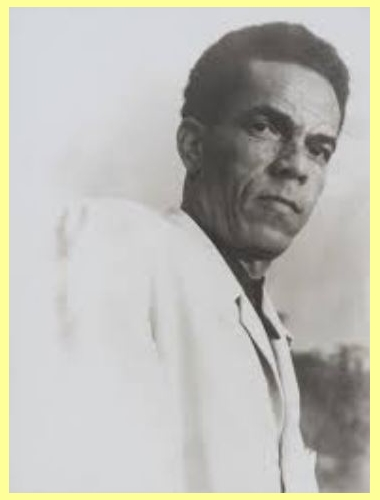
René Ménil, Philosopher, essayist, and winner of the Frantz Fanon prize in 1999. In 1932, he was amongst Martinique literary figures engaged in publishing Légitime Défense.

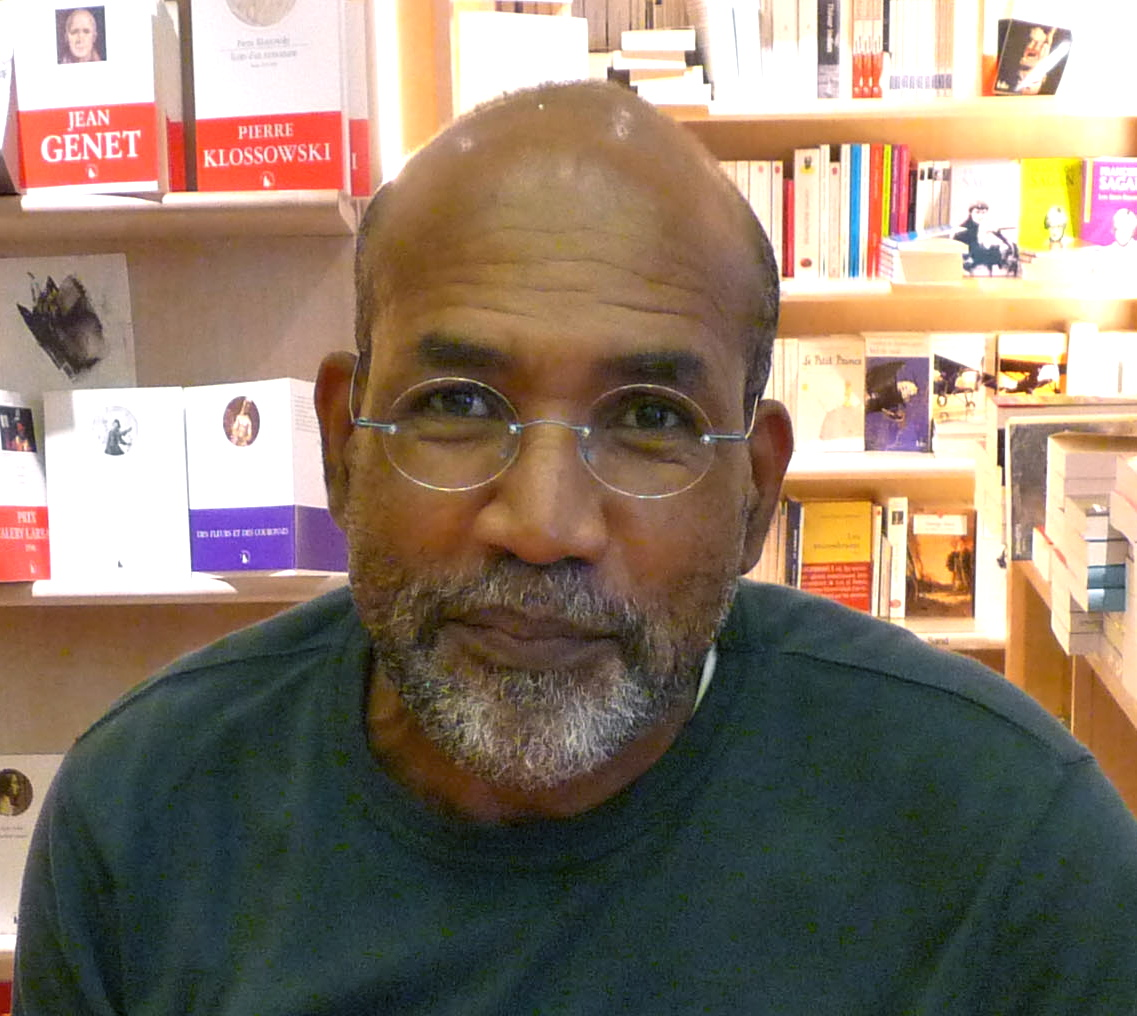
Patrick Chamoiseau, novelist awarded the Prix Goncourt in 1992 for his novel Texaco and Commander of the ordre des Arts et des Lettres in 2010. He is a co-founder of the literary movement Créolité.

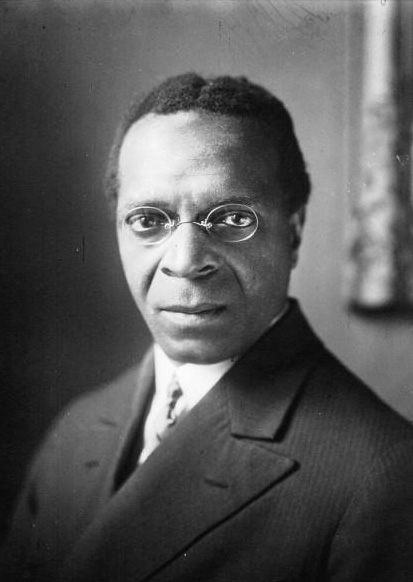
René Maran, novelist awarded the Prix Goncourt in 1921 for his novel Batouala

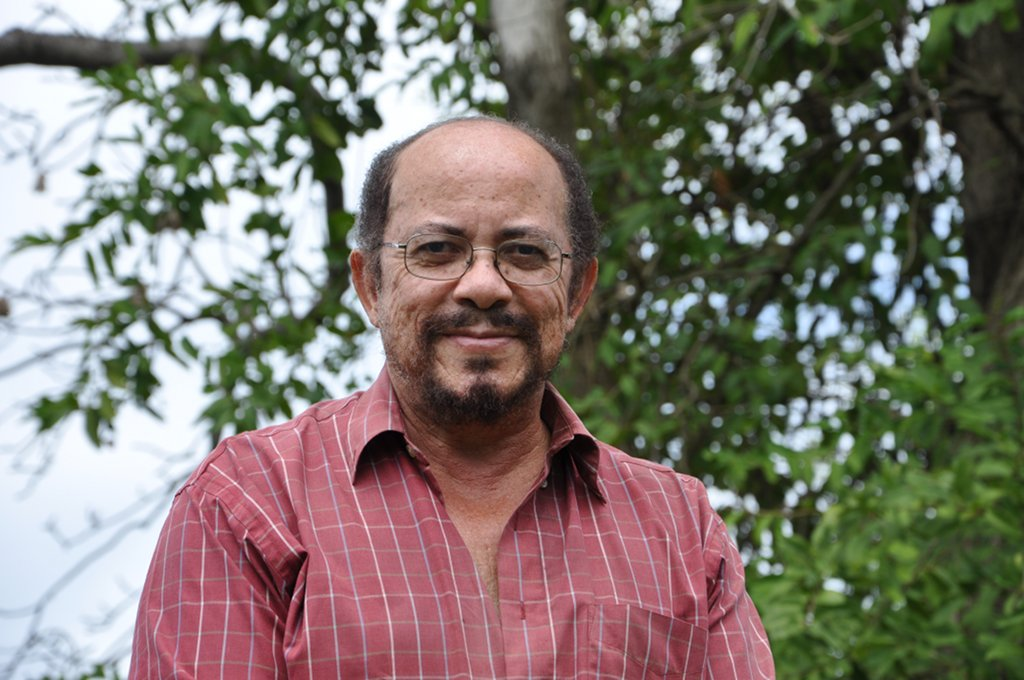
Raphaël Confiant, novelist and cofounder of the literary movement Créolité. He has won several literary prizes including the prix Novembre in 1991 for his novel Eau de café, the Shibusawa-Claudel Prize in Japan, the Antigone Prize, the Caribbean Literary Prize, the Carbet Prize and the Casa de las Américas Prize in Cuba.

A non-exhaustive list of the main novelists, poets, playwrights, essayists, sociologists, economists and historians from Martinique:

- Jacques Adélaïde-Merlande: Historian. In 2000, he was awarded an honorary degree by the University of the West Indies. He is the author of "Histoire générale des Antilles et des Guyanes, des Précolombiens à nos jours" and directed the publication of volumes 3 and 4 of the "Historial antillais" series.
- Alfred Alexandre: writer, he won the Prix des Amériques insulaires et de la Guyane in 2006 for his novel "Bord de canal". In 2020, he won the Prix Carbet de la Caraïbe et du Tout-Monde for his collection of poems "The walk of Leïla Khane".
- Sabine Andrivon-Milton: historian, founder of the Association for the Military History of Martinique and Chevalier de la Légion d'honneur, she is the author of "La Martinique pendant la Grande Guerre" a collection of poems and songs, and "Anatole dans la tourmente du Morne Siphon".
- Jean Bernabé: writer, linguist and author of several novels including Le Bailleur d'étincelle and Le Partage des ancêtres
- Daniel Boukman: writer, he won the Carbet Prize in 1992, writing Et jusqu'à la dernière pulsation de nos veines, Délivrans, and Chants pour hâter la mort du temps des Orphées ou Madinina île esclave
- Roland Brival: writer, awarded the prix RFO du livre in 2000 and chevalier de l'ordre des Arts et des Lettres in 2013
- Guy Cabort-Masson: novelist, who won the Prix de la Fondation Frantz Fanon in 1998 for La Mangrove mulâtre, Martinique, comportements et mentalité
- Nicole Cage-Florentiny: novelist who won the prix Casa de las Américas 1996 (Cuba) for Arc-en-Ciel, l'espoir, also writing C'est vole que je vole and a bilingual collection of poems, Dèyè pawol sé lanmou / Par-delà les mots l'amour
- Mayotte Capécia: novelist born in Le Carbet in 1916, the author of two major novels "I Am a Martinican Woman" and "The White Negress". She won the France-Antilles prize for "Je suis martiniquaise" in 1949
- Marie-Magdeleine Carbet: a novelist, whose best-known work is a volume of poetry titled "Rose de ta grâce". She received the Prix littéraire des Caraïbes in 1970
- Paule Cassius de Linval, writer, storyteller and poet. In 1961, his collection of tales "Mon pays à travers les légendes" won the prix Montyon
- Aimé Césaire: poet and playwright and father of the concept of négritude, Cahier d'un retour au pays natal, Discourse on Colonialism, The Tragedy of King Christophe
- Suzanne Césaire: author of Léo Frobénius et le problème des civilisations and Aurore de la liberté
- Patrick Chamoiseau: novelist awarded the prix Goncourt in 1992 for Texaco, Chronique des sept misères, Une enfance créole
- Nadia Chonville: Sociologist and novelist. She is the author of the fantasy novel "Rose de Wégastrie".
- Raphaël Confiant: novelist awarded the prix Antigone and the prix Novembre for his work Eau de café, Adèle et la Pacotilleuse, La Panse du chacal
- Jean Crusol: economist and author of Les Antilles Guyane et la Caraïbe: coopération et globalisation, Le tourisme et la Caraïbe and L'enjeu des petites Économies insulaires
- Camille Darsières: and author of: Des origines de la nation martiniquaise, Joseph Lagrosillière, socialiste colonial
- Marie-Reine de Jaham, novelist, made officer of the ordre des Arts et des Lettres in 2013, awarded the Prix littéraire des Caraïbes in 1997 and author of the best-selling novel "La Grande Béké"
- Édouard de Lépine: historian and essayist, Sur la Question dite du Statut de la Martinique, Questions sur l'histoire antillaise: trois essais sur l'abolition, l'assimilation, l'autonomie, Dix semaines qui ébranlèrent la Martinique
- Tony Delsham: a journalist and best selling novelist in the Antilles; he is author of Xavier: Le drame d'un émigré antillais, Papa, est-ce que je peux venir mourir à la maison? and "Tribunal des femmes bafouées".
- Georges Desportes: novelist, poet and essayist, the author of: Cette île qui est la nôtre, Sous l'œil fixe du soleil and Le Patrimoine martiniquais, souvenirs et réflexions.
- Suzanne Dracius: novelist awarded the prix de la Société des Poètes français Jacques Raphaël-Leygues in 2010: Negzagonal et Moun le Sid, and in 2009 Prix Fetkann Maryse Condé in the poetry category for Exquise déréliction métisse
- Miguel Duplan, a writer and teacher, he won the Prix Carbet de la Caraïbe in 2007 for his novel "L'Acier". He is also the author of the following novels "Le Discours profane" and "Un long silence de Carnaval".
- Victor Duquesnay: Martinican poet. His best-known works are "Les Martiniquaises" and "Les Chansons des Isles".
- Jude Duranty: writer in French and Martinican Creole. He is the author of "Zouki ici danse", de "La fugue de Sopaltéba" and "Les contes de Layou".
- Frantz Fanon: essayist, author of Black Skin, White Masks and The Wretched of the Earth
- Georges Fitt-Duval: poet, author of the following collections of poems: "Salut ma patrie", "Floralies-florilèges" and "Environnement, tropiques rayonnants".
- Édouard Glissant: novelist awarded the prix Renaudot in 1958. He is the author of La Lézarde, La Case du commandeur. In 1992, Edouard Glissant was a finalist for the Nobel prize in Literature, but it was the St. Lucian poet and playwright Derek Walcott who won by one vote.
- Gilbert Gratiant: a pioneer of literature Martinican Creole, writing: Fab' Compè Zicaque, Poèmes en vers faux, Sel et Sargasses.
- Simonne Henry-Valmore: ethno-psychoanalyst and essayist. She won the prix Frantz Fanon in 1988 for "Dieu en exil". She co-wrote "Aimé Césaire, le nègre inconsolé" with Roger Toumson in 1992, then "objet perdu" in 2013.
- Fabienne Kanor, novelist, awarded the Prix RFO du livre in 2007 for her novel "Humus". In 2014, she won the Prix Carbet De la Caraïbe for her novel "Faire l'aventure".
- Viktor Lazlo: novelist, singer and actor
- Étienne Léro: co-author of the literary journal Légitime défense and the journal Tropiques
- Yva Léro: novelist, Yva Léro authored "La Plaie", "Peau d'ébène" and "Doucherie".
- Georges-Henri Léotin: novelist in French and Martinican Creole. He is the author of "Memwè la tè", "Mango vèt", and "Bèlè li sid".
- Marie-Hélène Léotin, historian and executive advisor to the Territorial Collectivity of Martinique in charge of Heritage and Culture, she is the author of "Habiter le monde, Martinique 1946-2006";
- Térèz Léotin: writer in French and Martinican Creole. She is the author of the novels "Le génie de la mer", "La panthère" et "Un bonheur à crédit".
- André Lucrèce: sociologist and writer author of La pluie de Dieu, Civilisés et énergumènes, and Société et modernité
- J. Q. Louison: poet and author of the fantasy novel series Le Crocodile assassiné, Le Canari brisé and L'Ère du serpent.
- Marie-Thérèse Julien Lung-Fou: Martinican writer best known for her collections of "créole tales" published in three volumes in 1979: "Contes mes", "Contes diaboliques, fabliaux" and "Contes animaux, proverbes, titimes ou devinettes". She also wrote the essay entitled "Le Carnaval aux Antilles".
- Marcel Manville: essayist, and winner of the Frantz Fanon Prize in 1992 for his essay Les Antilles sans fard.
- René Maran: novelist awarded the prix Goncourt in 1921 for Batouala, Un homme pareil aux autres
- Georges Mauvois: novelist, playwright he won the Casa de las Américas Prize 2004 for Ovando ou Le magicien de Saint-Domingue, Agénor Cacoul, Man Chomil.
- Alfred Melon-Degras, writer, poet and academic. He is the author of"Le silence", "Battre le rappel" and "Avec des si, avec des mains".
- René Ménil, philosopher and essayist. In 1999, he received the Frantz Fanon Prize for his essay "Antilles déjà jadis".He was also co-founder in 1932 of the journal Légitime Défense and with Aimé Césaire of the cultural review Tropiques in 1941. He is the author of "Tracées : Identité, négritude, esthétique aux Antilles" and "Pour l'émancipation et l'identité du peuple martiniquais". René Ménil, and with Césaire, Fanon and Glissant is one of Martinique's greatest thinkers.
- Monchoachi: the pen name of André Pierre-Louis, a writer in French and Martinican Creole, he won the Carbet Prize and the prix Max-Jacob in 2003. His works include L'Espère-geste, Lakouzémi, Nostrom and Lémistè
- Paulette Nardal: co-founder of the journal, La Revue du Monde Noir in 1932 and one of the inspirations of the négritude movement
- Jeanne Nardal: Writer, philosopher and essayist, sister of Paulette Nardal
- Armand Nicolas: Martinican historian. He is the author of "Histoire de la Martinique", "La révolution antiesclavagiste de mai 1848 à La Martinique", and "L'Insurrection du Sud à la Martinique, septembre 1870".
- Gaël Octavia, writer, playwright
- Xavier Orville: novelist, who won the Frantz Fanon prize in 1993. He wrote Le Corps absent de Prosper Ventura, Le Parfum des belles de nuit.
- Gilbert Pago: historian and author of "1848 : Chronique de l'abolition de l'esclavage en Martinique", "L'insurrection de Martinique 1870–1871", and "Lumina Sophie dite Surprise (1848–1879): insurgée et bagnarde".
- Roger Parsemain: Poet and novelist. He is the author of "L'œuvre des volcans", "l'absence du destin" and "Il chantait des boléros".
- Eric Pézo, Writer and novelist in French and Martinican Creole, author of the novels : "L'amour sinon rien"; in Martinican Creole, "lanmou épi sé tout", "Marie-Noire", and "Passeurs de rives" and "Lasotjè", a work of poetry.
- Daniel Picouly: writer, tv host and winner of the Prix Renaudot for L'Enfant Léopard
- Vincent Placoly: winner of the prix Frantz Fanon in 1991. Author of Une journée torride, La vie et la mort de Marcel Gonstran, L'eau-de-mort guildive
- Alain Rapon, novelist and storyteller. He is the author of the novel "La Présence de l'Absent" and received the Prix littéraire des Caraïbes in 1983. He is also the author of "Ti soleil", "Ti-Fène et la rivière qui chante", "Itinéraire d'un Esprit perdu" and "Danse, petit nègre danse".
- Clément Richer: Martinican novelist and author of "L'homme de la Caravelle". In 1941 and 1948 he was awarded the Prix Paul Flat by the Académie française for his novel "Le dernier voyage de Pembroke" and "La croisière de la Priscilla" and the Prix Marianne in 1939. His novel "Ti Coyo et son requin" has been translated into English, German, Spanish, Danish and Dutch and adapted for film by Italo Calvino as Tiko and the Shark.
- Jean-Marc Rosier: writer in French and Martinican Creole. He won the prix Sonny Rupaire for his novel in Creole, "An lavi chimérik" in 1999, then the prix Carbet de la Caraïbe for his novel "Noirs néons" in 2008 and in the poetry category of the prix Fetkann Maryse Condé for "Urbanîle" in 2015.
- Julienne Salvat: writer, poet, she is the author of Feuillesonge, La lettre d'Avignon
- Juliette Sméralda: sociologist, author of L'Indo-Antillais entre Noirs et Békés, Peau noire cheveu crépu, l'histoire d'une aliénation
- Daniel Thaly: Martinican poet, and librarian of the Schœlcher Library from 1939 to 1945.
- Raphaël Tardon: writer, author of "La Caldeira" and "Starkenfirst", which received the grand prix littéraire des Antilles in 1948. In 1967, Raphaël Tardon was posthumously awarded the Prix littéraire des Caraïbes in recognition of his life's work.
- Louis-Georges Tin: essayist and academic, the author of Esclavage et réparations : Comment faire face aux crimes de l'histoire and author of a dictionary that documents the history of the treatment of homosexuals in all regions of the world.
- Simone Yoyotte: She was the only woman to participate in producing the literary journal Légitime Défense published in 1932 by young Martinican intellectuals in Paris and considered one of the founding acts of the Négritude movement.
- Joseph Zobel: A novelist, and winner of the Frantz Fanon Prize in 1994. He is the author of : La Rue Cases-Nègres

=== Other personalities ===
- Antoine Lavalette (1708–1767), Jesuit missionary to Martinique, slave owner whose debts led to the banning of the Jesuits in France.
- Hippolyte Morestin, doctor, associate professor of anatomy and specialist in reconstructive surgery
- Harry Roselmack, journalist
- Karine Baste, journalist
- Manon Tardon, fought with the French Resistance in the Second World War
- Jane Léro, communist and feminist activist and founder of the Union des Femmes de la Martinique (l'UFM; Union of Women of Martinique
- Soa de Muse, drag performer, finalist in first ever season of Drag Race France

== Energy ==
Martinique is part of the zones not interconnected to the continental metropolitan network (ZNI), which must therefore produce the electricity they consume themselves. For this reason, the ZNI have specific legislation on electricity production and distribution.

Martinique's energy mix is marked by a very strong importance of thermal energy production. At the same time, the island's electricity consumption has decreased slightly. These results can be attributed to the information and awareness-raising efforts of the regions, the Agency for the Environment and Energy Management (ADEME) and energy companies in favor of energy savings, but also to the context of demographic decline of the territory.

Despite these results, the control of the Territory's electricity consumption remains a central issue, given the Territory's low energy potential compared to other overseas territories, such as Guadeloupe and Reunion.

Martinique and its inhabitants are therefore faced with a twofold need: to further strengthen the control of electricity consumption and at the same time develop renewable energies to reduce environmental pollution due to thermal electricity production.

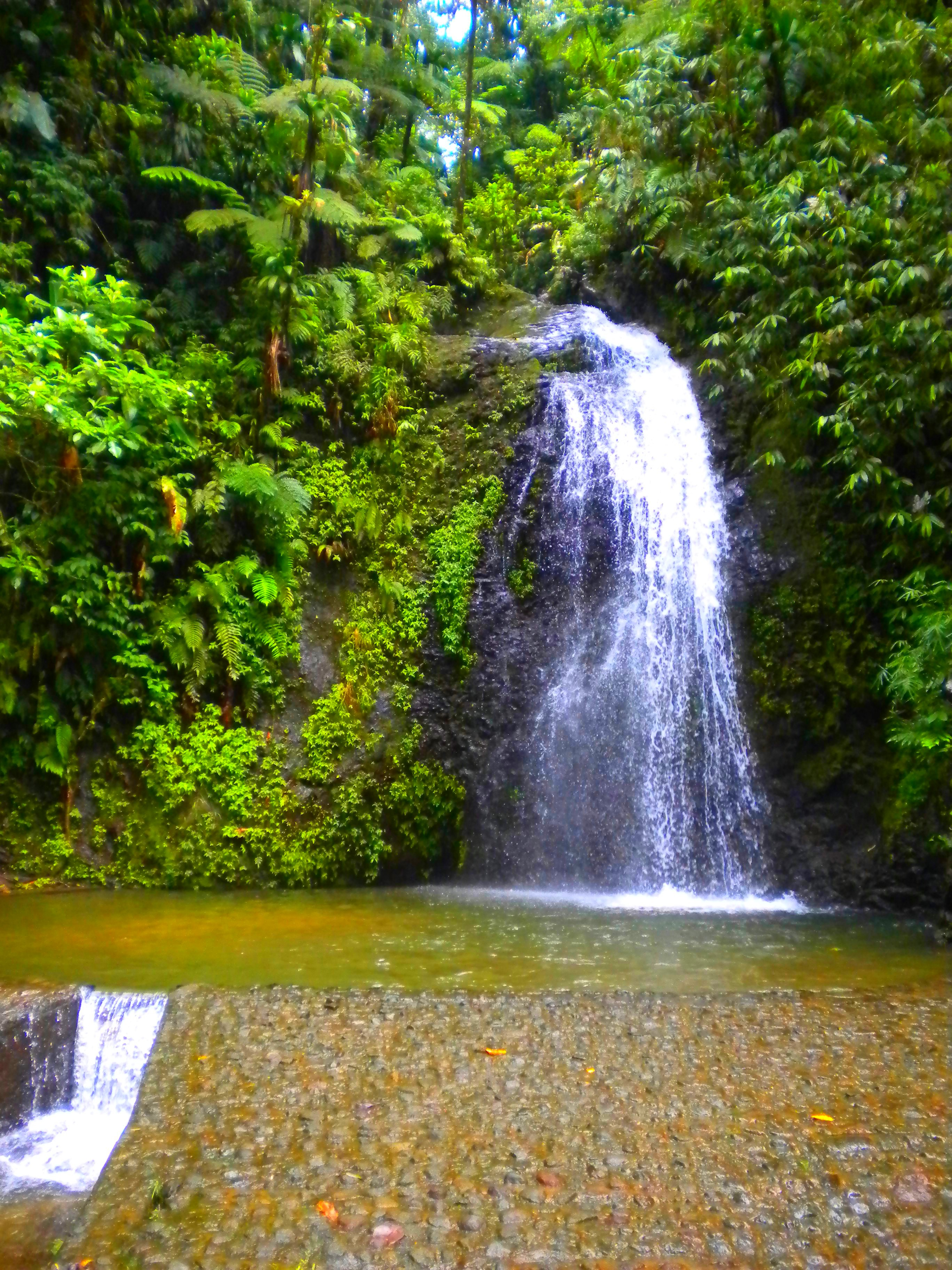
Saut-Gendarme waterfall

=== Renewable energies ===
The exploitation of renewable energies in Martinique started late, as the characteristics of the island were previously considered unfavorable for their development. However, the efforts of the population and energy suppliers are moving towards a higher proportion of renewable energies in Martinique's future energy mix.

Article 56 of the Grenelle I Law No. 2009-967 3 August 2009, on the implementation of the Grenelle Environment Forum, sets out the provisions for overseas: in the case of Martinique, the energy objective is to reach 50% renewable energy in final consumption by 2020. Energy autonomy is planned for 2030.

As Martinique's electricity distribution grid is not interconnected with neighboring islands, let alone with the mainland's metropolitan grid, the decree of 23 April 2008, applies to the management of so-called intermittent energies: wind, photovoltaic and marine: any solar and wind power production facility with a capacity exceeding 3 kWp and not equipped with a storage system is liable to be disconnected from the grid by the grid manager once the threshold of 30% of random active power injected into the grid has been reached.

Thus, the achievement of the objectives of the Grenelle I law is subject to the development of Structures with a maximum power of 3 kWp or less, or to the incorporation of storage devices in production facilities.

=== Water ===
90% of the water distributed by Martinique's drinking water network comes from Rainwater intakes in five catchment areas. Thus, although there is no shortage of water, the situation becomes very critical in the Lenten period, with abstractions leading to the drying up of several rivers.

Water resources are abundant but unevenly distributed: Four municipalities (Saint-Joseph, Gros-Morne, le Lorrain and Fort-de-France) provide 85% of Martinique's drinking water.

There is no water catchment in the south of the island. The water consumed in the South comes exclusively from abstractions from the North and the center (mainly from the Blanche River which flows into the Lézarde, the Capot, and the Dumauzé). Thus, 60% of the total is extracted from a single river (the Lézarde and its tributary, the Blanche river). This concentration of abstractions can constitute a risk in a crisis situation, such as a drought for example.

== Health ==
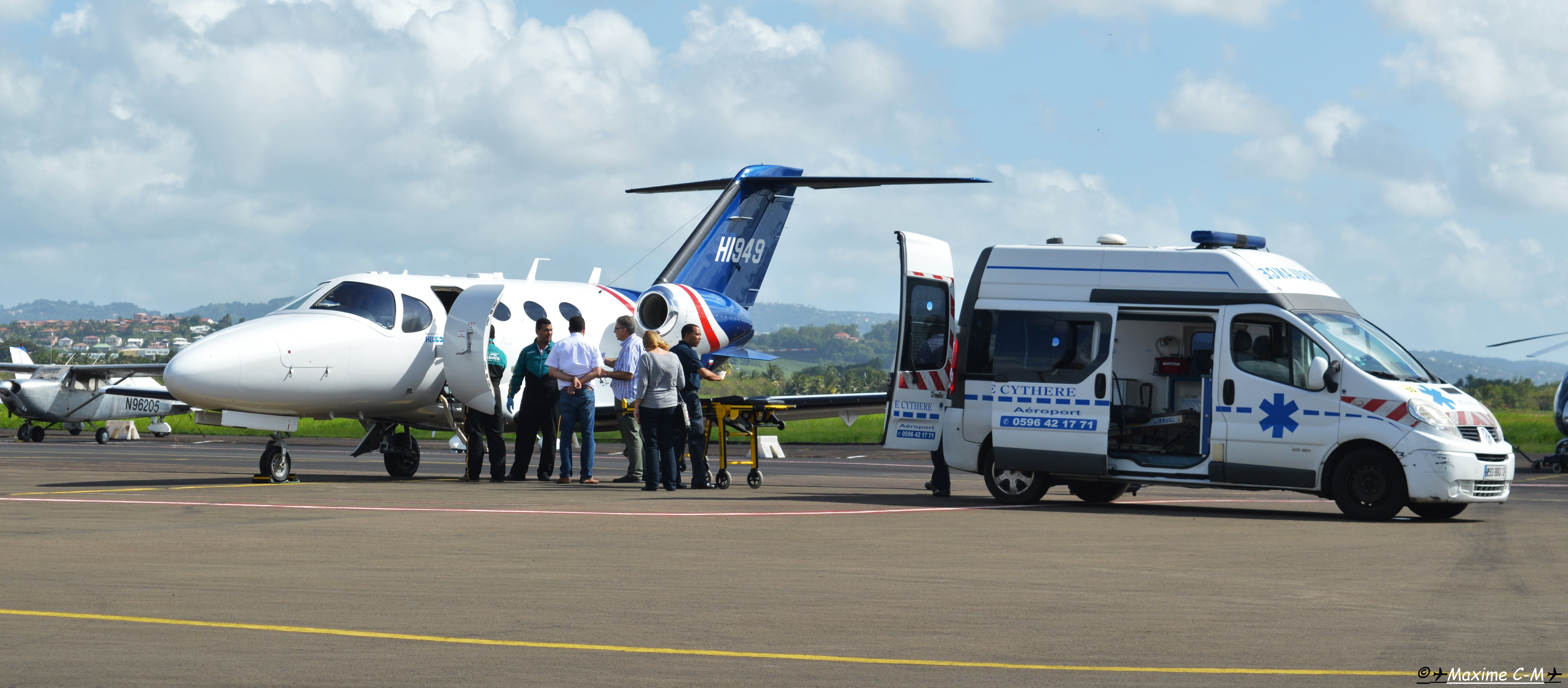
A patient is transferred between aircraft and ambulance at Martinique Aimé Césaire International Airport.

=== Regional health agency ===
A regional health agency for Martinique (Agence régionale de santé Martinique) was set up in 2010. It is responsible for applying French health policy in the territory, managing public health and health care regulations.

=== Healthcare professionals ===
As of 1 January 2018, Martinique had a workforce of 1,091 doctors. For each 100,000 people of its population, there was a density of 141 general practitioners, 150 specialists, 53 dentists, 1,156 state certified nurses and 90 pharmacists. Self-employed doctors are represented by URML Martinique, created under the Hospital, patients, health, territories bill. URML Martinique works in partnership with ARS Martinique, l'Assurance Maladie, the Ministry of Health and Local Authorities to manage regional health policy.

=== Health facilities ===
The University Hospital of Martinique (Le Centre Hospitalier Universitaire de Martinique) is a teaching hospital based in Fort-de-France, in an agreement with the University of the French Antilles. It is the largest French- and English-speaking university hospital in the Caribbean, having more than 1,600 beds. These include 680 medical, 273 surgical and 100 obstetrics beds, with another 30 in its intensive care unit. The hospital operates a 24-hour emergency service.

=== Chlordecone controversy ===
==== Actions of the French government ====
After the discovery of the toxicity of chlordecone, a dangerous insecticide, and the health risks it posed, the French state put in place certain measures to protect the Martinican and Guadeloupean populations, allocating nearly 100 million euros towards the implementation of these measures. The soils are regularly tested and subjected to strict regulations related to the standards of potability. Martinique is also subject to regular mapping processes to delineate highly contaminated areas. River fishing is also prohibited in order to limit health risks, as rivers represent high-risk contamination areas.

Since 2008, the French state has developed three action plans establishing strategies to protect local populations, raise awareness regarding the effects of chlordecone, as well as to support the agriculture and fisheries sectors.

A French parliamentary commission revealed in 2019 that more than 90% of Martinicans have been exposed to chlordecone, which was authorized for use between 1972 and 1993 in the banana plantations of the Antilles. The committee judged the three "Chlordecone Plans" launched by the State since 2008 to be inadequate; recommendations were provided via its rapporteur, Justine Benin MP, to address prevention and research into cleanup methods for a fourth plan, scheduled for 2020.

The parliamentary commission of inquiry called the French state into question for having authorized the sale of chlordecone as an insecticide, as its toxicity was known, but "responsibilities are shared with economic actors. Firstly, industrialists, but also groups of planters and certain elected officials."

==== Health consequences ====
Chlordecone is known to have harmful effects on human health, with scientific research identifying it as an endocrine disruptor or hormonally-active chemical agent, as well as a probable carcinogen, particularly in relation to increasing chances of prostate cancer occurrence and recurrence. As an endocrine disruptor, chlordecone can also lead to delayed cognitive development in infants, an increased likelihood of pregnancy complications, and may disrupt the reproductive process.

The chlordecone molecule has physical and chemical characteristics that allow it to remain for several centuries in soil, river-water and groundwater, thus spreading beyond the location of the banana plantations where this insecticide was initially administered. Although chlordecone has not been used since the 1990s, the health risks remain. Chlordecone contamination occurs through contaminated food and drink.

==== Local community response ====
In the streets of Fort-de-France, approximately 5,000 to 15,000 residents of Martinique demonstrated in protest on 27 March 2021, denouncing the possible statute of limitations on a complaint filed by civil parties for the use of chlordecone in causing life endangerment (mise en danger de la vie d'autrui). The complaint was issued on 23 February 2006.

The French government's actions in response to the historical authorization of chlordecone are often criticized by residents of Martinique and local associations involved in the "Chlordecone Scandal." The lack of information transmitted to the population concerning the danger of chlordecone between 1993 and 2004 is one of the main concerns expressed.

The civil complaint in 2006 was issued by several associations from the islands of Martinique and Guadeloupe, and was in response to the long-term impacts of government-authorized chlordecone use in polluting the islands' natural environments and affecting the health of inhabitants.

=== COVID-19 pandemic ===
Martinique's first cases of coronavirus (COVID-19) were confirmed in March 2020. The pandemic has since put provision of health services under significant stress; as of 2 September 2021, Martinique had recorded an excess mortality at all ages, and of all causes since the week beginning 26 July 2021.

== In popular culture ==
- In 1887, the artist Paul Gauguin lived in Martinique. Gauguin painted the tropical landscape and the native women. The Paul Gauguin Interpretation Centre (former Gauguin Museum) is dedicated to his stay on the island.
- Aimé Césaire's seminal poem Cahier d'un retour au pays natal (Notebook of a Return to the Native Land) (1939 - 1956) envisions the poet's imagined journey back to his homeland Martinique to find it in a state of colossal poverty and psychological inferiority due to the French colonial presence.
- Lafcadio Hearn in 1890 published a travel book titled Two Years in the French West Indies, in which Martinique [Martinique Sketches] is its main topic; his descriptions of the island, people and history are lively observations of life before the Mont Pelée eruption in 1902 that would change the island forever. The Library of America republished his works in 2009 entitled Hearn: American Writings.

== See also ==
- 2009 French Caribbean general strikes
- Bibliography of Martinique
- Index of Martinique-related articles
- Le Tour de Yoles Rondes de Martinique
- List of colonial and departmental heads of Martinique
- Regional Council of Martinique
