= La Revue du Monde Noir =

French periodical

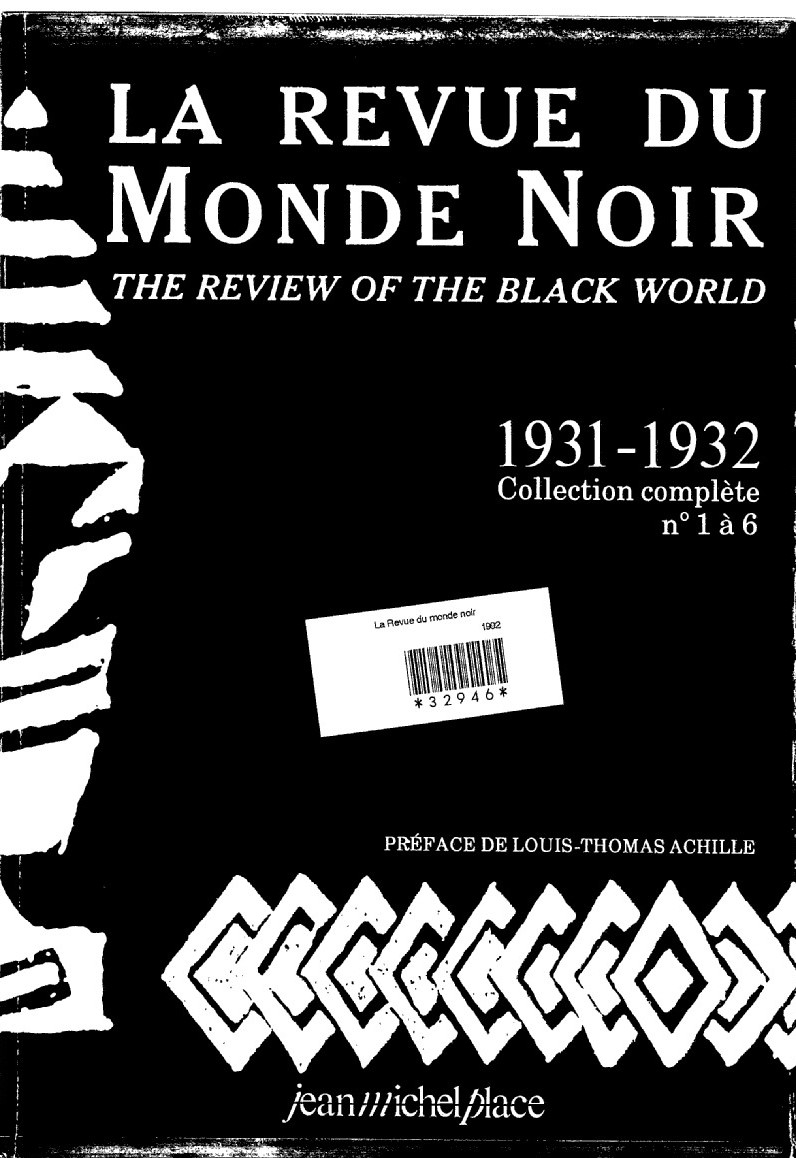
Preface of La Revue Du Monde Noir 1931–1932

La Revue Du Monde Noir was a periodical created and edited by Paulette and Jane Nardal in 1931, France. The publication ran for a course of six months and contained a wide variety of content including essays, short stories, and poems. A great deal of the articles were situated in the anti-imperialist, negritude, and Harlem Renaissance movements. As such, some of the primary focuses included anti-colonial politics and promoting black consciousness. This ultimately was a source of controversy which led to a loss of funding and the end of the periodical. Including a wide variety of prominent thinkers from around the world La Revue Du Monde Noir concerns itself with a wide range of issues such as economics and farming (Senateur Price-Mars), art (Louis Th. Achille), eugenics (Georges Gregory) and more.

== Motto ==
The inaugural volume began by detailing the goals of the periodical. The three aims included: creating a space for black voices and publications, popularizing interests and concerns of the black race, and, finally, creating bonds of solidarity and fidelity.

"Our motto is and will continue to be:

For PEACE, WORK, and JUSTICE

By LIBERTY, EQUALITY, and FRATERNITY.

Thus, the two hundred million individuals which constitute one Negro race, even though scattered among the various nations, will form over and above the latter a great Brotherhood, the forerunner of universal Democracy."

== Historical context ==
Throughout 1919–1935 significant shifts were beginning to happen around ideas about race and cultural differences. It was in this climate of change and renewal that "La Revue Du Monde Noir" was in publication. Sometimes termed as a "diasporic" journal, the publication was intended to draw together the voices of black people around the globe. In the first journal, Louis-Jean Finot wrote an article titled "Race Equality." After some consideration of the problems facing different countries across the world, he called for a "solidarity between nations" and wrote "at the present time, selfishness is not only stupid, it is criminal." This focus is in fitting with the periodical's aims which explicitly situated creating a sense of community as one of their primary goals.

"La Revue Du Monde Noir" also took place as the Negritude movement began to take root. The Negritude movement occurred throughout the 1930s among communities of displaced black and African people primarily throughout Europe. Combining artistic and political approaches, the Negritude movement responded to the realities of what life under colonialism looked like. Where black voices were historically devalued and silenced, the Negritude movement did exactly the opposite. Exalting the numerous political, cultural, artistic, and philosophic perspectives of black people was one of the key focuses of the movement at large. Notably, some of the founders of the movement (Léon Damas, Léopold Senghor and Aimé Césaire) would go on to mention the journal as an influential piece of how they developed their thinking.

At the same time, the Harlem Renaissance was occurring in the United States, primarily in the city of Harlem. As slavery came to an end, many black people migrated to cities further North seeking greater rights and freedoms than those which were possible in the South. This movement is often known as the "Great Migration." Much like the Negritude movement in Europe, the Harlem Renaissance gave voice to a group of people which had historically been silenced and ignored. Several of the key people in this movement also contributed to "La Revue Du Monde Noir" notably including Claude Mac Kay.

Bringing together French thinkers at the time and American writers participating in the Harlem Renaissance, the journal furthered the development of both perspectives. These thinkers worked together to develop a "black aesthetic" and a sense of pride in the racial identity.

== Controversy ==
One of the key issues faced by the periodical was that it positioned itself as "apolitical." This was mainly the result of two considerations. Firstly, it was intended to keep the periodical from drawing the attention of potential colonial authorities. Secondly, this was a practical concern intended to make funding easier to access. Despite Paulette Nardal's claims that the project was cultural and not political, the contents included some articles which were controversy politically subversive. An example of this would be an article put forth by Etienne Lero and René Menil wherein they condemned both French Colonialism and the "Caribbean bourgeoisie of color." Ultimately, all of this controversy led to a loss of funding which is why after only six months, the periodical had to end.

== Contributors ==
=== Volume 1 ===
- Louis-Jean Finot
- Maître Jean-Louis
- Sénateur Price-Mars
- Docteur Léo Sajous
- Georges Gregory
- Paulette Nardal
- Claude Mac Kay
- John Matheus
- Louis Th. Achille
- G. Joseph-Henri

=== Volume 2 ===
- Emile Sicard
- C. Renaud-Molinet
- Léo Sajous
- Clara W. Shepard
- E. Gregoire-Micheli
- Louis Th. Achille
- Lionel Attuly
- Etienne Lero
- Jules Monnerot
- Magd. Raney
- Roberte Horth
- Andrée Nardal
- Joseph Folliet

=== Volume 3 ===
- Lionel Attuly
- Docteur A. Marie
- Docteur Zaborowski
- Guy Zuccarelli
- René Menil
- René Maran
- Langston Hughes
- Claude Mac Kay
- F. Eboue
- Étienne Lero
- R. Horth
- M. Raney
- L.- Th. Achille
- Clara W. Shepard
- Gisèle Dubouille

=== Volume 4 ===
- Philippe de Zara
- H.M. Bernelot-Moens
- Guetatcheou Zaougha
- Roland Rene-Boisneuf
- Léo Sajous
- Clara W. Shepard
- M. Bazargan
- René Menil
- G. Gratiant
- Yadhé
- Cugo Lewis
- Pierre B. Salzmann

=== Volume 5 ===
- L. Th. Beaudza
- H. Ross-Martin
- Léo Frobenius
- Jean L. Bareau
- Guy Zuccarelli
- P. Thoby-Marcelin
- Marcel Boucard
- P. Augarde
- Walter White
- P. Baye-Salzmann
- F. Malval

=== Volume 6 ===
- Colonel Nemours
- L.A Revue Mondiale
- Lionel Attuly
- L.-Th. Beaudza
- P. Baye-Salzmann
- Paulette Nardal
- Félix Eboue
- M. Grall
- Flavia Leopold
- G.-D. Perier
- Magd Raney
- Etienne Lero
