= Simone Yoyotte =

French writer (c. 1910–1933)

Simone Yoyotte (c. 1910 – 1933), also known as Symone Monnerot, was a Martinican poet and intellectual.

Born in Martinique, she settled in Paris, where she joined the literary scene. She was the only woman to participate in the literary journal Légitime Défense, co-founded in 1932 by the Martinican writers Étienne Léro, René Méril, and Jules Monnerot—who would later become her husband. Légitime Défense was considered foundational to the Négritude movement, and its members also advocated for communist revolution while condemning the French-speaking black bourgeoisie. She helped drive women's contributions to this literary movement, alongside other female writers such as Yva Léro; Paulette, Jeanne, and Andrée Nardal; and Suzanne Césaire. Her brother Pierre Yoyotte was also a surrealist poet.

She is recognized as the first woman of African descent to participate in the Surrealist movement, publishing her work in the Surrealist periodical Le Surrealisme au service de la revolution in the early 1930s.

Yoyotte died very young in 1933, only a few months after her marriage to Jules Monnerot.

Little is known about her life, but her work marks a significant turning point in Caribbean literature. It has also influenced the work of later writers including China Miéville.

== Légitime Défense ==
Légitime Défense, the literary journal written by Yoyotte and the other Martinican students, focused on anti-colonialism, especially in the context of French Imperialism. French authorities essentially banned the journal by suspending the students' grants. This ensured that no more copies could be printed and distributed, especially to the Caribbean. The journal has not been examined as extensively as some other Surrealist journals from this period and has been criticized by some for failing to advocate for the independence of Africa or the Caribbean, and on the grounds that its ideas are derived from Marxism. However, this early criticism mostly comes from scholarship that may be considered Eurocentric and may need reexamining.
