= Georges Gratiant =

Martinican lawyer and politician

President of the General Council of Martinique
- In office 1946–1947

Mayor of Le Lamentin
- In office 1959–1989

Personal details
- Born: 6 January 1907 Saint-Esprit, Martinique
- Died: 20 June 1992 (aged 85) Le Lamentin, Martinique
- Party: Martinican Communist Party
- Spouse: Jenny Gratiant
- Occupation: lawyer

Georges Gratiant (6 January 1907-20 June 1992) was a lawyer and politician from Martinique. He was mayor of Le Lamentin from 1959 to 1989 and president of the General Council from 1946 to 1947.

== Biography ==
=== Youth and early activism ===
Georges Gratiant was born on 6 January 1907 in the commune of Saint-Esprit in Martinique, part of a well-to-do family. After his secondary education at the Lycée Schœlcher where he obtained his baccalaureate, Gratiant studied law in France. He obtained a law degree and was admitted to the bar in Fort-de-France as a lawyer. Sensitive to the poverty of his fellow Martinicians, Marxist ideas appealed to him; he became a communist activist.

He founded the "Common Front" group in the early 1930s with René Ménil, Victor Lamon and Thélus Léro. In 1936, they merged with the "Jean Jaurès" group, then formed the Région Communiste de la Martinique in 1938.

From 1941 to 1943 Gratiant participated with René Ménil, Aristide Maugée, Aimé and Suzanne Césaire in editing the journal Tropiques, which worked “To affirm the uniqueness of the culture of the Caribbean and its African roots” and “to say no to the shadows”. The arrival of a large contingent from France to enforce the Vichy regime made the subordination of the new department clear; and its Chief of Information Services for Martinique, Lt de Vaisseau Bayle, also took a dim view of the journal, interdicting it as “a revolutionary review that is racial and sectarian”. This was their response:

To Lieutenant de Vaisseau Bayle:

Sir, We have received your indictment of Tropiques.

“Racists”, “sectarians”, “revolutionaries”, “ingrates and traitors to the country”, “poisoners of souls”, none of these epithets really repulses us. “Poisoners of Souls”, like Racine… “Ingrates and traitors to our good Country”, like Zola… “Revolutionaries”, like the Hugo of “Châtiments”. “Sectarians”, passionately, like Rimbaud and Lautréamont. Racists, yes. Of the racism of Toussaint Louverture, of Claude McKay and Langston Hughes against that of Drumont and Hitler. As to the rest of it, don’t expect for us to plead our case, nor vain recriminations, nor discussion. We do not speak the same language.

Signed: Aimé Césaire, Suzanne Césaire, Georges Gratiant, Aristide Maugée, René Ménil, Lucie Thesée.

— Tropiques, vol. 1, ed. by Aime Cesaire

=== Post-war period ===
On Liberation in 1945, Gratiant supported assimilation with France, a view common to communists of the time, and took an active part in making it succeed. In 1946 he was elected the first President of the General Council of the new Department of Martinique, and served in the position until 1947.

In 1948, during the "Affair of the Basse-Pointe 16", Gratiant was one of the lawyers defending the sixteen farm workers charged with the murder of a white creole administrator on the Leyritz estate in Basse-Pointe. At the trial in Bordeaux in 1951, his plea contributed greatly to the acquittal of the farm workers.

On 21–22 September 1957, Gratiant helped to found the P.C.M. (Martinican Communist Party) together with René Ménil, Léopold Bissol and Victor Lamon. The P.C.M's slogan was "autonomy for Martinique". On 14 February 1960, the P.C.M. adopted a new draft status for Martinique, proposing an autonomous territory federated to the French Republic. The powers of the territory would be exercised by a Legislative Assembly and a Council of Government.

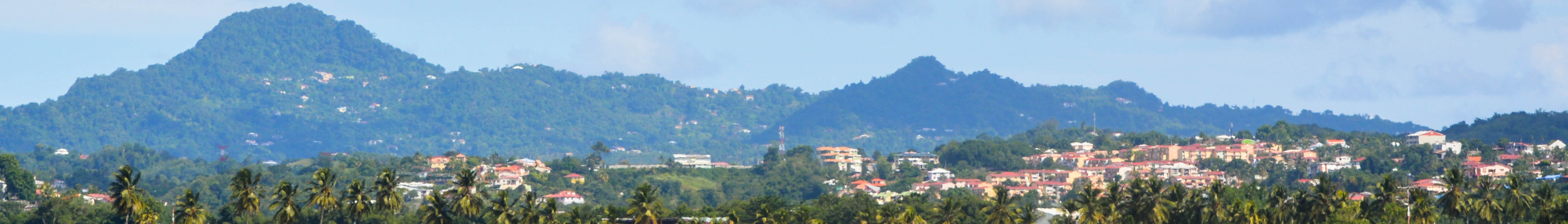
Le Lamentin

On the 24th March 1961, during the strike of the agricultural workers of Le Lamentin, gendarmes shot at the crowd, causing the death of three workers. At their funeral, Gratiant gave the poetic speech "Discours sur les trois tombes": "Whoever wants bread will get lead, in the name of the law, in the name of force, in the name of France, in the name of the force of the law that comes from France." This speech provoked the anger of the Minister of the Armed Forces, Pierre Messmer, who took Gratiant to court. He was given a suspended sentence and fined, but appealed and finally won his case. The loss of life is memorialised on a plaque at rue Hardy de Saint-Omer near the place that it occurred, in Le Lamentin.

Georges Gratiant spent his life fighting against injustice through his work as a lawyer, often at his own risk. He was actively anti-colonial, notably during the O.J.A.M. affair and during the strike of 1974.

=== Retirement from politics ===
In 1989 Gratiant, after having been mayor of Le Lamentin for thirty years, the commune having become the second largest city in Martinique, announced that he would not stand for re-election and supports the candidacy of his first deputy Pierre Samot.

After gradually withdrawing from politics, Gratiant died on 20 June 1992 at the age of 85.

== Memorials ==
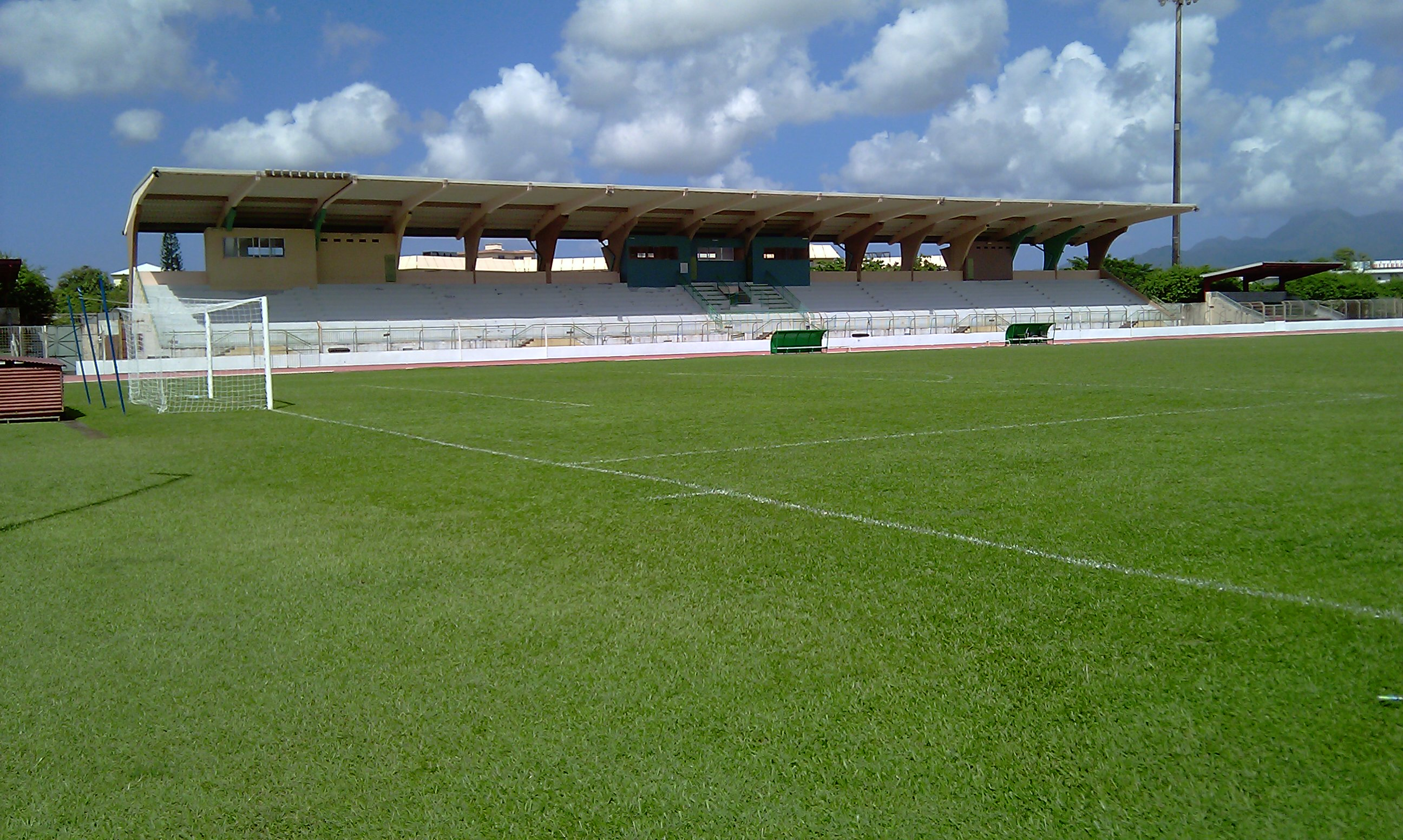
Georges Gratiant stadium

In his honour, the Place d'Armes stadium in Le Lamentin, the second largest stadium in Martinique, was named the Georges Gratiant stadium in 1993, the year after his death.

An avenue in Le Lamentin is named after him, as is a street in Fort-de-France.

== List of offices ==
- 1945 - 1956 : First Deputy Mayor of Fort-de-France
- 1945 - 1961 : General Councillor of Fort-de-France
- 1946 - 1947 : President of the General Council of Martinique
- 1959 - 1989 : Mayor of Le Lamentin
- 1970 - 1985 : General Councillor of the canton of Le Lamentin
- 1983 - 1990 : Regional Councillor of Martinique
- 1985 - 1988 : General Councillor of the canton of Le Lamentin-3-Est

== See also ==
- Georges Gratiant, un avocat dans le siècle. Georges Mauvois - K Editions 3 - December 2008.
