= Louis-Thomas Achille =

Louis-Thomas Achille (August 31, 1909 – May 11, 1994) was a Martiniquais intellectual, educator and musician. He was an important participant in the Negritude movement, collaborating with his cousins Jane and Paulette Nardal in founding the journal La Revue du Monde Noir. After World War II he settled in Lyon, teaching at the Lycée du Parc. There he founded an English choir, the Parc Glee Glub, which specialised in Negro spirituals.

== Life ==
Achille was born on August 31, 1909, in Fort-de-France, the son of Louis Achille, an associate professor at the university.

In the late 1920s Achille joined the Sunday 'circle of friends' of his cousins, the Nardal sisters, at their house in Clamart. He later recalled the "dominant feminine mood" of these afternoon gatherings, centred around English tea, as well as their informally performative atmosphere:

Alternating with the piano, readings or recitations of Antillean poems by Daniel Thaly and E. Flavia Léopold, or poems by Gilbert Gratiant written in Creole, provided a literary interlude. Sometimes a chorus formed on the spur of the moment to read through Negro American 'spirituals' or 'blues'.

In the 1930s Achille taught French language and literature at Howard University in Washington, D.C., and at the University of Atlanta. From 1943 to 1945 he fought for the Free French Forces.

Achille attended the First Congress of Black Writers and Artists in Paris in 1956. He raised the question there whether Africans called themselves Black, "an expression that, indeed, has been imposed from outside, by the colonizing nations".

He died on May 11, 1994.

In April 2022 his collection of documents and music was donated to the Part-Dieu municipal library of Lyon.

== Works ==
- 'L'Art et le noir', Revue de Monde Noir, No. 2 (December 1932), pp. 28–31
- 'L'artiste noir et son peuple', Présence africaine, New Series, 16 (Oct-Nov 1957), pp. 32–52
- 'In Memoriam: Paulette Nardal', Présence africaine 133–134 (1985)
