= Afro-Surrealism =

Genre of art and literature

- Also known as: Afrosurrealism
- Type: Artistic and cultural movement
- Period: 20th century-present
- Influences: Surrealism; Negritude; African diasporic traditions
- Related Movements: Afrofuturism; Surrealism; Negritude
- Disciplines: Literature; film; television; music

Afro-Surrealism (also Afro-surrealism, AfroSurrealism) is an artistic and cultural movement rooted in the experiences, histories, and traditions of people of African descent. This movement combines traditional surrealist imagery, magical realism, and mythology with Black identity, history, and contemporary life. Afro-Surrealism is heavily influenced by other movements such as Négritude and the Harlem Renaissance, and uses absurdity and some supernatural elements to explore the relationship between lived experiences and reality. The term Afro-Surreal was first coined by Amiri Baraka in 1974 to describe the work of Henry Dumas. In 2009, D. Scot Miller published the Afrosurreal Manifesto to further develop the concept into an artistic framework. Afro-Surrealism is practiced and embodied in music, photography, film, the visual arts, poetry, and fiction, with notable practitioners including Ted Joans, Bob Kaufman, Krista Franklin, Aimé Césaire, Suzanne Césaire, Léopold Sédar Senghor, René Ménil, Kool Keith, Terence Nance, Will Alexander, Kara Walker, Samuel R. Delany, Donald Glover and Romare Bearden.

== Historical Background ==
The intellectual and artistic foundations of Afro-Surrealism are connected to earlier Black cultural movements in Europe, the Caribbean, and the United States, most notably Négritude in Paris during the 1930s. The Négritude movement was created by emerging black Francophone intellectuals, Aimé Césaire, Léopold Senghor, and Léon-Gontran Damas when they were college students, who wanted to celebrate people of African descent and resist racism, assimilation, and colonial alienation in Europe. The movement contributed to the development of Black artistic expression and anti-colonial thought.

These earlier intellectual and artistic frameworks provide important context for the development of Afro-surrealism as a genre. The relationship between surrealist experimentation and Black artistry continued throughout the decades. In 1974, Amiri Baraka used the phrase "Afro Surreal Expressionism" to describe Henry Dumas's posthumously published collection Ark of Bones and Other Stories, describing the Dumas's ability to create fictional worlds based on real-life experiences of Black peoples. The concept later expanded due to D. Scot Miller's Afrosurreal Manifesto, which furthered developed Afro-surrealism into a broader artistic framework, incorporating contemporary films and television shows.

== The Afrosurreal Manifesto ==
In 2009, writer and cultural critic D. Scot Miller published The Afrosurreal Manifesto: Black is the New Black, A 21st-Century Manifesto in the San Francisco Bay Guardian. The manifesto outlined Afro-Surrealism as an artistic and cultural framework, distinguishing it from both European surrealism and Afrofuturism.

Based on works by Senegalese poet and philosopher Léopold Sédar Senghor, Miller distinguishes European surrealism, which he characterizes as empirical, with African surrealism, which is described as mystical and metaphorical. He suggests that Afro-Surrealism stems from the realities and lived experiences from those of the African diaspora that blurs the boundaries between the ordinary and the extraordinary.

In the Manifesto, Miller also makes a distinction between Afro-Surrealism and Afrofuturism. Afrofuturism is an artistic and intellectual genre that uses science, technology, and science-fiction to explore possibilities for Black futures. On the other hand, Afro-Surrealism is rooted in the present, or something Miller refers to as the "future-past." This concept suggests that some imagined futures, including "concentration camps, bombed-out cities, famines, and enforced sterilization" have already happened or are currently happening to Black populations around the world.

The Afrosurreal Manifesto identifies several themes and characteristics of Afro-Surrealist expression. These include, the exploration of magical or supernatural dimensions of everyday life, the incorporation of mythology and historical memory, and the distortion of reality to create an emotional impact. D. Scot Miller also emphasizes that Afro-Surrealism is not confined to a specific artistic discipline, identity, or expression. The practice Afro-Surrealism is purposefully ambiguous to support an evolving framework and diverse artistic approaches.

== Black Francophone literary productions ==
The productions of Black Francophone Caribbean writers during the 1930s and 1940s may be considered Afro-Surreal however the writers themselves identified as Surrealist.

Suzanne Césaire, a surrealist thinker and partner of Aimé Césaire, was an important figure in the history of the Afro-surreal aesthetic. Her quest for "The Marvelous" over the "miserablism" expressed in the usual arts of protest inspired the Tropiques surrealist group, and especially René Ménil. Ménil says in "Introduction to the Marvelous" (1930s):

The true task of mankind consists solely in the attempt to bring the marvelous into real life, so that life can become more encompassing. So long as the mythic imagination is not able to overcome each and every boring mediocrity, human life will amount to nothing but useless, dull experiences, just killing time, as they say.

Suzanne Césaire's proclamation, "Be in permanent readiness for The Marvelous", quickly became a credo of the movement; the word "marvelous" has since become recontextualized with regard to contemporary black arts and interventions.

In his 1956 essay for Présence Africaine, Haitian novelist Jacques Stephen Alexis wrote: "What, then, is the Marvellous, except the imagery in which a people wraps its experience, reflects its conception of the world and of life, its faith, its hope, its confidence in man, in a great justice, and the explanation which it finds for the forces antagonistic to progress?" In his work, Alexis is seen to have an acute sense of reality that is not unlike that of traditional surrealism, and his coining of the term "Marvelous Realism" reflects his influence by the earlier works of the Négritude/Black Surrealist Movement.

== Characteristics and Themes ==
Afro-Surrealism explores Black identity, the experiences of the African diaspora, and the relationship between reality and the supernatural. Afro-Surrealist works often combine common social and historical realities with fantastical, dreamlike, or absurd elements by using surrealist techniques, folklore/mythology, spirituality, and historical memory. Although there are no set ways or methods to practice Afro-Surrealism, there are several recurring themes that appear in Afro-Surrealist works including racial identity, psychological effects of oppression, and the reinterpretation of historical experiences.

=== Black Identity and Lived Experiences ===
Afro-Surrealist art frequently examines the experiences of Black people living within predominantly white societies, including the effects of racism, racial inequality, and discrimination. Rather than focusing on imagined futures, Afro-Surrealism tends to engage with contemporary social and political realities such as racial violence, police brutality, systemic discrimination and social justice movements. Afro-Surrealism delineates from surrealism in this sense because it specifically examines weird events through the lens of race. Unconventional narratives and fantastical imagery are often used to exaggerate or warp shared Black experiences to emphasize the psychological impact and absurdity of the realities of racial oppression. These techniques are used to challenge conventional representations of Black identity and explore how individual experiences can reflect larger issues within the community.

=== Mythology and Spirituality ===
Mythological or supernatural elements are frequently used in Afro-Surrealist works to blur the lines of reality. Magical or inexplicable events are used to disrupt the protagonist's otherwise normal life in order to create ambiguity between the natural and supernatural worlds. These elements can take inspiration from folklore from the African diaspora and spirituality, using them as metaphors to explore the painful truths and psychological traumas of racial oppression, and experiences that might be difficult to express through conventional realism.

In some works, the creator may attempt to offer scientific or psychological explanations for the supernatural events that occur, but won't necessarily have a definitive answer. This ambiguity in a way allows the fantastical to coexist with shared social realities. The use of supernatural occurrences can also challenge stereotypical representations of black characters such as the "Magical Negro" trope, where magic exists within that world, and black characters have mystical abilities and are used as sidekicks for white protagonists. In Afro-Surrealist narratives, extraordinary experiences sometimes instead center on black protagonists and their own lives and struggles.

=== Historical Memory ===
Afro-Surrealism often takes inspiration from the historical experiences of people of African descent, particularly the generational impacts of slavery, colonialism, racial segregation and systemic discrimination. Works may reference historical events and instances of wide-scale oppression, including slavery, Jim Crow laws, medical experimentation on Black populations, and forced sterilization. Afro-Surrealist practitioners might incorporate these references in fictional scenarios with imaginary characters and surrealist imagery to explore the psychological impacts of generational trauma within the Black community and how historical violence still influences black lives today.

== Literature ==
Early Afro-Surrealism in literature was represented almost exclusively by poetry of Léopold Senghor, Aimé Césaire, Bob Kaufman, Ted Joans, and Will Alexander. The new generation of authors includes both poets, for instance, Krista Franklin, and a galaxy of fiction writers: Nalo Hopkinson, Tananarive Due, Junot Díaz, Edwidge Danticat, Colson Whitehead, and Helen Oyeyemi.

== Examples of Afro-surrealist works ==
=== Literary Works ===
==== Boy, Snow, Bird (2014), Helen Oyeyemi ====
In Boy, Snow, Bird, Helen Oyeyemi reimagines the Snow White fairytale through themes of race, colorism, identity, and passing. In the novel, a young woman, Boy Novak, moves to a small Massachusetts town in the 1950s, marries a man named Arturo Whitman, and gives birth to a dark-skinned daughter who she names Bird, revealing to Boy that Arturo's family is black and that he has been passing as white. Oyeyemi "dramatizes the psychological tensions of the black protagonist's clash with Western notions of modernity and logic" and "examines the science behind optical illusions" through a family's mixed race connections.

==== Pym (2011), Mat Johnson ====
Inspired by Edgar Allen Poe's The Narrative of Arthur Gordon Pym of Nantucket, Pym by Mat Johnson is a satirical fantasy that explore racial identity in America and Antarctica. The novel follows a protagonist named Chris Jaynes, a professor of African-American literature who refers to himself as a "Professional Negro," as he voyages to the South Pole with an all-black crew to find a lost black civilization, but ends up discovering a prehistoric world of giant white people who enslave them. Similar to Boy, Snow, Bird, Johnson's story "produces an alternative understanding of temporality by revisiting narratives from Western canon and infuses [the story] with African-American histories, folklore, and cultural references."

==== Zong! (2008), M. Nourbese Philip and Setaey Adamu Boateng ====
In Zong!, M. Nourbese Philip crafts a counter-narrative surrounding the events of the Zong massacre. Utilizing the words from the legal decision to build her poetry, Philip rejects the idea of an archival past. Instead, Philip looks to the present moment to understand how to read this legal decision and understand the case. Following the footsteps of Morrison's Beloved, Philip presupposes the notion of a past that is not past allowing these past artifacts to haunt the present moment. Rather than organize the fragments, Philip allows the fragments to tell themselves. This is not to say that Philip gives the fragments voices, but instead gives them space. The space in the poem allows Philip's audience to hear the silence of these voices, to truly understand the missing narratives form the past and the role that has on the present.

==== Beloved (1987), Toni Morrison ====
Toni Morrison's Beloved: A Novel remains an important milestone for Afro-surrealists. Here, Morrison imagines a narrative of a formerly enslaved woman grieving the death of her baby daughter, Beloved. With no trace of a past, Beloved reappears on the steps of her mother's home, confused and looking for her mother. Following this moment, the novel crafts a haunting tale of a woman seeking to understand the sudden reappearance of her daughter and the scars left behind from slavery. In Beloved, Morrison attempts to come to grip with the legacies left by slavery, challenging the notion that these exist only in the past. From the epigraph, "Sixty Million and more", Morrison presupposes there is no way to count those affected from slavery and additionally, that the number is ever-growing into the present. In her award-winning novel, Morrison expands on the idea of the past, attempting to demonstrate the past is ever present.

==== Invisible Man (1952), Ralph Ellison ====
Ralph Ellison's Invisible Man is considered to be one of the most famous Afro-Surrealist works. The novel follows an unnamed Black narrator as he navigates American society, racism, discrimination, Marxism, and the contradictions of black identity. The narrator reflects on his life and experiences with social invisibility as a black man in America. He goes through a series of surreal and often "Kafka-like" absurd experiences, spanning from a small Southern town to Harlem, dealing with distorted perceptions of reality in a way that explores the psychological and social effects of racial oppression.

=== Television ===
==== Atlanta, Donald Glover ====
Atlanta is an American comedy-drama television series created by Donald Glover that premiered on September 6, 2016, on FX. The series centers on college dropout and music manager Earnest "Earn" Marks (played by Glover) and rapper Paper Boi (Brian Tyree Henry) as they navigate a strange, seemingly otherworldly version of the Atlanta rap scene, examining racism, whiteness, existentialism and modern African-American culture through Afro-Surrealism. It also stars LaKeith Stanfield and Zazie Beetz.

==== Random Acts of Flyness, Terence Nance ====
Random Acts of Flyness (2018–present) is a late night sketch comedy series created by American artist Terence Nance for HBO. The series uses humor to examine the absurdity of race relations in the United States throughout different sketches or vignettes. Some sketches involve police brutality, the "white savior complex," and other instances of everyday racism.

=== Film ===
==== Get Out (2017), Jordan Peele ====
Jordan Peele's directorial debut Get Out is a psychological horror film starring Daniel Kaluuya, Allison Williams, Lil Rey Howery, and LaKeith Stanfield. The plot follows a young black man, played by Kaluuya, who discovers shocking secrets when he meets the family of his white girlfriend (Williams). The film has been described as a critique of post-racial America and neoliberalism. Get Out is considered to be one of the greatest horror films of the 21st century.

==== Sorry to Bother You (2018) Boots Riley ====
Sorry to Bother You is a 2018 American surrealist, urban fantasy, science fiction, black-comedy film written and directed by Boots Riley, in his directorial debut. It stars LaKeith Stanfield, Tessa Thompson, Jermaine Fowler, Omari Hardwick, Terry Crews, Patton Oswalt, David Cross, Danny Glover, Steven Yeun, and Armie Hammer. The film follows a young black telemarketer who adopts a "white accent" to succeed at his job. Swept into a corporate conspiracy, he must choose between profit and joining his activist friends to organize labor.

==== Harriet (2019) Kasi Lemmons ====
Kasi Lemmons is a black American female film director and screenwriter who led the 2019 motion picture Harriet which showcases the life of historical figure, Harriet Tubman. In this Hollywood rendition, Tubman experiences frequent visions from divinity that guide her when initially escaping enslavement, freeing other enslaved peers via the Underground Railroad, and formulating plans as the leader of a government-sanctioned military raid. These 'divine visions' reimagine Tubman's real-life proneness to seizures due to a severe head injury from her early teenage years. The reinterpretation of a physical disability as a "superpower" exemplifies the African-American community's application of religious belief as a means of problem-solving, perseverance, and optimism amidst their institutionalized mistreatment throughout the era of U.S. Slavery.

==== They Cloned Tyrone (2023) Juel Taylor ====
They Cloned Tyrone is a 2023 American science fiction, comedy, mystery film and Juel Taylor's directorial debut. Starring John Boyega, Teyonah Parris, and Jamie Foxx, the film follows a drug dealer, one of his clients, and a sex worker as they uncover a shadow government cloning conspiracy. The movie was conceived as homage to the Blaxploitation films of the 1970s, and incorporates absurdist humor and satire with mystery, horror, and science fiction.

=== Music ===
==== Lemonade, Beyoncé Knowles-Carter ====
Beyonce's award-winning album 'Lemonade' utilizes distinct references, narratives, and imagery originating from black American culture to convey the socio-historical experiences of black women within the U.S. social milieu. Throughout the album, shifts between musical genres reflect changing public perceptions of women of the African Diaspora, while code-switching and colloquialisms in Beyonce's lyrics reflect respectability politics, a key element of racial socialization. Popular sources and scholastic platforms both utilize Lemonade in the sociological discourse about how generations of black American women have experienced misogynoir.

==== "This is America", Childish Gambino ====
"This Is America" (2018), a song and music video by Donald Glover's rapper alter-ego, Childish Gambino, directed by Hiro Murai, uses surrealist imagery, absurdism, and social satire to examine contemporary Black experiences in the United States. The music video juxtaposes upbeat rhythm and choreographed dance with sudden, graphic acts of violence and gestures of minstrelsy. Its use of historical references and symbolism has been described as "brilliant" and "genius" displays of surrealism in relation to black life in America.
