= Une Tempête =

1969 play by Aimé Césaire

- Original language: French
- Written by: Aimé Césaire

Premiere
- Date: 1969
- Place: the Festival d'Hammamet in Tunisia

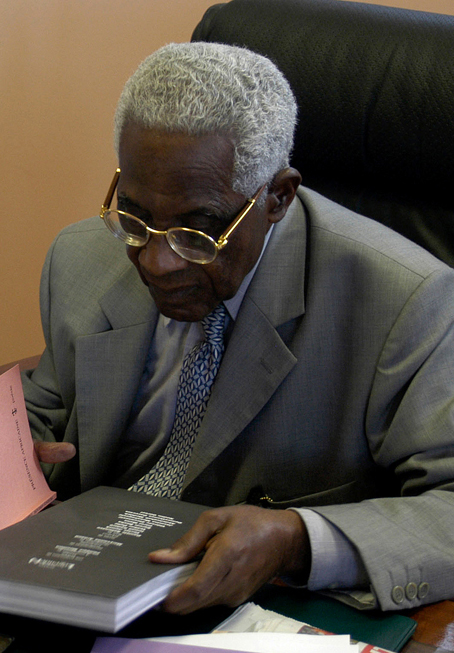
Martinican poet and politician Aimé Césaire in 2003

Une Tempête (English: "A Tempest") is a 1969 play by Aimé Césaire. It is an adaptation of Shakespeare's The Tempest from a postcolonial perspective, set on an island in the Caribbean. The play was first performed at the Festival d'Hammamet in Tunisia under the direction of Jean-Marie Serreau. It later played in Avignon and Paris. Césaire uses all of the characters from Shakespeare's version, with some additions and new renderings of the original cast.

In this version, Césaire specifies that Prospero is a white master, while Ariel is a mulatto and Caliban is a black slave. These characters are the focus of the play as Césaire emphasized issues of race, power, decolonization, and anti-imperialism.

== About the author ==
Aimé Césaire, a writer from the Caribbean island of Martinique, was born in 1913 when the island was still a French colony. He became a prominent figure in the Negritude movement, which was dedicated to opposing colonial powers' political and cultural dominance and celebrating black identity.

In his reinterpretation of Shakespeare's play, Césaire gives Caliban, often seen as a symbol of colonial oppression, a more prominent role and a powerful voice to challenge the authority of the play's colonial character, Prospero. Known for his vivid language, power, and political commentary, Césaire's works, including plays such as Une Tempête, reflect his deep involvement in the decolonization struggle and his active participation in the political challenges facing Martinique and the wider Caribbean.

== Characters ==
- Prospero - the rightful duke of Milan, powerful magician, and slave master
- Ariel - a "mulatto slave" and fairy
- Caliban - son of Sycorax and Black slave
- Miranda - Prospero's daughter
- Eshu - a Yoruba deity
- Ferdinand - the son of Alonso and Miranda's love interest
- Alonso - the King of Naples
- Antonio- the Duke of Naples and Prospero's brother
- Gonzalo - Alonso's counselor
- Trinculo - the King of Naples' jester
- Stephano - the King of Naples' butler
- Sebastian - Alonso's brother

== Synopsis ==
The action in the play closely follows that of Shakespeare's play, though Césaire emphasizes the importance of the people who inhabited the island before the arrival of Prospero and his daughter Miranda: Caliban and Ariel. Both have been enslaved by Prospero, though Caliban was the ruler of the island before Prospero's arrival.

Caliban and Ariel react differently to their situations. Caliban favors revolution over Ariel's non-violence, and rejects his name as the imposition of Prospero's colonizing language, desiring to be called X. He complains stridently about his enslavement and regrets not being powerful enough to challenge the reign of Prospero. Ariel, meanwhile, contents himself with asking Prospero to consider giving him independence.

At the end of the play, Prospero grants Ariel his freedom, but retains control of the island and of Caliban. This conclusion presents a relative contrast with Shakespeare's version, which implies that Prospero will leave the island with his daughter and the men who were shipwrecked there at the beginning of the play.

== Critical response and analyses ==
Along with much of Césaire's other work, Une Tempête is widely discussed. Some scholars, such as Ania Loomba, take issue with the idea of appropriating tales of imperialism and constructing them into anti-imperialist pieces. She comments that this style of response is potentially inhibitory to progress.

Her main point is that changing the narrative not only reduces the relative legitimacy of the non-European world, but weakens the response by the sheer need to use such source material. She goes so far as to imply that the need to engage with the original text also implies that there is some aspect of truthfulness in that work, and almost affirms Eurocentric ideology.

Other scholars, like Russell West, approve the method of speaking directly back to the source material. West believes the play has a specific focus on assimilation and that the play grapples with the concept in a compelling way. He also sees the value in assessing the work critically, and agrees with Loomba's initial skepticism, but essentially comes to the aforementioned conclusion about assimilation.

There are nonetheless many who agree with Loomba, famously including Maryse Condé, who even go as far as to say the creation of a movement like Négritude, which this work would fall under, legitimizes many of the problematic ideas that colonialism itself created. She laments that the need to facilitate an explicitly Black cultural movement really just affirms Western ideologies and prevents larger scale progress.

== Historical context ==
Une Tempête is seen as an extension of the intellectual trend known as "Négritude" which originated in France during the 1930s. It came into existence at a time when numerous individuals of African lineage resided in French territories, enduring the ramifications of colonialism, which frequently led to the repression and obliteration of their cultural roots. The term "Négritude" was first introduced by Aimé Césaire in his work Cahier d'un retour au pays natal (Notebook of a Return to the Native Land, 1939), where he defined it as the acknowledgment and embrace of one's blackness, along with a profound appreciation of black history and culture.

From its very beginning, Négritude was a global initiative, seeking to glorify black culture and identity, while confronting Western ideologies that had been employed to rationalize colonialism and enslavement. It took cues from the cultural rebirth of African Americans during the Harlem Renaissance and carved its own niche in the French literary world. The movement, which sprouted in the 1930s, was not solely headed by Césaire. Other thought leaders like Léopold Sédar Senghor, and Léon-Gontran Damas played significant roles.

Une Tempête, a work filled with themes of colonization, subjugation, and defiance against unfair power structures, is viewed as an extension of this movement. It dares to challenge the prevalent Western interpretation of Shakespeare's "The Tempest" and provides a fresh viewpoint on the aftermath of colonialism in the Caribbean. The narrative employs a blend of Creole and French, highlighting the intricacies of cultural identity in the Caribbean, all while reinforcing and honoring black culture.

== Influences ==
Death of a Salesman (1949) by Arthur Miller is directly referenced. The original French of Une Tempête reads, "l’orange pressée, on en rejette l’écorce," which Richard Miller translated to, "Once you've squeezed the juice from the orange, you toss the rind away!". These exclamations by Caliban to Prospero are a nod to the quote from Death of a Salesman where Willy exclaims, "You can't eat the orange and throw the peel away— a man is not a piece of fruit!".

== Bibliography ==
- Césaire, Aimé (1969). Une tempête [A Tempest]. Collection Théâtre, 22 (in French). Paris, France: Éditions du Seuil. ISBN 9782020314312. OCLC 9435845.
