= Yoyotte =

Yoyotte is a surname. Notable people with the surname include:

- Jean Yoyotte (1927–2009), French Egyptologist
- Marie-Josèphe Yoyotte (1929–2017), French film and television editor and actress
- Simone Yoyotte (c. 1910–1933), Martinican poet and intellectual
