= Buata Malela =

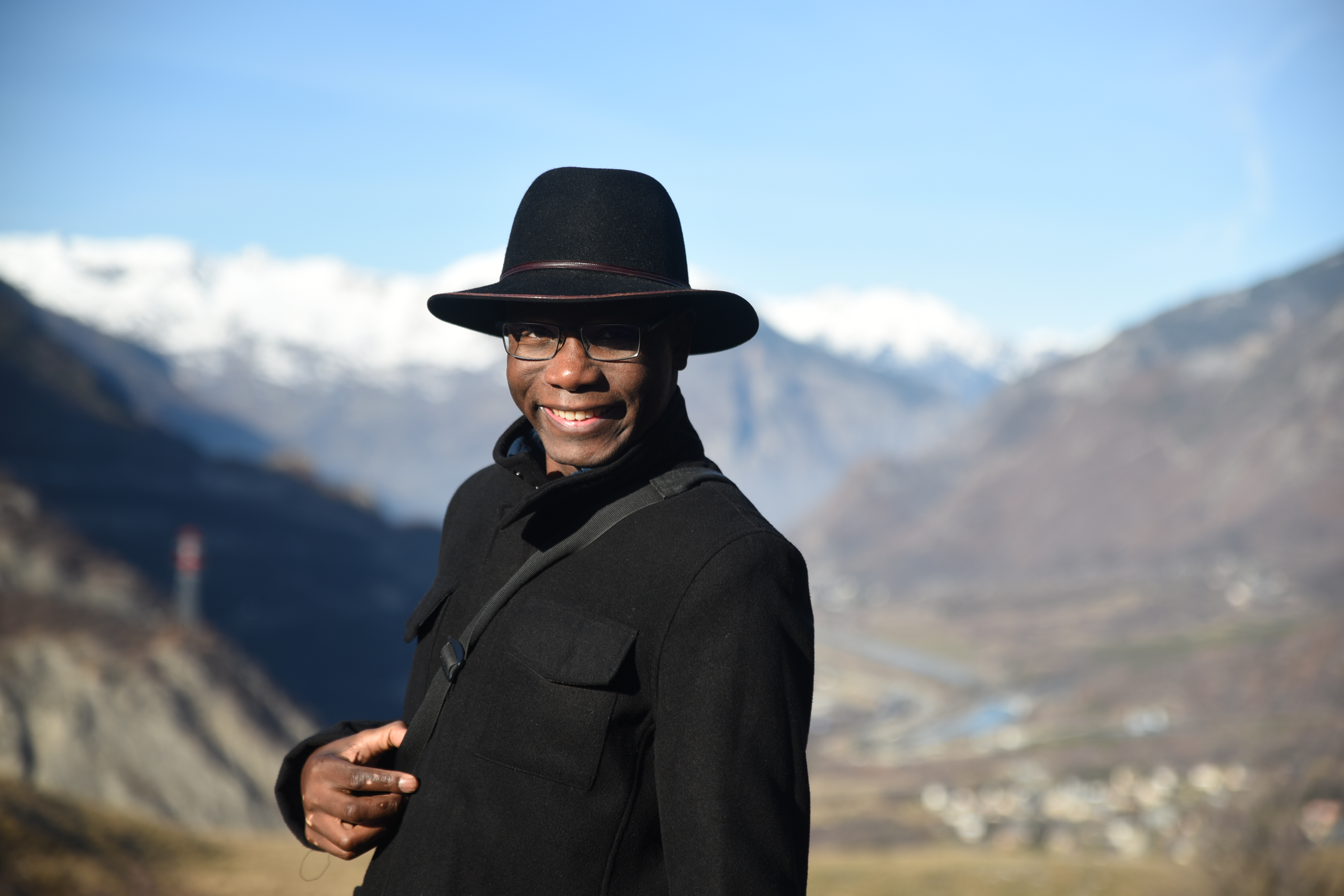
Buata Malela

Buata Bundu Malela is a specialist in comparative literature and historian of the intellectuals of the Afro-West-Indian diaspora. He was born in Kinshasa, Zaire (now Democratic Republic of the Congo) in 1979 to Congolese and Senegalese parents.

He completed his studies in Belgium and in France, receiving a doctor of philosophy and letters degree from the Université libre de Bruxelles in Brussels and the Université Paul Verlaine - Metz in France. He is specialized in the questions relating to the postcolonial studies, with the sociology of the Francophone literatures of Africa and of the Caribbean, with the accounts of slaves from France, the United Kingdom and the United States, with the migrant literatures, like with the relations between philosophy (African and Western) and literature of originating in Africa and in the Caribbean.

Moreover, Buata B. Malela is interested in the matters touching with cultural diversity, the postcolonialism and the relations between literature and cultural universalization. Author of many studies on the Afro-West-Indian intellectuals (such as René Maran, Léon Damas, Aimé Césaire, Édouard Glissant, Simone Schwarz-Bart, Léopold Sédar Senghor) and of hexagonal France (in particular Jean-Paul Sartre, Jacques Derrida, Gilles Deleuze, etc.), he published a book on Afro-West-Indian writers in their relation with the Parisian intellectual world of the colonial era.

He was a researcher at University of Silesia (Katowice, Poland) and now he is Associate Professor of French and Francophone studies at Centre Universitaire de Mayotte.

== Bibliography ==
Books

- Buata B. MALELA, Les écrivains afro-antillais à Paris (1920-1960): stratégies et postures identitaires, Paris, Karthala, coll. Lettres du Sud, 2008, 476p.
- Buata B. MALELA, Aimé Césaire. Le fil et la trame: critique et figuration de la colonialité du pouvoir, Paris, Anibwe, 2009.
- Buata B. MALELA, Michael Jackson. Le visage, la musique et la danse : Anamnèse d’une trajectoire afro-américaine, Paris, Anibwe, 2e edit. 2014, 150p.
- Buata B. Malela, Rémi Tchokothe & Linda Rasoamanana (dir.), Les Littératures francophones de l’archipel des Comores, Paris, Classiques Garnier, 2017, 428p. (ISBN 978-2-406-06238-7)
- Buata B. Malela, Simona Jisa & Sergiu Miscoiu (dir.), Littérature et politique en Afrique. Approche transdisciplinaire, Paris, éditions du Cerf, coll. Patrimoines, 2018, 368p. (ISBN 9782204126823)
- Buata B. Malela, Andrzej Rabsztyn et Linda Rasoamanana (dir.), Les représentations sociales des îles dans les discours littéraires francophones, Paris, éditions du Cerf, coll. Cerf Patrimoines, 2018, 368p. (ISBN 978-2-204-12911-4)
- Buata B. Malela et Alexander Dickow (dir.), Albert Camus, Aimé Césaire. Poétiques de la révolte, Paris, éditions Hermann, 2018, 366p. (ISBN 9782705697501)
- Buata B. Malela, Aimé Césaire et la relecture de la colonialité du pouvoir avec Sartre, Fanon, Glissant, Kourouma, Badian, Schwarz-Bart, Dadié et Ouologuem, préface de Jean Bessière, Paris, Anibwe, coll. Liziba, 2019, 320p (ISBN 978-2-916121-96-3)
