= Christian Filostrat =

American diplomat

Christian Filostrat (born 1945) is a senior American diplomat and a National War College alumnus. He grew up in the Bronx, New York, and has a PhD in international affairs. A writer, author of The Secret of the African Dictator, The Gospel of Thomas, and Jerome's Pillows. The Beggars’ Pursuit is a novel about relations between the United States and Zaire’s Mobutu Sese Seko. Frantz Fanon in the United States is based on discussions Filostrat held with Fanon’s wife, Josie Fanon. The book concludes with comments from Mrs. Fanon about her husband. WOKE - The road to enlightenment that a United States Foreign Service Officer takes. During 1990 – 1991 Filostrat attended the National War College, Washington, D.C.

== Career ==
A Négritude specialist, Filostrat researches in the fields of politics and literature in the French-speaking Caribbean and the oral tradition and literature of Africa. Filostrat assesses in what manner European colonialism upended the civilizations of Africa and affected the people’s lives. He examines the disadvantages imposed on Africa by male-dominated societies and indicates that improvement will not be discernible until African women achieve a modicum of equality.

He is widely known for his Négritude and Its Revolution, having collaborated with the Négritude founders, Léon Damas, Léopold Sédar Senghor, and Aimé Césaire to document their works and thoughts. In The Beggars’ Pursuit he retells their personal lives in Paris circa 1935, their foundation of the Negritude movement, and their activities at the time of the creation of L’Etudiant Noir, the publication in which Négritude saw first light. He was Damas's sounding board while Damas was composing his last collection of poems, Mine de Riens. Filostrat organized Damas’s funeral in Washington, D.C., and carried the ashes to Martinique for the eulogy by Aimé Césaire.

Filostrat is the author of Racial Consciousness and the Social Revolution of Aimé Césaire and at the request of President Senghor lectured on the subject at the University of the Mutants on Gorée island in Senegal in 1980. In Negritude Agonistes, Filostrat introduces issue No. 3 (May–June 1935) of L'Etudiant Noir, Journal Mensuel de l'Association des Étudiants Martiniquais en France (The Black Student, Monthly Journal of the Martiniquan Student Association in France), in which Aimé Césaire coined the expression and defined the concept of Négritude. Christopher l. Miller, Frederick Clifford Ford Professor of African American Studies and French at Yale University, said: "In 2008 Christian Filostrat published a book that contains negritude’s missing link: an article by Césaire in L’étudiant noir, number 3, May–June 1935."

== Bibliography ==
- The Beggars' Pursuit, 2007 (ISBN 0977090477)
- Negritude Agonistes, 2008 (ISBN 0981893929)
- The Gospel of Thomas, 2011 (ISBN 0983115125)
- Jerome's Pillows, 2015 (ISBN 193762272X)
- The Secret of the African Dictator, 2022 (ISBN 0692614028)
- Frantz Fanon in the United States 2021 (ISBN B09NS4SMJ8)
- WOKE 2023 (ASIN: B0CMZV9BDH)
