= Tropiques =

Martiniquan literary journal (1941–1945)

- Categories: Literary magazine
- Frequency: Quarterly
- Publisher: Aimé Césaire, Suzanne Césaire, René Ménil
- First issue: 1941
- Final issue: 1945
- Language: French

Tropiques was a quarterly literary magazine published in Martinique from 1941 to 1945. It was founded by Aimé Césaire, Suzanne Césaire, and other Martinican intellectuals of the era, who contributed poetry, essays, and fiction to the magazine. While resisting the Vichy-supported government that ruled Martinique at the time, the writers commented on colonialism, surrealism, and other topics. André Breton, the French leader of surrealism, contributed to the magazine and helped turn it into a leading voice of surrealism in the Caribbean.

== Origins ==
Aimé Césaire wrote in the first issue of Tropiques that he had formed the magazine in reaction to the problems of the time and the lack of art coming out of Martinique and other parts of the Caribbean. Césaire would go on to be the leading contributor to the magazine, and each issue included at least one of his pieces. He set the focus on the need to create a distinct Martinican culture with the first words of the introduction for the journal's first issue:

"Sterile and silent land. It is of ours that I am speaking."

The first issue was published in Fort-de-France, Martinique's capital, in April 1941, with contributions by Aimé and Suzanne Césaire, René Ménil, Charles Péguy, and Georgette Anderson. It cost 12 francs for a single issue, or 40 francs for a yearlong subscription.

The magazine included poetry, fiction, essays, and commentary from a range of authors in Martinique at the time. Ménil and the Césaires would write and solicit pieces after their jobs as schoolteachers at the famed Lycée Schoelcher in Fort-de-France.

== Negritude ==
Césaire used his leadership position in the magazine to advance the philosophy of Negritude. Césaire has been cited by scholars such as Arnold James as one of the most influential theorists of the movement, and he started writing about it in earnest in the years shortly before and during Tropiques. He wrote that black people, in Africa and the African diaspora, should reject the norms that influenced them to try to follow French and other European intellectual traditions.

Scholars have argued that there was not a distinct and significant black Martinican literary tradition before Tropiques. Frantz Fanon said that Césaire's ideas, especially leaving Europe to create a uniquely African or diasporic African intellectual tradition, had a profound influence on his own later writings. Like Fanon, Césaire's experiences during the war led him to the belief that French colonialism was associated with many of the same dehumanizing evils as the autocratic regimes spreading across Europe.

After the Free French took over Martinique from the Vichy, Césaire continued to write against European colonialism. According to Janis L. Pallister, although Césaire wrote against the systems of colonialism that the French had on the island before and during the war, he opposed independence for the French territories in the Caribbean, and he was elected to France's National Assembly after the war ended. Part of the Negritude philosophy of the magazine involved a commitment to leftist thought, even though Césaire would personally leave the French Communist Party a little more than a decade later over worries that it was not committed to a distinct Martinican or Antillean culture.

== Surrealism ==
Many of the major contributors to Tropiques were proponents of surrealist writing, and the magazine was the most prominent example of the movement in the Caribbean at the time. The various writers in Tropiques were influenced by surrealism in different ways: whereas Aimé Césaire mostly used it as a poetic device, René Ménil and others adopted its larger philosophical positions in their political writing.

Ménil, who had been exposed to and endorsed surrealism during the early 1930s as a student in Paris, combined a surrealist attitude with Négritude in many of his pieces, including his writing about the need for art in Martinique that comes from distinctly Martinican experiences and traditions. Ménil wrote that he could avoid reality and establishment theories while using his imagination, as a poet to find a new mode of thought that was still based in the world around him. Surrealism allowed for such "primitivism," the promotion of art that drew primarily from uniquely African or Caribbean influences, instead of European styles. In this sense, to allow "Martinique to refocus" and "to lead Martinicans to reflect" on their close environment, Césaire offers Henri Stehlé, Director of the Botanical Garden of Fort-de-France, to write two articles for Tropiques concerning the Martinican flora, and the stories and legends related to the common names of plants used by people (Tropiques N° 2 of 1941 and N° 10 of 1944). According to Ursula K. Heise, these articles and "the Caesarean invocations to the Antillean ecology operates as indices of a racial and cultural authenticity which is distinguished from European identity...."

André Breton, one of the fathers of surrealism in Europe, was living in Martinique during the war, and he was in contact with the writers of Tropiques after he saw the first issue in a store. Surrealists in Europe supported Tropiques, in part because Breton heard of Césaire and his magazine in Martinique. The fact that the magazine was written outside of Europe gave it more authenticity in Breton's eyes. Breton's visit to Martinique had a large influence on the surrealism present in many of the magazine's later issues—the philosophy of Tropiques was primarily about Negritude and uplifting Martinican culture, and surrealism served as a useful poetic device and theoretical lens for developing these ideas.

== Influence of Suzanne Césaire ==
Scholars such as Kara Rabbitt have stated that unlike many literary trends of the time, women played a leading role in Tropiques. Suzanne Césaire, in particular, was essential to the magazine as an editor and a writer—she wrote seven pieces in the magazine's 14 issues. Topics included Leo Frobenius, André Breton, and surrealism. She would almost never write again (just one play was published before her death in 1966). One prominent novelist, Maryse Condé, named Suzanne Césaire as the most important influence behind the political ideologies of the magazine. Suzanne Césaire was the first of the writers in her circle (even before her husband) to challenge communism and Breton's surrealism as too grounded in European ideals and not being committed enough to an independent Antillean culture and intellectual tradition.

In her final essay in Tropiques, "Le Grand Camouflage," Suzanne Césaire wrote about the changes that the West Indies had caused on the French sense of nationhood and identity, a reversal of the usual view of colonialism as just being one country imposing its values on another. She concluded that the white French majority was unwilling to see these changes: "They dare not recognize themselves in this ambiguous being, the West Indian man ... They did not expect this strange budding of their blood."

== Resistance to Vichy government ==
Martinique was controlled by France's Nazi-affiliated Vichy government until mid-1943, and the island authorities attempted to shut down the magazine soon before Martinique was taken by the Free French.

Lieutenant de vaisseau Bayle, the Chief of Information Services for the island's government, wrote that Tropiques was no longer eligible to get paper to print on (paper was in short supply during the war, so it was being rationed, and denying a periodical its paper supply could effectively silence it). Bayle wrote that he had "very formal objections to a revolutionary, radical, and sectarian review," so Tropiques could not publish a new issue.

Aimé Césaire, Suzanne Césaire, Georges Gratiant, Aristide Maugée, René Ménil, and Lucie Thésée signed the response, in which they denounced the Vichy government's racism and noted great French writers who had claimed the negative qualities Bayle had tagged them with:

"Racists," yes. Racism like that of Toussaint-Louverture, Claude McKay, and Langston Hughes—against the racism like that of Drumont and Hitler.

Tropiques was unable to publish until the Free French came to power in Martinique a few months later. The next publication was a double issue, to make up for the issue that was censored.

René Ménil later wrote that even when the Vichy government allowed Tropiques to be published, the authors had to censor themselves. Informed readers, many of whom were in the same Martinican literary circles as the writers, knew to go beyond what the articles and essays directly said in interpreting the political messages. The creation of the magazine, by a group of intellectuals after the Vichy-affiliated regime took power and started to suppress freedoms, was itself seen as a protest by some.

At times, though, the opposition to the Vichy-affiliated government came to the surface. In an example of this, Dominique Berthet cited that Breton wrote in honor of Jules Monnerot, an early leader in Martinique's communist movement, shortly after Monnerot's death, and he wrote that "in truth a man is only great for the greatness of what he refuses."
