= Paulette Nardal =

French writer (1896–1985)

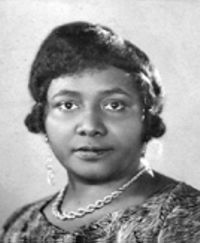
- Born: 12 October 1896; Le François, Martinique
- Died: 16 February 1985 (aged 88); Fort-de-France, Martinique, France
- Occupations: Writer, journalist, activist
- Known for: First black person to study at the Sorbonne

Paulette Nardal (12 October 1896 – 16 February 1985) was a French writer from Martinique, a journalist, and one of the drivers of the development of black literary consciousness. She was one of the authors involved in the creation of the Négritude genre and introduced French intellectuals to the works of members of the Harlem Renaissance through her translations.

Born into the upper-middle class on Martinique, Nardal became a teacher and went to complete her education in Paris. She was the first black person to study at the Sorbonne in 1920 and with her sisters established an influential literary salon, Le Salon de Clamart, which explored the experiences of the African diaspora. As a journalist and author, she published works that advocated a Pan-African awareness and acknowledged the similarities of challenges faced by people due to racism and sexism. Though an ardent feminist, she was not radical, encouraging women to work within the existing social structures to achieve political influence.

At the beginning of World War II, Nardal fled France but was injured when a submarine attacked her ship, causing a lifelong disability. Returning to Martinique, she established feminist organizations and newspapers encouraging educated women to channel their energies into social improvement. She sponsored home economic training and founded nursery schools for impoverished women. Because of her understanding of issues facing the populations of the Caribbean, she was hired to work as an area specialist at the United Nations. Nardal was the first black woman to hold an official post in the Division of Non-Self-Governing Territories at the UN.

When she returned to Martinique after her UN position, she worked to preserve the musical traditions of the country. She wrote a history of traditional music styles for the centennial celebration of the abolition of slavery on the island and developed a choir that celebrated the African roots of the music of Martinique.

In the post-World War II period, Nardal was nominated as a delegate to the United Nations in 1946. She worked in the Division of Non-Self Governing Territories. She returned to Martinique in 1948, and in the 1950s and 1960s, she supported Dr. Martin Luther King’s campaign for civil rights in the United States. Nardal, who never married, died in Fort-de-France, Martinique on February 16, 1985. She was 88.

== Biography ==
=== Early life ===
Paulette Nardal was born on 12 October 1896 in Le François, Martinique, to Louise (née Achille) and Paul Nardal. Her father was a construction engineer, who had been trained in France and her mother was a piano teacher. She was the eldest of seven sisters in the family (Jeanne Nardal, Lucy Nardal, Andrée Nardal, Alice Naral, Cécile Nardal, and Emilie Nardal), which was a part of the island's small upper-middle-class black community. She attended school at the Colonial College for Girls and studied English in the West Indies. After graduating from high school, Nardal became a teacher but decided to continue her education in Paris.

=== French years ===
At the age of 24, Nardal enrolled at the Sorbonne to study English, the first black person to attend the university. She quickly became involved in the artistic circle of the French intelligentsia, coming under the influence of the Harlem Renaissance writers. Hosting a salon, with her sisters Jane and Andrée, Nardal brought together black intellectuals from Africa, the Caribbean, and the United States to discuss their experiences of being black and being part of the diaspora.

After completing her studies in Paris, Nardal briefly returned to teaching in Martinique but within a year was back in Paris, where she began working as a journalist. Her writing included literary works, critiques, journalism, discourses on colonialism, and a tourist guide called Guide des Colonies Françaises that was commissioned by the governments of the islands of the French Antilles. In October 1931, she founded a journal called La Revue du Monde Noir (Review of the Black World) with her sisters; Louis Jean Finot, a French novelist; Léo Sajous, a Haitian scholar; and Clara W. Shepard, an African-American teacher and translator. Nardal's roles included contributing to the journal, serving as editor and translator, as well as moving the journal toward a more Pan-African audience. Six issues of La Revue du monde noir were published before the journal stopped production in April 1932.

After the conclusion of the journal, Nardal began working as the secretary of Galandou Diouf, Senegalese deputy in the French National Assembly. She was actively involved in the demonstrations that followed the 1935 Italian invasion of Ethiopia, and went to Senegal in 1937 to try to rally others to the cause against the invasion. She was also active with feminist organizations including Ad Lucem Per Caritatem and the Union Féminine Civique et Sociale throughout the 1930s. When forced to flee France in 1939 because of World War II, Nardal boarded a ship flying under protection of the Red Cross. When the ship was torpedoed off the English coast, Nardal fractured both of her knees jumping into a lifeboat, and had to be hospitalized in England. She never fully recovered from her injuries.

=== Return to Martinique ===
Upon recuperating sufficiently to travel, Nardal returned to Martinique. She settled in Fort-de-France and initially worked as an English teacher for dissidents wanting to support General de Gaulle. Because Caribbean recruits were trained in the British West Indies, it was imperative that they learn English before they could receive military training. When the war ended, she worked towards social improvement and suffrage. In 1944 Nardal founded Le Rassemblement féminin to encourage women to take part in the 1945 election and in 1945, she founded a journal, La Femme dans la Cite (Woman in the City), where she stressed the importance of women's involvement in politics and social work.

In 1946, Nardal was nominated to serve as a delegate to the United Nations (UN). She arrived in New York City, where she served as an area specialist. She was the first black woman to hold an official post in the Division of Non-Self-Governing Territories, serving for 18 months. Returning to Martinique in 1948, Nardal, with help from her sister Alice, prepared a history on Martinique's musical heritage as her contribution to the celebrations surrounding the centenary of the abolition of slavery on the island. Because the traditional music, bèlè and ladjia, were giving way to jazz, Nardal wanted to improve education addressing the musical traditions. She later founded a choir to promote and preserve African-rooted traditional music including folk songs, spirituals, classical and South American songs. She continued to publish La Femme dans la Cite until 1951.

Nardal died on 16 February 1985, in Martinique. Posthumously, Jil Servant made a biographical movie in conjunction with France-Antilles T.V. in 2004 titled, Paulette Nardal, la fierté d'être négresse (Paulette Nardal, proud to be a black woman), about Nardal's life. In 2009, a collection of her essays that had been printed in La Femme dans la Cite was translated and published by T. Denean Sharpley-Whiting.

== Career in journalism ==
During her career in journalism Nardal wrote for a number of publications including, France-Outremer, Le Cri des Nègres, Le Soir and La Dépêche africaine and later L'Étudiant noir. Her connection with La Dépêche africaine is notable because although there were many journals that discussed race matters, La Dépêche africaine was the first to incorporate sex matters and women's perspectives. Nardal's works in La Dépêche africaine in the early years of her career were often cultural reviews which she would use to display black artists and black culture. She also sought to offer perspective on what it was like to live in Paris as a black person from Martinique.

Her published writings from this period include "En Exile" (In Exile) (1929) and "Une femme sculpteur noir" (A Black Woman Sculptor) (1930). "En Exile" is a short story about an exiled Caribbean woman's life in France. Through the main character, Nardal explores how for many black women, living in France was an isolating experience. "Une femme sculpteur noir" is a piece about the American sculptor Augusta Savage. In this article Nardal both celebrates Savage's accomplishments and cultural contributions, and discussed the barriers Savage faced as a black woman. Nardal wrote significantly about her consciousness of race and black solidarity, as well as the double standard of marginalizing women.

Nardal also founded two journals during her career, La Revue du Monde Noir and La Femme dans la Cité.

=== La Revue du Monde Noir (1931–1932) ===
La Revue du Monde Noir was a space where black artists and intellectuals could publish their works and make connections with other black people. The paper encouraged international solidarity between black people and incorporated black art, culture, and debate from all over the world. La Revue du Monde Noir was presented as an apolitical publication that convinced the Ministry of Colonies to offer partial funding however, " the very act of founding a bilingual, international, and multiracial review in 1930s Paris was provocative," so the paper did not entirely avoid political commentary. The paper quickly lost funding and only six issues of La Revue du Monde Noir were published before the journal stopped production in April 1932.

=== La Femme dans la Cité (1945–1951) ===
Nardal founded La Femme dans la Cité to coax middle-class readers into making the connection between improving the mind through industry and awakening their social consciousness. The journal was the only newspaper in the area and Nardal used it to try to get women out to vote in the 1945 elections. The communists won a majority of seats and, the following year, Nardal wrote several editorials stressing to women the importance of gaining an understanding of world issues and voting. Her politics were conservative right center and while she supported women's equality, she was not militant. She was aware of inequality and wanted women to educate themselves to improve their situation, but she was not in favor of overthrowing existing regimes. Nardal explained in her essays that women's political and social action was the key to social improvement and that through taking part in politics, women could combat the patriarchy.

== The Clamart Salon ==
While living in Paris Nardal and her sisters created a literary salon where people of all genders, races, and religions would gather to discuss local and international black politics, culture, and art. These discussions focused on international black solidarity and celebrated racial difference which led to the development and spread of a black racial consciousness. The Clamart Salon hosted a number of well known black intellectuals including figures from the Harlem Renaissance and the three men known for founding the Négritude movement, Aimé Césaire, Léon Gontran Damas, and Léopold Sédar Sénghor.

=== Contributions to Négritude ===
Although Paulette Nardal has not always been credited for her contributions to the Négritude movement, she held a key role in influencing the men who founded the Négritude movement. While the term Négritude did not exist before 1935, Nardal's work prior to this already reflected and encouraged the international black solidarity and pride that Négritude encouraged. Her work in La Dépêche Africaine and La Revue du Monde Noir, as well as the discussions that took place in the Clamart Salon inspired the three Négritude founders to create the paper l'Étudiant Noir, where they first used the term Négritude.

Nardal's essay in the final issue of La Revue du Monde Noir was titled "Eveil de la conscience de race" (The Awakening of Race Consciousness) and evaluated the progression of Caribbean intellectuals' racial awareness. Both the later leaders of the Négritude movement and the group called Légitime Défense, made of up Afro-Caribbean radical surrealists and communists, were significantly influenced in their ideas by this essay, in which Nardal makes a case for African pride and acknowledgement of the shared history of slavery. Nardal's view of pride did not advocate giving up one's French identity, or ending French rule in the colonies, but instead favored a middle-ground, embracing both Afro-Caribbean and French cultures. Both Mamadou Badiane and Shireen K. Lewis argue that Nardal's reflections on race began nearly a decade before Césaire and Senghor were credited with founding the philosophy of Négritude, concluding that women were both the movement's founders and its inspiration. Senghor acknowledged Nardal's involvement in founding the "New Negro Movement" in a speech delivered at Howard University in 1966.

The Clamart Salon and La Revue du Monde Noir along with Paulette Nardal's translations of Harlem Renaissance writer's works also allowed the founders of Négritude to meet with figures from the Harlem Renaissance whose work influenced and inspired the creation of Négritude.

== Feminist contributions ==
=== Feminist organizations ===
After having returned to Martinique, Nardal began implementing the ideas of industrial education, teaching women home economics to lift them out of poverty. She also implemented nursery schools to educate the children of working mothers. She worked towards suffrage and, when women gained the right to vote in 1944, urged women to take up the political mantle and work towards resolving social problems.

==== Le Rassemblement féminin ====
In 1944 Nardal founded Le Rassemblement féminin. Le Rassemblement féminin was one of two feminist organizations in Martinique at the time whose goals were to increase the number of women who voted in the 1945 elections. Le Rassemblement féminin was not an organization that supported any particular political party and in her first essay for the journal La Femme dans la Cité, Nardal emphasized that the organization's goals could apply to any political party as Le Rassemblement féminin was only meant to encourage women to become more socially and politically involved.

The other organization, l'Union des femmes de la Martinique, had mostly working-class members, many of whom had ties with communists. The women in this group had more radical feminist views than Nardal. Nardal felt that the negativity l'Union des femmes de la Martinique directed towards upper-class white women promoted racial hate, while Le Rassemblement féminin encouraged women of all backgrounds to uplift one another through solidarity.

=== Transnational feminism ===
Although primarily focused on international black solidarity and race during her time in Paris, Nardal shifted her focus to women's issues after she returned to Martinique. Despite the shift from race to gender, Nardal continued to encourage an international perspective on political and social matters. Her transnational feminist perspectives lead her to connect with women's organizations from different countries and engage in discussions of women's rights from a global perspective. Nardal believed that it was important for women to engage in both local and international politics and social work and she felt that the failure to inform students of global issues was a fundamental flaw in French curriculum. She felt that the United Nations was an important establishment that schools could use to teach international issues.

==== Work in the United Nations ====
From 1946 to 1948 Nardal acted as a delegate to the United Nations, working with both the UN Department for Non-Autonomous Territories and the UN Commission on the Status of Women. The UN Commission on the Status of Women was particularly aligned with Nardal's beliefs because its purpose was to ensure that women's rights were respected globally. Her work with the UN furthered her goals towards international social work and feminism because it allowed her to work with and learn from delegates from different countries.

=== Feminism and religion ===
Nardal was Catholic and her Christian values were often reflected in her feminist beliefs. She believed that women's difference from men was due to their feminine essence that was given to them by God. She felt that women's natural peaceful and calming nature would make them important guiding figures in social and political matters. Nardal's Catholicism is also present in the essays she wrote for La Femme dans la Cité. In her essay "Les femmes martiniquaises et l'action sociale," she calls for the women of Martinique to engage with social issues. As many Martinican women were Catholic, Nardal wrote that Christian humanism was an important part of Martinican culture and so it was the women of Martinique's duty to take social action. In her essay Nations Unies, Nardal expands her religious analysis to discuss the United Nations. In this short essay, she claims that she sees "the mystical Body of Christ actualized" in the United Nations charter, and that the UN's work reflects God's will.

Despite Paulette Nardal's Catholic beliefs, neither Le Rassemblement féminin nor La Femme dans la Cité were Catholic. Nardal presented both as non-denominational and maintained that these organizations accepted people from non-Catholic religions and non-believers.

== Tributes ==
At the 2024 Summer Olympics opening ceremony Nardal was celebrated as one of the ten "Heroines of French History".
