= Antillanité =

Literary and political movement developed in the 1960s

Antillanité is a literary and political movement developed in the 1960s that stresses the creation of a specific West Indian identity out of a multiplicity of ethnic and cultural elements.

== Background ==
From the early 1960s, a new way of envisaging French West Indian identity began to be articulated by a number of Martinican thinkers, which, in contrast to Négritude's stress on the retention of African cultural forms in the Caribbean, dwelt rather on the creation, out of a multiplicity of constituent elements, of a specifically West Indian cultural configuration to which, in time, the name "Antillanité" came to be given.

It seems to have been René Ménil, a former collaborator of Aimé Césaire, one of the principal champions of the Négritude movement, who, in an article entitled "Problèmes d'une culture antillaise" first clearly formulated the idea of a West Indian specificity (spécificité antillaise) that would enjoy such success in the years that followed.

French West Indian culture, according to Ménil, is: "neither African nor Chinese, nor Indian, nor even French, but ultimately West Indian. Our culture is West Indian since, in the course of history, it has brought together and combined in an original syncretism all these elements derived from the four corners of the earth, without being any one of those elements in particular."

== Theoretical principles ==
Originally intended as a counter to the doctrine of Négritude, and its stress on an African rather than Caribbean identity, Antillanité was positively received by a number of prominent Martinican intellectuals, in particular the Groupe de Recherches de l'Institut Martiniquais d'Etudes headed by Édouard Glissant, which published the results of its discussions on Caribbean identity in the short-lived journal Acoma (1971–73).

Like its predecessor, Négritude, Antillanité is, at its base, an assertion of the difference in the face of the encroachments of the same. The whole of Glissant's theoretical work may be seen as a sustained polemic, conducted in the name of "le Divers," (the different) against the claims of the universal, to which a succession of derogatory epithets are attached in a more or less routine fashion.

For Glissant, "the preoccupation with the universal is the alienated reverse side of the uniquely western pretension to exercise universal control", and it therefore follows that proponents of Antillanité must adopt a "firm opposition to any ideology of universal culture." Where Antillanité differs most markedly from Négritude is in its conception of the constitution of the different. For Négritude, the different was monolithic, being essentially African in character; however, in the view of Glissant, the different is, itself, diverse, complex, and heterogeneous, made up of a multiplicity of relations held in place by a complex process of attraction and repulsion. Thus, it could be said that while Négritude looked inwards, to African heritage, for its models and values Antillanité looked both inwards, and outwards, towards the Caribbean and Meso-America as a whole, in its quest for self-invention from which proponents conceived identity as an archipelago of signifiers, none of which enjoys primacy over the others and whose unity lies not in the fact of possessing a single source but, rather, in the complex amalgamation of these myriad forces which hold themselves in relation to each other. One of the major advances made by Antillanité is that it has, in large measure, shed the regressive, matricentric orientation common to both assimilationism and Négritude.

== See also ==
- Créolité
- Suzanne Césaire

== Bibliography ==
- Guy Numa, Antillanité, Paris, Azur communications, 2005, 288 p.
