= Suzanne Césaire =

Martinican writer, teacher, activist and Surrealist (1915–1966)

Suzanne Césaire (/seɪˈzɛər/; French: [sezɛʁ]; née Roussi; 11 August 1915 – 16 May 1966) was a French writer, teacher, scholar, anti-colonial and feminist activist, and Surrealist. She co-founded the Martinique cultural journal Tropiques, of which she was also an editor, along with her husband, Aimé Césaire, and René Ménil, both of whom were notable French poets from Martinique. She died in 1966 at the age of 50 from brain cancer.

== Early life ==
Césaire (née Roussi) was born in Poterie des Trois-Ilets on 11 August 1915 to Flore Roussi (née William), a school teacher, and Benoït Roussi, a sugar factory worker.

She began her education at her local primary school in Rivière-Salée in Martinique (which still had the status of a French colonial territory at that time), before attending a girls' boarding-school in the capital, Fort-de-France. Having completed her secondary education, she went to study literature in Toulouse and then in Paris at the prestigious École normale supérieure from 1936-1938.

== University and marriage to Aimé Césaire ==
In 1933, Suzanne Roussi traveled to Toulouse for her first year of preparatory school and in 1934, she moved to Paris to continue her studies. There, she met Léopold Sédar Senghor, who introduced her to Aimé Césaire in 1936. On July 10, 1937, Suzanne and Aimé Césaire married at the town hall of the 14th arrondissement in Paris. During their studies, the Césaires were both part of the editorial team of the militant journal L'Étudiant noir. In 1938, the couple had their first child, and the following year they returned to Martinique where they both took up teaching jobs at the Lycée Schoelcher. They went on to have six children together, separating in April 1963 after 25 years of marriage.

== Literary career ==
Césaire wrote in French and published seven essays during her career as a writer. All seven of these essays were published between 1941 and 1945 inTropiques. Her writing explored themes such as Caribbean identity, civilisation, and surrealism.

While her writing was long largely unknown to Anglophone readers, excerpts from her essays "Leo Frobenius and the Problem of Civilisations", "A Civilisation's Discontent", "1943: Surrealism and Us", and "The Great Camouflage" were translated into English in the anthology The Refusal of the Shadow: Surrealism and the Caribbean (Verso, 1996), edited by Michael Richardson. All seven essays appeared in a 2012 volume, The Great Camouflage: Writings of Dissent (1941-1945), translated by Keith L. Walker.

Césaire had a particular affinity with surrealism, which she described as "the tightrope of our hope". In her essay "1943: Surrealism and Us", she called for a Martinican surrealism:

"Our surrealism will then deliver it the bread of its depths. Finally, those sordid contemporary antinomies of black/white, European/African, civilised/savage will be transcended. The magical power of the mahoulis will be recovered, drawn forth from living sources. Colonial stupidity will be purified in the blue welding flame. Our value as metal, our cutting edge of steel, our amazing communions will be recovered."

Césaire also developed a close relationship with André Breton following his visit to Martinique in 1941. She dedicated an essay to him ("André Breton, poet", 1941) and received a poem dedicated to her in return ("For madame Suzanne Césaire", 1941). This encounter with André Breton opened the way for her development of Afro-Surrealism.

Her writing is often overshadowed by that of her husband, who is better known. However, in addition to her important literary essays, her role as editor of Tropiques can be regarded as an equally significant (if often overlooked) contribution to Caribbean literature. Tropiques was the most influential francophone Caribbean journal of its time and is widely acknowledged for the foundational role it played in the development of Martiniquan literature. Césaire played both an intellectual and administrative role in the journal's success. She managed the journal's relations with the censor—a particularly difficult role given the oppositional stance of Tropiques towards the war-time Vichy government—as well as taking responsibility for the printing. The intellectual impact she had on the journal is underlined by her essay "The Great Camouflage", which was the closing article of the final issue. Despite her substantial written and editorial contribution to the journal, the collected works of Tropiques, published by Jean-Michel Place in 1978, credits Aimé Césaire and René Ménil as the journal's catalysts.

Tropiques published its last issue in September 1945, at the end of World War Two. With the closing of the journal, Suzanne Césaire stopped writing. The reasons for this are unknown. However, journalist Natalie Levisalles suggests that Suzanne Césaire would have perhaps made different choices if she had not had the responsibilities of mothering six children, teaching, and being the wife of an important politician and poet, Aimé Césaire. Indeed, her first daughter, Ina Césaire, remembers her saying regularly: "Yours will be the first generation of women who choose."

Having stopped writing she pursued her career as a teacher, working in Martinique and Haiti. She was also an active feminist and participated in the Union des Femmes Françaises.

== Reception and influence ==
Césaire was a pioneer in the search for a distinct Martiniquan literary voice. Though she was attacked by some Caribbean writers, following an early edition of Tropiques, for copying traditional French styles of poetry as well as supposedly promoting "The Happy Antilles" view of the island advanced by French colonialism, her essay of 1941, "Misère d'une poésie", condemned what she termed "Littérature de hamac. Littérature de sucre et de vanille. Tourisme littéraire" (Literature of the hammock, of sugar and vanilla. Literary tourism). Her encounter with André Breton opened the way for her development of Afro-Surrealism, which followed in the footsteps of her use of surrealist concepts to illuminate the colonial dilemma. Her dictum - "La poésie martiniquaise sera cannibale ou ne sera pas" (Cannibal poetry or nothing) - was an anti-colonial appropriation of a surrealist trope. Suzanne Césaire's repudiation of simple idealised answers - whether assimilationist, Africanist, or creole - to the situation of colonialism in the Caribbean has proved increasingly influential in later postcolonial studies.

Suzanne Césaire’s work from the first year of Tropiques raves over her European inspirations such as the German ethnographer Leo Frobenius, the French professor, philosopher, and art critic Emile Chartier, and the surrealist Andre Breton, and their potential position in Martinique. Suzanne Césaire created a portrait of the complexity of Caribbean identity to European literary tradition.

Recent scholar Joseph-Gabriel argues that Césaire contributed an influential foundation for subsequent Caribbean anti-imperialist literature and political activity. Although Césaire published relatively few essays, her continued influence can be traced via personal letters and also remembrances from Haitian students. In letters to Gauclére, Césaire described her role in Haiti as an emissary who provided teacher training, wrote literary analysis, and edited dissertations for the purpose of supporting Aime's teaching. Haitian student activists Gérald Bloncourt and Michael Löwy recalled Breton's public speaking on surrealism as helpful in inciting the overthrow of undemocratic Haitian President Lescot. Suzanne Cesaire's work celebrated the multiethnic and multicultural influences that formed the Caribbean cultural identity of her era. Though highly criticized for appropriating black stereotypes, she used them in her writing in order to provoke both the colonizer and colonized to reexamine their perceptions of race. She wrote "The most troubling reality is our own. We shall act. This land, our land, can only be what we want it to be".

== Works ==
=== Essays published in Tropiques ===
- "Leo Frobenius et le problème des civilisations" (April 1941)
- "Alain et l'esthétique" (July 1941)
- "André Breton, poète" (October 1941)
- "Misère d'une poésie" (January 1942)
- "Malaise d'une civilization" (April 1942)
- "1943: Le surréalisme et nous" (October 1943)
- "Le Grand camouflage" (1945)

=== Books ===
- Suzanne Césaire, Maximin, Daniel (2009). Suzanne Césaire: le grand camouflage. Écrits de dissidence (1941-1945), Daniel Maximin (éd.). Paris: Le Seuil. This book is a collection her seven literary essays.
- Suzanne Césaire, Maximin, Daniel (2012). The Great Camouflage: Writings of Dissent (1941-1945), Daniel Maximin (éd.), Keith L. Walker (tr.). Middletown: Wesleyan University Press. A translation of her seven literary essays.

=== English translations ===
- "The Malaise of a Civilization" and "The Great Camouflage" in Sharpley-Whiting, T. Denean (2002). Negritude Women. Translated by Sharpley-Whiting, T. Denean; Van Den Abbeele, Georges. Minneapolis: University of Minnesota. pp. 130–140).
- " Surrealism and Us" and "The Domain of the Marvelous" (extract from the essay «Alain et l'esthétique») in Caws, Mary Ann, ed. (2001). Manifesto: A Century of isms. Translated by Gibson, Erin. Lincoln: U. of Nebraska. pp. 488–492. ISBN 9780803264076.
- "The Domain of the Marvelous" (extract from the essay «Alain et l'esthétique») in Caws, Mary Ann, ed. (2001). Surrealist Painters and Poets: An Anthology. Translated by Gibson, Erin. Cambridge: MIT Press. p. 157.
- "André Breton, Poet", Guy Ducornet and Franklin Rosemont, translators; "Discontent of a Civilization", Penelope Rosemont, translator; "1943: Surrealism and Us" and "The Domain of the Marvelous" (extract from the essay "Alain et l'esthétique"), Erin Gibson, translator; in Rosemont, Penelope, ed. (1998). Surrealist Women: An International Anthology. Austin: University of Texas Press. pp. 127–137.
- "Leo Frobenius and the Problem of Civilizations", "A Civilization's Discontent", "1943 : Surrealism and Us" and "The Great Camouflage", Krzysztof Fijalkowski and Michael Richardson, translators; in Richardson, Michael, ed. (1997). Refusal of the Shadow: Surrealism and the Caribbean. London: Verso. pp. 82–87, 96–100, 123–126, 156–161.

== See also ==
- Antillanité
- Créolité
- Leo Frobenius
- Maryse Condé
- V. S. Naipaul
- Octave Mannoni
