= Étienne Léro =

Étienne Léro (1910–1939) was a French poet from region of Martinique, "the first person of African descent to publicly identify himself as a surrealist". In 1932 he helped found a literary journal Légitime Défense with Jules Monnerot and René Ménil. Other people involved in Légitime Défense include Pierre Yoyotte, Simone Yoyotte, Thelus Léro, Maurice Sabas-Quitman, Michel Pilotin and Auguste Thésée.

Badly wounded early in World War II, Léro died in a French military hospital.
