= Jeanne Nardal =

French writer and philosopher

Jeanne "Jane" Nardal
- Born: 1900
- Died: 1993 (aged 92–93)
- Education: Sorbonne University
- Occupations: Writer, philosopher, teacher
- Known for: Négritude movement
- Relatives: Paulette Nardal (sister)

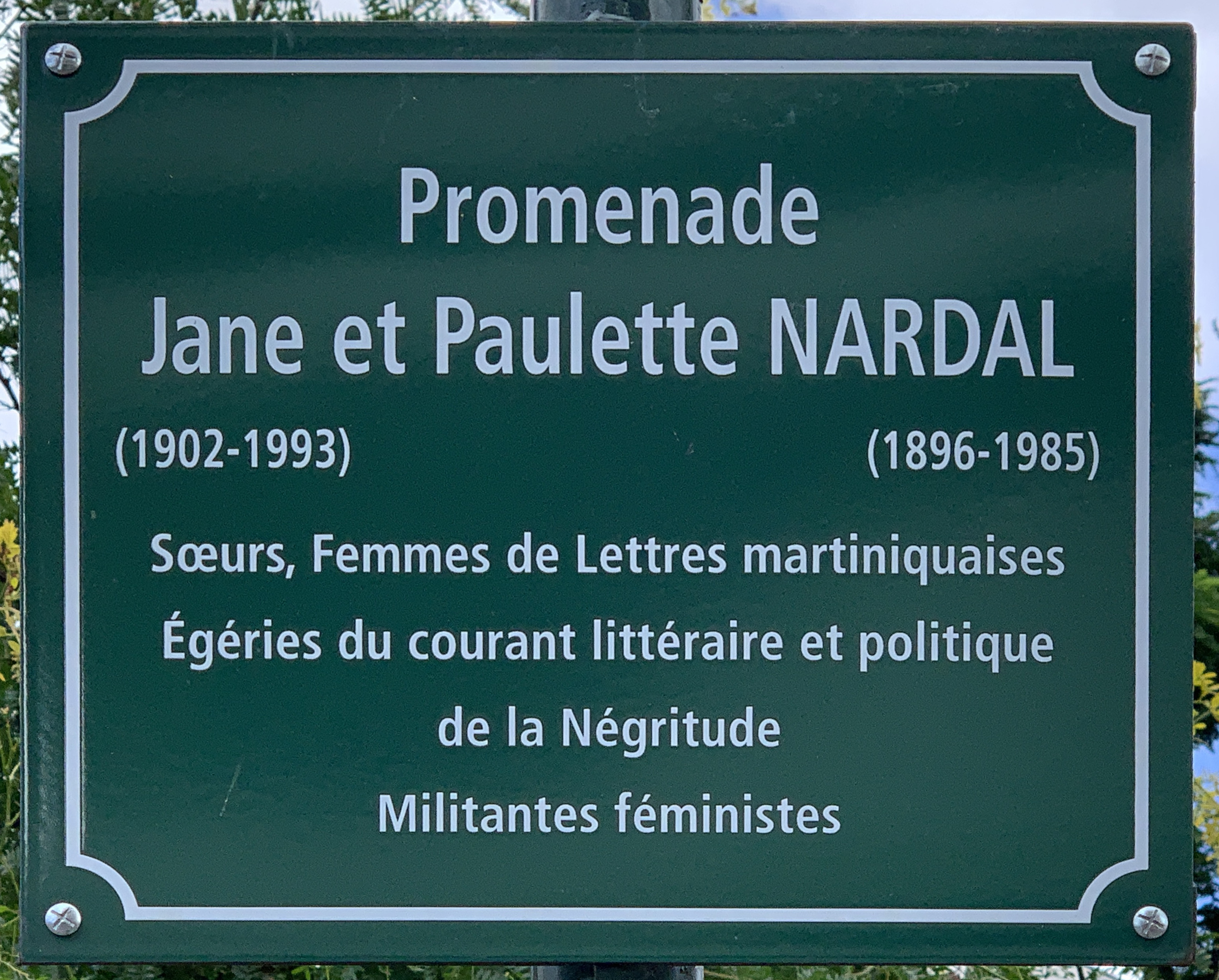
Plaque for the street named after Jane and Paulette Nardal in Paris

Jeanne "Jane" Nardal (1900 – 1993) was a French writer, philosopher, teacher, and political commentator from Martinique. She and her sister, Paulette Nardal, are considered to have laid the theoretical and philosophical groundwork of the Négritude movement, a cultural, political, and literary movement, which first emerged in 1930s, Paris and sought to unite Black intellectuals in the current and former French colonies. The term "Négritude" itself was coined by Martiniquan writer-activist Aimé Césaire, one of the three individuals formally recognized as the "fathers" of the cultural movement, along with Senegalese poet Léopold Senghor and French Guianese writer Léon Damas. It was not until relatively recently, however, that the women involved in the Négritude movement, including Jane and Paulette Nardal, began to receive the recognition they were due.

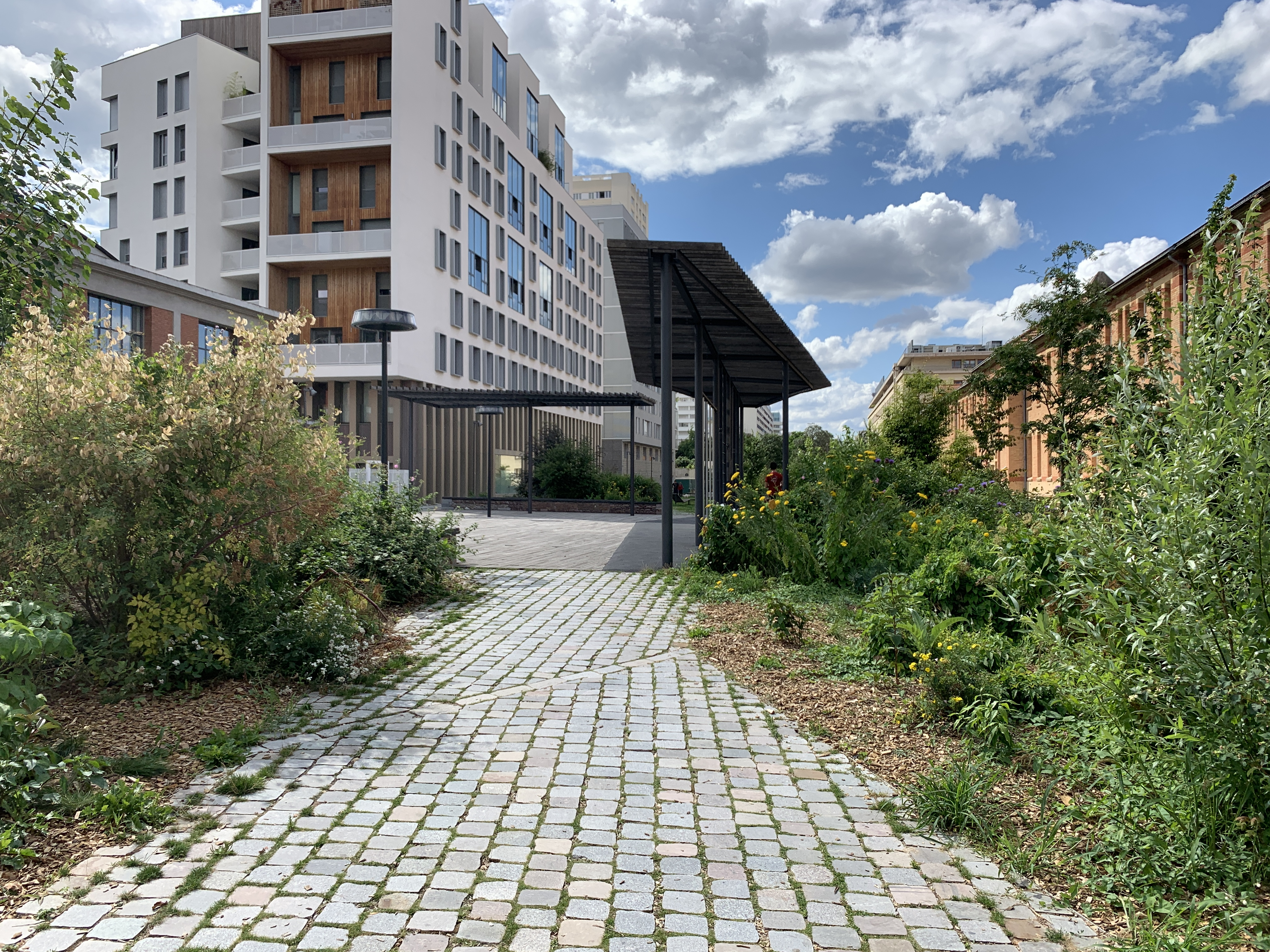
Promenade Jane Paulette Nardal, named in honor of Jane and her sister Paulette

== Ancestry ==
The Nardal's great-grandmother, Sidonie Nardal, was born into slavery in the region of Trinité, Martinique, best known at the time for its sugar production. She was recognized as a free person in 1850, two years after slavery was officially abolished throughout the French empire. Sidonie had five children; her son Joachim, Jane and Paulette's grandfather, was not registered as a free person until 1854. Joachim Nardal would eventually move to the capital of Saint-Pierre and go on to have two children: Marie-Hélène (born in 1861) and Paul Nardal (born in 1867), the Nardal sisters' father. The latter would eventually become the first black man after the abolition of slavery to earn a fellowship to attend l’École des Arts et Métiers (School of Arts and Careers) in Paris. He would eventually become the first black engineer to work for the Department of Public Works and also worked as a teacher training future engineers.

== Early family life ==
Jane Nardal was the fourth of seven daughters (Paulette, Emilie, Alice, Lucy, Cécile, Andrée) born to Paul Nardal, a Black engineer, and Louise Achille, a métisse (mixed) schoolteacher, prominent musician, and organizer. Paul and Louise instilled in their daughters a commitment to education and the arts. Though all of their children would grow up to become successful, well-educated women, Paulette and, to a lesser extent, Jane were most well known for their writings and political commentary.

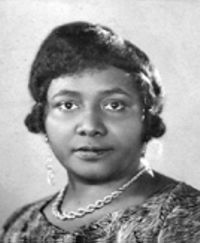
Paulette Nardal, Jane's sister

== Life in Paris ==
After completing her preparatory school education, Jane Nardal joined her sister Paulette in Paris in 1923 to study classic literature and French at the Sorbonne. The two of them were the first Martinican women to attend this institution. Over the course of their time in Paris, Paulette and Jane kept a Sunday literary salon where young Black intellectuals – including Césaire, Senghor and Damas, as well as African-American and West Indian scholars – met on a weekly basis to exchange theories and build a foundation for a budding race consciousness that would be influential throughout the Black diaspora. Paulette in particular acted as a point of contact between French-speaking Caribbean and African intellectuals and African-Americans scholars and musicians.

In February 1928, Jane was among the few female founding members of La Dépêche africaine, the official bimonthly newspaper of the Comité de défense des intérêts de la race noire (Committee for the Defense of the Interests of the Black Race). Her sister Paulette joined the staff in June of that same year. The journal would run on and off for four years, but nevertheless was one of the most popular Black newspapers at the time, printing 12,000–15,000 copies in 1929, compared to the average 2,000–3,000 copies printed by its competitors, including La Race Nègre and Le Cri des Nègres.

Jane and Paulette Nardal are credited with the rich global perspective provided in the sections "La Dépêche politique," "La Dépêche economique et sociale" and "La Dépêche littéraire" of La Dépêche africaine. Jane's specialties were primarily political and cultural; she wrote two critical essays for the paper, including "Internationalisme noir" (Black internationalism) which was published in the journal's very first issue. The essay discussed the awakening of race consciousness throughout the Black diaspora and provided some of the theoretical foundations for the Negritude movement. In the October 1928 issue of La Dépêche africaine, Jane published an essay entitled "Pantins exotiques" (Exotic puppets) which discussed Parisian fascination and exotification of black women and called for black intellectuals to resist the othering of their work.

In her writings, Jane also outlined pivotal concepts which would become central to the early Negritude movement, including the global community, Afro-Latin race consciousness, the New French-speaking Negro, and the après-guerre nègre. The latter concept links the formation of a Euro-American community after World War I to that of a global Black community and addresses the tensions existing within the Black community notably amongst Black elites, those who never experienced slavery, and those who had. She also discussed the construction of a Black diasporic identity, refusing to renounce her latinité (Afro-Latin heritage) or her africanité (African heritage).

== Life after Paris ==
Jane Nardal moved back to Martinique in 1929 where she hosted a conference on "Le chant Nègre aux Etats-Unis" (Black songs in the United States) with a focus on the influence of Blues. She would go on to pursue a successful career as a classics teacher, teaching in Martinique and, for two years, in Chad. She married Jules Joseph Zamia, a Guadeloupean doctor, in 1931.

Jane Nardal got into a good deal of trouble when she tried to enter politics. In 1956, someone threw a torch through the window of the Nardals' Martiniquan family home, burning a considerable amount of Paulette's correspondence and writings, in response to Jane's political activity. Jane was subsequently forbidden by her family to continue her involvement politics. Four years later, she began to go blind, and eventually pulled away from public life. She died in 1993.
