= Femi Ojo Ade =

- Born: 23 July 1941; Lagos, Nigeria
- Died: 19 March 2019 (aged 77); Waldorf, Maryland
- Citizenship: Nigerian
- Occupations: writer; poet; critics; novelist
- Years active: 1961–2019

Femi Ojo Ade was a Nigerian writer, novelist, poet, critic and professor emeritus of French Studies and Black History.

== Early life ==
Femi was born in Lagos, southwestern Nigeria. He had his primary education at Model Primary School in Yaba, Lagos State, and secondary education at Government College in Ibadan, where he obtained the Higher School Certificate in 1961. He later proceeded to McMaster University, where he received a Bachelor of Arts degree in French and Spanish in 1967, and a Master of Arts degree in French at Queen's University in 1969. In 1975, he received a doctorate degree (Ph.D.) in French at the University of Toronto. In 1975, he joined the services of Barber–Scotia College where he lectured briefly before he returned to Obafemi Awolowo University where he was appointed a professorship of French language in 1980. He served in several academic institutions with immense contributions to black literature and culture.
