= Donald E. Herdeck =

American academic and publisher (1924–2005)

- Born: Donald Elmer Herdeck; November 19, 1924; Chicago, Illinois, U.S.
- Died: April 20, 2005 (aged 80); Pueblo, Colorado, U.S.
- Education: Drake University; University of Pennsylvania
- Occupations: Academic and publisher
- Known for: Founder of Three Continents Press
- Spouse: Margaret Herdeck

Donald E. Herdeck (November 19, 1924 – April 20, 2005) was an American academic and publisher, and the founder in 1973 of Three Continents Press.

== Biography ==
Donald Elmer Herdeck was born on November 19, 1924, in Chicago, Illinois. He attended Drake University in Des Moines, then served in the U.S. Army and Army Air Forces from 1944 to 1946. In the early 1950s, he traveled in Europe and studied in Italy and France. He subsequently taught at Girard College in Philadelphia, while doing graduate studies at the University of Pennsylvania.

Joining the US Foreign Service in 1953, Herdeck spent some years in Italy, and in 1960 he was posted to Guinea in West Africa, developing an interest in African literature. He said: "I started reading African novels. I was surprised to know there were any. I'd never heard of any. First in English, but then I started buying titles published in French." However, while in Africa he fell ill with malaria and hepatitis and returned to the US. He left the State Department in 1963, completed his doctoral dissertation and received his PhD from University of Pennsylvania in 1968.

He began teaching in the English department of Georgetown University, Washington, D.C., in 1965, and in 1974 became an associate professor of English and foreign service, eventually concentrating on the literature of the Third World, and creating a course that addressed world political issues through art and fiction. He also did some teaching of African Literature at Howard University. His mission to promote the work of many neglected writers – from Africa, the Caribbean, the Middle East and other regions – led him to found in 1973 a small publishing house called Three Continents Press, which struggled to be profitable yet went on to become one of the foremost publishers of Third World literature, and of works translated from many languages. In 1988, one of Herdeck's authors, the Egyptian novelist Naguib Mahfouz, was awarded the Nobel Prize for Literature, and another future Nobel Prize winner on the Three Continents list was Saint Lucian poet Derek Walcott.

After retiring from teaching at Georgetown in 1987, Herdeck continued to head his two-person publishing company, moving it in 1993 to Colorado Springs. Over the years that he ran Three Continents Press, the imprint published some 300 titles, and he was once quoted as saying: "We've published people from every continent except Antarctica. We don't do anything there, but if the penguins learned to write, we would."

Herdeck suffered a stroke in February 1995, and in August 1996 sold 167 of his titles to Lynne Rienner, another Colorado publisher; however, he subsequently set up a new company, Passeggiata Press, for the titles to which he retained rights.

He was the editor or author of the key reference books African Authors, 1300–1973 (1973; revised edition, 1974) and Caribbean Writers: A Bio-Bibliographical-Critical Encyclopedia (1979, co-edited with his wife Margaret Herdeck, Maurice Lubin, John Figueroa and Dorothy Figueroa, and Jose Alcantara), and in 1998 Appreciating the Difference: The Autobiography of Three Continents Press, 1973–1997.

Herdeck died of congestive heart failure at his home in Pueblo, Colorado, in 2005, aged 80.
