= L'Étudiant noir =

Magazine published in 1935

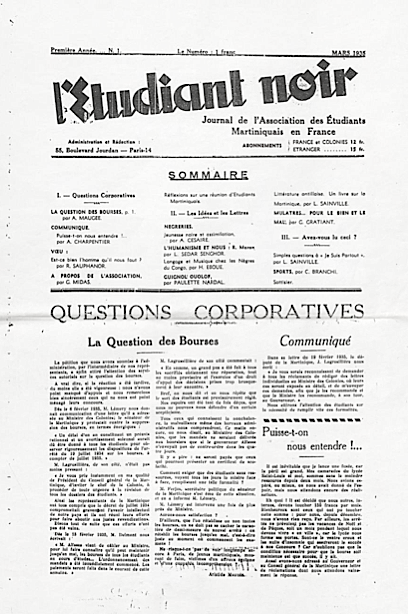
Cover of the first issue of L'Étudiant noir (Paris, March 1935)

L'Étudiant noir, subtitled Journal mensuel de l’association des étudiants martiniquais en France (roughly translated as "The Black Student, Monthly Journal of the Association of Martinique Students in France"), was a journal created by the Martinican Aimé Césaire in 1935 in Paris. The Guyanese Léon-Gontran Damas published his first pigmentary poems, and Senegalese Léopold Sédar Senghor published his first articles in the magazine while they were students. Damas stated the journal as "...a corporative and combative journal which aimed to end tribalization and the clan system in force in the Latin Quarter! We ceased to be Martinican, Guadeloupean, Guyanese, African and Malagasy students and became one and the same black student."

Only two issues of the journal are available, those of March 1935 and May–June 1935.

It was in an article entitled Conscience raciale et révolution sociale ("Racial Consciousness and Social Revolution") in L'Étudiant noir (May–June 1935) that Aimé Césaire would express his concept of Negritude, which he would continue throughout his work.
