= Aimé Césaire =

Martinican writer, poet and politician (1913–2008)

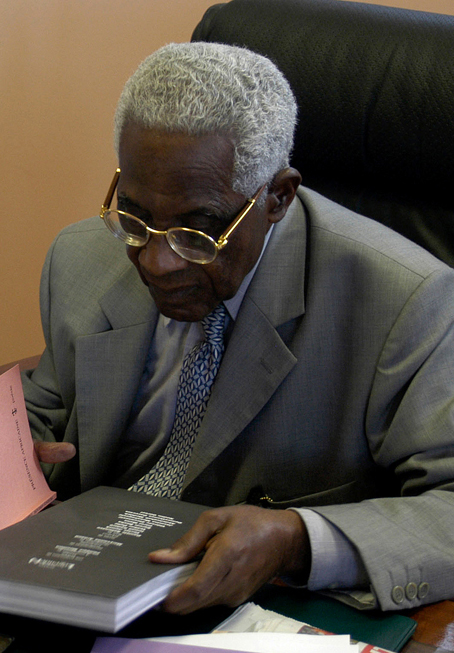
- Césaire in 2003
- Born: Aimé Fernand David Césaire; 26 June 1913; Basse-Pointe, Martinique, France
- Died: 17 April 2008 (aged 94); Fort-de-France, Martinique, France
- Education: École Normale Supérieure
- Occupations: Poet, author and politician
- Known for: Négritude movement
- Notable work: Cahier d'un retour au pays natal (1939); Discours sur le colonialisme
- Political party: Martinican Progressive Party
- Spouse: Suzanne Roussi (m. 1937; div. 1963)
- Children: 6

Aimé Fernand David Césaire (/seɪˈzɛər/; French: [ɛme fɛʁnɑ̃ david sezɛʁ]; 26 June 1913 – 17 April 2008) was a Martinican poet, author, and politician. He was one of the founders of the Négritude movement in Francophone literature and coined the word "négritude" in French.

He founded the Parti progressiste martiniquais in 1958. He served in the French National Assembly from 1945 to 1993 and as President of the Regional Council of Martinique from 1983 to 1988. He was the Mayor of Fort-de-France for 56 years, from 1945 to 2001.

His works include the book-length poem Cahier d'un retour au pays natal (1939), Une Tempête, a response to William Shakespeare's play The Tempest, and Discours sur le colonialisme (Discourse on Colonialism), an essay describing the strife between the colonizers and the colonized. Césaire's works have been translated into many languages.

== Student, educator and poet ==
Aimé Césaire was born in Basse-Pointe, Martinique, French Caribbean, in 1913. His father was a tax inspector, and his mother was a dressmaker. "Although in his Cahier he evoked his childhood as poverty-stricken and squalid, his family was part of the island's small, black middle class." His family moved to the capital of Martinique, Fort-de-France, in order for Césaire to attend the only secondary school on the island, Lycée Victor Schœlcher. He was not happy there, and found the town's racial and class bigotry to be upsetting.

They lived near Mount Pelée, and Césaire often described himself as possessing similar characteristics to the volcano—impulsive, unpredictable, and explosive.

He believed that he was of Igbo descent, and thought of his first name Aimé as a retention of an Igbo name; though the name is of French origin, ultimately from the Old French word amée, meaning beloved, its pronunciation is similar to the Igbo eme, which forms the basis for many Igbo given names.

Césaire traveled to Paris to attend the Lycée Louis-le-Grand on an educational scholarship. There, he became acquainted with Léopold Sédar Senghor. Along with Léon Damas, whom Césaire had met in secondary school, they bonded over a shared intellectual interest in French poetry.

In Paris, he passed the entrance exam for the École Normale Supérieure in 1935 and created the literary review L'Étudiant noir (The Black Student) with Léopold Sédar Senghor and Léon Damas. (Note: All three had careers in politics: Césaire represented Martinique in the French National Assembly for 48 years, Senghor was president for 20 years of independent Senegal, and Damas represented French Guiana in the French National Assembly for three years.) Manifestos by these three students in its third number (May–June 1935) initiated the Négritude movement later substantial in both pan-Africanist theory and the actual decolonization of the French Empire in Africa.

In 1934, Césaire was invited by his friend Petar Guberina to the Kingdom of Yugoslavia, where in Šibenik he started writing his poem Notebook of a Return to the Native Land – one of the first expressions of the concept of Négritude.

Upon returning home to Martinique in 1936, Césaire began work on his long poem Cahier d'un retour au pays natal (Notebook of a Return to the Native Land), a poetic exploration of Caribbean life and cultural complexities in the New World. The work was part of the Négritude movement.

Césaire married fellow Martinican student Suzanne Roussi in 1937. Together they moved back to Martinique in 1939 with their young son. Césaire became a teacher at the Lycée Schoelcher in Fort-de-France, where Frantz Fanon was a student. He became a significant influence on Fanon's intellectual development and ideas, being the first person to read Fanon's manuscripts. Césaire also served as an inspiration for, but did not teach, writer Édouard Glissant.

== World War II ==
The years of World War II were a period of increased literary and intellectual engagement for the Césaires. In 1941, Césaire and Suzanne Roussi founded the literary review Tropiques, with the help of other Martinican intellectuals such as René Ménil and Aristide Maugée, in order to challenge the cultural status quo and alienation that characterized Martinican identity at the time. In this sense, according to Ursula K. Heise, the publications of the French botanist Henri Stehlé in Tropiques in the early 1940s, concerning the Martinican flora, and "the invocations of Césaire to the Antillean ecology operate as indices of a racial and cultural authenticity which is distinguished from European identity...".

During an 1978 interview, Césaire explains that his aim for including these articles in Tropiques was "to allow Martinique to refocus" and "to lead Martinicans to reflect" on their close environment. Despite instances of censorship, Césaire continued to advocate for Martinican cultural identity. He also became close to French surrealist poet André Breton, who spent time in Martinique during the war. The two had met in 1940, and Breton later championed Césaire's work.

In 1947, his book-length poem Cahier d'un retour au pays natal, which had first appeared in the Parisian periodical Volontés in 1939 after rejection by a French book publisher, was published. The book mixes poetry and prose to express Césaire's thoughts on the cultural identity of black Africans in a colonial setting. Breton contributed a laudatory introduction to this 1947 edition, saying that the "poem is nothing less than the greatest lyrical monument of our times". When asked by René Depestre about his writing style, Césaire replied by saying that "Surrealism provided me with what I had been confusedly searching for."

== Political career ==
Aimé Césaire

Mayor of Fort-de-France
- In office 25 May 1945 – 18 March 2001
- Preceded by: Victor Sévère
- Succeeded by: Serge Letchimy

Deputy for Martinique (proportional representation) in the National Assembly of France, 4th Republic
- In office 21 October 1945 – 8 December 1958
- Preceded by: New Republic
- Succeeded by: Self and others (5th Republic)
- Parliamentary group: Communist (1945–1956); Independent (Non-Inscrit) (1956–1958)

Deputy for Martinique's 3rd constituency in the National Assembly of France
- In office 9 December 1958 – 1 April 1986
- Preceded by: Self and others (proportional representation in 4th republic)
- Succeeded by: Self and others (proportional representation)
- Parliamentary group: Independent (1958–1978); Socialist (Associated) (1978–1986)

Deputy for Martinique (proportional representation) in the National Assembly of France
- In office 2 April 1986 – 14 May 1988
- Parliamentary group: Socialist Group

Deputy for Martinique's 3rd constituency in the National Assembly of France
- In office 23 June 1988 – 1 April 1993
- Preceded by: Self and others (proportional representation)
- Succeeded by: Camille Darsières
- Parliamentary group: Socialist Group

Personal details
- Party: PCF; PPM

In 1945, with the support of the French Communist Party (PCF), Césaire was elected mayor of Fort-de-France and deputy to the French National Assembly for Martinique. He managed to get a law addressing departmentalization approved unanimously on 19 March 1946. While departmentalization was implemented in 1946, the status did not bring many meaningful changes to the people of Martinique.

Like many left-wing intellectuals in 1930s and 1940s France, Césaire looked toward the Soviet Union as a source of progress, virtue, and human rights. He later grew disillusioned with the Soviet Union after the 1956 suppression of the Hungarian Revolution. He announced his resignation from the PCF in a text entitled Lettre à Maurice Thorez (Letter to Maurice Thorez).

In 1958, Césaire founded the Parti Progressiste Martiniquais. Césaire and the Parti Progressiste Martiniquais remained influential in Martinique's politics during the latter half of the 20th century. Césaire declined to renew his mandate as deputy in the National Assembly in 1993, after a 47-year continuous term.

His writings during this period reflect his passion for civic and social engagement. In 1950, he wrote Discours sur le colonialisme (Discourse on Colonialism), a critique of European colonial practices and attitudes. In 1955, it was republished in the French review Présence Africaine, with an English translation 1957. In 1960, he published Toussaint Louverture, based on the life of the Haitian revolutionary. In 1969, he published the first version of Une Tempête, an adaptation of Shakespeare's The Tempest with themes resonating with a black audience.

Césaire served as President of the Regional Council of Martinique from 1983 to 1988. He retired as mayor of Fort-de-France in 2001, thus ending his political career.

== Later life ==
In 2006, Césaire refused to meet the leader of the Union for a Popular Movement (UMP), Nicolas Sarkozy, a potential contender at the time for the 2007 presidential election, because the UMP had voted for the 2005 French law on colonialism. This law required teachers and textbooks to "acknowledge and recognize in particular the positive role of the French presence abroad, especially in North Africa", a law criticized by opponents for its positive portrayal of French colonialism, especially during the Algerian War. President Jacques Chirac finally had the controversial law repealed.

On 9 April 2008, Césaire had serious heart troubles and was admitted to Pierre Zobda Quitman hospital in Fort-de-France. He died on 17 April 2008, aged 94.

Césaire was accorded the honor of a state funeral, held at the Stade de Dillon in Fort-de-France on 20 April. French President Nicolas Sarkozy was present but did not make a speech. The honor of making the funeral oration was left to his longtime friend Pierre Aliker, who had served for many years as deputy mayor under Césaire.

== Legacy ==
Martinique's airport at Le Lamentin was renamed Martinique Aimé Césaire International Airport on 15 January 2007. A national commemoration ceremony was held on 6 April 2011, as a plaque in Césaire's name was inaugurated in the Panthéon in Paris. He was also proclaimed as a national hero in Martinique.

Césaire's influence has been recognized in poetry from his era and in later works. Most notably, his relation to Frantz Fanon, famed author of Black Skin, White Masks, as mentor and inspiration is tangible. Fanon's personal testimony in Black Skin, White Masks explains the "liberating effect of Césaire's word and action" that he felt in traversing the changing colonial landscape. At one point, Fanon writes: "Once again I come back to Césaire; I wish that many black intellectuals would turn to him for their inspiration."

More generally, Césaire's works conceptualised African unity and black culture in ways that allowed for the creation of black spaces where there previously were none, from the establishment of several literary journals to his reworking of Caliban's speech from Shakespeare's The Tempest. Césaire's works have been described as significant contributions to postcolonial literature in France, its former colonies, and the Caribbean. In 2021, the Musée de l'Homme for its Portraits de France exhibition paid tribute to Aimé Césaire through a work by the artist Hom Nguyen.

== Works ==
=== Discourse on Colonialism ===
Césaire's Discourse on Colonialism challenges the narrative of the colonizer and the colonized. This text criticizes the hypocrisy of justifying colonization with the equation "Christianity=civilized, paganism=savagery" comparing white colonizers to "savages". Césaire writes that "no one colonizes innocently, that no one colonizes with impunity either" concluding that "a nation which colonizes, that a civilization which justifies colonization – and therefore force – is already a sick civilization". He condemns the colonizers, saying that though the men may not be inherently bad, the practice of colonization ruins them.

Césaire's text intertwines slavery, imperialism, capitalism, republicanism, and modernism, stating that they were linked together and influenced one another in undeniable ways. Importantly, all of those oppressive forces came together to hurt the colonized and empower the colonizer. This position was considered radical at the time.

Césaire continues to deconstruct the colonizer, and ultimately concludes that by colonizing those white men often lose touch with who they were, and become brutalized into hidden instincts that result in the rape, torture, and race hatred that they put onto the people they colonize. He also examines the effects colonialism has on the colonized, stating that "colonization = 'thing-ification'", where because the colonizers are able to "other" the colonized, they can justify the means by which they colonize.

Plaque commemorating Aimé Césaire on Aimé Césaire Boulevard in Nanterre

The text also continuously references Nazism, blaming the barbarism of colonialism, and how whitewashed and accepted the tradition is, for Adolf Hitler's rise to power. He says that Hitler lives within and is the demon of "the very distinguished, very humanistic, very Christian bourgeois of the twentieth century". Particularly, Césaire argues that Nazism was not an exception or singular event in European history; rather, the natural progression of a civilization that justified colonization without "perceiving the dangers involved in proceeding towards savagery". Césaire compared colonial violence to Nazism, arguing: "they tolerated that Nazism before it was inflicted on them, they absolved it, shut their eyes to it, legitimized it, because, until then, it had been applied only to non-European peoples."

Césaire's wishes for post-war Europe centered on decolonization, arguing that decolonization was the way forward for Europe out of "the binarism of capitalism/communism". Césaire believed that the only possible redemption for Europe's dark path which had led to Nazism was through interactions with the "Third World". Decolonization offered an alternative to the dual negatives of capitalism and communism, employing pluralism as a way to usher in a new, more tolerant Europe. He was critical of neo-imperialism and US capitalism. Critiques of French universalism were also apparent in the text, particularly citing the issues that universalism caused for the departmentalization of Martinique of which Césaire was the main propagator. Departmentalization was an important goal for Césaire both in his texts and in his political career.

Césaire originally wrote his text in French in 1950, but later worked with Joan Pinkham to translate it to English. The translated version was published in 1972.

== See also ==
- Créolité
- Antillanité
- Octave Mannoni
- Imperial boomerang

== Footnotes ==
=== References ===
- "Aimé Césaire, Martinique Poet and Politician, Dies at 94". The New York Times. Associated Press. 18 April 2008. Archived from the original on 4 November 2011.
- Auster, Paul, ed. (1982). The Random House Book of Twentieth-Century French Poetry: with Translations by American and British Poets (in English and French). New York: Random House. ISBN 9780394521978 – via Internet Archive.
- Azuonye, Chukwuma (1990). "Igbo Names in the Nominal Roll of Amelié, An Early 19th Century Slave Ship from Martinique: Reconstructions, Interpretations and Inferences" (PDF). Africana Studies Faculty Publication Series. 8. University of Massachusetts Boston.
- Brossard, Lise (2014). "Que retenir de la revue Tropiques? Journée d'étude du CRILLASH (Centre de Recherches Interdisciplinaire en Lettres, Langues, Arts et Sciences Humaines), Université des Antilles et de la Guyane, organisée par Dominique Berthet (Revues Gaiac et Recherches en esthétique)". La Revue des revues (in French). 52 (2): 89–91. doi:10.3917/rdr.052.0089.
- "Caribbean poet Cesaire dies at 94". BBC News. 17 April 2008. Archived from the original on 2 March 2021.
- Césaire, Aimé (24 October 1956). "Lettre à Maurice Thorez". Présence Africaine (in French). p. 7. Archived from the original on 26 August 2022 – via Collectif Les mots sont importants. Translated as Césaire, Aimé (Summer 2010). "Letter to Maurice Thorez" (PDF). Social Text. 28 (2). Translated by Jeffers, Chike: 145–152. doi:10.1215/01642472-2009-072. Archived (PDF) from the original on 5 September 2022 – via Abahlali baseMjondolo.
- Césaire, Aimé & Ménil, René, eds. (1978). "Entretien avec Aimé Césaire par Jacqueline Leiner" [Interview with Aimé Césaire by Jacqueline Leiner]. Tropiques, 1941–1945: Collection complète (in French). Paris: Éditions Jean-Michel Place. ISBN 9782858932054. OCLC 5234124.
- Césaire, Aimé (2000) [1955]. Discourse on Colonialism. Translated by Pinkham, Joan. New York: Monthly Review Press. ISBN 9781583670248 – via Internet Archive.
- Césaire, Aimé (2001). Eshleman, Clayton & Smith, Annette (eds.). Notebook of a Return to the Native Land. Wesleyan Poetry. With an introduction by André Breton. Middletown, CT: Wesleyan University Press. ISBN 9780819564528 – via Google Books.
- "Décret du 16 mars 2011 décidant d'un hommage de la Nation à Aimé Césaire au Panthéon" [Decree of 16 March 2011 deciding on a tribute from the Nation to Aimé Césaire at the Pantheon]. JORF (in French). 64. p. 4829, text no. 37. 17 March 2011. NOR MCCB1105232D. Archived from the original on 14 September 2022 – via Légifrance.
- Diop, Papa Samba (2011). La poésie d'Aimé Césaire. Propositions de lecture, accompagnées d'un lexique de l'oeuvre [The Poetry of Aimé Césaire: Reading Suggestions, Accompanied by a Glossary of the Oeuvre]. Bibliothèque de littérature générale et comparée (in French). Paris: Éditions Honoré Champion. ISBN 9782745321732.
- "Le document qui a lancé le mouvement de la négritude - Conscience Raciale et Révolution Sociale d'Aimé Césaire" [The document that launched the Négritude movement - Racial Consciousness and Social Revolution by Aimé Césaire.]. l'Etudiant Noir (in French). Archived from the original on 16 October 2021.
- Fanon, Frantz (1967) [1952]. Black Skin, White Masks. New York: Grove Press. LCCN 66030411. OCLC 1508573638.
- Ferguson, James (20 April 2008). "Obituary: Aimé Césaire". The Guardian. Archived from the original on 23 June 2022. "Césaire was born at Basse-Pointe, a small town on Martinique's north coast [. . .] His family was part of the island's small, black middle class, with his father employed as a tax inspector."
- Filostrat, Christian (Autumn 1980). "La Négritude et la 'Conscience raciale et révolutionaire sociale' d'Aimé Césaire" [Négritude and Aimé Césaire's 'Racial and Social Revolutionary Consciousness']. Présence Francophone (in French). 21: 119–130. ISSN 0048-5195.
- Fonkoua, Romuald (2010). Aimé Césaire (1913–2008) (in French). Paris: Éditions Perrin. ISBN 9782262029524 – via Internet Archive.
- Getachew, Adom & Mantena, Karuna (2021). "Anticolonialism and the Decolonization of Political Theory". Critical Times. 4 (3): 359–388. doi:10.1215/26410478-9355193. ISSN 2641-0478. S2CID 236379613.
- Heise, Ursula (2008). "Surréalisme et écologies: les métamorphoses d'Aimé Césaire" [Surrealism and ecologies: the metamorphoses of Aimé Césaire]. Écologie & politique (in French). 36 (2): 69–83. doi:10.3917/ecopo.036.0069.
- Heiskanen, Jaakko (December 2021). "In the Shadow of Genocide: Ethnocide, Ethnic Cleansing, and International Order". Global Studies Quarterly. 1 (4) ksab030: 1–10. doi:10.1093/isagsq/ksab030.
- Heller, Ben A. (2004). "Césaire, Aimé". In Balderston, Daniel; Gonzalez, Mike (eds.). Encyclopedia of Latin American and Caribbean Literature, 1900–2003. London & New York: Routledge. pp. 128–130. doi:10.4324/9780203316115. ISBN 9780203316115.
- Herdeck, Donald E., ed. (1979). "Aimé Césaire". Caribbean Writers: A Bio-Bibliographical-Critical Encyclopedia. Washington, DC: Three Continents Press. ISBN 9780914478744.
- Hummel, Pascale; Lejeune, Anne; Peyceré, David (1995). "Principaux textes législatifs et règlementaires relatifs à l'école normale supérieure" [Main legislative and regulatory texts relating to the École Normale Supérieure]. Pour une histoire de l'École normale supérieure: Source d'archives 1794–1993 [Towards a History of the École Normale Supérieure: Archival Sources 1794–1993]. Histoire de l'ENS (in French). Paris: Éditions Rue d'Ulm. pp. 183–186. doi:10.4000/books.editionsulm.1198. ISBN 9782821829695. "10 novembre 1903 Décret relatif à la réorganisation de l'École normale supérieure, rattachée à l'Université." [10 November 1903 Decree relating to the reorganization of the École Normale Supérieure, attached to the University.]
- Irele, Francis Abiola (2009). "The Poetic Legacy of Aimé Césaire". French Politics, Culture & Society. 27 (3): 81–97. doi:10.3167/fpcs.2009.270310. JSTOR 42843618.
- Joubert, Jean-Louis (1999). "Césaire, Aimé". In Laffont, Robert; Bompiani, Valentino (eds.). Dictionnaire encyclopédique de la littérature française. Bouquins (in French). Paris: Éditions Robert Laffont. ISBN 9782221089538.
- Lanzi, Carla Bucero (4 December 2021). "Portraits de France: une exposition rend hommage aux grandes figures des Outre-mer et de l'immigration" [Portraits of France: an exhibition pays tribute to the great figures of the Overseas Territories and immigration]. Portail des Outre-mer La 1ère (in French). La Première. Archived from the original on 3 April 2022.
- Lotem, Itay (25 January 2016). "A decade after the riots, France has rewritten its colonial history". The Conversation. Archived from the original on 6 May 2022.
- Malela, Buata B. (2008). Les écrivains afro-antillais à Paris (1920–1960). Stratégies et postures identitaires [Afro-Caribbean Writers in Paris (1920–1960): Identitarian Strategies and Postures]. Lettres du Sud (in French). Paris: Éditions Karthala. ISBN 9782845869790 – via Google Books.
- Malela, Buata B. (2019). Aimé Césaire et la relecture de la colonialité du pouvoir [Aimé Césaire and the Rereading of the Coloniality of Power]. Collection Liziba (in French). Preface by Jean Bessière. Paris: Anibwe. ISBN 9782916121963.
- Malela, Buata B. & Dickow, Alexander, eds. (2018). Albert Camus, Aimé Césaire. Poétiques de la révolte [Albert Camus, Aimé Césaire: Poetics of Revolt] (in French). With the collaboration of Gérald Désert. Paris: Éditions Hermann. ISBN 9782705697501.
- Micklin, Anna (23 May 2008). "Aimé Césaire (1913-2008)". BlackPast.org. Archived from the original on 4 May 2022.
- Ojo-Ade, Femi (2010). Aimé Césaire's African Theater: Of Poets, Prophets and Politicians. Trenton, NJ: Africa World Press. ISBN 9781592217380.
- Piškur, Bojana (2019). "Southern Constellations: Other Histories, Other Modernities". In Soban, Tamara (ed.). Southern Constellations: The Poetics of the Non-Aligned (PDF). Ljubljana: Moderna galerija. pp. 9–24. ISBN 9789612061388. Archived from the original (PDF) on 12 June 2022.
- Reilly, Brian J. (2020). "Négritude's Contretemps: The Coining and Reception of Aimé Césaire's Neologism". Philological Quarterly. 99 (4): 377–398.
- Sarkozy, Nicolas (2020). Le Temps des tempêtes [The Time of Storms] (in French). Vol. 1. Paris: Éditions de l'Observatoire. ISBN 9791032917169.
- Stehlé, Henri (1946). "Les dénominations génériques des végétaux aux Antilles françaises: histoires et légendes qui s'y attachent" [The generic names of plants in the French West Indies: stories and legends attached to them]. Tropiques (in French). 10: 53–87.
- Storey, Thomas (5 November 2013). "Some Thoughts on Aimé Césaire: The Father of Négritude". Culture Trip. Archived from the original on 9 October 2021.
- Viveros-Vigoya, Mara (2019). "The political vitality and vital politics of Césaire's Discourse on Colonialism: A reading in light of contemporary racism" (PDF). The Sociological Review. 68 (3): 476–491. doi:10.1177/0038026119868654. S2CID 203083086. Archived (PDF) from the original on 14 September 2022.
- Younis, Musab (5 December 2024). "The Mouth of Calamities". London Review of Books. Vol. 46, no. 23.
