= Léon Damas =

French poet and politician (1912–1978)

- Born: March 28, 1912; Cayenne, French Guiana
- Died: January 28, 1978 (aged 65); Washington, D.C., United States
- Resting place: Guyana
- Other name: Lionel Georges André Cabassou
- Occupations: Poet and politician
- Notable work: Pigments (1937)

Léon-Gontran Damas (March 28, 1912 – January 22, 1978) was a French poet and politician. He was one of the founders of the Négritude movement. He also used the pseudonym Lionel Georges André Cabassou.

== Biography ==
Léon Damas was born in Cayenne, French Guiana, to Ernest Damas, a mulatto of European and African descent, and Bathilde Damas, a Metisse of Native American and African ancestry. In 1924, Damas was sent to Martinique to attend the Lycée Victor Schoelcher (a secondary school), where he would meet his lifelong friend and collaborator Aimé Césaire.

In 1929, Damas moved to Paris, France, to continue his studies. While he studied law under guidance from his parents, his diverse array of courses in other topics like anthropology, history, and literature sparked his interest in radical politics. There, he reunited with Césaire and was introduced to Léopold Senghor.

In 1935, the three young men published the first issue of the literary review L'Étudiant noir (The Black Student), which provided the foundation for what is now known as the Négritude Movement, a literary and ideological movement of French-speaking black intellectuals that rejects the political, social and moral domination of the West.

In 1937, Damas published his first volume of poetry, Pigments. The collection reflected his unique literary style, using the French colonial language to break boundaries of verse, meter, and metaphor. Pigments touches on topics of racism, broader issues in the Western colonial culture, and more. Through Pigments, Damas explored the internalized racism and oppression that occurred within the diaspora, partly paving the way for Frantz Fanon's "colonized personality", explored in his seminal work, The Wretched of the Earth. Though Pigments was eventually banned by the French government as a "threat to the security of the state", before its removal, it was translated and distributed across several countries and continents.

He enlisted in the French Army during World War II, and later was elected to the French National Assembly (1948–51) as a deputy from Guiana. In the following years, Damas traveled and lectured widely in Africa, the United States, Latin America and the Caribbean. He also served as the contributing editor of Présence Africaine, one of the most respected journals of Black studies, and as senior adviser and UNESCO delegate for the Society of African Culture.

In 1970, Damas and his Brazilian-born wife Marietta moved to Washington, D.C., to take a summer teaching job at Georgetown University. During the last years of his life, he taught at Howard University in Washington, D.C., and served as acting director of the school's African Studies program. He died on January 22, 1978, in Washington, and was buried in Guyana.

Although the political aspect of his poetry held less appeal in the later years of the 20th century, Damas's reputation was on the rise. His poems, which sometimes experimented with typography and with the sound of words, were astonishingly modern for their time, and they seemed to anticipate the black poetry, both English and French, of a much later timeframe.

== Works ==
=== Books ===
- Herdeck, Donald, ed., Caribbean Writers: A Bio-Bibliographical-Critical Encyclopedia, Three Continents Press, 1979.
- Racine, Daniel L., ed., Léon-Gontran Damas, 1912–1978: founder of Negritude, A Memorial Casebook, University Press of America, 1979.
- Tucker, Martin, ed., Literary Exile in the Twentieth Century, Greenwood Press, 1991.
- Warner, Keith Q., comp. and ed., Critical Perspectives on Léon-Gontran Damas, Three Continents Press, 1988.
- Wordworks, Manitou, ed., Modern Black Writers, St. James, 2000.

=== Poetry ===
- Pigments. Paris: Guy Lévis Mano (1937). Paris: Présence Africaine (1962).
- Poèmes nègres sur des airs Africains. Paris: Guy Lévis Mano (1948).
- Graffiti. Paris: Seghers (1952).
- Black-Label. Paris: Gallimard (1956).
- Névralgies. Paris: Présence Africaine (1966).
- Mine de Rien. Collection of 36 poems. Washington, DC (1977), quoted in Christian Filostrat, Negritude Agonistes, Africana Homestead Legacy Publishers, 2008, ISBN 978-0-9818939-2-1
- La Poésie de Léon G. Damas.

=== Essays ===
- Retour de Guyane. Paris: José Corti (1938).
- Poètes d'expression française. Paris: Seuil (1947).
- Poèmes Nègres sur des airs africains. Paris: G.L.M. Éditeurs (1948).

=== Stories ===
- Veillées noires, Contes Nègres de Guyane. Paris: Stock, 1943. Montréal: Leméac (1972).

=== Recordings ===
- Poésie de la Negritude: Léon Damas Reads Selected Poems from Pigments, Graffiti, Black Label, and Nevralgies (Folkways Records, 1967)

== See also ==
- Négritude
