= Négritude =

African intellectual movement

Négritude (from French "nègre" and "-itude" to denote a condition that can be translated as "Blackness"; pronounced [neɡʁityd]) is a framework of critique and literary theory, mainly developed by francophone intellectuals, writers, politicians, and visual artists in the African diaspora during the 1930s, aimed at raising and cultivating "black consciousness" across Africa and its diaspora. The progenitors of Négritude included the Martinican poet Aimé Césaire, Abdoulaye Sadji, Léopold Sédar Senghor (the first President of Senegal), and Léon Damas of French Guiana.

Négritude intellectuals disavowed colonialism, racism and Eurocentrism. They promoted African culture within a framework of persistent Franco-African ties. The intellectuals employed Marxist political philosophy, in the black radical tradition. Writers borrowed heavily from Surrealist style, frequently examining diasporic experience, self‑assertion, identity, and notions of home, home‑going, and belonging. Visual artists inspired by the Négritude philosophy created works based on the same themes.

Négritude inspired the birth of many movements across the Afro-Diasporic world, including Afro-Surrealism, Créolité and Antillanité in the Caribbean, and black is beautiful in the United States. Frantz Fanon often made reference to Négritude in his writing.

== Etymology ==
Négritude is a constructed noun from the 1930s based upon the French word nègre, which, like its English counterpart, was derogatory and had a different meaning from "black man". The movement's use of the word Négritude was a way of re-imagining the word as an emic form of empowerment. The term was first used in its present sense by Aimé Césaire, in the third issue (May–June 1935) of L'Étudiant noir, a magazine that he had started in Paris with fellow students Léopold Senghor and Léon Damas, as well as Gilbert Gratiant, Leonard Sainville, Louis T. Achille, Aristide Maugée, and Paulette Nardal.

The word appears in Césaire's first published work, "Conscience Raciale et Révolution Sociale", with the heading "Les Idées" and the rubric "Négreries", which is notable for its disavowal of assimilation as a valid strategy for resistance and for its use of the word nègre as a positive term. The problem with assimilation was that one assimilated into a culture that considered African culture to be barbaric and unworthy of being seen as "civilized".

The assimilation into this culture would have been seen as an implicit acceptance of this view. Nègre previously had been used mainly in a pejorative sense. Césaire deliberately incorporated this derogatory word into the name of his philosophy. Césaire's choice of the -itude suffix has been criticized, with Senghor noting that "the term négritude has often been contested as a word before being contested as a concept", but the suffix allows Césaire to trope the vocabulary of racist science.

== Influences ==
Haitian anthropologist Anténor Firmin published an early work, De l'égalité des races humaines (On the Equality of Human Races), in 1885 as a rebuttal to French writer Count Arthur de Gobineau's Essai sur l'inégalité des Races Humaines (An Essay on the Inequality of the Human Races). Firmin influenced Jean Price-Mars, the initiator of Haitian ethnology and developer of the concept of Indigenism, and 20th-century American anthropologist Melville Herskovits. Black intellectuals have historically been proud of Haiti due to its slave revolution commanded by Toussaint Louverture during the 1790s. Césaire spoke, thus, of Haiti as being "where négritude stood up for the first time".

The Harlem Renaissance, a literary style developed in Harlem in Manhattan during the 1920s and 1930s, influenced the Négritude philosophy. The Harlem Renaissance's writers, including Langston Hughes, Richard Wright, Claude McKay, Alain Locke and W.E.B. Du Bois addressed the themes of "noireism", race relations and "double-consciousness".

During the 1920s and 1930s, young black students and scholars primarily from France's colonies and territories assembled in Paris, where they were introduced to writers of the Harlem Renaissance, namely Langston Hughes and Claude McKay, by Paulette Nardal and her sister Jane. The Nardal sisters wrote on Négritude and ran the Clamart Salon, a tea room patronized by Afro-French intellectuals where Négritude was debated and the concept for La Revue du Monde Noir took shape.

Paulette Nardal and the Haitian Dr. Leo Sajou initiated La Revue du Monde Noir (1931–32), a literary journal published in English and French, which attempted to appeal to African and Caribbean intellectuals in Paris. This Harlem inspiration was shared by the parallel development of negrismo and acceptance of "double-apparantence", double-consciousness, in the Spanish-speaking Caribbean region.

The Nardal sisters were responsible for the introduction of the Harlem Renaissance and its ideas to Césaire, Senghor, and Damas. In a letter from February 1960, Senghor admits the importance of the Nardal sisters, "We were in contact with these black Americans during the years 1929–34 through Mademoiselle Paulette Nardall...kept a literary salon where African Negroestrans, West Indians, and American Negroes used to get together." Jane Nardal's 1929 article "Internationalisme noir" predates Senghor's first critical theory piece "What the Black Man Contributes", itself published in 1939.

This essay, "Internationalisme noir", focuses on race consciousness in the African diaspora and cultural metissage, double-apparentance; seen as the philosophical foundation for the Négritude movement.

The Nardal sisters, for all their ideas and the importance of their Clamart Salon, have been minimized in the development of Négritude by the masculinist domination of the movement. Paulette even wrote as much in 1960 when she "bitterly complained" about the lack of acknowledgment to her and her sister Jane regarding their importance to a movement historically and presently credited to Césaire, Senghor, and Damas. The name Nardal belongs in that list.

== Négritude Literary Movement ==
=== Overview ===
Each of the initiators had his own ideas about the purpose and styles of Négritude, the philosophy was characterized generally by opposition to colonialism, denunciation of Europe's inhumanity, and rejection of Western domination and ideas. The movement showed Heideggerian influence in pursuing black people's "being-in-the-world" and insisting that black individuals possessed a history and a worthy culture standing equal to those of other countries. Also important was the acceptance of and pride in being black and a celebration of African history, traditions, and beliefs. Their literary style was surrealistic and they cherished Marxist ideas.

Motivation for the Négritude movement was a result of Aimé Césaire's, Leopold Senghor's, and Leon Damas's dissatisfaction, disgust, and personal conflict over the state of the Afro-French experience in France. All three shared a personal sense of revolt for the racism and colonial injustices that plagued their world and their French education. Senghor refused to believe that the purpose of his education was "to build Christianity and civilization in his soul where there was only paganism and barbarism before".

Césaire's disgust came as embarrassment when he was accused by some of the people of the Caribbean as having nothing to do with the people of Africa—whom they saw as savages. They separated themselves from Africa and proclaimed themselves as civilized. He denounced the writers from the Caribbean as "intellectually... corrupt and literarily nourished with white decadence". Damas believed this because of the pride these writers would take when a white person could read their whole book and would not be able to tell the author's complexion.

=== Literary Writers ===
==== Aimé Césaire ====
Césaire was a poet, playwright, and politician from Martinique. He studied in Paris, where he discovered the black community and "rediscovered Africa". He saw Négritude as the fact of being black, acceptance of this fact, and appreciation of the history and culture, and of black people. For Césaire, this emphasis on the acceptance of the fact of "blackness" was the means by which the "decolonization of the mind" could be achieved. According to him, western imperialism was responsible for the inferiority complex of black people. He sought to recognize the collective colonial experience of black individuals —the slave trade and plantation system. Césaire's ideology was especially important during the early years of Négritude.

Neither Césaire—who after returning to Martinique after his studies was elected mayor of Fort de France, the capital, and a representative of Martinique in France's Parliament—nor Senghor in Senegal, envisaged political independence from France. Césaire called for France's political assimilation of Martinique with the Loi de départementalisation (the Departmentalization Law), which did not entail an abandonment of Martinique's distinct culture.

==== Leopold Senghor ====
Négritude would, according to Senghor, enable black people in French lands to have a "seat at the give and take of the [French] table as equals". The French eventually granted Senegal and its other African colonies independence. Poet and later the first president of Sénégal, Senghor used Négritude to work toward a universal valuation of African people. He advocated a modern incorporation of the expression and celebration of traditional African customs and ideas. This interpretation of Négritude tended to be the most common, particularly during later years.

==== Leon Damas ====
Damas was a French Guianese poet and National Assembly member. He forcefully defended "black qualities" and rejected reconciliation with Caucasians. Two particular anthologies were pivotal to the movement; one was published by Damas in 1946, Poètes d'expression française 1900–1945. Senghor would then go on to publish Anthologie de la nouvelle poésie nègre et malgache de langue française in 1948.

Damas's introduction to the work and the poetic anthology was meant to be a sort of manifesto for the movement, but Senghor's own anthology eventually took that role. Though it would be the "Preface" written by French philosopher and public intellectual Jean-Paul Sartre for the anthology that would propel Négritude into the broader intellectual conversation.

Damas' introduction was more political and cultural in nature. A distinctive feature of his anthology and beliefs was that Damas felt his message was one for the colonized in general, and included poets from Indochina and Madagascar. This is sharply in contrast to Senghor's anthology. In the introduction, Damas proclaimed that now was the age where "the colonized man becomes aware of his rights and of his duties as a writer, as a novelist or a storyteller, an essayist or a poet."

Damas outlines the themes of the work. Damas states, "Poverty, illiteracy, exploitation of man by man, social and political racism suffered by the black or the yellow, forced labor, inequalities, lies, resignation, swindles, prejudices, complacencies, cowardice, failure, crimes committed in the name of liberty, of equality, of fraternity, that is the theme of this indigenous poetry in French." This introduction asserted a specific cultural identity.

== Négritude Art Movement ==
=== Overview ===
The Négritude art movement started in Paris. Négritude artists took the training from their Western art schools and then applied the philosophy of Négritude in their art.The Dakar School art movement in Senegal, active from 1960 to 1974, was directly influenced by the philosophy of Négritude, and was also founded under the paternalism of Senegalese President Léopold Sédar Senghor. The School of Fine Arts was created to further define and shape the visual movement of the Négritude philosophy.The Négritude art movement was used as a promotion of African culture and ideas into Western modernity, to break out of the biases set against African art.

=== Visual Artists ===
- Papa Ibra Tall.
- Ben Enwonwu.
- Wifredo Lam.

== Reception ==
In 1948, Jean-Paul Sartre analyzed the Négritude philosophy in an essay called "Orphée Noir" ("Black Orpheus") that served as the introduction to a volume of francophone poetry named Anthologie de la nouvelle poésie nègre et malgache, compiled by Léopold Senghor. In this essay, Sartre characterizes négritude as the opposite of colonial racism in a Hegelian dialectic and with it he helped to introduce Négritude issues to French intellectuals. In his opinion, négritude was an "anti-racist racism" (racisme antiraciste), a strategy with a final goal of racial unity.

Négritude was criticized by some Black writers during the 1960s as insufficiently militant. Keorapetse Kgositsile said that the term Négritude was based too much on Blackness according to a European aesthetic, and was unable to define a new kind of perception of African-ness that would free Black people and Black art from Caucasian conceptualizations altogether.

The Nigerian dramatist, poet, and novelists Chinua Achebe and Wole Soyinka opposed Négritude. They believed that by deliberately and outspokenly being proud of their ethnicity, Black people were automatically on the defensive. Wole Soyinka wrote: "A tiger doesn't proclaim its tigerness; it jumps on its prey." Soyinka in turn wrote in a 1960 essay for the Horn, "the duiker will not paint 'duiker' on his beautiful back to proclaim his duikeritude; you'll know him by his elegant leap."

After a long period of silence there has been a renaissance of Négritude developed by scholars such as Souleymane Bachir Diagne (Columbia University), Donna Jones (University of California, Berkeley), and Cheikh Thiam (Ohio State University) who all continue the work of Abiola Irele (1936–2017). Cheikh Thiam's book is the only book-length study of Négritude as philosophy. It develops Diagne's reading of Négritude as a philosophy of art, and Jones' presentation of Négritude as a lebensphilosophie.

== Additional Information ==
American physician Benjamin Rush, a signer of the United States Declaration of Independence and early abolitionist, is often said to have used the term "Negritude" to imagine a rhetorical "disease" that he said was a mild form of leprosy, the only cure for which was to become white. But this attribution has been disputed as a misreading of secondary sources. If there was such use, it might not have been known by the Afro-Francophones who developed the philosophy of Négritude during the 20th century. Still, Léopold Sédar Senghor did claim that he and Aimé Césaire were aware of discourse surrounding race and revolution from the US.

Novelist Norman Mailer used the term to describe boxer George Foreman's physical and psychological presence in his book The Fight, a journalistic treatment of the legendary Ali vs. Foreman "Rumble in the Jungle" bout in Kinshasa, Zaire (now Democratic Republic of the Congo) in October 1974.

"Négritude" or negritude can also be described as a phenomenal register of the sociosymbolic qualities that necessitate thingification, specifically at the advent of the Atlantic slave trade migrations; popularizing the condition of having phenotypical ‘negroid’ features, possessing the socioeconomic status as caste, and being fluent in black linguistic vernaculars.

The word is also used by the rapper Youssoupha in his eponymous album "Négritude."

== See also ==
- Black Skin, White Masks
- Black Consciousness Movement
- Black Surrealism
- Black Arts Movement
- Black Power Movement
- Angolanidade ("Angolan-ness")
- Authenticité
- Afro-pessimism
- Afro-Surrealism

== Bibliography ==
Original texts

- Césaire, Aimé: Return to My Native Land, Bloodaxe Books, 1997, ISBN 1-85224-184-5
- Césaire, Aimé: Discourse on Colonialism, Monthly Review Press (1950), 2000, ISBN 1-58367-025-4
- Damas, Léon-Gontran, Poètes d'expression française.Paris: Editions du Seuil, 1947
- Damas, Léon-Gontan, Mine de Rien, Poèmes inédits.
- Diop, Birago, Leurres et lueurs. Paris: Présence Africaine, 1960
- Senghor, Léopold Sedar, The Collected Poetry, University of Virginia Press, 1998
- Senghor, Léopold Sédar, Ce que je crois. Paris: Grasset, 1988
- Tadjo, Véronique, Red Earth/Latérite. Spokane, Washington: Eastern Washington University Press, 2006

Secondary literature

- Filostrat, Christian. Negritude Agonistes, Africana Homestead Legacy Publishers, 2008, ISBN 978-0-9818939-2-1
- Irele, Abiola. "Négritude or black cultural nationalism." Journal of Modern African Studies 3.3 (1965): 321–348.
- Le Baron, Bentley. "Négritude: A Pan-African Ideal?." Ethics 76.4 (1966): 267–276 online.
- Reilly, Brian J. "Négritude's Contretemps: The Coining and Reception of Aimé Césaire's Neologism". Philological Quarterly 99.4 (2020): 377–98.
- Rexer, Raisa. "Black and White and Re(a)d All Over: L'Étudiant noir, Communism, and the Birth of Négritude". Research in African Literatures 44.4 (2013): 1–14.
- Sharpley-Whiting, T. Denean. Negritude Women, University of Minnesota Press, 2002, ISBN 0-8166-3680-X
- Stovall, Tyler, "Aimé Césaire and the making of black Paris." French Politics, Culture & Society 27#3 (2009): 44–46
- Thiam, Cheikh. Return to the Kingdom of Childhood: Re-envisioning the Legacy and Philosophical Relevance of Negritude (Ohio State University Press, 2014)
- Thiam, Cheikh. Negritude, Modernity, and the Idea of Africa (Routledge, 2024)
- Thompson, Peter, Negritude and Changing Africa: An Update, in Research in African Literatures, Winter 2002
- Thompson, Peter, Négritude et nouveaux mondes—poésie noire: africaine, antillaise et malgache. Concord, Mass: Wayside Publishing, 1994
- Wilder, Gary. The French Imperial Nation-State: Negritude & Colonial Humanism Between the Two World Wars (University of Chicago Press, 2005) ISBN 0-226-89772-9
- Wilder, Gary. Freedom time: Negritude, decolonization, and the future of the world (Duke University Press, 2015).
- Kemi Séba, Supra-négritude, Fiat-Lux éditions 2013, ISBN 979-1091157018

== Filmography ==
- Négritude: Naissance et expansion du concept a documentary by Nathalie Fave and Jean-Baptiste Fave, first minutes online, with the interventions of Amadou Lamine Sall, Racine Senghor, Lylian Kesteloot, Jean-Louis Roy, Jacqueline Lemoine, Gérard Chenêt, Victor Emmanuel Cabrita, Nafissatou Dia Diouf, Amadou Ly, Youssoufa Bâ, Raphaël Ndiaye, Alioune Badara Bèye, Hamidou Dia, Georges Courrèges, Baba Diop; Maison Africaine de la Poésie Internationale. Shot in Sénégal in 2005, 56' (DVD)
