= René Ménil =

Martiniquais writer (1907–2004)

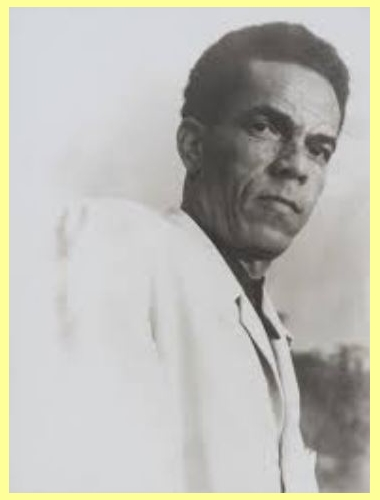
René Ménil

René Ménil (1907, Gros-Morne, Martinique – 29 August 2004, Sainte-Luce, Martinique) was a French surrealist writer and philosopher who lived on the island of Martinique.

== Biography ==
Born and raised on the island of Martinique, Ménil was one of several of the island's natives who studied in France and returned to influence the independence movement with the ideas of Marxism, and Surrealism. He was involved in helping to publish a literary journal in 1932 with Étienne Léro called Légitime Défense. He also began the Antillanité movement.

In the early 1940s Ménil started a journal called Tropiques along with other notable Martinique writers such as Suzanne Césaire and Aimé Césaire. The publication spoke very strongly against French colonialism in its essays. To avoid retaliation from their powerful critics, they portrayed the magazine as a journal of West Indian folklore.

A professor and writer throughout his life, in 1981 Ménil published a book of essays entitled Tracées (ISBN 978-22-2100-633-7).
