= Perfecto =

Perfecto may refer to:

== People ==
=== Given name ===
- Perfecto de Castro ("Perf"), Filipino musician
- Perfecto Yasay Jr. (1947–2020), Filipino bureaucrat and former Secretary of Foreign Affairs

=== Surname ===
- Gregorio Perfecto (1891–1949), Filipino journalist, politician and jurist
- Mariano Perfecto (1853–1913), Filipino politician, writer, and father of Gregorio Perfecto
- Martín Perfecto de Cos (1800–1854), 19th-century Mexican general

=== Single name ===
- Saint Perfecto (died 850), Spanish saint; one of the Martyrs of Córdobaa
- Perfecto (gamer), Russian esports player Ilya Zalutskiy

== Entertainment ==
- Perfecto, the 1990s remix team consisting of Paul Oakenfold of Perfecto Records and others
- Perfecto Records, a British record label founded by trance DJ Paul Oakenfold in 1989
- Planet Perfecto, a dance "supergroup" formed in 1997 by Paul Oakenfold, Ian Masterson and Jake Williams

== Other uses ==
- Gregorio Perfecto High School, a high school in Juan Luna, Tondo, Philippines
- Perfecto, a shape or type of cigar
- Perfecto motorcycle jacket, a brand of double style leather motorcycle jackets manufactured by American clothing company Schott NYC
- Perfecto Technologies, an applications security company, later renamed to Sanctum
- St. Louis Perfectos (1899), a former name for the St. Louis Cardinals
- USS Perfecto (SP-86), a patrol boat in the United States Navy during World War I

== See also ==
- Perfecta (disambiguation)
- Perfetto, a Spanish-language album by Eros Ramazzotti
