= 1891 =

1891 in various calendars
- Gregorian calendar: 1891; MDCCCXCI
- Ab urbe condita: 2644
- Armenian calendar: 1340; ԹՎ ՌՅԽ
- Assyrian calendar: 6641
- Baháʼí calendar: 47–48
- Balinese saka calendar: 1812–1813
- Bengali calendar: 1297–1298
- Berber calendar: 2841
- British Regnal year: 54 Vict. 1 – 55 Vict. 1
- Buddhist calendar: 2435
- Burmese calendar: 1253
- Byzantine calendar: 7399–7400
- Chinese calendar: 庚寅年 (Metal Tiger); 4588 or 4381 — to — 辛卯年 (Metal Rabbit); 4589 or 4382
- Coptic calendar: 1607–1608
- Discordian calendar: 3057
- Ethiopian calendar: 1883–1884
- Hebrew calendar: 5651–5652
- Hindu calendars
- Vikram Samvat: 1947–1948
- Shaka Samvat: 1812–1813
- Kali Yuga: 4991–4992
- Holocene calendar: 11891
- Igbo calendar: 891–892
- Iranian calendar: 1269–1270
- Islamic calendar: 1308–1309
- Japanese calendar: Meiji 24 (明治２４年)
- Javanese calendar: 1820–1821
- Julian calendar: Gregorian minus 12 days
- Korean calendar: 4224
- Minguo calendar: 21 before ROC 民前21年
- Nanakshahi calendar: 423
- Thai solar calendar: 2433–2434
- Tibetan calendar: ལྕགས་ཕོ་སྟག་ལོ་ (male Iron-Tiger); 2017 or 1636 or 864 — to — ལྕགས་མོ་ཡོས་ལོ་ (female Iron-Hare); 2018 or 1637 or 865

1891 (MDCCCXCI) was a common year starting on Thursday of the Gregorian calendar and a common year starting on Tuesday of the Julian calendar, the 1891st year of the Common Era (CE) and Anno Domini (AD) designations, the 891st year of the 2nd millennium, the 91st year of the 19th century, and the 2nd year of the 1890s decade. As of the start of 1891, the Gregorian calendar was 12 days ahead of the Julian calendar, which remained in localized use until 1923.

== Events ==
=== January ===
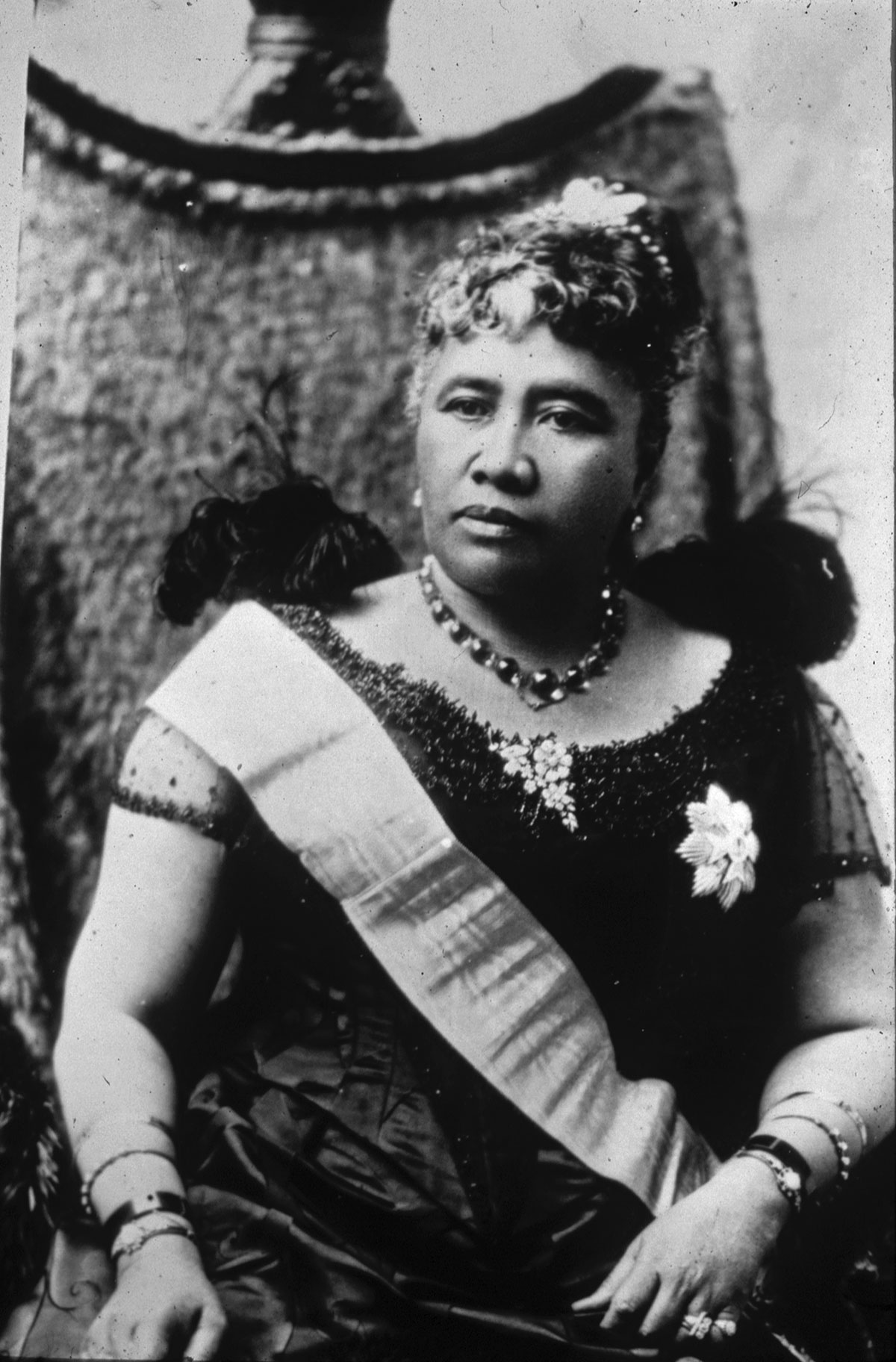
January 21: Hawaii, Queen Lili'Uokalani.

- January 1
  - A strike of 500 Hungarian steel workers occurs; 3,000 men are out of work as a consequence.
  - Germany takes formal possession of its new African territories.
- January 4 – The Earl of Zetland issues a declaration regarding the famine in the western counties of Ireland.
- January 5
  - The Australian shearers' strike, that leads indirectly to the foundation of the Australian Labor Party, begins.
  - A fight between the United States and Lakota people breaks out near Pine Ridge agency.
  - A fight between railway strikers and police breaks out at Motherwell, Scotland.
- January 7
  - General Nelson A. Miles' forces surround the Lakota in the Pine Ridge Reservation.
  - The Inter-American Monetary Commission meets in Washington, D.C.
- January 9 – The great shoe strike in Rochester, New York is called off.
- January 10 – In France, the Irish Nationalist leaders hold a conference at Boulogne. The French government promptly takes loan.
- January 11
  - 3,000 Lakotas approach Pine Ridge with a view to surrender.
  - In Mahoning Valley, Ohio, sixteen blast furnaces shut down, putting 10,000 men out of work.
- January 12
  - Canada brings suit before the United States Supreme Court in re seizures of vessels in the Bering Sea.
  - St. Mary's Cathedral is dedicated in San Francisco.
- January 14 – Conference of Lakota chiefs with General Miles at Pine Ridge Reservation: the Lakota agree to surrender.
- January 15 – Scottish railway strikers attempt to wreck a train near Greenock, Scotland.
- January 16 – The Chilean Civil War of 1891 breaks out.
- January 19
  - General Miles officially announces the end of the native outbreak and congratulates his troops.
  - A British Royal Navy squadron is ordered to Chile.
- January 20 – Jim Hogg becomes the first native Texan to be governor of that state.
- January 27–May 2 – The Jamaica International Exhibition is held.
- January 29 – Liliuokalani is proclaimed Queen of Hawaii.
- January 31 – The Portuguese republican revolution breaks out, in the northern city of Porto.

=== February ===
- February 14 – In the FA Cup quarter-final in English association football, a goal is deliberately stopped by handball on the goal line. An indirect free kick is awarded, since the penalty kick, proposed the previous year by William McCrum, has not yet been implemented. This event probably changes public opinion on the penalty kick, seen previously as an Irishman's motion.
- February 15 – Allmänna Idrottsklubben (AIK) sports club is founded in Stockholm, Sweden.
- February 21 – Springhill, Nova Scotia suffers a serious mining disaster.
- February 24 – The constitution of the First Brazilian Republic is promulgated.
- February – The Tobacco Protest begins in Iran.

=== March ===
- March 3 – The International Copyright Act of 1891 is passed, by the 51st United States Congress.
- March 5 – 1st Prime Minister of Canada Sir John A. Macdonald wins a 4th consecutive parliamentary victory over the Liberal Party.
- March 9–12 – The Great Blizzard of 1891 in the south and west of England leads to extensive snow drifts and powerful storms off the south coast, with 14 ships sunk, and approximately 220 deaths attributed to the weather conditions.
- March 12 – Djurgårdens IF (DIF) sports club is founded in Stockholm.
- March 14 – In New Orleans, a lynch mob storms the Old Parish Prison, and lynches 11 Italians arrested but found innocent of the murder of Police Chief David Hennessy.
- March 17 – The British steamship SS Utopia, carrying Italian migrants to New York, sinks in the inner harbor of Gibraltar after collision with the battleship HMS Anson, killing 564.
- March 18 – The London–Paris telephone system officially opens.

=== April ===
- April 1
  - The Wrigley Company is founded in Chicago.
  - The London–Paris telephone system is opened to the general public.
- April 5 – Census in the United Kingdom: 15.6 million people live in cities of 20,000 or more in England and Wales, and cities of 20,000 or more account for 54% of the total English population.
- April 12 – The first official game in the Association football league of Argentina (1891 Argentine Primera División) is held in Caballito, Buenos Aires.
- April 23 – Chilean Civil War of 1891: Chilean ironclad Blanco Encalada is sunk at the Battle of Caldera Bay by torpedo boats. This is the first ironclad warship lost to a self-propelled torpedo.

=== May ===
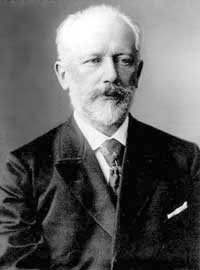
May 5: Tchaikovsky opens Carnegie Hall

- May 1
  - Troops fire on a workers' May Day demonstration in support of the 8-hour workday in Fourmies, France, killing 9 and wounding 30.
  - The first Fascio dei lavoratori (Workers League) is founded by Giuseppe De Felice Giuffrida in Catania, Sicily.
- May 5 – The Music Hall in New York (later known as Carnegie Hall) has its grand opening and first public performance, with Tchaikovsky as guest conductor.
- May 11 – Ōtsu incident: Tsesarevich Nikolay Alexandrovich (the future Czar Nicholas II) of Russia survives an assassination attempt while visiting Japan.
- May 15 – Pope Leo XIII issues the encyclical Rerum novarum, on the rights and duties of capital and labor, resulting in the creation of many Christian Democrat parties throughout Europe.
- May 20 – Thomas Edison's prototype kinetoscope is first displayed at Edison's Laboratory, for a convention of the National Federation of Women's Clubs.
- May 31 N.S. (May 19 O.S.) – In the Kuperovskaya district of Vladivostok, a grand ceremonial inauguration of construction work on the Trans-Siberian Railway is carried out by the Tsesarevich Nikolay Alexandrovich, and a religious service held.
- May – Mirza Ghulam Ahmad claims to be the Promised Messiah (the second coming of Jesus) and the Mahdi awaited in Islam.

=== June ===
- June 1 – The Johnstown Inclined Plane opens in Johnstown, Pennsylvania.
- June 15 – Minas Gerais was granted in 1891.
- June 21 – The first long-distance transmission of alternating current is made, from the Ames power plant near Telluride, Colorado, by Lucien and Paul Nunn.
- June 25 – Arthur Conan Doyle's detective Sherlock Holmes appears in The Strand Magazine (London) for the first time, in the issue dated July.

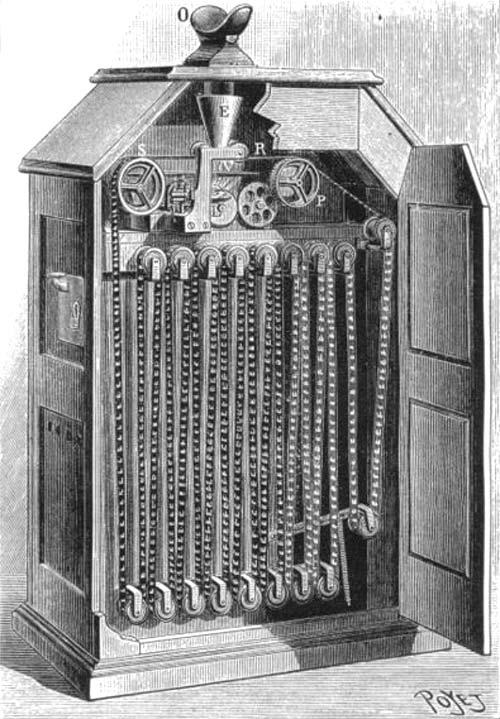
May 20: Edison's kinetoscope.

- June – The clipper ship Cromdale is completed. She is the last fully rigged ship built for the Australian wool trade.

=== July ===
- July 7 – The Home Alliance was established in Woodland, California where, initially, it was the only publication in the state that fought the legalized liquor traffic.
- July 30 – The Springboks rugby union team of South Africa play their first international test match against the Lions team of the British Isles, and lose by 4–0.

=== August ===
- August 5 – The first American Express traveler's cheque is cashed.
- August 27 – France and Russia conclude a defensive alliance.

=== September ===
- September 14 – The first penalty kick is awarded in an Association football match: John Heath scores it for Wolverhampton Wanderers in England.
- September 18 – The Chilean Civil War of 1891 ends with the suicide of deposed President José Manuel Balmaceda and victory for the Congressional party, beginning the country's Parliamentary Era.
- September 22 – The first hydropower plant of Finland is commissioned along the Tammerkoski rapids in Tampere, Pirkanmaa.
- September 28 – Club Atlético Peñarol is founded in Montevideo, under the name of the CURCC (Central Uruguay Railway Cricket Club).
- September 29 – Thyssen, predecessor of the Thyssen Krupp worldwide conglomerate, is founded in Duisburg, Germany.

=== October ===
- October 1
  - Stanford University in California opens its doors.
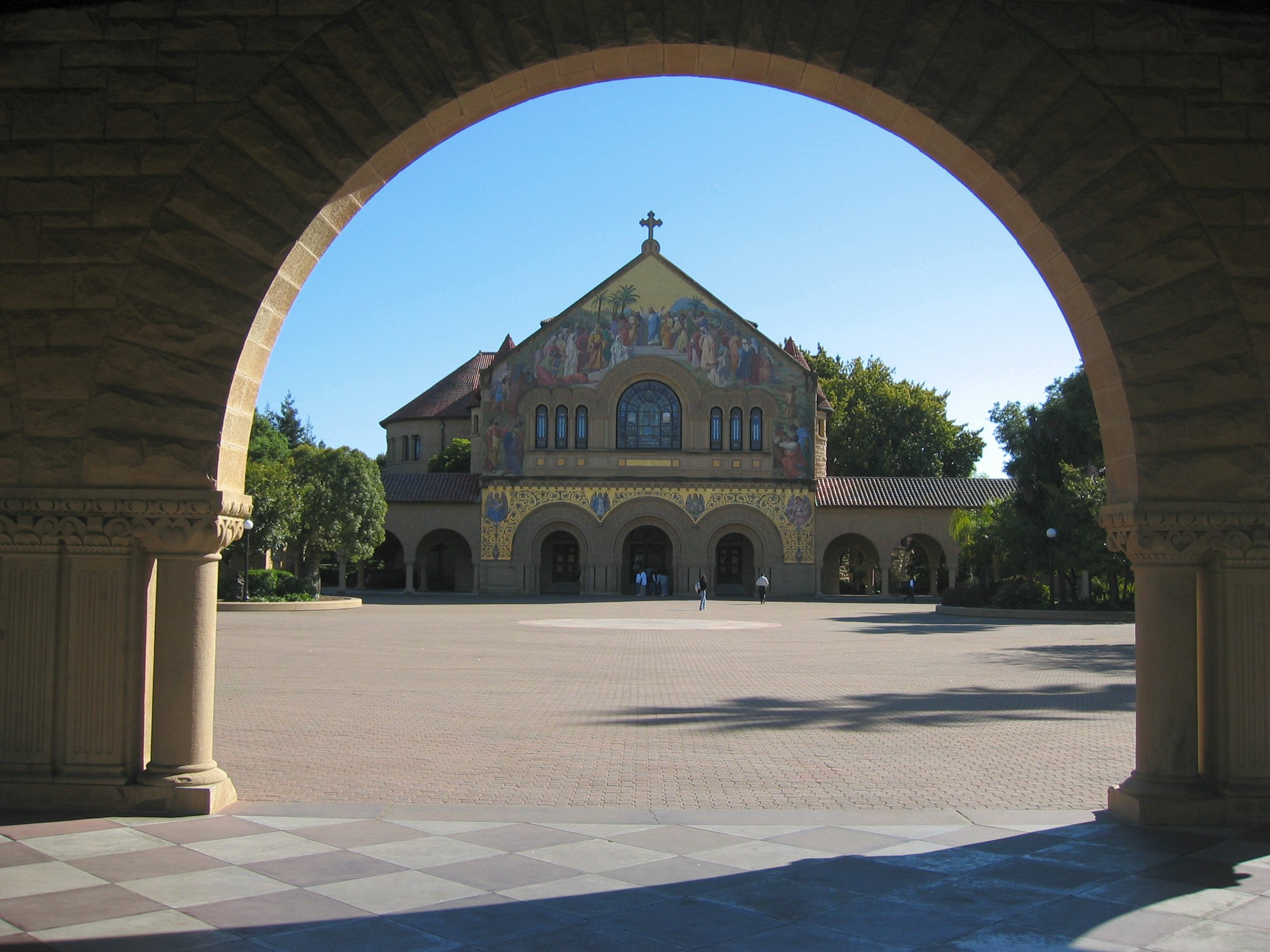
    October 1 Stanford University opens its doors.
  - Skansen is established as the world's first open-air museum by Artur Hazelius, on the island of Djurgården in Stockholm, Sweden.
- October 28 – The 8.0 M_{s} Mino–Owari earthquake strikes the Gifu region of Japan. This oblique-slip event kills over 7,200, injures more than 17,000, and creates fault scarps that still remain visible.
- October – Eugène Dubois finds the first fragmentary bones of Pithecanthropus erectus (later redesignated Homo erectus), or "Java Man", at Trinil on the Solo River.

=== November ===
- November 11 – Jindandao Incident: The Chinese Juu Uda League in Inner Mongolia massacres tens of thousands of Mongols, before being suppressed by government troops in late December.
- November 28 – The International Brotherhood of Electrical Workers is organized in St. Louis, Missouri.

=== December ===
- December 17 – Drexel University is inaugurated as the Drexel Institute of Art, Science and Industry in Philadelphia.
- December 22 – Asteroid 323 Brucia becomes the first asteroid discovered using photography.

=== Date unknown ===
- Brahmin teacher and nationalist Bal Gangadhar Tilak begins agitation for Indian Home Rule.
- James Naismith invents basketball in the United States.
- Seattle University is established as the Immaculate Conception school.
- Nikola Tesla invents the Tesla coil.
- Michelin patents the removable pneumatic bicycle tire.
- Production of the Swiss Army Knife by Victorinox begins.
- Philips founded in Eindhoven, Netherlands, for the production of carbon-filament lamps and other electro-technical products.
- New Mexico Military Institute is founded (as Goss Military Institute) in Roswell, New Mexico Territory.
- A predecessor of the Japanese personal care brand Lion Corporation is founded as Kobayashi Tomijirō Shōten (小林富次郎商店).

== Births ==
=== January–March ===
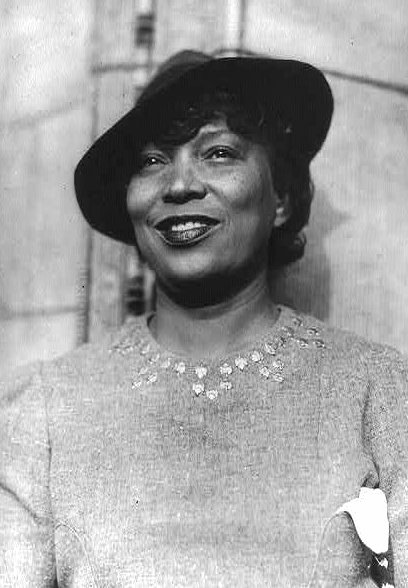
Zora Neale Hurston

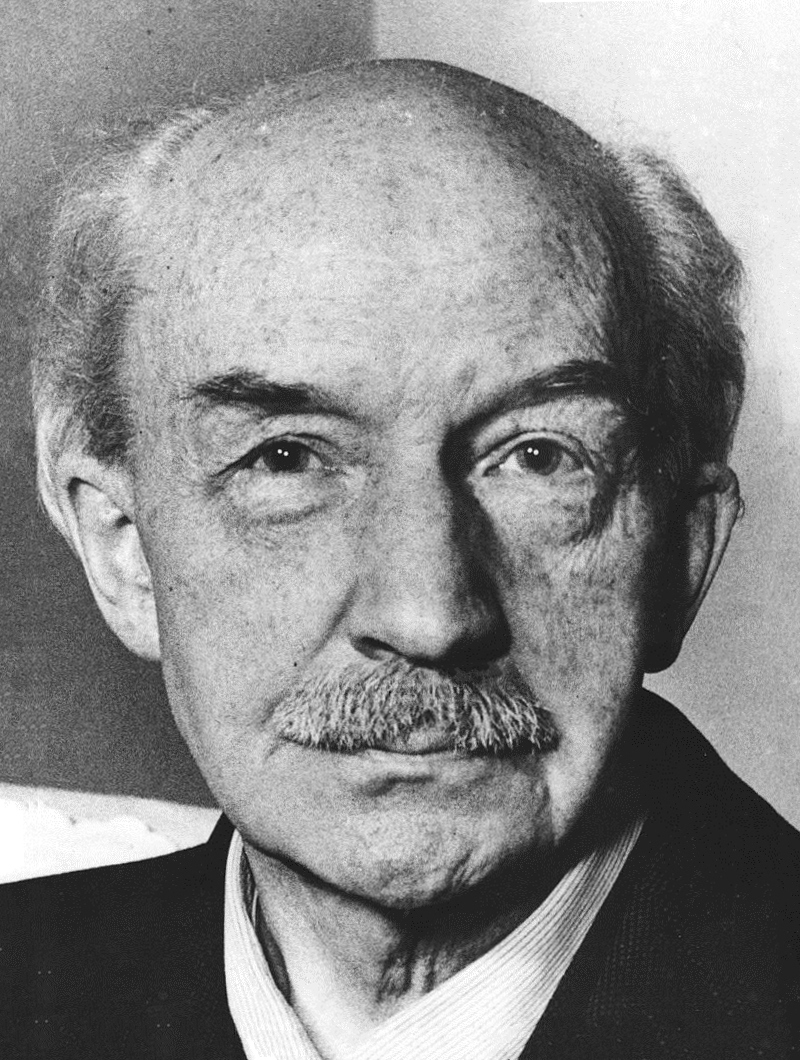
Walther Bothe

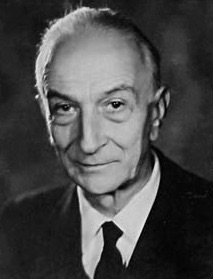
Antonio Segni

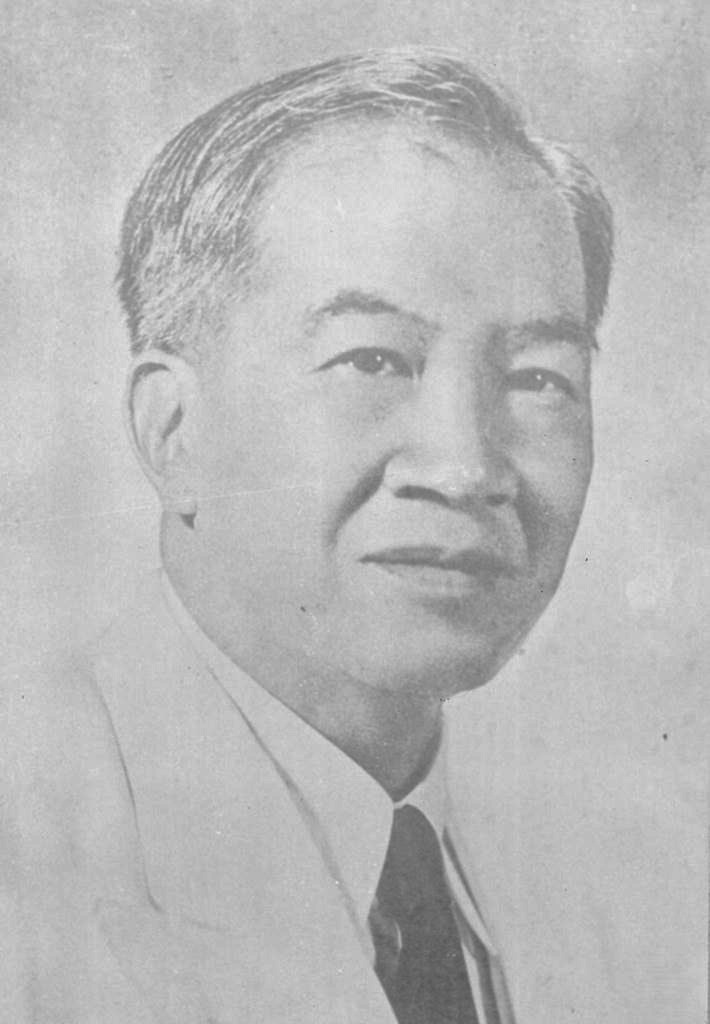
José P. Laurel

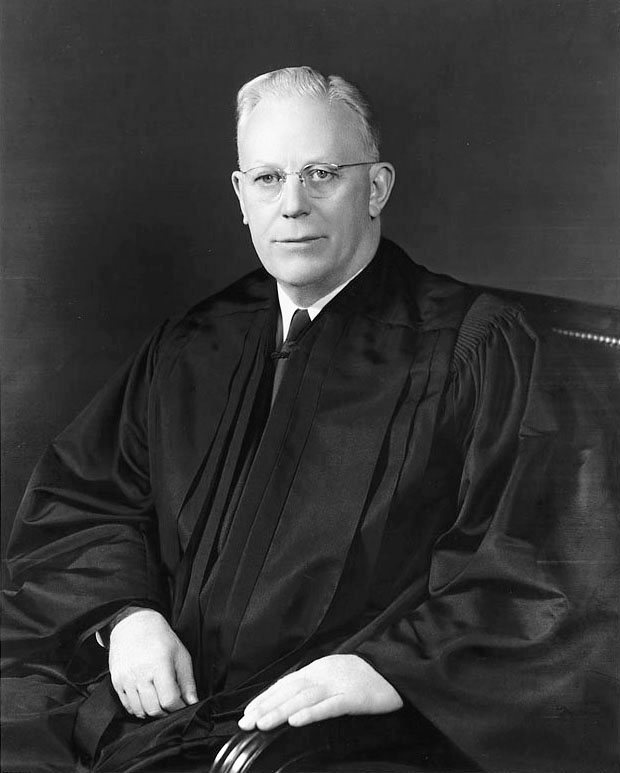
Earl Warren

- January 1 – Charles Bickford, American actor (d. 1967)
- January 7 – Zora Neale Hurston, African-American writer, anthropologist, ethnographer (d. 1960)
- January 8 – Walther Bothe, German physicist, Nobel Prize in Physics (d. 1957)
- January 13 – Miguel Pro, Mexican Jesuit priest, martyr and blessed (d. 1927)
- January 15 – Ray Chapman, American baseball player (d. 1920)
- January 22
  - Antonio Gramsci, Italian Communist writer, politician (d. 1937)
  - Bruno Loerzer, German aviator, air force general (d. 1960)
- January 23
  - Marjorie Maynard, British artist and farmer (died 1975)
  - Pavlo Tychyna, Ukrainian poet, translator, publicist, public activist, academician, and statesman. (d. 1967)
- January 24 – Walter Model, German field marshal (d. 1945)
- January 27 – Ilya Ehrenburg, Russian writer (d. 1967)
- February 1 – Shigeru Fukudome, Japanese admiral (d. 1971)
- February 2 – Antonio Segni, Italian politician, 34th Prime Minister of Italy (1955–1957, 1959–1960), 4th President of the Italian Republic (d. 1972)
- February 9 – Ronald Colman, English actor (d. 1958)
- February 13 – Grant Wood, American painter (d. 1942)
- February 17 – Abraham Fraenkel, German-born Israeli mathematician, recipient of the Israel Prize (d. 1965)
- February 21 – Seán Heuston, Irish rebel (d. 1916)
- February 27 – David Sarnoff, Russian-born American broadcasting pioneer (d. 1971)
- March 3 – Fritz Rumey, German World War I fighter ace (d. 1918)
- March 9 – José P. Laurel, 3rd President of the Philippines (d. 1959)
- March 10 – Sam Jaffe, American actor (d. 1984)
- March 16 – Patsy Gallacher, Irish footballer (d. 1953)
- March 19 – Earl Warren, American politician and Chief Justice of the United States (d. 1974)
- March 24 – Rudolf Berthold, German fighter pilot (d. 1920)
- March 29 – Yvan Goll, French lyricist, dramatist (d. 1950)

=== April–June ===
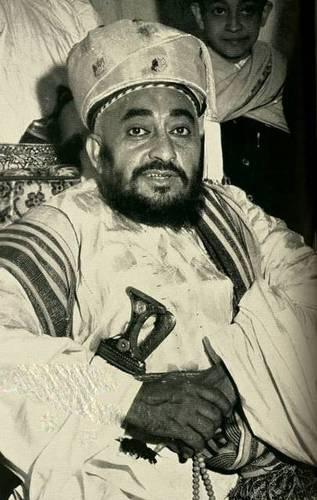
Ahmad bin Yahya

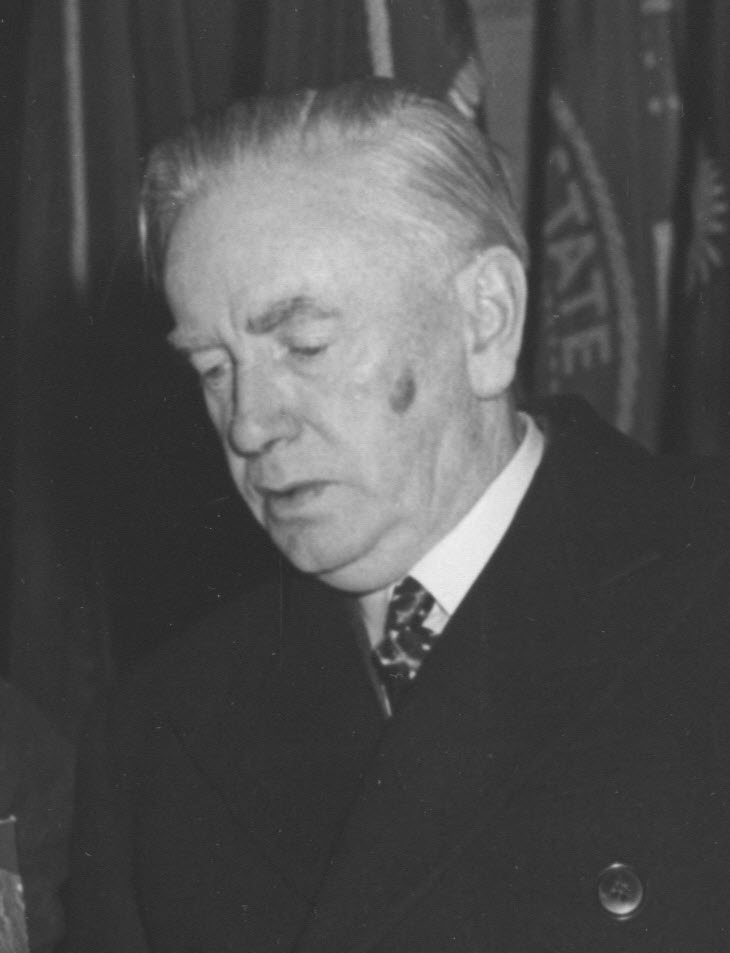
John A. Costello

- April 2 – Max Ernst, German painter (d. 1976)
- April 5 – Laura Vicuña, Chilean Roman Catholic holy figure and blessed (d. 1904)
- April 7
  - Ole Kirk Christiansen, Danish founder of The Lego Group (d. 1958)
  - Minoru Ōta, Japanese admiral (d. 1945)
- April 13 – Nella Larsen, American novelist (d. 1964)
- April 14 – B. R. Ambedkar, Indian jurist and politician (d. 1956)
- April 15 – Wallace Reid, American actor (d. 1923)
- April 17 – George Adamski, Polish-born alleged UFO traveler (d. 1965)
- April 23 – Sergei Prokofiev, Soviet composer (d. 1953)
- April 29 – Bharathidasan, Tamil poet and rationalist (d. 1964)
- May 10
  - Anton Dostler, German general (d. 1945)
  - Mahmoud Mokhtar, Egyptian sculptor (d. 1934)
- May 15
  - Mikhail Bulgakov, Russian writer (d. 1940)
  - Nipo T. Strongheart, Native American filmmaker (d. 1966)
- May 16
  - Richard Tauber, Austrian tenor (d. 1948)
  - Adolf Ritter von Tutschek, German fighter ace (d. 1918)
- May 18 – Rudolf Carnap, German philosopher (d. 1970)
- May 19 – Oswald Boelcke, German World War I fighter ace (d. 1916)
- May 23 – Pär Lagerkvist, Swedish writer, Nobel Prize laureate (d. 1974)
- May 24 – William F. Albright, American archeologist, Biblical scholar (d. 1971)
- June 2 – Takijirō Ōnishi, Japanese admiral (d. 1945)
- June 4 – Leopold Vietoris, Austrian mathematician (d. 2002)
- June 5 - Hélène Sparrow, Polish-French medical doctor and bacteriologist (d. 1970)
- June 9 – Cole Porter, American composer, songwriter (d. 1964)
- June 18 – Ahmad bin Yahya, King of Yemen (d. 1962)
- June 20 – John A. Costello, second Taoiseach of Ireland (d. 1976)
- June 21 – Hermann Scherchen, German conductor (d. 1966)
- June 24 – Devere Allen, American socialist, pacifist political activist, and journalist (d. 1955)
- June 28 – Carl Spaatz, American general (d. 1974)
- June 30 – Man Mountain Dean, American professional wrestler (d. 1953)

=== July–September ===
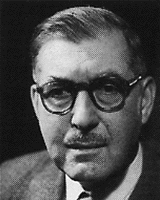
Karl Kobelt

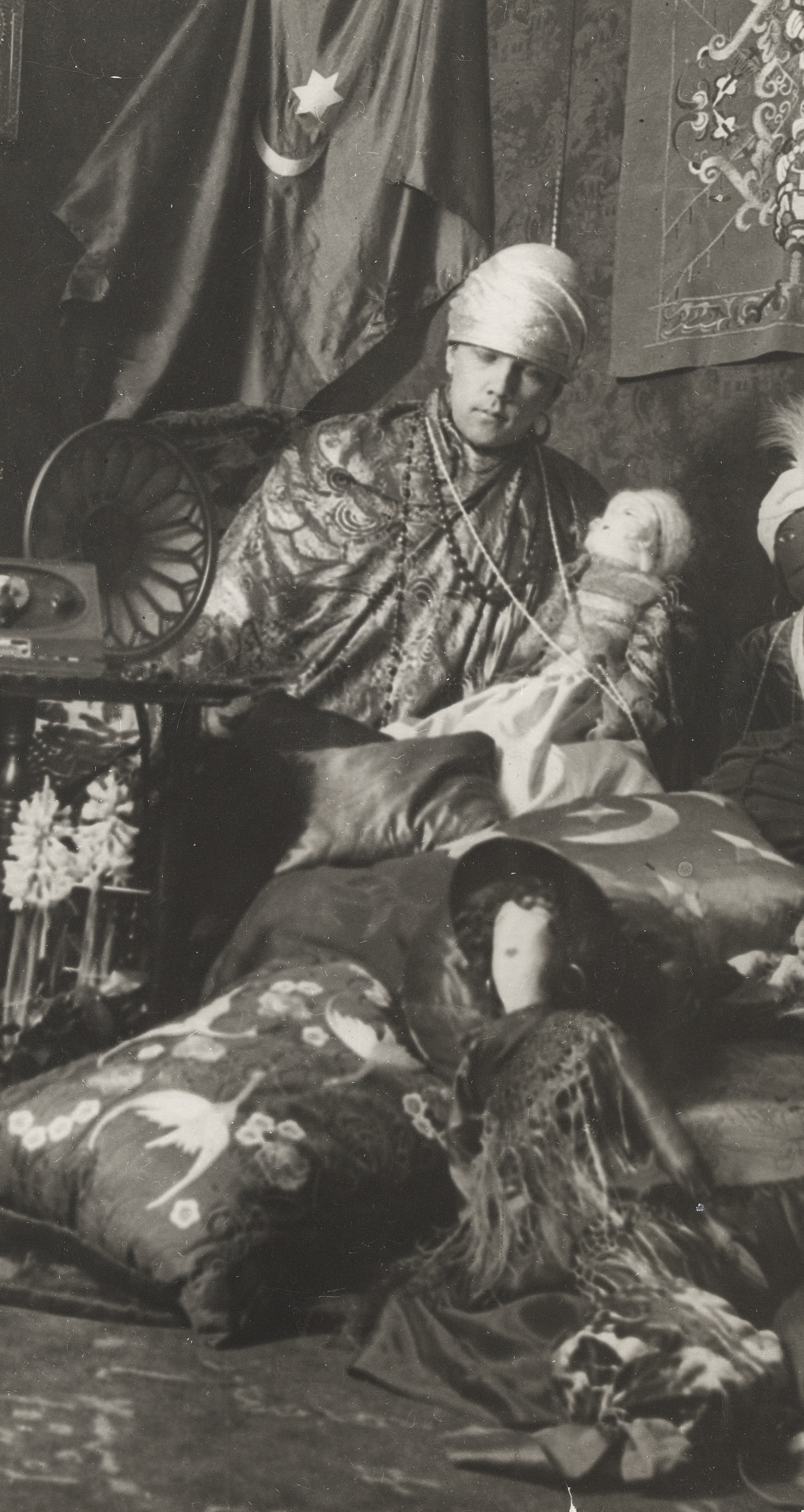
Madame Minna Craucher

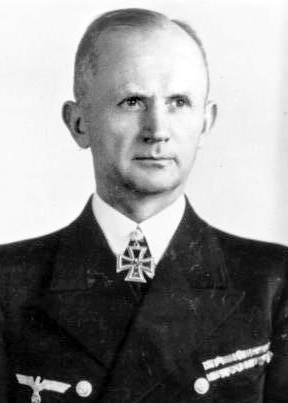
Karl Dönitz

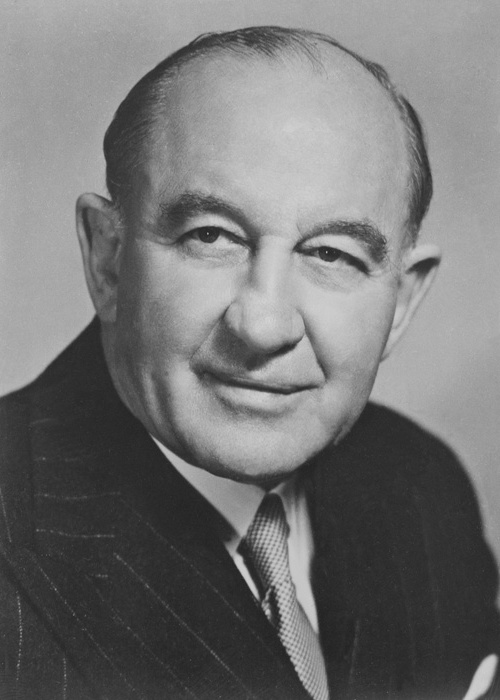
William McKell

- July 5 – John Howard Northrop, American chemist, Nobel Prize laureate (d. 1987)
- July 7 – Tadamichi Kuribayashi, Imperial Japanese Army general (d. 1945)
- July 12 – Jetta Goudal, Dutch-American actress (d. 1985)
- July 18 – Gene Lockhart, Canadian-American actor, singer, and playwright (d. 1957)
- July 21 – Elmer Ripley, American basketball coach (d. 1982)
- July 27 – Ruby McKim, American quilter (d. 1976)
- July 28 – Joe E. Brown, American actor, comedian (d. 1973)
- July 29 – Bernhard Zondek, German-born Israeli gynecologist, developer of first reliable pregnancy test (d. 1966)
- July 30 – Roderic Dallas, Australian World War I fighter ace (d. 1918)
- August 1 – Karl Kobelt, 2-time President of the Swiss Confederation (d. 1968)
- August 11 – Stancho Belkovski, Bulgarian architect, lecturer (d. 1962)
- August 13 – Ethel Roosevelt Derby, youngest daughter of Theodore Roosevelt (d. 1977)
- August 14 – Ralph Barton, American artist (d. 1931)
- August 17 – Dulcie Mary Pillers, English medical illustrator (d. 1961)
- August 21 – Emiliano Mercado del Toro, Puerto Rican supercentenarian, oldest war veteran ever and last surviving person born in 1891 (d. 2007)
- August 23 – Minna Craucher, Finnish socialite and spy (d. 1932)
- August 29 – Michael Chekhov, Russian-American actor, theatre director (d. 1955)
- September 12 – Pedro Albizu Campos, advocate of Puerto Rican independence (d. 1965)
- September 14 – William F. Friedman, American cryptographer (d. 1969)
- September 16
  - Teruo Akiyama, Japanese admiral (d. 1943)
  - Karl Dönitz, German admiral, briefly President of Germany (d. 1980)
  - Stephanie von Hohenlohe, Austrian-born German World War II spy (d. 1972)
- September 22 – Hans Albers, German actor, singer (d. 1960)
- September 22 – Alma Thomas, African-American painter (d. 1978)
- September 26
  - Charles Munch, French conductor, violinist (d. 1968)
  - William McKell, 12th Governor-General of Australia (d. 1985)

=== October–December ===
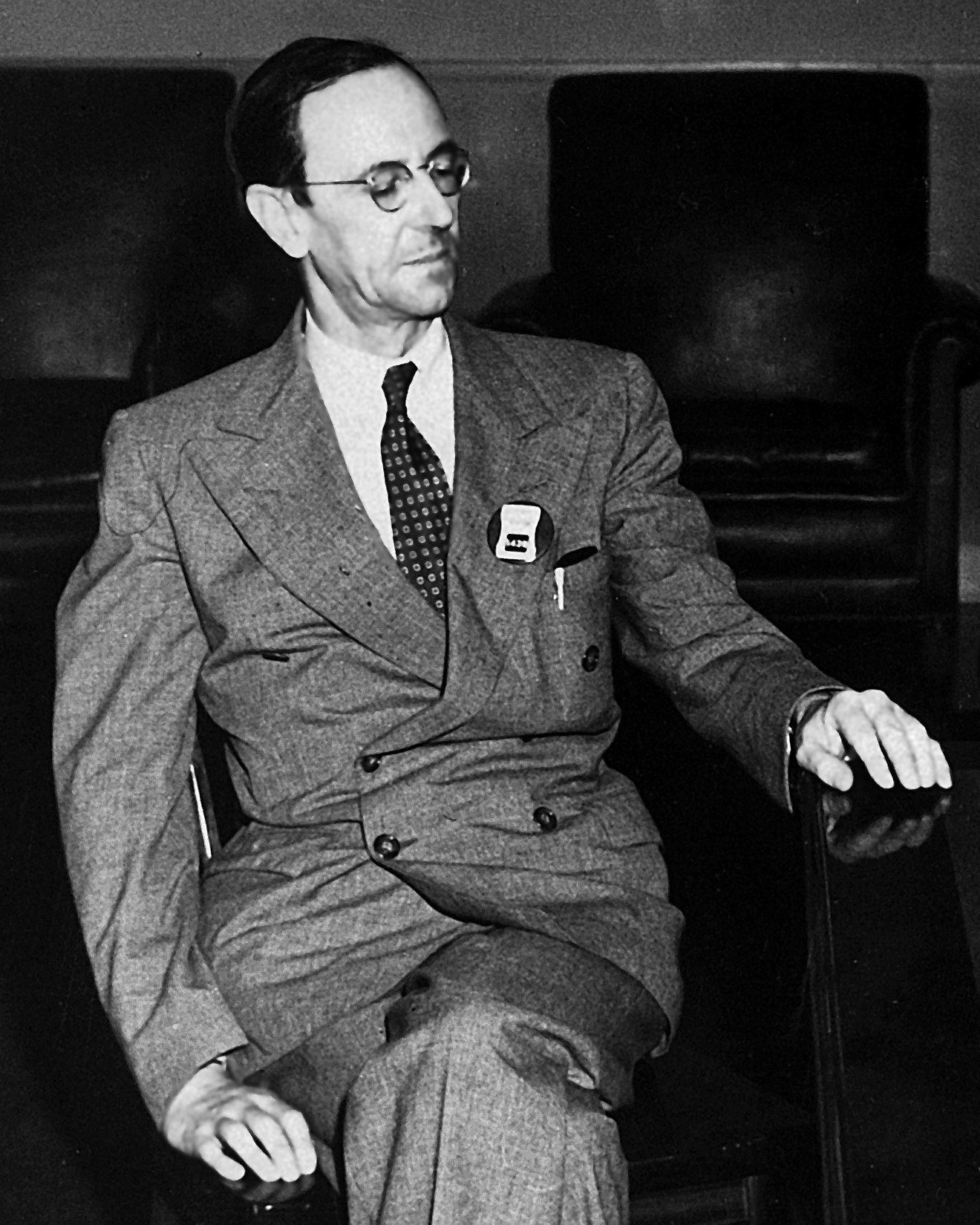
James Chadwick

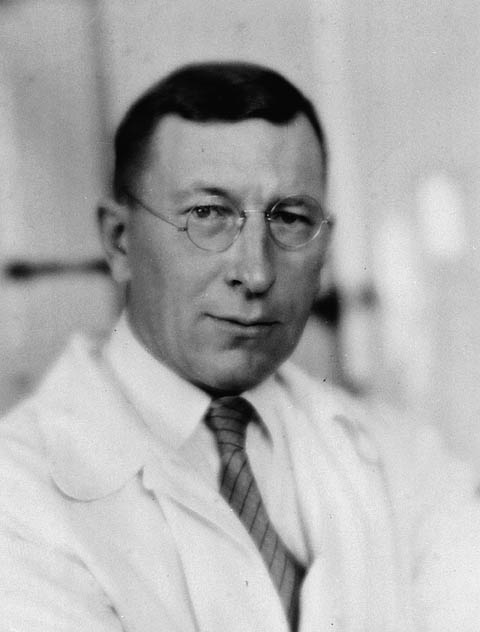
Frederick Banting

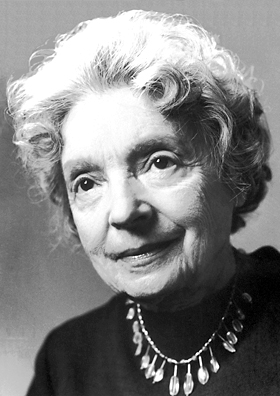
Nelly Sachs

Hu Shih

- October 12 – Fumimaro Konoe, Prime Minister of Japan (d. 1945)
- October 13 – Irene Rich, American actress (d. 1988)
- October 15 – Tadashige Daigo, Japanese admiral (d. 1947)
- October 20 – James Chadwick, English physicist, Nobel Prize laureate (d. 1974)
- October 24 – Rafael Trujillo, dictator of the Dominican Republic (d. 1961)
- October 25 – Charles Coughlin, American Catholic priest, anti-Semitic radio host (d. 1979)
- October 28 – Ormer Locklear, American stunt pilot, film actor (d. 1920)
- November 4 – Orlando Ward, American general (d. 1972)
- November 7
  - Miriam Cooper, American silent film actress (d. 1976)
  - Genrikh Yagoda, Soviet police and intelligence official (d. 1938)
- November 10 – Carl W. Stalling, American musician (d. 1972)
- November 12 – Władysław Bortnowski, Polish historian and general (d. 1966)
- November 14 – Frederick Banting, Canadian physician, recipient of the Nobel Prize in Physiology or Medicine (d. 1941)
- November 15
  - Vincent Astor, American philanthropist (d. 1959)
  - Erwin Rommel, German field marshal (d. 1944)
- November 19 – Juan Yagüe, Spanish general (d. 1952)
- November 24 – Mariano Ospina Pérez, Colombian politician, 17th President of Colombia (d. 1976)
- November 28 – Gregorio Perfecto, Filipino jurist, politician (d. 1949)
- November 29 – Julius Raab, Chancellor of Austria (d. 1964)
- December 4 – T. V. Soong, Taiwanese businessman, politician (d. 1971)
- December 6
  - Masatomi Kimura, Japanese admiral (d. 1960)
  - Gotthard Sachsenberg, German World War I naval aviator, fighter ace (d. 1961)
- December 9 – Maksim Bahdanovič, Belarusian poet (d. 1917)
- December 10
  - Harold Alexander, 1st Earl Alexander of Tunis, British field marshal (d. 1969)
  - Nelly Sachs, German writer, Nobel Prize laureate (d. 1970)
- December 14 – Katherine MacDonald, American silent screen actress (d. 1956)
- December 17 – Hu Shih, Chinese liberal (d. 1962)
- December 19 – Edward Bernard Raczynski, President of Poland (d. 1993)
- December 24 – Feodor Stepanovich Rojankovsky, Russian illustrator (d. 1970)
- December 25
  - Kenneth Anderson, British general (d. 1959)
  - Clarrie Grimmett, New Zealand-Australian cricketer (d. 1980)
- December 26 – Henry Miller, American novelist (d. 1980)
- December 29 – Béla Imrédy, 32nd Prime Minister of Hungary (d. 1946)

=== Date unknown ===
- Aleksander Wachniewski, Polish engineer and politician (d. 1976)

== Deaths ==
=== January–June ===
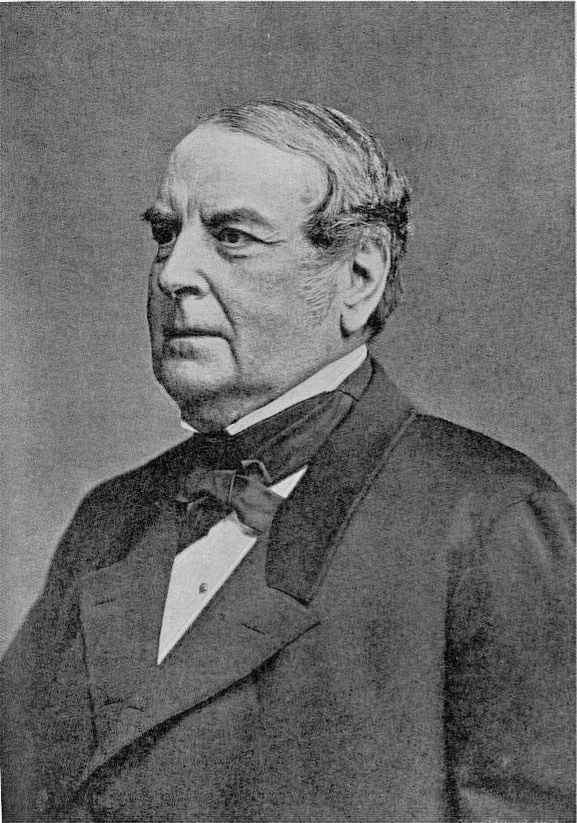
Carl Johan Thyselius

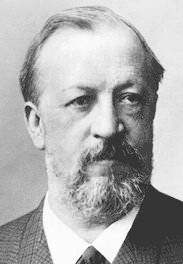
Nicolaus Otto

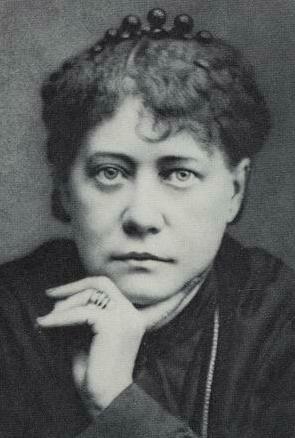
Helena Petrovna Blavatsky

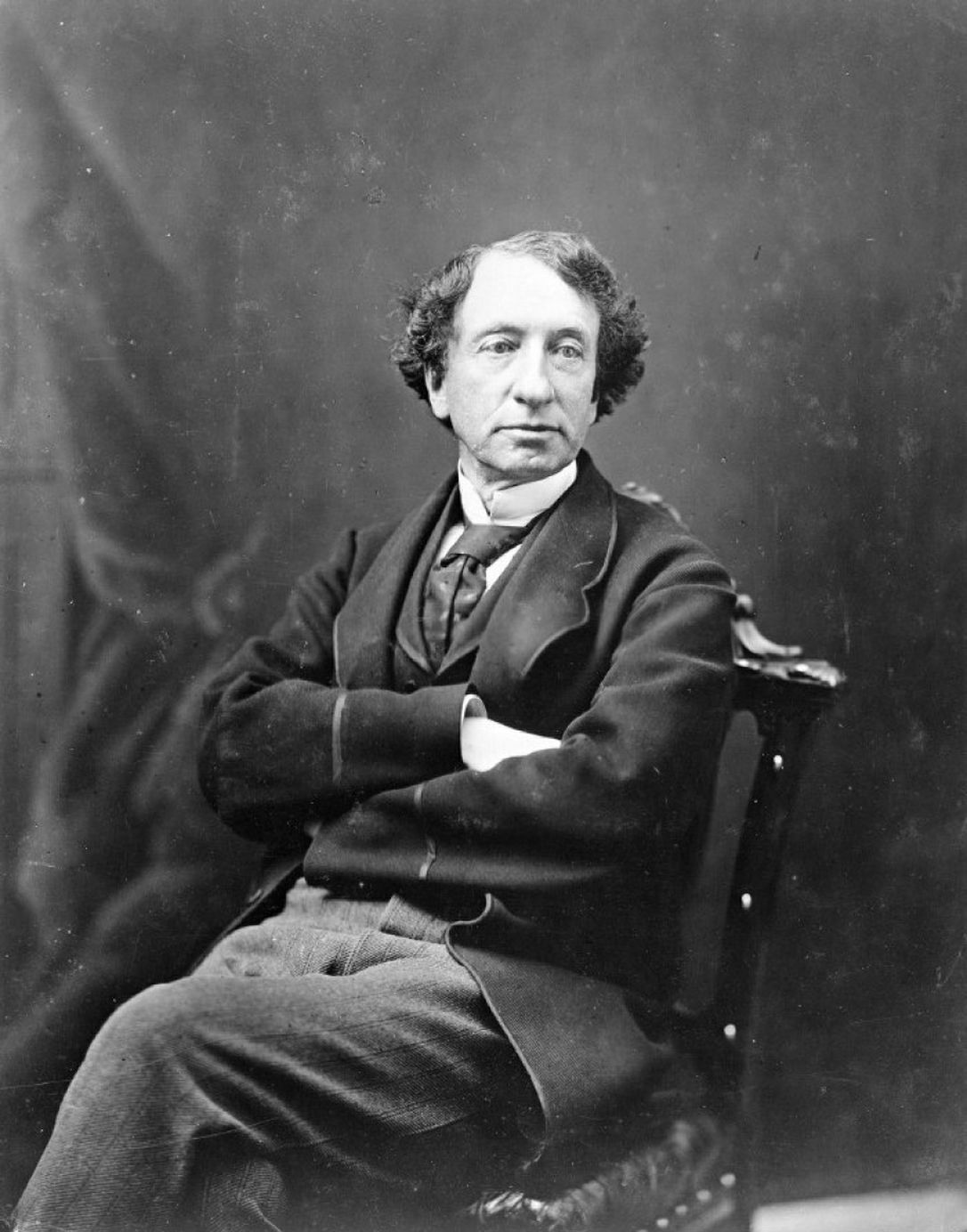
John A. Macdonald

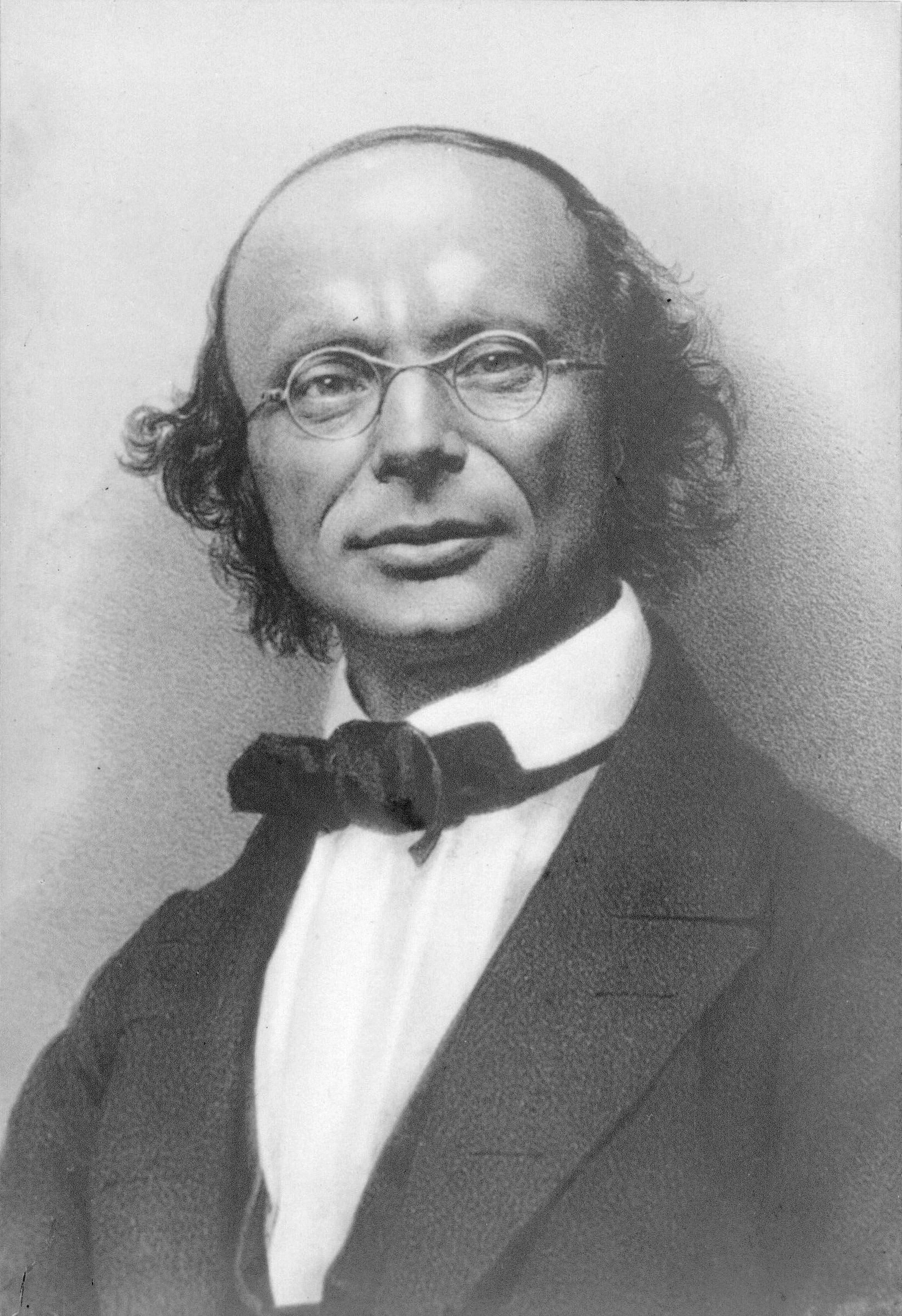
Wilhelm Eduard Weber

- January 4 – Charles Keene, English artist and illustrator (b. 1823)
- January 5 – Emma Abbott, American opera singer (b. 1849)
- January 11
  - Georges-Eugène Haussmann, French city planner (b. 1809)
  - Carl Johan Thyselius, Swedish politician, 3rd Prime Minister of Sweden (b. 1811)
- January 15 – John Wellborn Root, American architect (b. 1850)
- January 16 – Léo Delibes, French composer (b. 1836)
- January 20 – Kalākaua, last reigning King of Hawaii (b. 1836)
- January 21
  - Calixa Lavallée, Canadian composer (b. 1842)
  - James Timberlake, American lawman (b. 1846)
- January 25 – Theo van Gogh, Dutch art dealer (b. 1857)
- January 26 – Nicolaus Otto, German engineer (b. 1832)
- February 4 – Pelagio Antonio de Labastida y Dávalos, Roman Catholic archbishop and Mexican politician who served as regent during the Second Mexican Empire, 1863-1864 (b. 1816)
- February 10 – Sofia Kovalevskaya, Russian mathematician (b. 1850)
- February 13 – David Dixon Porter, American admiral (b. 1813)
- February 14 – William Tecumseh Sherman, American general (b. 1820)
- March 13 – Théodore de Banville, French writer (b. 1823)
- March 15 – Sir Joseph Bazalgette, English civil engineer (b. 1819)
- March 17 – Eduard Clam-Gallas, Austrian general (b. 1805)
- March 27 – James A. Ekin, Union Army general (b. 1819)
- March 29 – Georges Seurat, French painter (b. 1859)
- April 2 – Ahmed Vefik Pasha, Turkish statesman (b. 1823)
- April 7 – P. T. Barnum, American showman (b. 1810)
- April 9 – George Cavendish-Bentinck, British Conservative politician (b. 1821)
- April 24 – Helmuth von Moltke the Elder, Prussian field marshal (b. 1800)
- April 25 – Nathaniel Woodard, English educationalist (b. 1811)
- May 2 – Albany James Christie, British Jesuit priest and academic (b. 1817)
- May 8
  - Helena Blavatsky, Russian-born author, theosophist (b. 1831)
  - Sir John Robertson, Australian politician, Premier of New South Wales (b. 1816)
- May 16 – Ion C. Brătianu, 2-Time Prime Minister of Romania (b. 1821)
- June 6 – John A. Macdonald, 1st Prime Minister of Canada, Father of Confederation (b. 1815)
- June 19 – David Settle Reid, American politician (b. 1813)
- June 23 – Samuel Newitt Wood, American politician (b. 1825)
- June 24 – Wilhelm Eduard Weber, German physicist (b. 1804)

=== July–December ===
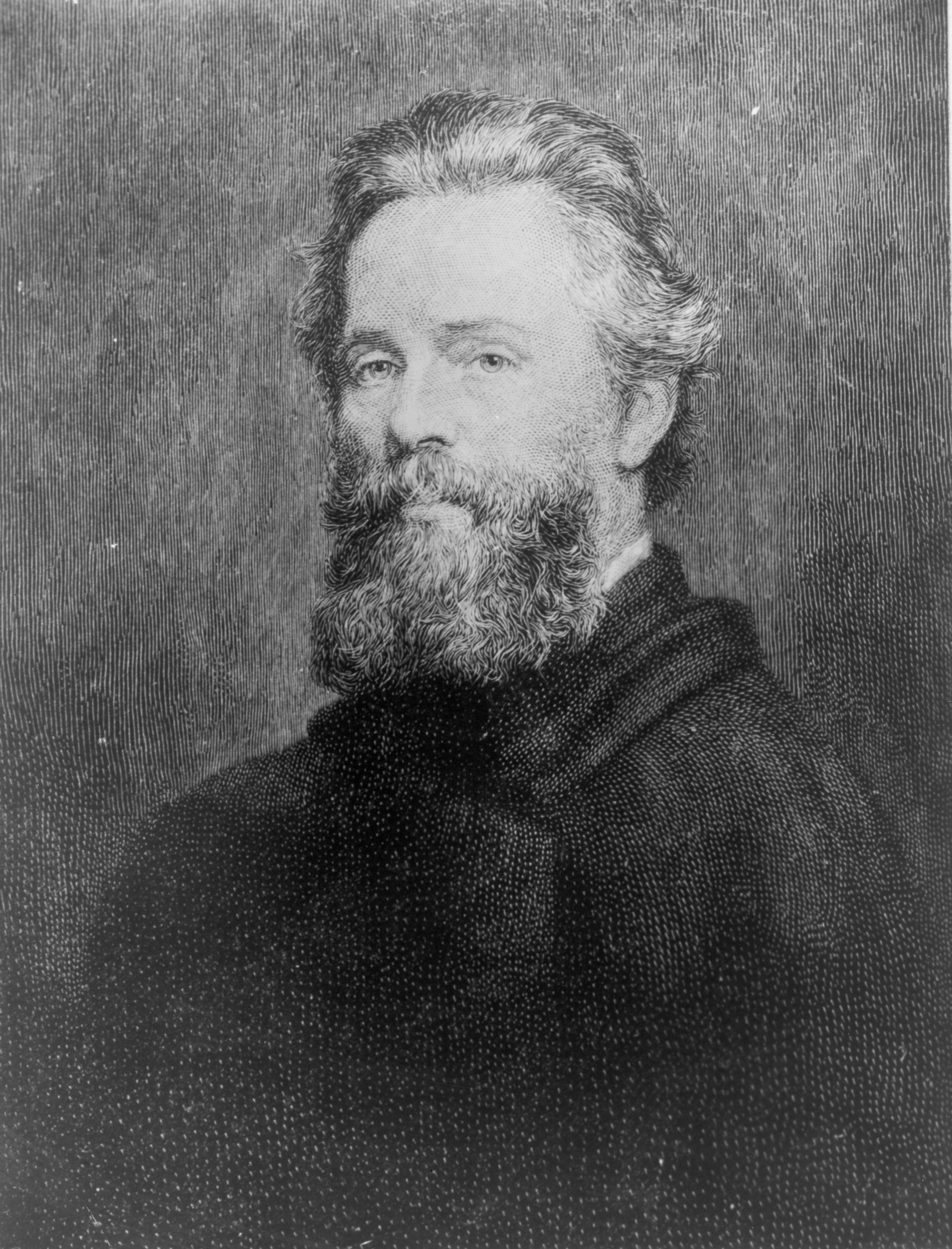
Herman Melville

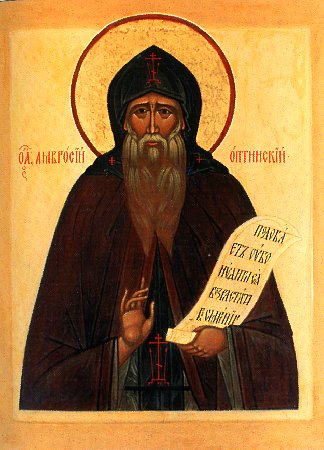
Saint Ambrose of Optina

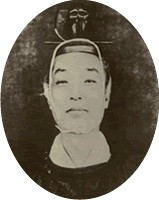
Prince Kuni Asahiko

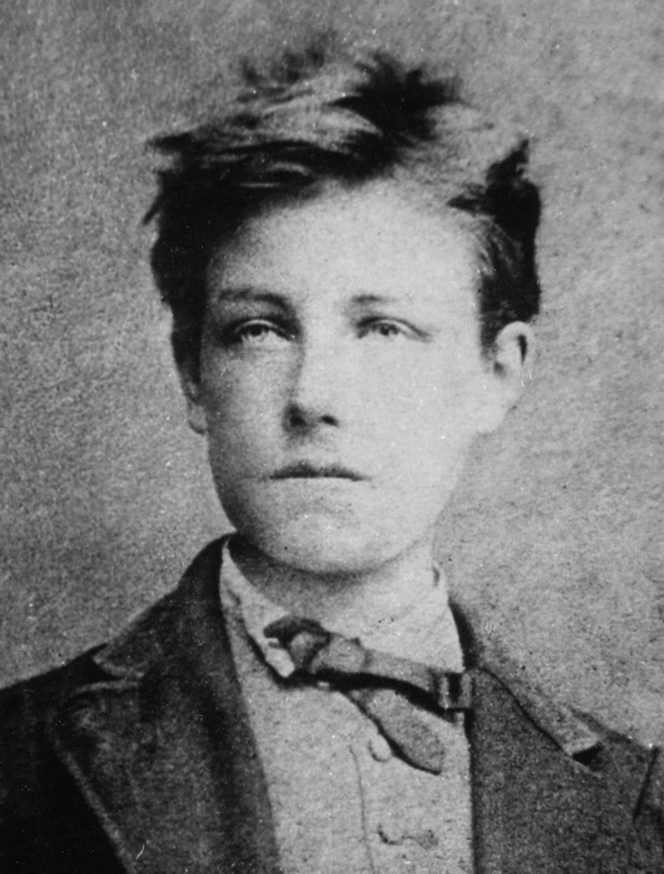
Arthur Rimbaud

- July 1 – Mihail Kogălniceanu, 3rd Prime Minister of Romania (b. 1817)
- July 4 – Hannibal Hamlin, 15th Vice President of the United States (b. 1809)
- July 20 – Sir Frederick Weld, 6th Prime Minister of New Zealand (b. 1823)
- July 24 – Hermann Raster, German-born Forty-Eighter, editor-in-chief of the Illinois Staats-Zeitung (b. 1827)
- August 12 – James Russell Lowell, American poet and essayist (b. 1819)
- August 14 – Sarah Childress Polk, First Lady of the United States (b. 1803)
- August 27 – Samuel C. Pomeroy, American politician, railroad executive (b. 1816)
- August 29 – Pierre Lallement, French inventor of the bicycle (b. 1843?)
- September 4 – José María Urvina, 5th President of Ecuador (b. 1808)
- September 7 – Lorenzo Sawyer, 9th Chief Justice of the Supreme Court of California (b. 1820)
- September 11 – Antero de Quental, Portuguese poet (b. 1842)
- September 15 – Ivan Goncharov, Russian author (b. 1812)
- September 19 – José Manuel Balmaceda, 10th President of Chile (b. 1840)
- September 28 – Herman Melville, American novelist (b. 1819)
- September 30 – Georges Ernest Boulanger, French general, politician (b. 1837)
- October 6
  - Charles I of Württemberg (b. 1823)
  - Charles Stewart Parnell, Irish nationalist leader (b. 1846)
- October 15 – Lawrence Dudley Bailey, American abolitionist and jurist who served on the Kansas Supreme Court from 1861 to 1869 (b. 1819)
- October 23 – Ambrose of Optina, Russian Orthodox saint (b. 1812)
- October 25 – Prince Kuni Asahiko of Japan (b. 1824)
- November 6 – J. Gregory Smith, Vermont governor (b. 1818)
- November 10 – Arthur Rimbaud, French poet (b. 1854)
- November 17 – George H. Cooper, United States Navy admiral (b. 1821)
- November 28 – Sir James Corry, 1st Baronet, British politician (b. 1826)
- December 4 – Frederick Whitaker, English-New Zealand lawyer, politician and 5th Prime Minister of New Zealand (b. 1812)
- December 5 – Pedro II, 2nd and last Emperor of Brazil (b. 1825)
- December 6 – Émile Bayard, French artist (b. 1837)
- December 7 – Mary Crane, American activist; mother of the writer, Stephen Crane (b. 1827)
- December 12 – Julia A. Ames, American reformer (b. 1861)
- December 17 – José María Iglesias, Mexican lawyer and journalist, interim president from 1876 to 1877 (b. 1823)
- December 20 – William Robert Woodman, British co-founder of the Hermetic Order of the Golden Dawn (b. 1828)
- December 29 – Leopold Kronecker, Polish-born German mathematician, academic (b. 1823)
- December 31 – Samuel Ajayi Crowther, 1st African Anglican bishop, linguist and legendary missionary (b. 1809)

=== Date unknown ===
- Anna Sprengel, German countess (alleged death)

== Sources ==
- Appletons' Annual Cyclopaedia and Register of Important Events of the Year 1891: Embracing Political, Military, and Ecclesiastical Affairs; Public Documents; Biography, Statistics, Commerce, Finance, Literature, Science, Agriculture, and Mechanical Industry (1892); highly detailed compilation of facts and primary documents; worldwide coverage. not online.
