= Moninya Roughan =

Professor of Oceanography

Moninya Roughan is a professor of Oceanography at the University of New South Wales in Australia. Roughan is the head of the Coastal and Regional Oceanography Lab and is an authority on the oceanography of the East Australian Current. She has led major projects for industry, government, the Australian Research Council and the New Zealand Ministry of Business Innovation and Employment. She has held leadership roles in Australia's Integrated Marine Observing System since 2007.

Roughan researches the dynamics of western boundary currents, ocean eddies and their interactions with the coastal ocean. She is an expert in marine heatwaves, dynamics of coastal ocean circulation, nutrient enrichment processes and their biological impact. She is primarily focussed on the East Australian Current System a warming western boundary current and its effects on the waters of the continental shelf. The work involves the use of observations and numerical models.

== Early life and education ==
Roughan grew up in Ku-ring-gai Council area of Sydney, Australia, a granddaughter of Winsome Andrew, one of Australia's award winning and first female architects, and great-granddaughter of Captain E. H. Andrew, first master of the wool clipper Cromdale.

She attended Loreto College, Normanhurst where she was Barry House Music captain.

She earned a BSc (Honours Class 1) in Oceanography at the University of New South Wales in 1998 and a PhD in Oceanography at the University of New South Wales in 2002.

== Career ==
Roughan was promoted to associate professor in 2015 and Professor in 2019 at UNSW. One of three first female professors in the school of mathematics and statistics at UNSW with Frances Kuo and Catherine Greenhill and one of the first two female Oceanography professors in Australia with Katrin Meissner.

During 2017–2019, Roughan worked in industry as Head of Research Partnerships for the NZ Meteorological Service.

== Research interests and impact ==
Roughan's work has been funded by the Australia Research Council, Australian Marine National Facility, Australian Federal and State Government programs, the New Zealand Ministry of Business Industry and Education, the US Office of Naval Research. She also undertakes contracted research and consultancy.

Recent work has focussed on drivers of ocean warming in the East Australian Current and drivers of ocean warming in the western boundary currents of the Southern Hemisphere.

Since 2006, Roughan has taken a key role in the design, deployment and ongoing development of one of the most comprehensive ocean observing systems in the southern hemisphere through her involvement in Australia's Integrated Marine Observing System. She has served on the NSW-IMOS leadership team since inception, including serving as leader and deputy leader of NSW IMOS node from 2007–2013 and a continuing member of the National Coastal Mooring Network Steering Committee. She leads the NSW-IMOS moorings sub-facility responsible for the continued deployment and maintenance of up to 10 oceanographic moorings along the coast of SE Australia. She continues to lead the science driving the deployment of ocean gliders and radar along the length of the East Australian Current. In recognition of her contribution to ocean observing she was invited to join the scientific programme committee for Ocean Obs2019, a once per decade conference on Ocean Observing.

Roughan was inaugural director of the Moana Project from 2017–2020 where she led the design, funding and implementation of an $11.5M MBIE project to investigate Marine heatwaves and ocean dynamics around New Zealand.

=== Research cruises ===
Roughan led a 24 day voyage on the RV Investigator Australia's Marine National Facility in Austral Spring 2023 (IN2023_V06) funded by a large Australian Research Council Discovery Project Grant. The voyage was noted as being one of the first investigations of ocean eddies in conjunction with a new satellite SWOT. Additionally the voyage provided new insight into the dynamics and evolution of large ocean eddies.

Roughan has previously led research voyages aboard several of Australia's Marine National Facility research vessels including the RV Investigator IN2015 V03 (Brisbane- Sydney) and the RV Southern Surveyor ST 02/2006 (Sydney–Noumea).

She has also participated in two scientific cruises to the Antarctic: Antarctic Astrolabe 2000 and the RV Aurora Australis.

Roughan was aboard the Aurora Australis on its first winter voyage to the Antarctic, a seven-week expedition to explore, the Mertz Glacier Polynya, when a fire broke out in the engine room while the ship was deep within the ice.

Roughan served on the Australian Marine National Facility Research Advisory Committee from 2017-2023.

== Prizes, honours and awards ==
Roughan was elected a Fellow of the Australian Meteorological and Oceanographic Society in 2024 and a Fellow of the Royal Society of New South Wales in 2022. Her other awards include:

- 2023, Clarke Medal and Lecture in Earth Sciences from the Royal Society of New South Wales
- 2016, Seeyle Fellowship, University of Auckland, Auckland, New Zealand
- 2015, China High End Foreign Experts Award, ECNU, Shanghai, China
- 2002, American Geophysical Union Outstanding Student Paper award in Physical Oceanography
- 1998, Australian Post Graduate Award 3 year Scholarship UNSW, Australia
- 1996, Sam Cracknell Memorial Scholarship UNSW, Australia

== Selected publications ==
- Junde Li; Moninya Roughan; Colette Kerry (2022). "Drivers of ocean warming in the western boundary currents of the Southern Hemisphere". Nature Climate Change. 12 (10): 901–909. doi:10.1038/s41558-022-01473-8. Wikidata Q114647856.
- M. Roughan; S. R. Keating; A. Schaeffer; P. Cetina Heredia; C. Rocha; D. Griffin; R. Robertson; I. M. Suthers (2017). "A tale of two eddies: The biophysical characteristics of two contrasting cyclonic eddies in the East Australian Current System". Journal of Geophysical Research: Oceans. 122 (3): 2494–2518. Bibcode:2017JGRC..122.2494R. doi:10.1002/2016jc012241. Wikidata Q59138620.
- Moninya Roughan (2004). "On the East Australian Current: Variability, encroachment, and upwelling". Journal of Geophysical Research. 109 (C7). Bibcode:2004JGRC..109.7003R. doi:10.1029/2003jc001833. Wikidata Q59138663.
- M. R. Archer; S. R. Keating; M. Roughan; W. E. Johns; R. Lumpkin; F. J. Beron-Vera; L. K. Shay (2018). "The Kinematic Similarity of Two Western Boundary Currents Revealed by Sustained High-Resolution Observations". Geophysical Research Letters. Bibcode:2018GeoRL..45.6176A. doi:10.1029/2018gl078429. Wikidata Q59138615.
- Youstina Elzahaby; Amandine Schaeffer; Moninya Roughan; Sébastien Delaux (2021). "Oceanic Circulation Drives the Deepest and Longest Marine Heatwaves in the East Australian Current System". Geophysical Research Letters. 48 (17). Bibcode:2021GeoRL..4894785E. doi:10.1029/2021gl094785. Wikidata Q108595668.
- Paulina Cetina-Heredia; Moninya Roughan; van Sebille, Erik; Ming Feng; Coleman, Melinda (2015). "Strengthened currents override the effect of warming on lobster larval dispersal and survival". Global Change Biology. 21 (12): 4377–4386. Bibcode:2015GCBio..21.4377C. doi:10.1111/gcb.13063. PMID 26268457. Wikidata Q30987037.
- Moninya Roughan; Helen S. Macdonald; Mark E. Baird; Glasby, Tim (2011). "Modelling coastal connectivity in a Western Boundary Current: Seasonal and inter-annual variability". Deep-Sea Research. Part 2: Topical Studies in Oceanography. 58 (5): 628–644. doi:10.1016/j.dsr2.2010.06.004. Wikidata Q56763862.
- Moninya Roughan; Amandine Schaeffer; Iain M. Suthers (2015), Sustained Ocean Observing along the Coast of Southeastern Australia, pp. 76–98, doi:10.1016/b978-0-12-802022-7.00006-7, Wikidata Q59138630
- Colette Kerry; Brian Powell; Moninya Roughan; Peter Oke (2016). "Development and evaluation of a high-resolution reanalysis of the East Australian Current region using the Regional Ocean Modelling System (ROMS 3.4) and Incremental Strong-Constraint 4-Dimensional Variational (IS4D-Var) data assimilation". Geoscientific Model Development. 9 (10): 3779–3801. doi:10.5194/gmd-9-3779-2016. Wikidata Q57895059.
- Steefan Contractor; Moninya Roughan (2021). "Efficacy of Feedforward and LSTM Neural Networks at Predicting and Gap Filling Coastal Ocean Timeseries: Oxygen, Nutrients, and Temperature". Frontiers in Marine Science. 8. doi:10.3389/fmars.2021.637759. Wikidata Q108595707.
