= Perfecta =

Perfecta may refer to:

- Perfecta (album), a 1995 album by Adam Again
- Perfecta (gambling), a type of bet in parimutuel betting
- Perfecta, an album by Banda Los Recoditos
- "Perfecta" (song), by Miranda! and Julieta Venegas
- "Perfecta", a song by Jesse & Joy from the album ¿Con Quién Se Queda el Perro?
- La Perfecta, a band from Martinique

== See also ==
- Perfect (disambiguation)
- Perfecto (disambiguation)
