= La Perfecta =

Big band from Martinique

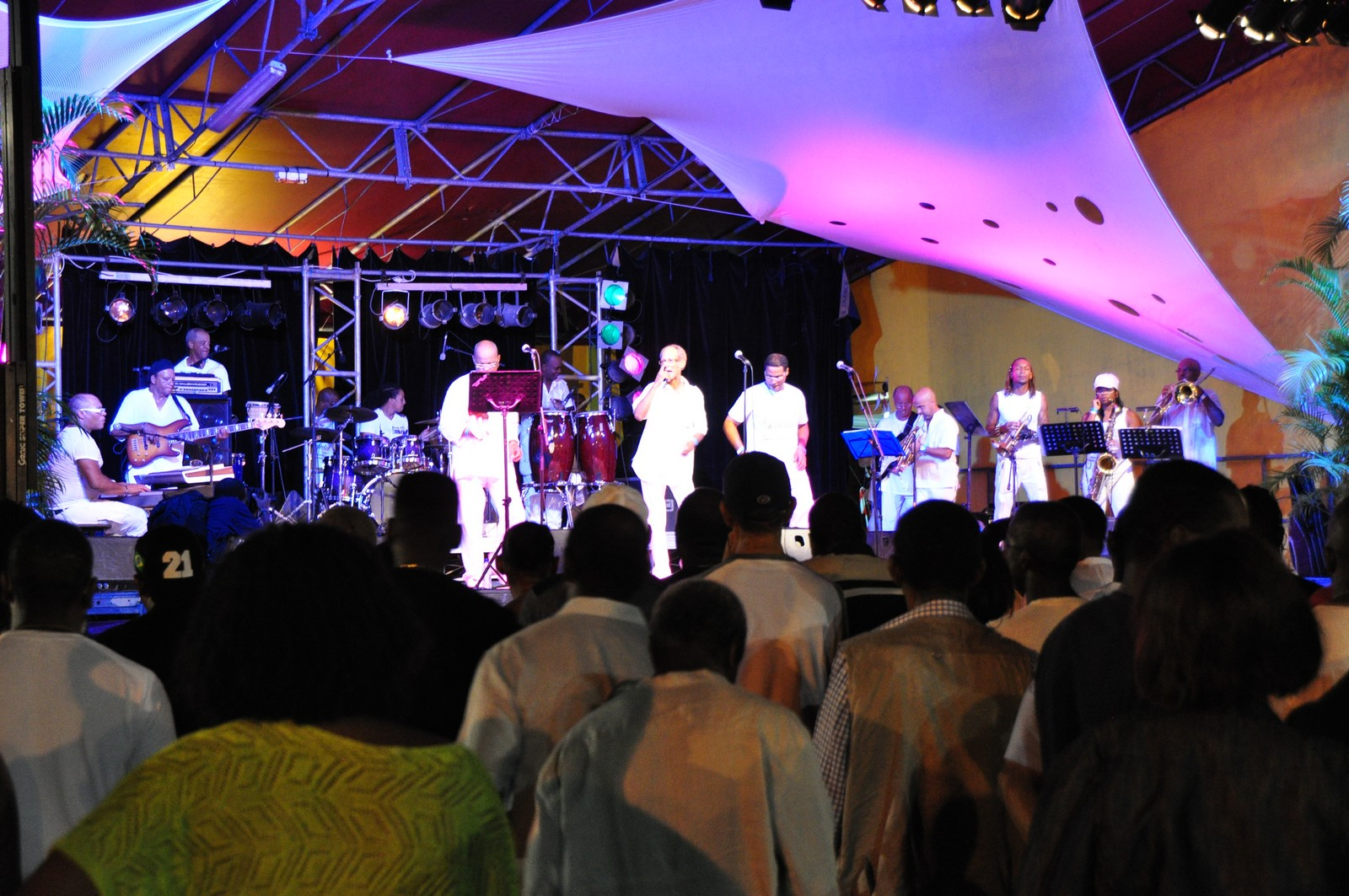
- La Perfecta in 2011

Background information
- Origin: La Trinité, Martinique, French West Indies
- Genres: Kadans
- Labels: DEBS Music

La Perfecta was a big band from Martinique whose styles included cadence and compas.

== Discography ==
- Pour toujours (DEBS, 1996)
- L'inoubliable Perfecta (1979)
- A youskous pas fe fou (DEBS)
- Help me baby
- La divinité (DEBS)
- Retrouvailles (Hibiscus Records)

Album : Retrouvailles Label : Hibiscus Records Année : 2003

1. Perfeta L'original
2. Wou
3. Fais Pas Si Fais Pas Ca
4. L'anmou Ce Mêt
5. Peyi A Ka Chalvire
6. Rêverie
7. Titine Makrel
8. Manmaye Jodi
9. Devoir De Mémoire
10. La Divinité
11. Ayen
12. Devoir De Mémoire

Album : Pour toujours Label : DEBS Music Année : 1996

1. Sevi ou mori
2. Nou toujou la
3. Dilou
4. Mamy
5. En nous alle
6. Mon caporal
7. Holyday's flight
8. Pli ta pli tris
9. Tcha tcha co ou

Album : 1970-1980 Label : DEBS Music

1. Indicatif
2. Tout' cé yo
3. Hotel California
4. Courage
5. Crépuscule
6. Manmaill' la
7. Rêve moin
8. La prière

Album : A youskous pas fe fou Label : DEBS Music

Album : Help me baby

1. Help me baby
2. Chimin an
3. Suplication
4. Yo que save
5. Refuge moin

Album : La divinité Label : DEBS Music

1. La divinité
2. Baille chabon
3. Laisse i passe
4. Constatation
5. Angela
6. Getting out the darkness
7. Il le fallait
8. Si ou pas le comprend
9. Fasaria

Album : La perfecta à l'atrium Label : DEBS Music

1. Clair de Lune à l'escale
2. Tout bagaye paré
3. A youskous
4. Cuando mega si
5. Getting out the darkness
6. Help me baby
7. Ad libitum
8. Face à face
9. La prière
10. Chimen-an
11. La divinité
12. La Perfecta au Bataclan
13. Interviews
14. A youskous (version originale)

Album : Tout bagail parer Label : DEBS Music

1. Tout bagail parer
2. A youskous pas fe fou
3. Adieu fort de france et mon pays
4. Chic chec choc
5. Pas tchouei
6. Roro deg deg
7. Cadence pom pom
8. Demain ke river
9. Yo ke sav
10. Jodi jou
