= Gregorio Perfecto High School =

- Mataas na Paaralang Gregorio Perfecto
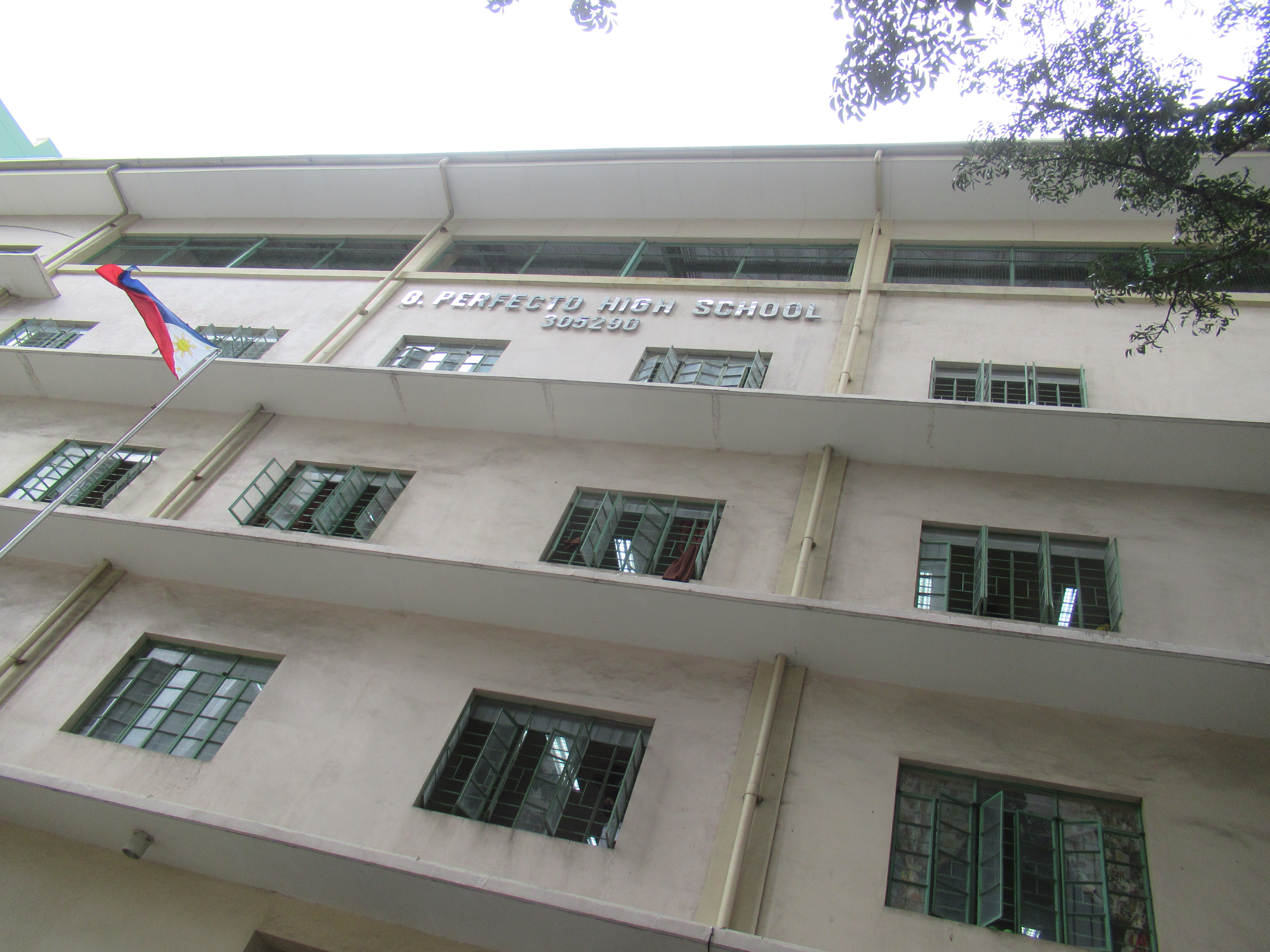

Location
- Ricafort St., Tondo, Manila; City of Manila, Metro Manila; Philippines
- Coordinates: 14°36′36″N 120°58′15″E

Information
- Former name: Ismar High School
- Type: Public high school
- Established: 1958
- School district: 1
- Principal: Dr. Mary Grace O. Awkit
- Grades: 7 to 12
- Enrollment: About 2000
- Language: Filipino, English
- Student Union/Association: Supreme Student Government
- Colors: Gold and blue
- Newspaper: GP News (Filipino: Ang Tilamsik)
- Affiliations: Division of City Schools-Manila
- Website: (Facebook: Gregorio Perfecto High School)

Gregorio Perfecto High School (Filipino: Mataas na Paaralang Gregorio Perfecto) is a high school in Ricafort St. near Juan Luna St., Tondo, Manila, Philippines that started as the Ismar Annex of Florentino Torres High School.

== History ==
=== Founding ===
Gregorio Perfecto High School had its beginnings as an extension of Florentino Torres High School. In 1947, the principal of Florentino Torres High School, Mr. Pablo Reyes, recommended the conversion of Ismar Annex into a separate high schools because it had grown big and unwieldy with 1,375 students and 45 teachers. The recommendation would be followed up and received in succeeding years but to no avail. However, the move gained urgency in 1951 when enrollment in the mother school swelled to 7,369 students and officials recommended that the school be divided into two or three independent high schools.

The proposal to make Ismar Annex an independent high school finally materialized on June 16, 1958, the annex became Ismar High School. The privately owned main building was at Juan Luna St., while Fugoso Annex was located at the corner of Tapuri and Yangco. This was in accordance with Division Memorandum No. 60 s. 1958. The new school was supervised by Fabian Bugayong as second principal, Leonor Zapanta as head teacher and Aurelio Libao as guidance counselor. There were 66 teachers and a population of 1,425 students.

On September 25, 1958, then mayor Arsenio H. Lacson approved Resolution No. 529 changing Ismar High School to Gregorio Perfecto High School in honor of the late Supreme Court Associate Justice Gregorio Perfecto, one of the signatories of the 1935 Constitution who used to represent Tondo in Congress. By November 27, 1966, the school was founded and inaugurated as Gregorio Perfecto High School coinciding with the 6th Foundation Anniversary.

=== Reconstructions ===
There were series of petitions and efforts made during the time of Domingo Quiambao, Miss Ines Villanueva and Bartolome del Valle to house Gregorio Perfecto High School in a new building and location from its previous site at Gagalangin, Tondo. Construction of the new building for Gregorio Perfecto High School started in April 1964 in Ricafort St., Tondo.

The building was damaged by an earthquake in 1969, then another one in 1990 that led to the total reconstruction of the school building. The reconstruction lasted for three years. But during the reconstruction period classes went on. The first and second levels were housed at the Tondo Sports Complex, the third year in a vacant lot located at Ricafort St. where makeshift rooms were put up, and the fourth year at the Manuel L. Quezon Elementary School.

It was repaired, only to be condemned again in 1990 after the earthquake that hit Central and Northern Luzon. The school building was finally restored in 1993. A fire destroyed the third floor on December 6, 1996. The third floor of the school building was restored and was inaugurated on September 17, 1997. 17 classrooms were destroyed in the third floor, necessitating emergency scheduling once more. Normalcy was restored in 1997 with the reconstruction of the third floor just as improvements were made. A new school was born, not only in infrastructure but also in spirit.

Many resolutions had pushed by the school administration until it materialized in 2014, the time of many news regarding the Big One, expected catastrophic earthquake that might hit the West Valley Fault along Metro Manila and Southern Luzon. On August 4, 2014, the whole school needed a total reconstruction due to the critical condition of the building. But even if the reconstruction is still ongoing, the classes still continues. The seventh and eighth grade were housed at Gen. Maximino Hizon Elementary School and the ninth and tenth grade at the Gen. Gregorio del Pilar Elementary School. On February 17, 2015, a fire razed some of the three school buildings of Gen. Gregorio del Pilar Elem. School.

=== Achievements ===
The school was noted for its dynamism and achievements in various fields. The assistance of De La Salle University under the Partnership for Educational Change forged in 2000 and later the Operation Big Brother (OBB) for selected classes, which spurs the quest for excellence. Principal Miss Angela Y. Ong and later Mr. Arnulfo H. Empleo lent administrative and managerial know how as the school turned the corner.

=== Alumni Association Inc. ===
On June 30, 2018, through the initiatives of Mr. Edwin Santos, School Administrative Officer IV hosted the 2018 GPHS Alumni Association Inc. election of officers and elected Mr. Cesar Juaban of Batch 1979 as the President. The elected officers will last until 2021. On November 28, 2018, the school hosted the first-ever Grand Alumni Homecoming attended by roughly 1300 alumni with retired and promoted teachers coinciding its Diamond Jubilee: GPHS 60th Founding Anniversary.

== Principals ==
| Principals | Years |
|---|---|
| Fabian Bugayong | 1958–1959 |
| Domingo Quiambao | 1960–1962 |
| Ines Villanueva | 1962–1963 |
| Aurelio L. Mendoza | 1963–1971 |
| Dominador S. Wingsing | 1971–1977 |
| Aurelio T. Libao | 1978–1982 |
| Clarita T. Nolasco (Assistant Principal) | 1981–1982 |
| Hilario F. Galvez | 1983–1985 |
| Flora M. Balanag | 1985–1986 |
| Rebecca Nava | 1986 - 1987 |
| Norma M. Escobar | 1986–1987 |
| Alegria E. Armas | 1988–1990 |
| Elena R. Ruiz | 1990–1991 |
| Julita C. Antonio | 1992–1993 |
| Romeo B. Santos | 1993–1995 |
| Pilar G. Pizarro | 1995–1998 |
| Angela Y. Ong | 1998–2002 |
| Arnulfo H. Empleo | 2002–2003 |
| Eugenia R. Gorgon | 2004–2005 |
| Alma C. Tadina | 2006–2010 |
| Nilda V. Cas | 2010–2011 |
| Amelita P. de Mesa | 2011–2013 |
| Marion A. Mallorca | 2013–2014 |
| Mirasol P. Dala | 2014–2016 |
| Diosdado DG. Florendo | 2016–2021 |
| June Hayden R. Sinson | 2021–2023 |
| Dr. Mary Grace O. Awkit | 2024–Present |
