= Gregorio Perfecto =

Filipino judge and politician (1891–1949)

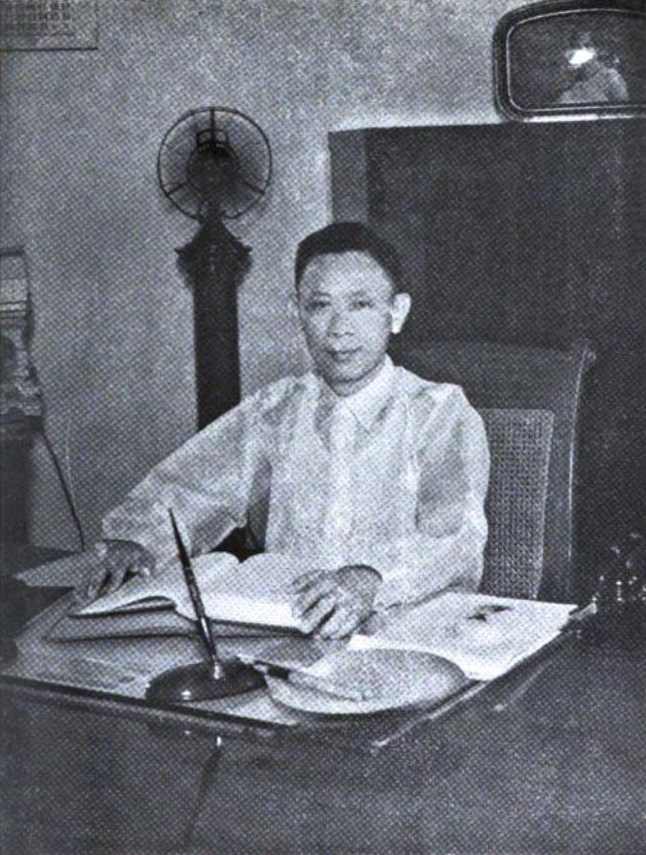
- Photograph from The Commercial & Industrial Manual of the Philippines, 1941

48th Associate Justice of the Philippine Supreme Court
- In office June 6, 1945 – August 17, 1949
- Appointed by: Sergio Osmeña
- Preceded by: None
- Succeeded by: Felix Angelo Bautista

Member of the Philippine National Assembly from Manila's 1st District
- In office November 15, 1935 – December 30, 1941
- Preceded by: Francisco Varona
- Succeeded by: District dissolved (Position next held by Engracio Clemeña)

Member of the Philippine House of Representatives from Manila's 1st District
- In office 1922–1928
- Preceded by: Juan Nolasco
- Succeeded by: Francisco Varona

Personal details
- Born: November 28, 1891 Mandurriao, Iloilo, Captaincy General of the Philippines, Spanish East Indies
- Died: August 17, 1949 (aged 57) Manila, Philippines
- Spouse(s): Patrocinio David; Paz Brabo

Gregorio Milián Perfecto (November 28, 1891 – August 17, 1949) was a Filipino journalist, politician and jurist who served as an Associate Justice of the Supreme Court of the Philippines from 1945 to 1949. A controversial figure who was described as an "apostle of liberal causes", Perfecto was notable for his libertarian views, his colorful writing style, and the frequency of his dissenting opinions while on the Supreme Court.

== Early life ==
Perfecto was born in Mandurriao, Iloilo. When he was a youth, his family moved to Ligao, Albay, where he received his primary education. He finished his secondary education at San Beda College in Manila. Perfecto entered Colegio de San Juan de Letran, where he received his Bachelor of Arts degree. He then enrolled in the law program of the University of Santo Tomas, where he received his law degree. Perfecto passed the bar examinations and was admitted to the Philippine Bar in 1916.

== Journalistic career ==
Perfecto practiced law for some time, then began a career for journalism as a reporter for the La Vanguardia and the Consolidacion Nacional newspapers. By 1919, Perfecto was the editor of the La Nacion daily newspaper. His tenure at La Nacion proved controversial, as he embarked on crusades against corruption and errant public officials. He was sued for criminal libel at least four times, the complaints being lodged by various local and national officials, including by the Philippine Senate. He was nonetheless acquitted of all charges by the Philippine Supreme Court, in a series of decisions promulgated between 1921 and 1922.

== Political career ==
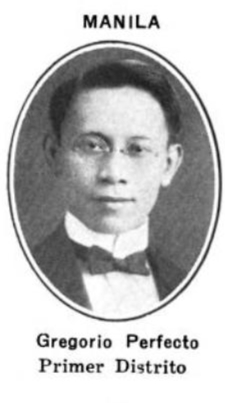
Perfecto as member of the House of Representatives, c. 1923

In 1922, Perfecto was elected to the Philippine Legislature, as a representative from the North District of Manila. He served until 1928. In 1931, Perfecto was stricken with polio and was left disabled by the disease. Though he was unable to walk without the assistance of crutches, Perfecto recovered well enough to be able to resume playing golf.

Perfecto was a member of the Partido Democrata founded by Claro M. Recto, eventually becoming its general secretary and general provisional president. Among the leaders of the Partido Democrata was then Senator Sergio Osmeña, who would later appoint him to the Supreme Court.

In 1934, Perfecto was elected a delegate to the Constitutional Convention that drafted the 1935 Constitution. After the constitution had been drafted, Perfecto had a doctor open a vein in his arm so he could sign the document using his own blood as ink. Following the approval of the Constitution in a plebiscite, Perfecto was elected to represent the North District of Manila again in the National Assembly. He served in such capacity for two terms, from 1935 to 1941. He advocated for laws for the improvement of conditions for the employment of laborers, and for the grant of women's suffrage.

== Justice of the Supreme Court ==
In June 1945, Perfecto was appointed by President Sergio Osmeña to the Supreme Court, which had been reorganized following the end of the Japanese occupation of the Philippines. He served on the court until his death in 1949.

In his four years on the court, Perfecto authored 172 majority opinions and over 200 separate opinions, including 195 dissenting opinions. He is the only Justice in Philippine Supreme Court history to have penned more dissenting opinions than majority opinions. In all, Perfecto dissented 20.6% of the time during his tenure on the court, there having been 945 decisions handed down during that period.

Impeachment proceedings were initiated against Perfecto in Congress for converting his office into living quarters, though he had done so with the authorization of Chief Justice Manuel Moran on account of his physical disability. Perfecto charged that the attempts at impeachment, which were ultimately unsuccessful, were politically motivated.

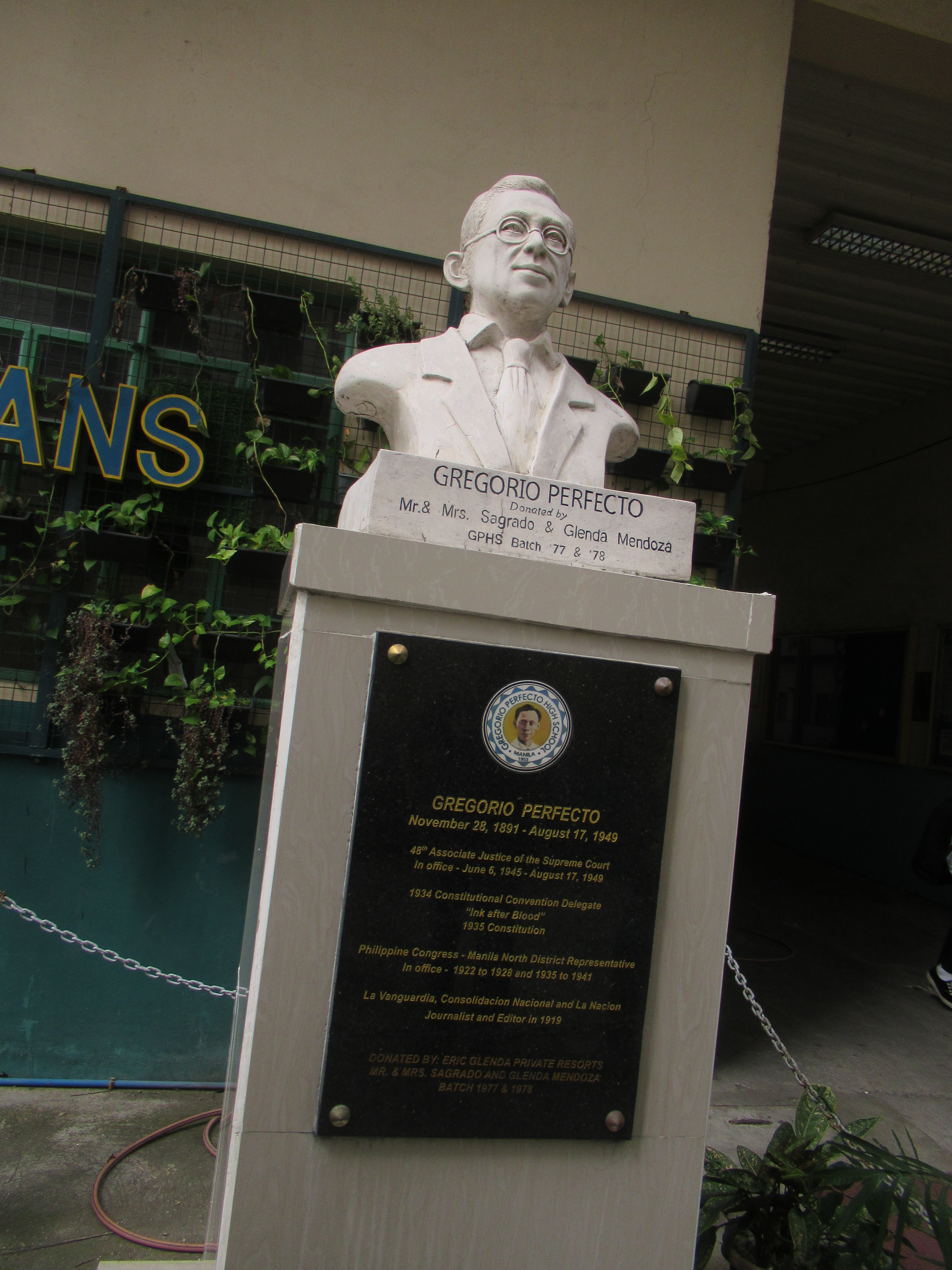
Statue and historical marker in Gregorio Perfecto High School

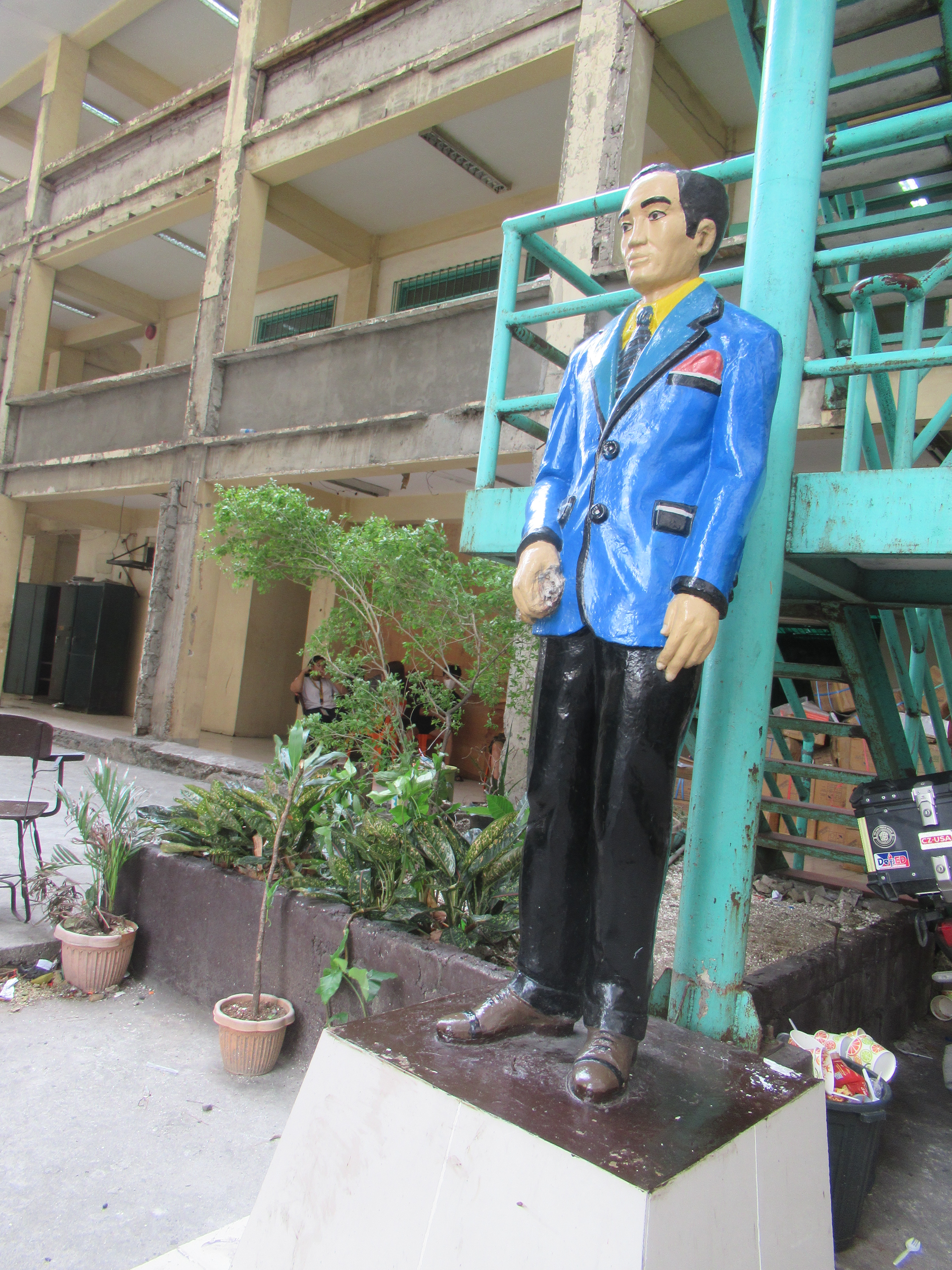
Standing statue of Perfecto

=== Jurisprudence ===
Perfecto's dissenting and concurring opinions are better remembered than his majority opinions. Of the ponencias he authored, the most consequential was Co Chiong v. Cuaderno, 83 Phil. 242 (1949) wherein the court affirmed a law granting preference to Filipino citizens in the lease of public market stalls.

Perfecto's separate opinions give a clearer indication of his jurisprudential philosophy. His firm libertarian views were fully expressed in several dissents. In Raquiza v. Bradford, 75 Phil. 50 (1945), he voted to grant habeas corpus to three Filipinos detained by the United States military as Japanese spies, despite a proclamation from General Douglas MacArthur ordering the indefinite detention of Filipinos who collaborated with the Japanese Imperial Army during World War II. In Moncado v. People's Court, 80 Phil. 1 (1948), the majority refused to adopt the exclusionary rule as a consequence of an illegal search or seizure. Perfecto wrote in dissent: "May the government profit from an illegality, an unconstitutional act, or even a crime to serve its aims, including the loftiest? May justice be administered by making use of the fruits of a lawless action?"

In In re Subido, 81 Phil 517 (1948), the majority had found a newspaper editor guilty of contempt for prematurely but correctly reporting that the court had voted to bar foreigners from acquiring agricultural lands in the Philippines in Krivenko v. Director of Lands, 79 Phil. 461. In his dissent, Perfecto admitted that he was the editor's source for the report, but defended his action by observing that in the several months after the vote, before the decision was finally released, the issue had been widely debated in the media, and a rush had begun to complete the transfer of lands to foreigners. Perfecto also defended the editor, who he said had performed a public service but was being punished for publishing the truth, and asserted that press freedom was a constitutional right.

Dissenting in Dizon v. Commanding General, 81 Phil. 286 (1948), Perfecto argued that the grant of extraterritorial jurisdiction to the United States government over criminal offenses committed within American military bases established through the 1947 RP-US Military Bases Agreement was unconstitutional, since the Constitution granted such jurisdiction only to Philippine courts. Perfecto criticized what he perceived as the servility of the Philippine government to the United States. "This Supreme Court has the power to stop the rampage of constitutional breaches in which other agencies of our government are indulging in a servile attitude of complaisance to former masters who are bent on keeping in their hands the strings, the chains, and the whip of unquestioned command. Our oath of office compels us to exercise that power. We do not entertain much respect for the Soviet satellites in Eastern and Central Europe. Shall we allow ourselves to go down in history as a mere American satellite?"

Perfecto was not hesitant in insisting upon judicial review over acts of the executive or legislative branches of government, even against the defense that the issues raised were political questions. In Mabanag v. Lopez Vito, 78 Phil. 1 (1947), Perfecto dissented after the majority declined to examine whether the requisite votes in the House and Senate were obtained in the passage of an amendment to the Constitution allowing American citizens the right to use and develop natural resources in the Philippines. In Avelino v. Cuenco, 83 Phil. 17 (1949) Perfecto again dissented when the majority refused to rule on the validity of the election of Mariano Jesús Cuenco as acting Senate President. Perfecto opined that while the questions raised were political in nature, they were "justiciable because they involve the enforcement of legal precepts, such as the provisions of the Constitution and of the rules of the Senate."

=== Writing style ===
In writing his opinions, Perfecto employed "picturesque language" which according to Justice Isagani Cruz had "earned him a special place in jurisprudence" and would "enliven generations of law students to come". After his death, it was suggested by his friend, Senator Tomas Cabili, that "he must have deliberately used intemperate and exaggerated language, to the consternation of the bar and the bench, because it was the only effective means with which he could pierce through the fog of hazy understanding of the masses of what a real democracy means; perhaps he had to shout hard so many could hear him."

Among some of Perfecto's more memorable passages are:

The present is liable to confusion. Our minds are subject to determinate and indeterminate ideological pressures. Very often man walks in the darkness of a blind alley obeying the pullings and pushings of hidden and unhidden forces, or the arcane predeterminations of the genes of human chromosomes.

Man is easily deceived into committing blunders or led into the most absurd aberrations. The mysterious genes which keep uninterrupted the chain of heredity, while permitting the transmission of the best qualities and characteristics, seems to lack the power of checking and staving off the tendencies of atavism. In the moral ctetology, either kind of characteristics and qualities may be originated and developed… To set two moral standards, a strict one for private individuals and another vitiated with laxity for the government, is to throw society into the abyss of legal ataxia. Anarchy and chaos will become inevitable. Such a double standard will necessarily be nomoctonous.

It is useless to panegyrize democracy as the best political system ever conceived, when once put into practice it is sabotaged by the double-dealing of the men on whose shoulders weighs the responsibility of making it a success. A sham democracy is a fertile breeding ground for any doxy that may offer the allurement of a promissory land, where the masses will enjoy better conditions of life.

== Death ==
Perfecto died on August 17, 1949, after a brief illness. A Freemason, he was reconciled with the Catholic Church shortly before his death.

Shortly before his death, Perfecto took the highly unusual step of filing in his behalf a petition with the Supreme Court arguing that the salaries of judges and justices were exempted from income taxes by the Constitution. The case was decided in his favor after his death, though Justice Roman Ozaeta, in dissent, expressed that "[i]t is indeed embarrassing that this case was initiated by a member of this Court upon which devolves the duty to decide it finally."

Several years after his death, many of the decisions Perfecto dissented from were overturned by the Supreme Court, most notably Moncado v. People's Court and Mabanag v. Lopez Vito.

In 1958, the City of Manila named a secondary school in Tondo, Manila the Gregorio Perfecto High School after the late Justice.

== Notes ==
House of Representatives of the Philippines
Preceded by Juan Nolasco	Representative, 1st District of Manila; 1922–1928	Succeeded by Francisco Varona
Preceded by Francisco Varona as Representative	Assemblyman, 1st District of Manila; 1935–1941	Vacant District dissolved (National Assembly of the Second Philippine Republic) Title next held by Engracio Clemeña as Representative
Legal offices
Court reorganized	Associate Justice of the Supreme Court of the Philippines; 1945–1949	Succeeded by Felix Angelo Bautista
