= Cromdale (clipper) =

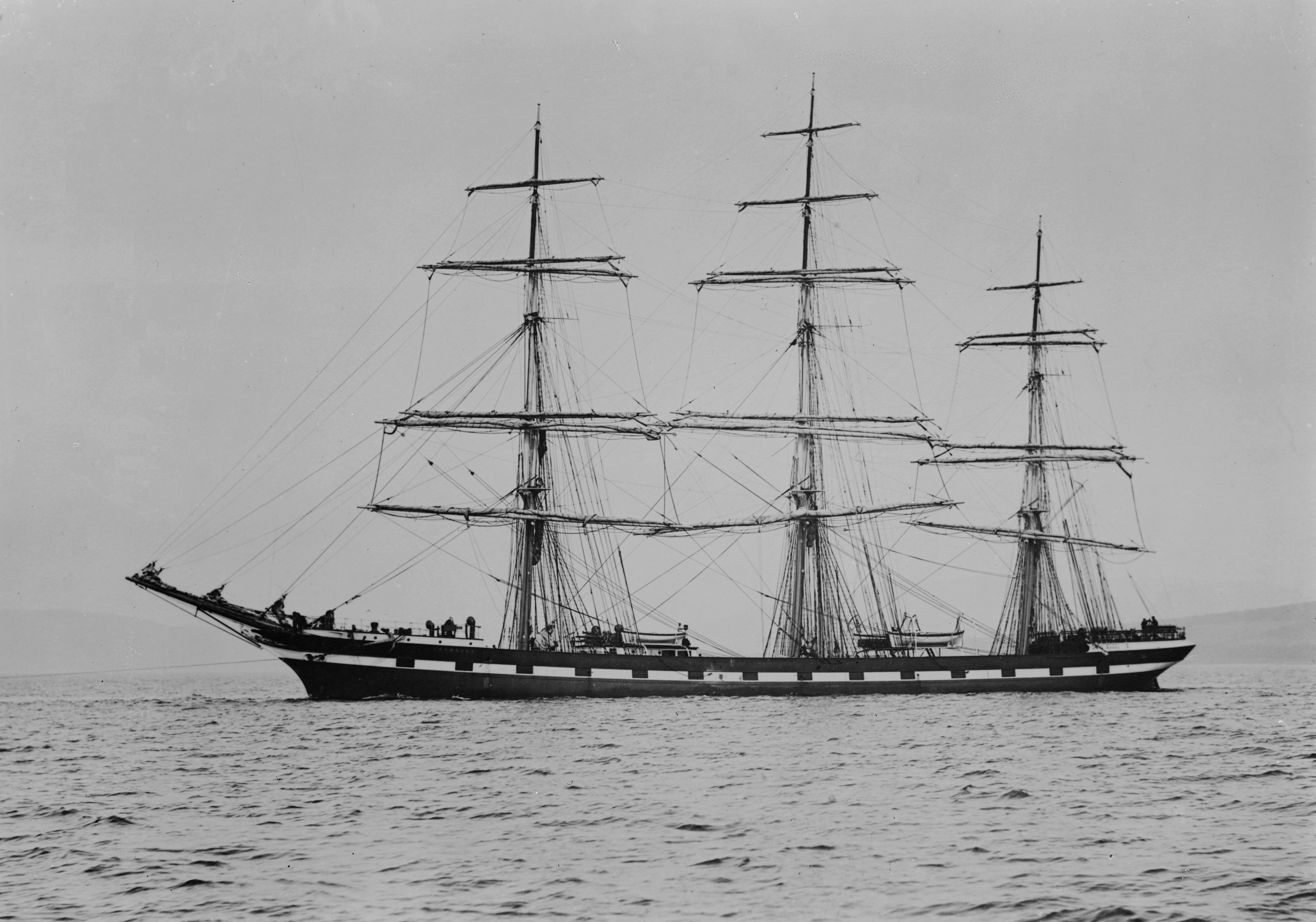
- The Cromdale

History

United Kingdom
- Name: Cromdale
- Builder: Barclay Curle, Glasgow
- Launched: June, 1891
- Fate: Wrecked in 1913

Cromdale was the last clipper ship built for the Australian wool trade. She measured 271 feet (83 m) in length.

== Background ==
The American clipper ship era lasted from 1845 until 1860, shortly before the American Civil War broke out. Meanwhile, British clippers continued to be built into the 1870s before they were shifted into the wool trade. The opening of the Suez Canal in 1869 was the eventual demise of the tea clipper as the shorter route allowed larger cargo ships passage to China. The remaining clippers profited by serving the wool trade as the need for coal hindered steamships from reaching Australian ports. The shift eventually came when steamships became so large that they could hold an ample amount of coal without constantly refueling. By the time of Cromdale's launch in 1891, ocean liners that could carry large numbers of passengers and amounts of cargo had entered the scene.

== History ==
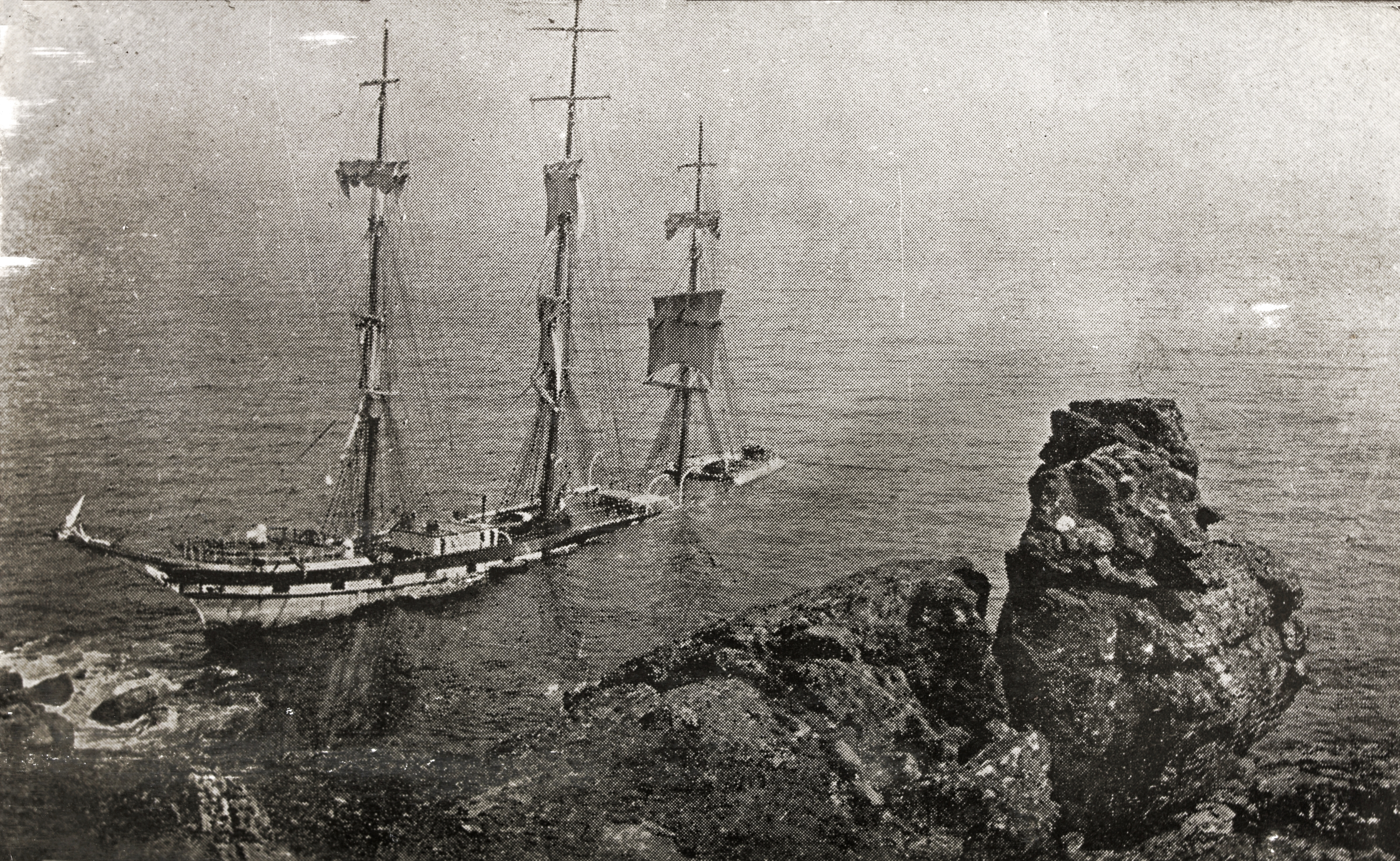
The wreck of the Cromdale

Cromdale was built at Barclay Curle in Glasgow, and launched in June, 1891. She had an identical sister ship named Mount Stewart that was launched a month earlier from the shipyard. These ships had the most modern features of their time in terms of structure and design. The first master of Cromdale was a captain named E.H. Andrew, who was very experienced and up to date on the newest technological features.

She was ultimately lost in 1913 under the command of Captain Arthur while she was homeward bound from Taltal with a cargo of nitrate. Cromdale was 126 days out heading for Falmouth (UK) and had been in dense fog for a few days. While a steamer passed and advised Arthur to alter his course, a light was suddenly seen ahead through the fog shortly afterwards. Arthur tried to turn the ship about but it was too late, and she struck rocks at the foot of a cliff. This cliff was discovered later to be part of Bass Point which is close to Lizard Lighthouse. The lifeboats were ordered lowered immediately due to the damage the ship had endured, but luck was on the side of the crew. The weather was calm, distress rockets were at hand, and rescuers from land arrived shortly to assist. Cromdale was declared a total loss after she settled quickly, and was found to be laying in a position that was exposed to the elements.
