= Osman Duquesnay =

French politician (1846–1923)

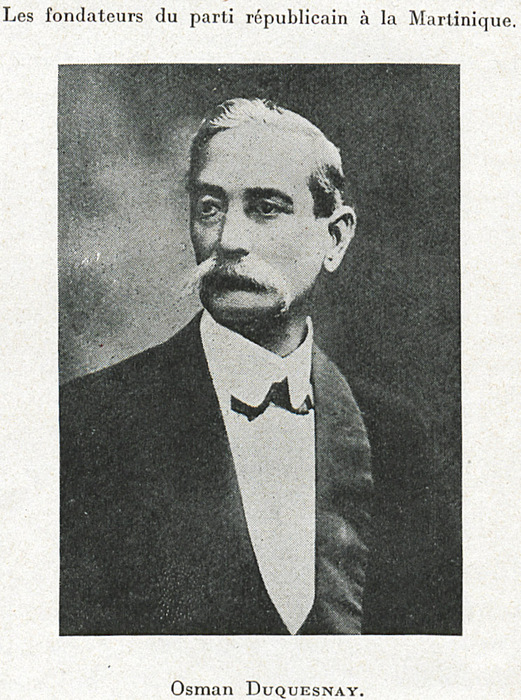

Deputy of the National Assembly
- In office 1906–1910
- In office 1898–1902

Personal details
- Born: Osman Philippe Duquesnay; January 7, 1846 Le Marin, (Martinique)
- Died: December 8, 1923 (aged 77) Le Marin, (Martinique)
- Party: Republican Union (France), (1889-1902)
- Other political affiliations: Républicain radical, (1906-1910)
- Occupation: physician

Osman Duquesnay (7 January 1846 - 8 December 1923) was a French politician and physician. He was deputy of Martinique from 1898 to 1902 and from 1906 to 1910.

== Biography ==
Osman Duquesnay belonged to one of the most prominent wealthy mixed race families of Le Marin in Martinique. His father Jules Duquesnay was mayor of Le Marin from 1851 to 1853 and from 1868 to 1874. Osman Duquesnay studied at the seminary college in Saint-Pierre. After obtaining his baccalaureate, he went to France to study medicine at the University of Montpellier. He interrupted his studies to enlist as a volunteer when the Franco-Prussian War was declared in July 1870. He distinguished himself at the Avron plateau. After the war, he resumed his studies and, after receiving his doctorate in medicine, he returned to Martinique and practised as a doctor.

Duquesnay was a founder of Martinique's republican party along with Marius Hurard and Ernest Deproge. On 21 May 1882, he was elected as a town councillor in Fort-de-France. He was then elected general councillor for the canton of Saint-Pierre-Mouillage.

His fame grew and in 1884 he became vice-president of the general council. At that time, he was very close to the deputy Ernest Deproge and his assimilationist ideas. From 1885 to 1890, he abandoned Saint-Pierre and became interested in two communes: Le Marin, his native commune, and Fort-de-France, where he practised as a doctor. In 1887, he was elected general councillor of Le Marin and in 1888, at the age of 44, he became mayor of the main town, Fort-de-France. Duquesnay was mayor of Fort-de-France from 1888 to 1896. In 1890, he was elected President of the General Council of Martinique, a position he held until 1893.

Between 1890 and 1898, the Republican party, which had been very united until then, experienced a split between its two main figures, Marius Hurard and Ernest Deproge. Duquesnay became closer to the Hurardists and the Békés, or white Creole landowners, who gradually returned to the political arena. One of the consequences of this change of camp was the defeat of Osman Duquesnay in the 1898 municipal elections in Fort-de-France by the Hurardist candidate, Henri Audemar. Despite his defeat in the municipal elections, Osman Duquesnay remained politically active and ambitious. In 1898, Osman Duquesnay ran against his former party friend Ernest Deproge in the legislative elections and inflicted a crushing defeat on him. In the Chamber of Deputies in Paris, he acted in concert with Jean Guibert, for example in protesting bloodshed during strikebreaking in 1900.

In the 1902 legislative elections, he was defeated in the south by the candidate Homère Clément. In 1906, he ran again for the legislative elections and won against Henry Lémery and was a member of René Viviani's group of independent socialists. In 1910, he was defeated in the election of deputies by Victor Sévère in the southern constituency. This failure put an end to his political ambition. From then on, Osman Duquesnay devoted himself to his commune of Le Marin, where he was mayor from 1908 to 1923.

In 1914, during the First World War, Duquesnay devotedly worked as a doctor in a hospital in Thessaloniki, Greece, and then in the Val-de-Grâce hospital in Paris. For his humanitarian action during the First World War he was awarded the médaille militaire with palms and the Chevalier de la Légion d'honneur, received on 20 January 1919. Osman Duquesnay was undoubtedly an important political figure in Martinique at the end of the 19th and beginning of the 20th century.

Osman Duquesnay died in Le Marin on 8 December 1923 at the age of 77.

== Political career ==
- Mayor of Fort-de-France from 1888 to 1896
- Mayor of Le Marin from 1908 to 1923
- President of the General Council of Martinique from 1890 to 1893
- Deputy of Martinique from 1898 to 1902 and 1906 to 1910

== Sources ==
- Micheline Marlin-Godier, Fort-de-France, 1884-1914, Éditions Ibis Rouge
