= Léro =

Léro is a surname. Notable people with the surname include:

- Étienne Léro (1910–1939), French poet
- Jane Léro (1916–1961), Martiniquais feminist and communist activist
- Thélus Léro (1909–1996), Martiniquais politician
- Yva Léro (1912–2007), Martiniquais painter and writer

== See also ==
- Leroy (name)
