= Gaulois =

Gaulois may refer to:

- French word for a person from Gaul
- Gaulois language
- Le Gaulois (1868–1929), a right-wing French newspaper
- French ship Gaulois
  - French ship Gaulois (1812)
  - French battleship Gaulois (1896–1916)

== See also ==
- Gauloise (disambiguation)
- La Gauloise (disambiguation)
