= Lero =

Lero or variations can refer to:

== People ==
- Léro, surname
- Magne Lerø (born 1954), Norwegian publisher and magazine editor
- Toribia Lero, Bolivian politician

== Other uses ==
- Lero (god), eponymous Celtic god associated with the Lérins Islands, Provence, France
- Lero (software engineering), research center in Ireland
- Leros (called "Lero" in Italian), island in the South Aegean Region, Greece

== See also ==
- AS Lero, Timorese football club
- FC Lero, Timorese football club
- Lero-Lero, 2013 studio album by Luísa Maita
- The Lero-Lero Family, 1953 Brazilian comedy film
