= French ship Trajan =

French ship Trajan may refer to:

- French ship Trajan (1792)
- French ship Trajan (1811)
