= La Gauloise =

La Gauloise may refer to:

- La Gauloise de Basse-Terre, a football club in Guadeloupe
- La Gauloise de Trinité, a multi-sport club in Martinique
  - La Gauloise de Trinité (football), a football section of La Gauloise de Trinité

== See also ==
- Gauloise (disambiguation)
- Gaulois (disambiguation)
