= Olivier Rambo =

Martinique-born French footballer (born 1974)

Personal information
- Full name: Olivier Rambo
- Date of birth: 8 September 1974 (age 52)
- Place of birth: La Trinité, Martinique, France
- Height: 1.72 m (5 ft 8 in)
- Position: Midfielder

Team information
- Current team: Illzach Modenheim

Senior career*
Years	Team	Apps	(Gls)
1993–2005	Nancy	269	(28)
2005–2006	Toulon	21	(1)
2006–	Illzach Modenheim	?	(?)
- * Club domestic league appearances and goals

Olivier Rambo (born 8 September 1974) is a French footballer who currently plays as an attacking midfielder for AS Illzach Modenheim. While playing for AS Nancy he made 78 appearances in Ligue 1, the highest tier of French football.
