= French ship Gaulois =

Several ships of the French Navy have borne the name Gaulois ("Gaul"):

== Ships named Gaulois ==
- Gaulois (1797), a Téméraire-class ship of the line launched as Trajan in 1792 and renamed 1797
- Gaulois (1812), 74-gun ship of the line.
- Gaulois, a Charlemagne-class pre-dreadnought battleship
Ships of the French Navy named Gaulois
Battleship Gaulois

== Notes and references ==
=== Bibliography ===
- Roche, Jean-Michel (2005). Dictionnaire des bâtiments de la flotte de guerre française de Colbert à nos jours. Vol. 1. Group Retozel-Maury Millau. pp. 372–373. ISBN 978-2-9525917-0-6. OCLC 165892922.
- Roche, Jean-Michel (2005). Dictionnaire des bâtiments de la flotte de guerre française de Colbert à nos jours. Vol. 2. Group Retozel-Maury Millau. p. 250. ISBN 978-2-9525917-0-6. OCLC 165892922.
