= Malick Bolivard =

Martiniquais footballer (born 1987)

Personal information
- Full name: Malick Bolivard
- Date of birth: 17 June 1987 (age 39)
- Place of birth: La Trinité, Martinique
- Height: 1.91 m (6 ft 3 in)
- Position: Forward

Youth career
- 1997–2000: Amicate Antillaise
- 2000–2002: FC Chartres
- 2002–2004: CS Sedan Ardennes
- 2004–2005: Tours FC

Senior career*
Years	Team	Apps	(Gls)
2005–2006	SM Caen B	1	(1)
2007	LB Châteauroux B	17	(0)
2007–2009	Hertha BSC II	48	(8)
2009–2011	Hansa Rostock	13	(0)
2009–2011	Hansa Rostock II	24	(3)
2011	SV Babelsberg 03	6	(1)
2012–2013	Torgelower FC Greif	7	(0)
2013–2014	Germania Halberstadt	41	(3)
2014–2016	FC Wegberg-Beeck	23	(2)
- * Club domestic league appearances and goals as of 1 January 2016

Malick Bolivard (born 17 June 1987) is a former Martiniquais professional footballer.
