= La Trinité, Martinique =

La Trinité
- Subprefecture and commune
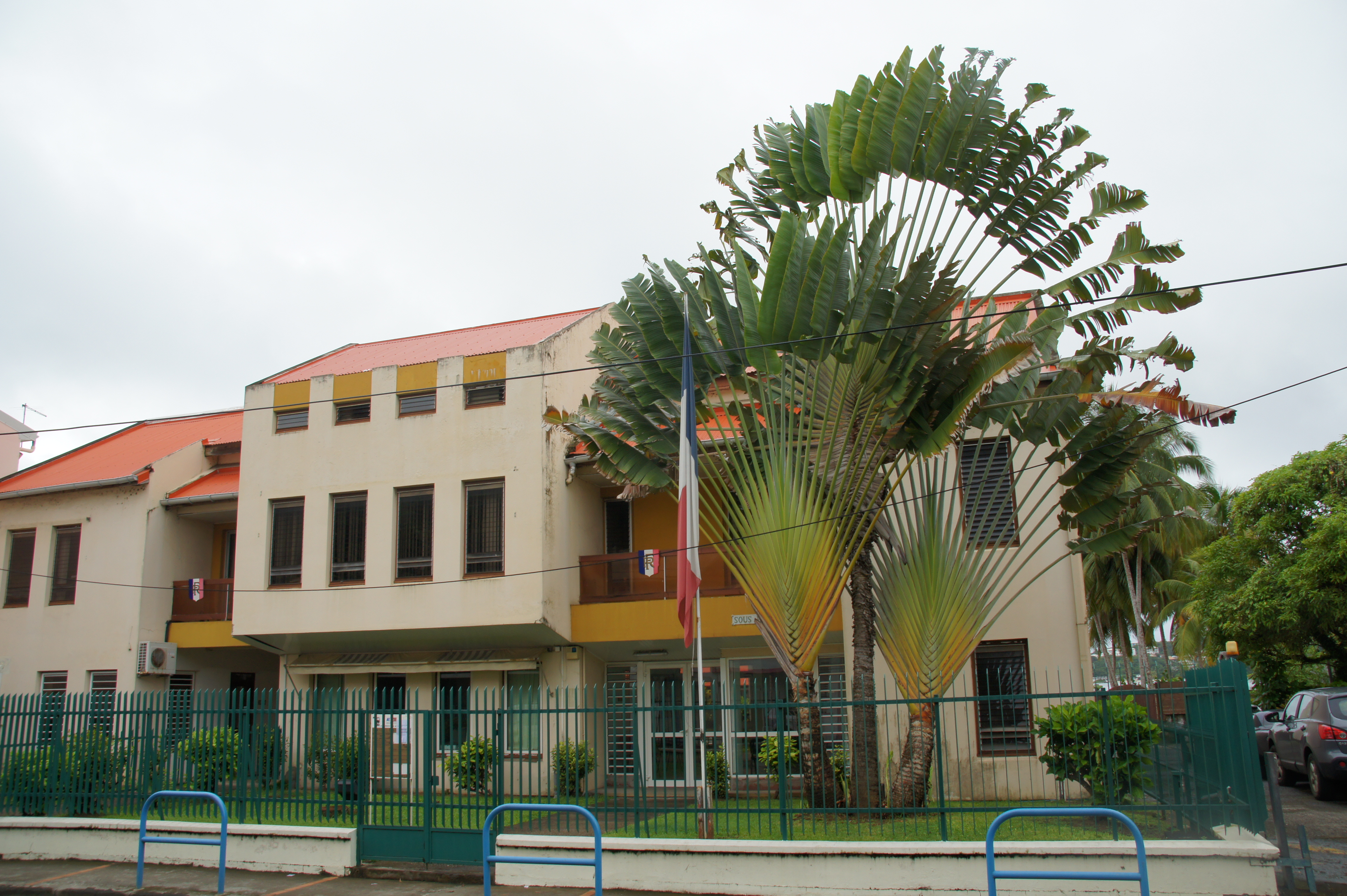
- The sub-prefecture of La Trinité

- Coat of arms

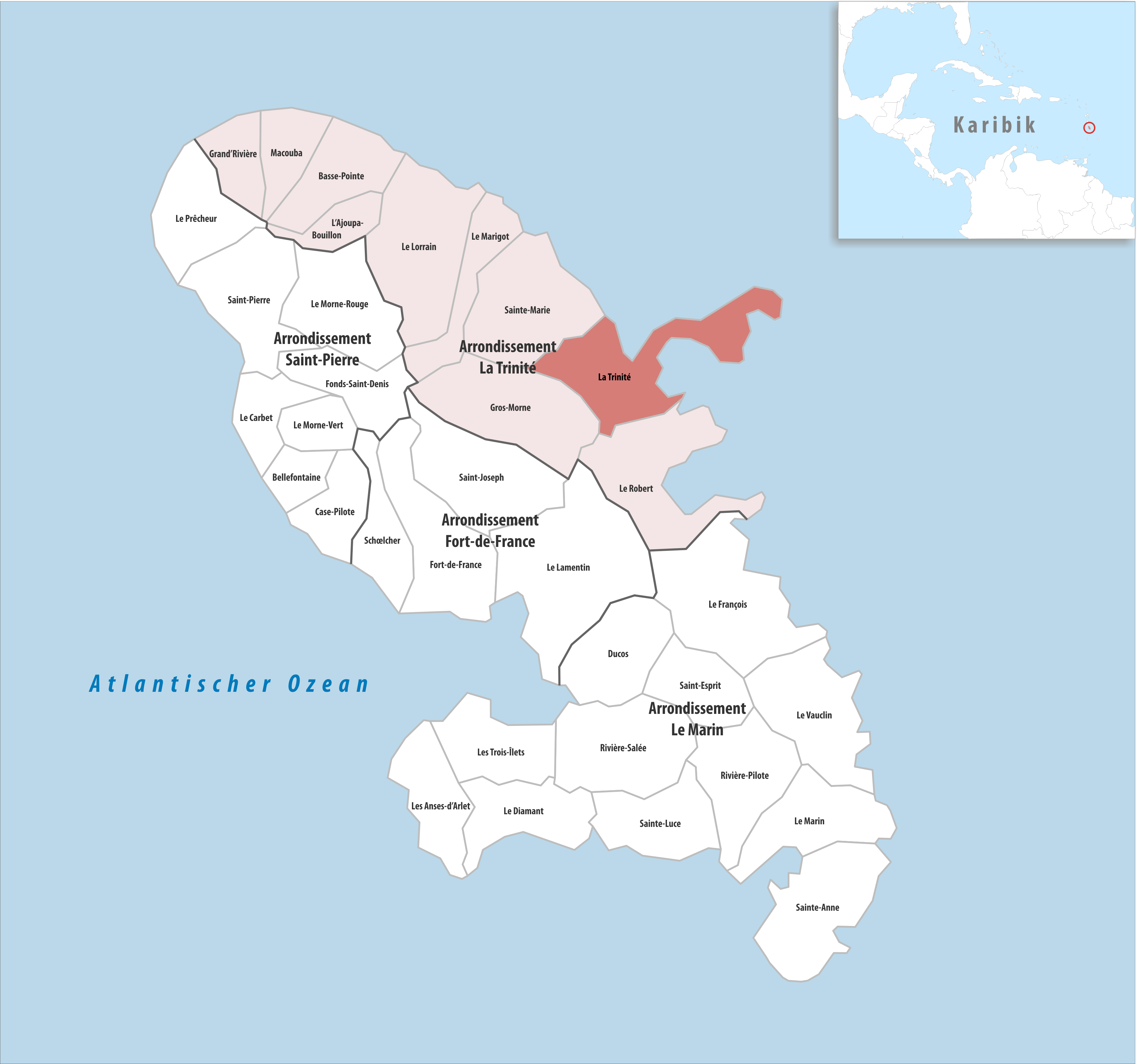
- Location of the commune (in red) within Martinique
- Location of La Trinité
- Coordinates: 14°44′N 60°58′W
- Country: France
- Overseas region and department: Martinique
- Arrondissement: La Trinité
- Intercommunality: CA Pays Nord Martinique

Government
  - Mayor (2023–2026): Patricia Telle
- Area^{1}: 45.77 km^{2} (17.67 sq mi)
- Elevation: 610 m (2,000 ft)
- Highest elevation: 285 m (935 ft)
- Lowest elevation: 0 m (0 ft)
- Population (2023): 11,454
  - Density: 250.3/km^{2} (648.1/sq mi)
- Time zone: UTC−04:00 (AST)
- INSEE/Postal code: 97230 /97220
- ^{1} French Land Register data, which excludes lakes, ponds, glaciers > 1 km^{2} (0.386 sq mi or 247 acres) and river estuaries.

La Trinité (French pronunciation: [la tʁinite], literally The Trinity; Martinican Creole: Twinité) is a town and commune in the French overseas region and department of Martinique.

== Geography ==
=== Climate ===
La Trinité has a tropical rainforest climate (Köppen climate classification Af). The average annual temperature in La Trinité is 26.4 °C (79.5 °F). The average annual rainfall is 2,294.8 mm (90.35 in) with October as the wettest month. The temperatures are highest on average in September, at around 27.6 °C (81.7 °F), and lowest in February, at around 25.0 °C (77.0 °F). The highest temperature ever recorded in La Trinité was 34.4 °C (93.9 °F) on 25 September 2011; the coldest temperature ever recorded was 18.7 °C (65.7 °F) on 2 February 2008.

Climate data for La Trinité (1991−2020 normals, extremes 2003−present)
Month	Jan	Feb	Mar	Apr	May	Jun	Jul	Aug	Sep	Oct	Nov	Dec	Year
Record high °C (°F)	30.2 (86.4)	32.3 (90.1)	32.0 (89.6)	31.3 (88.3)	32.7 (90.9)	31.8 (89.2)	31.4 (88.5)	34.1 (93.4)	34.4 (93.9)	33.5 (92.3)	31.6 (88.9)	31.6 (88.9)	34.4 (93.9)
Mean daily maximum °C (°F)	27.7 (81.9)	27.8 (82.0)	28.1 (82.6)	28.7 (83.7)	29.2 (84.6)	29.4 (84.9)	29.5 (85.1)	30.1 (86.2)	30.6 (87.1)	30.1 (86.2)	29.2 (84.6)	28.4 (83.1)	29.1 (84.4)
Daily mean °C (°F)	25.1 (77.2)	25.0 (77.0)	25.3 (77.5)	26.0 (78.8)	26.6 (79.9)	26.9 (80.4)	27.0 (80.6)	27.4 (81.3)	27.6 (81.7)	27.1 (80.8)	26.5 (79.7)	25.8 (78.4)	26.4 (79.5)
Mean daily minimum °C (°F)	22.5 (72.5)	22.3 (72.1)	22.6 (72.7)	23.2 (73.8)	24.0 (75.2)	24.5 (76.1)	24.5 (76.1)	24.7 (76.5)	24.6 (76.3)	24.2 (75.6)	23.8 (74.8)	23.2 (73.8)	23.7 (74.7)
Record low °C (°F)	20.2 (68.4)	18.7 (65.7)	19.0 (66.2)	20.1 (68.2)	21.1 (70.0)	21.5 (70.7)	21.1 (70.0)	21.4 (70.5)	21.5 (70.7)	20.7 (69.3)	20.2 (68.4)	20.2 (68.4)	18.7 (65.7)
Average precipitation mm (inches)	125.8 (4.95)	99.1 (3.90)	101.7 (4.00)	203.2 (8.00)	203.4 (8.01)	172.6 (6.80)	201.1 (7.92)	210.7 (8.30)	204.6 (8.06)	322.2 (12.69)	293.5 (11.56)	156.9 (6.18)	2,294.8 (90.35)
Average precipitation days (≥ 1.0 mm)	19.3	15.1	14.2	14.2	15.6	17.3	21.8	20.5	17.7	21.2	20.2	18.3	215.4
Source: Météo-France

== Population ==
Historical population
Year	Pop.	±% p.a.
1967	9,545	—
1974	10,632	+1.55%
1982	10,087	−0.66%
1990	11,090	+1.19%
1999	12,890	+1.69%
2007	13,582	+0.66%
2012	13,352	−0.34%
2017	12,243	−1.72%
2023	11,454	−1.10%
Source: INSEE

== Sport ==
La Gauloise de Trinité is a multi-sport club in La Trinité.

== Notable people ==
- David Alerte (born 1984), Olympic athlete
- Christian André (born 1950), association footballer
- Bruno Nestor Azerot (born 1961), politician, served in the French National Assembly as deputy of Martinique's 2nd constituency from 2012-2018
- Coralie Balmy (born 1987), Olympic swimmer
- Malick Bolivard (born 1987), association footballer
- Paul Chillan (1935-2021), association footballer
- Homère Clément (1852–1923), physician and politician, served in the French National Assembly as deputy of Martinique from 1902-1906
- Jeffrey Dalmat (born 1991), basketball player
- Lénora Guion-Firmin (born 1991), athlete
- Joan Hartock (born 1987), association footballer
- Jacques Laposte (born 1952), association footballer
- Yva Léro (1912–2007), writer and painter
- Audrick Linord (born 1987), association footballer
- Louis-Joseph Manscour (born 1945), politician, served in the French National Assembly as deputy of Martinique's 1st constituency from 2002-2012; member of the European Parliament from 2014-2019
- Guy-Marc Michel (born 1988), basketball player
- Dominique Pandor (born 1993), association footballer
- Patrick Gilles Percin (born 1976), association footballer
- Katty Piejos (born 1981), handball player
- Olivier Rambo (born 1974), association footballer
- David Regis (born 1935), association footballer
- Auguste Rejon (1893-1973), politician, elected to the French Senate in 1958
- Cédric Sorhaindo (born 1984), Olympic handball player

== See also ==
- Communes of the Martinique department
