= Gauloise =

Gauloise may refer to:

- The French name for someone from Gaul
- Gauloises, cigarettes
- French ironclad Gauloise
- a range of Belgian beers, brewed by Brasserie du Bocq

== See also ==
- Gaulois (disambiguation)
- La Gauloise (disambiguation)
