= Le Samouraï =

1967 neo-noir crime film

- Theatrical release poster
- Directed by: Jean-Pierre Melville
- Screenplay by: Jean-Pierre Melville; Georges Pellegrin
- Produced by: Raymond Borderie; Eugène Lépicier
- Starring: Alain Delon; François Périer; Nathalie Delon; Cathy Rosier
- Cinematography: Henri Decaë
- Edited by: Monique Bonnot; Yolande Maurette
- Music by: François de Roubaix
- Production companies: Filmel; Compagnie Industrielle et Commerciale Cinématographique (CICC); Fida Cinematografica; T.C. Productions
- Distributed by: S.N. Prodis (France); Fida Cinematografica (Italy)
- Release date: 25 October 1967
- Running time: 105 minutes
- Countries: France; Italy
- Language: French
- Box office: 1.9 million admissions (France) $218,495 (US re-release)

Le Samouraï (French pronunciation: [lə sa.mu.ʁa.i]; lit. 'The Samurai') is a 1967 neo-noir crime thriller film written and directed by Jean-Pierre Melville and starring Alain Delon, François Périer, Nathalie Delon, and Cathy Rosier. A Franco-Italian production, it depicts the intersecting paths of a professional hitman (Delon) trying to find out who hired him for a job and then tried to have him killed, and the Parisian commissaire (Périer) trying to catch him.

The film was released on 25 October 1967, and it sold over 1.9 million tickets in France. It received positive reviews, with particular praise given to Melville's screenwriting and atmospheric direction, and Delon's performance. An English-dubbed version of the film was released in the U.S. in 1972 as The Godson.

The film has come to be regarded as widely influential, particularly among the crime thriller genre, with many New Hollywood films containing explicit references to Le Samourai as well as the protagonist played by Delon.

== Plot ==
Impassive hitman Jef Costello lives in a spartan single-room Paris apartment and keeps a small bird in a cage as a pet. His methodical modus operandi involves creating airtight alibis, including ones provided by his lover, Jane. After carrying out a contract killing on Martey, a nightclub owner, Jef is clearly seen leaving the scene by the club's piano player, Valérie, and glimpsed by several other witnesses. The police bring Jef and other suspects in for an identity parade but the witnesses, including Valérie, fail to positively identify him.

Jef is released, but the commissaire suspects him and has him followed. Jef loses the tail and goes to collect his fee for the hit. Instead of paying him, the man he meets tries to kill him, shooting him in the arm. Jef realises that his unknown employers now view him as a liability because he is suspected in Martey's murder. After treating his wound, Jef returns to the nightclub. While he is out, two police officers bug his room, agitating the bird in its cage.

After the nightclub closes, Jef has Valérie take him to her home, reasoning that she did not identify him as the killer because his employer had told her not to. He asks her who hired him, and she tells him to call her in two hours. The police search Jane's apartment and offer to leave her alone if she recants her alibi for Jef. She flatly rejects the offer.

Back at his apartment, Jef notices some loose feathers scattered around his bird's cage and suspects it was agitated by an intrusion. He finds the police bug and deactivates it and then goes to a public phone to call Valérie but she does not answer. When he returns home, he is ambushed by the man who shot him. Holding Jef at gunpoint, the man offers a fresh start. He pays Jef for the hit on Martey, as well as for an upcoming one. Jef overpowers the man and forces him to disclose the identity of his boss: Olivier Rey.

Dozens of undercover police attempt to tail Jef in the Paris Métro but he evades them. He visits Jane and assures her everything will work out, then drives to Rey's house, which is the same home Valérie took him to earlier in the film, though she is not there. Jef kills Rey and returns to the nightclub, this time making no attempt to avoid being seen. He checks his hat, but leaves his hat-check ticket on the counter, and puts on white gloves, which he wears when carrying out his hits, in full view of everyone. He approaches the stage where Valérie is performing. She quietly advises him to leave but he points his gun at her. Strangely unafraid, she asks him why he is doing this and he responds he was paid to. Suddenly, Jef is shot four times by policemen who have been waiting for him. When the Commissaire inspects Jef's gun, he discovers it was unloaded.

== Cast ==
- Alain Delon as Jef Costello
- François Périer as the Commissaire
- Nathalie Delon as Jane Lagrange, Jef and Wiener's girlfriend
- Cathy Rosier (credited as Caty Rosier) as Valérie, the pianist at Martey's
- Jacques Leroy as "The Man on the Bridge", a hitman working for Rey
- Michel Boisrond as Wiener, Jane's wealthy boyfriend
- Robert Favart as the bartender at Martey's, who is a witness at the lineup
- Jean-Pierre Posier as Olivier Rey, who has Martey killed
- Catherine Jourdan as the hatcheck girl at Martey's, who is a witness at the lineup
- Roger Fradet as a police inspector who works for the Commissaire
- Carlo Nell as a police inspector who works for the Commissaire
- Robert Rondo as a police inspector who works for the Commissaire
- André Salgues as the man in the garage who gives Jef his contracts
- André Thorent as the policeman disguised as a taxi driver who follows Jef when he is released from custody
- Jacques Deschamps as the policeman at the microphone during the lineup
- Georges Casati as Ange Séraphin Damolini, the first suspect in the lineup
- Jack Léonard as Juan Garcia, the second suspect in the lineup
- Pierre Vaudier as the policeman who bugs Jef's apartment
- Maurice Magalon as the partner of the policeman who bugs Jef's apartment
- Gaston Meunier as the head waiter at Martey's, who is a witness at the lineup
- Jean Gold as a customer at Martey's who is a witness at the lineup
- Georges Billy as a customer at Martey's who is a witness at the lineup
- Ari Aricardi as a poker player
- Guy Bonnafoux as a poker player
- Humberto Catalano as a police inspector
- Carl Lechner as a suspect who looks very similar to Jef
- Maria Maneva as "the girl with chewing gum" who follows Jef in the subway

== Production ==
Melville wrote the film for Delon. It was the first film for Delon's wife, Nathalie. He filed for divorce after the film wrapped, but they terminated the divorce proceedings a few days later, though they separated in June 1968 and their divorce became official in February 1969, with Nathalie being granted custody of their son, Anthony. François Périer, who played the Commissaire, was a comedian cast against type.

Studios Jenner, Melville's private film studio, was destroyed by a fire on June 29, 1967, while Le Samouraï was in production. Melville, who termed the blaze "suspicious", finished the shoot at another studio.

== Alternative ending ==
In an interview with Rui Nogueira, Melville said he originally filmed Jef Costello meeting his death with a picture-perfect grin, but he modified the scene after discovering Delon had a smiling death scene in another of his films. Production stills of the smiling death exist.

== Release and reception ==
=== Box office ===
Le Samouraï was released in France on 25 October 1967. It sold over 1.9 million tickets in France, and over 797,011 tickets in Spain. First released in theaters in the United States in 1972, it grossed $39,481 from a 1997 re-release.

=== Critical response ===
On Rotten Tomatoes, the film has a 92% approval rating based on 51 reviews, and an average score of 8.7/10; the site's "critics consensus" reads: "Le Samouraï makes the most of its spare aesthetic, using stylish – and influential – direction, solid performances, and thick atmosphere to weave an absorbing story." Metacritic, which uses a weighted average, assigned the film a score of 90 out of 100, based on 21 critics, indicating "universal acclaim".

A 1967 review in Variety called the film "a curious hybrid" that "appears a bit too solemn to inject all the suspense, action and characterization [Melville] seeks", and said it "almost seems to be an American film dubbed into French" and "could be cut a bit".

Vincent Canby of The New York Times called the original film "immaculate", but criticized the dubbing of the 1972 version released in the U.S. as The Godson as "disorienting" and "dreadful".

In a 1997 review of the film that later appeared in his first The Great Movies collection of essays, Roger Ebert gave the film four out of four stars, writing: "Like a painter or a musician, a filmmaker can suggest complete mastery with just a few strokes. Jean-Pierre Melville involves us in the spell of Le Samourai (1967) before a word is spoken. He does it with light: a cold light, like dawn on an ugly day. And color: grays and blues. And actions that speak in place of words."

In 2010, the film was ranked No. 39 on Empire's list of "The 100 Best Films of World Cinema".

Writing in Le Figaro of the Delons' performances after Nathalie's death in 2021, Bertrand Guyard noted that the husband and wife are both nearly silent in the film, but "their gazes, fraught with meaning, are enough to make the camera quiver", and the director was able to create from their portrayals "a mythical couple of the seventh art."

== Influence and legacy ==
Stephen Teo calls Le Samouraï "possibly the most influential French crime thriller ever made, a mixture of a police procedural (le film policier) and a suspenseful action thriller concentrated on a professional hit man, Jef (spelled with one "f") Costello, played by Alain Delon, giving the definitive performance of his career".

The film has influenced numerous other works and directors:

- The German film Liebe ist kälter als der Tod pays tribute to French cinema masters such as Claude Chabrol and Éric Rohmer. Furthermore, the directing style is inspired by Melville's Le Samouraï, while the artwork on the poster resembles the silhouette of Alain Delon in Le Samouraï. The character Bruno (Ulli Lommel) is also inspired by the character portrayed by Delon.
- The character of Jef Costello, portrayed by Delon in Le Samouraï (1967), had a major impact on Fernando Di Leo and his Milieu Trilogy (Caliber 9, The Italian Connection, Il Boss).
- Luc Besson drew inspiration from Jef Costello (played by Delon in Le Samouraï) to create Léon, the titular character embodied by Jean Reno in Léon: The Professional.
- Richard Ayoade cites The Samurai as a major inspiration for his films. In Submarine, Oliver Tate's character wears the same costume as Delon in The Samurai and displays a poster of the film in his room, out of admiration for the character he plays. Some scenes in the film are directly inspired by the French classic.
- Fabio Grassadonia and Antonio Piazza, in Salvo, sought to recreate the aura of French film noir. Their choice of Saleh Bakri to play Salvo, a Sicilian hitman, stemmed from this vision: “We wanted a strong physical presence that would dominate the screen with charisma, thinking of Jean-Pierre Melville, French film noir, and actors like Alain Delon.”
- The overall atmosphere, character development, and narrative style of the American film The French Connection are largely influenced by Le Samouraï (1967) by Jean-Pierre Melville. William Friedkin also drew inspiration from the character played by Alain Delon—a solitary and methodical hitman—to shape the character of Popeye Doyle (Gene Hackman). Moreover, the subway chase scene in The French Connection is directly inspired by Bullitt and Le Samouraï.
- While Francis Ford Coppola’s The Conversation is rooted in the paranoia and technological anxieties of the 1970s, its lead character, Harry Caul (Gene Hackman), shares striking similarities with Jef Costello (Alain Delon), the taciturn hitman of Le Samouraï. Like Costello, Harry Caul is a man of meticulous habits, defined more by his actions than his words. Their lives are austere, defined by routine and isolation.
- Through his portrayal of Jef Costello, Alain Delon established the archetype of the "silent and stoic antihero." Ryan O'Neal's character in The Driver is almost entirely based on Jef Costello. The Driver is also considered an unofficial adaptation of Le Samouraï.
- Scorsese also noted that Jef Costello, played by Delon in Le Samouraï, served as an inspiration for the creation of Travis Bickle, the protagonist of Taxi Driver (a role that was offered to Alain Delon).
- Le Samouraï is one of Quentin Tarantino’s favorite films. The French classic influenced his creation of the world of Reservoir Dogs and Pulp Fiction. In this regard, the costume design for Reservoir Dogs and Pulp Fiction stemmed from a discussion between Tarantino and costume designer Betsy Heimann about French noir films featuring Alain Delon.
- Michael Mann, for Heat (just like for Collateral), creates the character of Neil McCauley, played by Robert De Niro, drawing inspiration from the minimalist and detached style of Delon in Le Samouraï. The line "I am alone, not lonely" from McCauley (De Niro in Heat) directly echoes the one from Jef Costello (Delon in Le Samouraï) : "I never lose, never really".
- Ronin’s narrative structure owes a debt to Le Samouraï. While Ronin revolves around a heist, its heart lies in the psychological and moral dilemmas of its protagonist. Sam (Robert De Niro), like Jef, operates in a world of deception and shifting allegiances, where trust is scarce and survival depends on foresight and adaptability.
- In Ghost Dog: The Way of the Samurai by Jim Jarmusch, film’s ending openly pays homage to Le Samouraï, as both Alain Delon and Ghost Dog carry an unloaded firearm in a scenario where they are fully aware of their impending fate. Forest Whitaker also drew inspiration from Delon’s role as Jef Costello in Le Samouraï for his performance : “As part of my preparation, I watched this masterpiece with Alain Delon. Thanks to him, I understood the virtue of silence.”
- To prepare for his role as Vincent in Collateral, Tom Cruise stated that he “first watched several films about professional killers, including Le Samouraï by Jean-Pierre Melville with Alain Delon. I was [Tom Cruise] deeply fascinated by his solitary and melancholic charisma in carrying out his ruthless business.” Cruise’s appearance and demeanor in the film strongly recall Jef Costello from Le Samouraï.
- The film by Anton Corbijn, The American (inspired by Melville's Le Samouraï) stars George Clooney as an assassin, who resembles Costello.
- In Drive by Nicolas Winding Refn and Baby Driver by Edgar Wright, both directors drew inspiration from Le Samouraï, crafting protagonists—played by Ryan Gosling and Ansel Elgort, respectively—who are taciturn yet charismatic getaway drivers, reminiscent of Jef Costello. Ryan Gosling has stated that his acting in Drive was influenced by Delon’s performance in Le Samouraï .
- In developing The Equalizer film franchise, director Antoine Fuqua acknowledged that Delon influenced the character of Robert McCall, a solitary man with strong moral motivations who acts as a vigilante for those unable to defend themselves. Played by Denzel Washington, Fuqua explained: “My biggest inspirations were foreign films from the 1970s, really […]. And of course, all those Alain Delon films, particularly the French ones, like Le Samouraï (1967), with that kind of slow rhythm and character development as the story unfolds. That’s the kind of film that inspires me.”
- Chad Stahelski, the director behind the John Wick franchise, is also a great admirer of Alain Delon and Jean-Pierre Melville. Stahelski drew inspiration from Le Cercle Rouge and Le Samouraï when crafting John Wick : "The John Wick films are all love letters from Keanu, myself, our stunt team and our creative team to everyone from Wong Kar-wai to Sammo Hung to Sergio Leone, Kurosawa, Alain Delon and "The Samurai", Spielberg, Tarantino... To all those people we loved growing up."
- In The Killer, Michael Fassbender and David Fincher are inspired by the character played by Alain Delon in Melville's The Samurai.
- Jon Watts (director of the Spider-Man trilogy) cites The Samurai among his influences, which he considers a model of "lone wolf movies", inspiring the creation of the characters of George Clooney and Brad Pitt in Wolfs.
- In the 2024 remake of The Killer, John Woo pays explicit tribute to Delon by setting the action in Paris.
- Chow Yun-Fat, in John Woo’s The Killer, does not merely reprise Alain Delon’s role in Le Samouraï; he embodies a character who dreams of being Alain Delon.
- Tony Leung, in his role as the undercover inspector in Hard Boiled, adopts characteristics reminiscent of Delon’s Le Samouraï. His character is even named after Alain Delon—he is called Alan.
- Johnnie To’s films frequently pay homage to Melville’s work, with Fulltime Killer and Vengeance serving as notable examples. Although Delon ultimately declined the lead role in Vengeance, To retained the character Francis Costello—his name a direct reference to Jef Costello from Le Samouraï.
- The protagonist of A Bittersweet Life, named "Jeff" after Costello, is a direct descendant of Jef Costello, sharing the same traits as the betrayed, solitary assassin.
- In Pang Ho-Cheung’s comedy You Shoot, I Shoot, Eric Kot plays a hitman who idolizes Jef Costello, dressing like him and even speaking to a Le Samouraï movie poster in his apartment.
- South Korean actor Jung Woo Sung also drew inspiration from Alain Delon’s performance in Le Samouraï for his first criminal role in Cold Eyes.
- Adilkhan Yerzhanov's 2020 film Yellow Cat features a protagonist who quotes and performs scenes from Le Samouraï throughout the film as a major character trait.
- Madonna's 2012 song "Beautiful Killer" is an homage to Alain Delon and alludes to his role in Le Samouraï with the lines: "You are a beautiful killer / I like your silhouette when you stand on the streets / Like a samurai you can handle the heat / Makes me wanna pray for a haunted man."

== See also ==
- List of films featuring surveillance
