= Cathy Rosier =

French actress and model (1945–2004)

Cathy Rosier (2 January 1945 – 17 May 2004) was a French model and actress.

== Life ==
Rosier was born on 2 January 1945 in Martinique, French West Indies. She was the daughter of the Martiniquais writer and painter Yva (née de Montaigne) and her husband, politician and mathematics instructor Thélus Léro. She is perhaps best known for her role as the pianist Valerie in Jean-Pierre Melville's Le Samouraï (1967).

She also released her own musical album, entitled Cathy Banana.

Rosier died on 17 May 2004 in Marrakesh, Morocco, from a ruptured aorta.
