= Cédric Sorhaindo =

French handball player (born 1984)

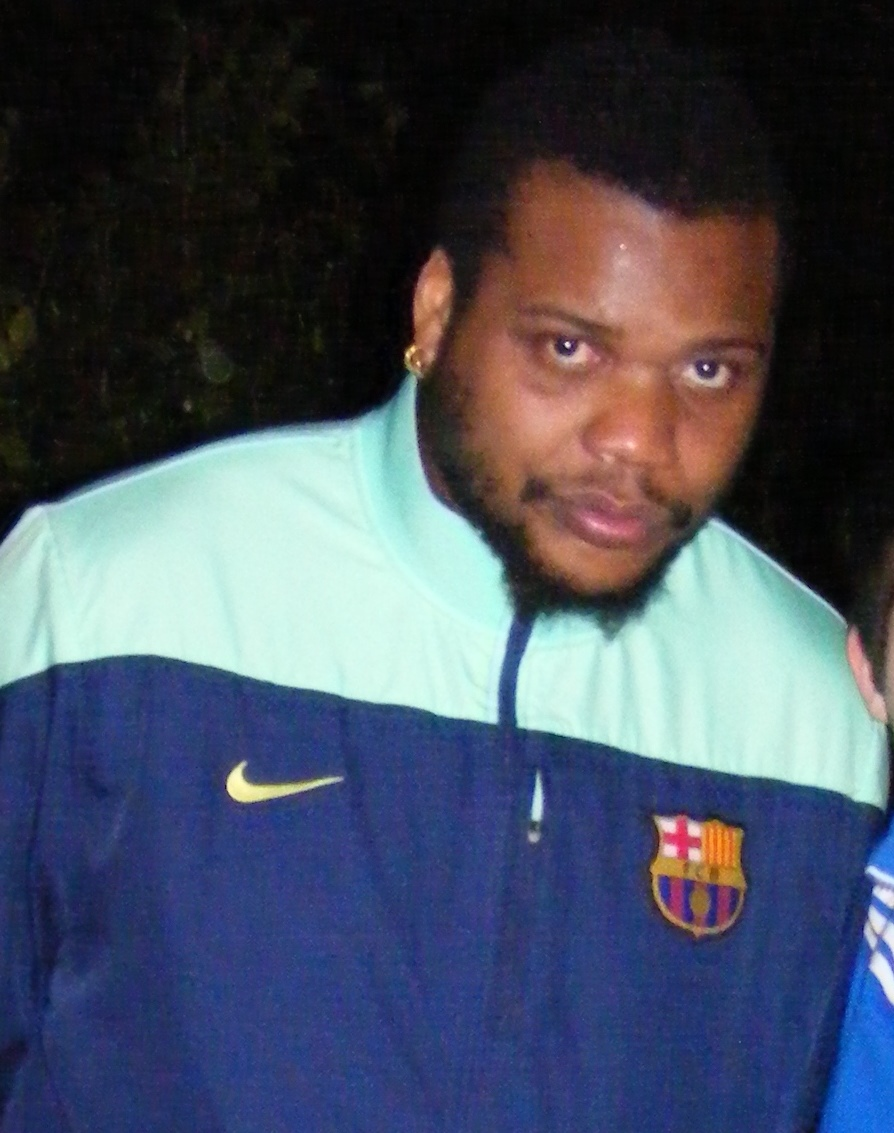

Personal information
- Nationality: French
- Born: 7 June 1984 (age 42) La Trinité, Martinique
- Height: 1.92 m (6 ft 4 in)

Sport
- Sport: Handball
- Position: Pivot
- Current club: Beşiktaş
- Number: 91

Senior clubs
- Years: Team
- 1999–2001: La Gauloise de Trinité
- 2001–2004: Angers HBC
- 2004–2009: Paris Saint-Germain
- 2010: Fenix Toulouse
- 2010–2021: FC Barcelona
- 2021–2023: Dinamo București
- 2024–: Beşiktaş
National team
Years	Team	Apps	(Gls)
2005–2020	France	220	(425)
Medal record
Olympic Games
Gold medal – first place	2012 London	Team
Silver medal – second place	2016 Rio de Janeiro	Team
World Championship
Gold medal – first place	2009 Croatia
Gold medal – first place	2011 Sweden
Gold medal – first place	2015 Qatar
Gold medal – first place	2017 France
Bronze medal – third place	2019 Germany/Denmark
European Championship
Gold medal – first place	2010 Austria
Gold medal – first place	2014 Denmark
Bronze medal – third place	2018 Croatia

Cédric Sorhaindo (born 7 June 1984) is a French handball player for Beşiktaş and previously the French national team, which he captained.

On 30 April 2023 he was included in the French handball hall of fame.

== Club career ==
From 1999 to 2001 he played for La Gauloise de Trinité in Martinique. He then joined Angers Noyant. In 2004 he joined Paris HB. Here he played in the EHF Champions League in 2006, the EHF Cup in 2005 and 2007, and the EHF Cup Winners' Cup in 2008 and 2009. He then joined Toulouse Handball in 2010.

In 2010 Sorhaindo joined FC Barcelona, where he won 3 EHF Champions League titles (2011, 2015 and 2021) and 11 Liga ASOBAL titles, as well as the Supercopa ASOBAL and Copa del Rey de Balonmano. In 2021 he joined Dinamo București. Here he won the 2022 and 2023 Romanian Championship and the 2022 Romanian Cup. In February 2024 he joined Turkish side Beşiktaş.

== National team ==
Sorhaindo debuted for the French National Team on 26 October 2005 against Spain.

He won with the France national team gold medals at the 2012 Summer Olympics, the 2009 World Men's Handball Championship in Croatia and the 2015 World Handball Championships in Qatar. He also won two European championships in 2010 and 2014.

At the 2016 Olympics he won silver medals, losing to Denmark in the final. At this occasion he was part of the tournament all-star team.

In 2017 he was named captain of the French national team, succeeding Thierry Omeyer. In February 2020 he announced his retirement from the national team, having played 220 games and scored 425 goals.
