= David Regis =

American soccer player and coach (born 1968)

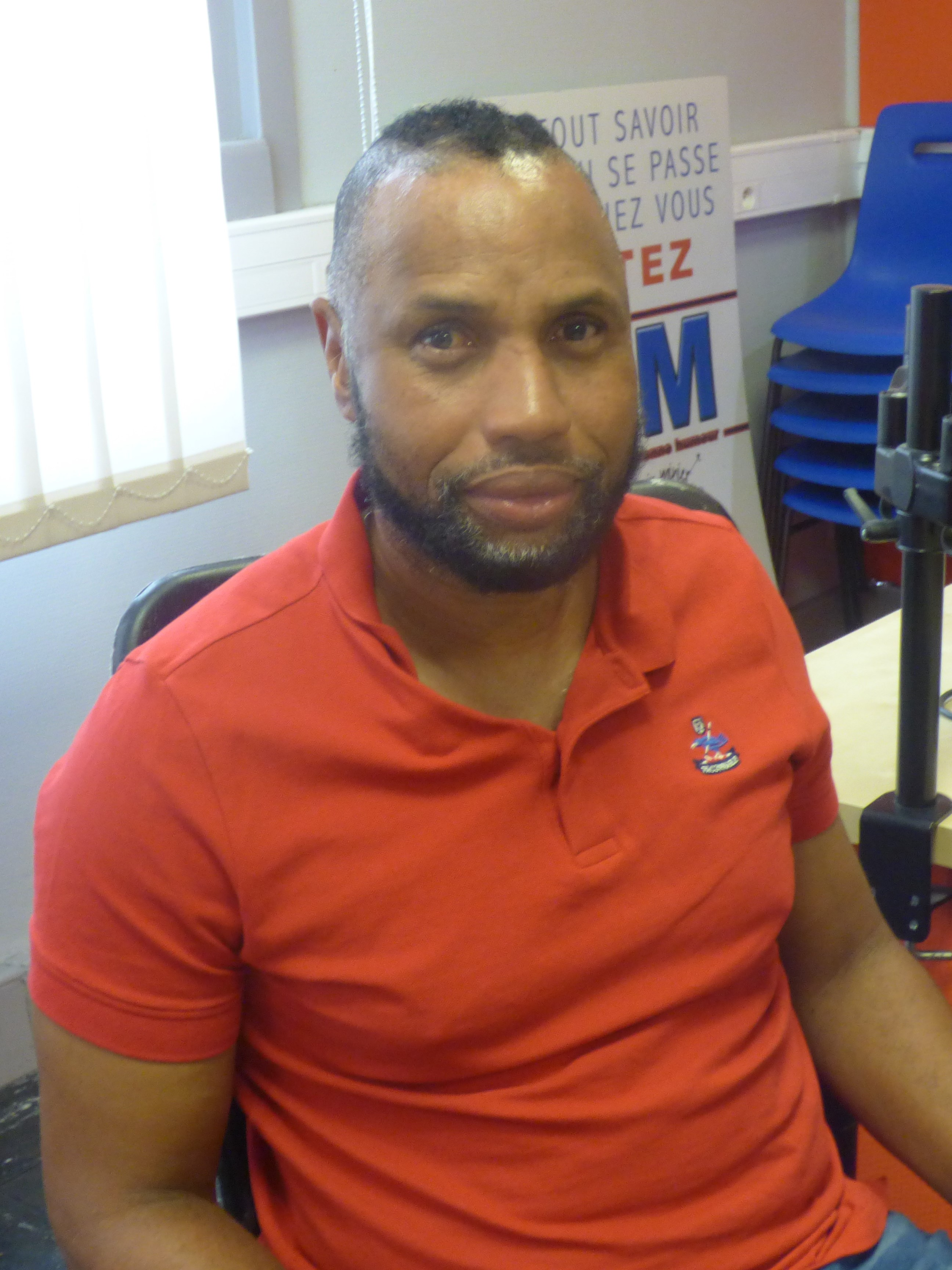
- Régis in 2020

Personal information
- Date of birth: December 2, 1968 (age 57)
- Place of birth: La Trinité, Martinique
- Height: 5 ft 9 in (1.76 m)
- Position: Defender

Senior career*
Years	Team	Apps	(Gls)
1988–1993	Valenciennes	100	(2)
1993–1996	Strasbourg	93	(2)
1996–1997	Lens	28	(1)
1997–1998	Karlsruher SC	30	(5)
1998–2002	Metz	72	(0)
2002–2005	Troyes	19	(0)
2005–2008	FC Bleid	67	(5)
Total		409	(15)

International career
1998–2002	United States	27	(0)

Managerial career
- 2008–2009: Royale Espérance Rossignol
- 2009–2010: Royal Racing Athlétic Florenvillois
- 2013: FC Mondercange (caretaker)
- 2017: Martinique (sporting director)
- 2019–2021: US Mondorf-les-Bains (assistant)
- * Club domestic league appearances and goals

David Regis (French: Régis, born December 2, 1968) is a former professional soccer player and coach who played as a defender. He was most recently the assistant coach of US Mondorf-les-Bains. Born in Martinique, he played for the United States at the 1998 and 2002 World Cups.

== Club career ==
Regis was born in La Trinité, Martinique, and began his pro career in 1988 with Valenciennes FC and played there until 1993. He was transferred to RC Strasbourg in 1993 where he won the 1995 UEFA Intertoto Cup. He then moved to RC Lens in 1996, and Karlsruhe in 1997. He transferred to FC Metz, leaving after the 2002 FIFA World Cup, spent four years there, and spent a season at Troyes AC. From the 2004–05 season, Regis played at the lower levels of the Belgian Leagues with FC Bleid respectively and retired in the summer of 2008.

== International career ==
Since Regis's wife was an American citizen, an option to play for the United States appeared. Steve Sampson, the U.S. national coach, jumped at the chance of having an experienced left back on the World Cup squad (though Regis's preferred position was always center back – where he was most successful in his club career), and promised Regis a starting position on the team if he became a U.S. citizen. Regis was naturalized on May 20, 1998, and received his first cap against Kuwait just three days later. Regis received the starting spot from Sampson, in front of long-time starter Jeff Agoos. Regis played all three matches in the World Cup, and despite being one of the more effective players for the US, the Americans lost all three of their group matches.

Regis made the U.S. roster for the 2002 FIFA World Cup as well, but did not play at the tournament. He retired with 27 caps.

== Coaching career ==
After his retirement from playing, he worked as head coach in Djibouti with Royal Racing Athlétic Florenvillois and Royale Espérance Rossignol.

In January 2017, he took over as sporting director of the Martinique national team.
