= Paul Chillan =

French footballer (1935–2021)

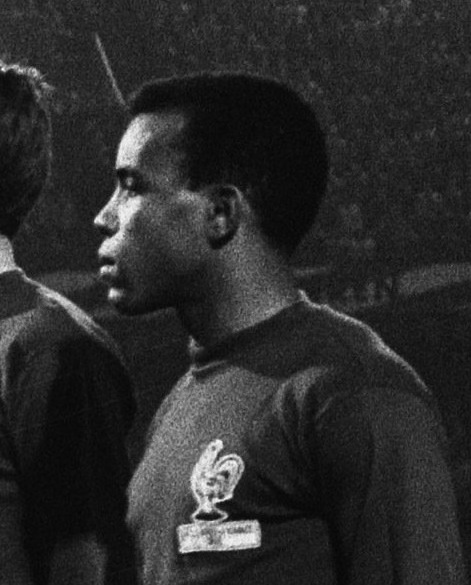
- Chillan in 1963

Personal information
- Date of birth: 17 December 1935
- Place of birth: La Trinité, Martinique
- Date of death: 1 September 2021 (aged 85)
- Height: 1.68 m (5 ft 6 in)
- Position: Forward

Senior career*
Years	Team	Apps	(Gls)
1953–1959	US Robert		
1959–1967	Nîmes		
1967–1970	Arles		

International career
1963	France	2	(0)
- * Club domestic league appearances and goals

Paul Chillan (17 December 1935 – 1 September 2021) was a French footballer who played as a forward in over 200 matches for French Ligue 1 club Nîmes between 1959 and 1967. He was born in La Trinité, Martinique, and made two appearances for the France national team in 1963.
