= Auguste Rejon =

Auguste Rejon (born 23 July 1893 in La Trinité, Martinique and died 7 March 1973 in La Trinité) was a politician from Martinique who was elected to the French Senate in 1958.
