= Jeffrey Dalmat =

French basketball player (born 1991)

Jeffrey Dalmat (born 23 April 1991 in La Trinite, Martinique) is a French basketball player who plays for French Pro A league club Poitiers.
