= Yva Léro =

Afro-Martiniquais writer and painter

- Born: Yva de Montaigne; 4 July 1912; La Trinité, Martinique
- Died: 25 September 2007 (aged 95); Fort-de-France, Martinique
- Occupations: writer, feminist

Yva Léro (4 July 1912 – 25 September 2007) was an Afro-Martiniquais writer and painter. She was one of the earliest Antillean writers in Paris preceding the Négritude movement. An ardent feminist, she participated in international congresses and was a co-founder of the Women's Union of Martinique (French: Union des Femmes de la Martinique). Her writing and painting depicted the life and culture of Martinique, evaluating class, gender, and race and the multi-layered society which existed in her Caribbean homeland.

== Early life ==
Yva de Montaigne was born on 4 July 1912 in La Trinité, Martinique to Eponine (née Vachier) and Paul de Montaigne. Both of her parents were of mixed heritage, belonged to the island's mulatto class and enjoyed the privileges that her father's employment as a road engineer for the Department of Civil Engineering brought them. He was also the head of the local Freemason Lodge and well-respected in the community. De Montaigne and her nine siblings enjoyed their childhood, but were aware of the poverty of the black workers on the island, which would later feature in her paintings.

== Paris ==
De Montaigne contracted a severe case of malaria and parasitic disease shortly after graduating from elementary school. As she was unable to attend high school, her parents enrolled her in the correspondence courses offered by the École universelle in Paris. The death of her parents, forced de Montaigne to move to Paris to join her siblings. She enrolled in the Pigier School, but left before graduating to seek employment and continue self-studies. She was among the earliest group of black Antillean writers in Paris, producing poetic works before the authors of the Négritude movement. De Montaigne became involved in the international feminist movement and was passionate about the defense of women's rights.

In 1943, French authorities in Martinique began to make administrative changes, which resulted in a burgeoning women's movement. Jane Léro, who would become de Montaigne's sister-in-law, played an active part in organizing the movement, and in June 1944 founded the Martiniquais Committee of the Union of Women (French: Comité de l’Union des Femmes de la Martinique), which in 1946 would become the Union of French Women. Yva was one of the founding members of the organization. During World War II, she worked as a messenger for the French Resistance.

Near the end of the war, de Montaigne met and married Thélus Léro, a mathematician working in Paris who was also from Martinique, and the couple subsequently had three children. Thélus would serve as a Communist senator, representing Martinique in the French Senate from 1946 to 1948, participating with Aimé Césaire and others in the process to reform the former French colonies into Departments of France. Césaire and his wife, Suzanne and the Léros became close friends, often socializing together. During this time, in 1947, Léro attended the congress of the Union of French Women as the delegate for Martinique. Later, when they returned to Martinique, Suzanne and Yva would remain close, working together on women's rights.

== Return to Martinique ==
After the war ended, the family returned to Martinique and Léro began publishing collections of short stories. Her stories reflected the multi-cultural layers of society in the Antilles and focused on class, gender and race and the interweaving of prejudices. She also published an anthology of her poetry and a novel. Illustrating her own works with etchings, she also painted scenes of rural life in Martinique, focusing on every day workers.

== Death and legacy ==
Léro died in September 2007 in Fort-de-France, Martinique and was buried on 25 September after services held at the Bellevue Church. Léro was predeceased by her daughter Cathy Rosier, who died in 2004.

== Selected works ==
- La Plaie, (written in 1957 and published in 1979). The novel evaluates prejudice and the differences between rural and urban life.
- Douchérie (1958)
- Douchérie: Loin du pays (1959)
- Peau d’ébène (1960)
- Histoires passées (1974)
