= French ship Trajan (1811) =

Ship of the line of the French Navy

- Scale model of Achille, sister ship of French ship Trajan (1811), on display at the Musée national de la Marine in Paris.

History

France
- Name: Trajan
- Namesake: Trajan
- Builder: Antwerp
- Laid down: September 1807
- Launched: 15 August 1811
- Decommissioned: 1827
- Fate: Broken up 1829

General characteristics
- Class & type: Téméraire-class ship of the line
- Displacement: 3,069 tonneaux
- Tons burthen: 1,537 port tonneaux
- Length: 55.87 m (183 ft 4 in)
- Beam: 14.46 m (47 ft 5 in)
- Draught: 7.15 m (23.5 ft)
- Depth of hold: 7.15 m (23 ft 5 in)
- Sail plan: Full-rigged ship
- Crew: 705
- Armament: 74 guns: Lower gun deck: 28 × 36 pdr guns; Upper gun deck: 30 × 18 pdr guns; Forecastle and Quarterdeck: 16–28 × 8 pdr guns and 36 pdr carronades

Trajan was a 74-gun Téméraire-class ship of the line built for the French Navy during the first decade of the 19th century. Completed in 1812, she played a minor role in the Napoleonic Wars.

== Description ==
Designed by Jacques-Noël Sané, the Téméraire-class ships had a length of 55.87 metres (183 ft 4 in), a beam of 14.46 metres (47 ft 5 in) and a depth of hold of 7.15 metres (23 ft 5 in). The ships displaced 3,069 tonneaux and had a mean draught of 7.15 metres (23 ft 5 in). They had a tonnage of 1,537 port tonneaux. Their crew numbered 705 officers and ratings during wartime. They were fitted with three masts and ship rigged.

The muzzle-loading, smoothbore armament of the Téméraire class consisted of twenty-eight 36-pounder long guns on the lower gun deck and thirty 18-pounder long guns on the upper gun deck. After about 1807, the armament on the quarterdeck and forecastle varied widely between ships with differing numbers of 8-pounder long guns and 36-pounder carronades. The total number of guns varied between sixteen and twenty-eight. The 36-pounder obusiers formerly mounted on the poop deck (dunette) in older ships were removed as obsolete.

== Construction and career ==
Trajan was ordered on 31 August 1807 and laid down in September at Antwerp. The ship was named on 17 October and launched on 15 August 1811. She was commissioned on 21 November and completed in April 1812. Trajan served in Missiessy's squadron before being stationed at Antwerp in March 1814, along with Gaulois, for the defence of the town. At the Bourbon Restoration in 1814, she returned to Brest, where she was decommissioned. In 1822 she was found to be in need of a refit, and was struck in 1827. Trajan was broken up in 1829.
