= Marius Hurard =

Martiniquais politician (1848–1902)

Deputy of the National Assembly
- In office 1881–1893
- Constituency: Martinique

Personal details
- Born: 14 October 1848 Saint-Pierre, Martinique
- Died: 8 May 1902 (aged 53) Saint-Pierre, Martinique
- Cause of death: Volcanic eruption
- Party: Republican Union
- Occupation: Lawyer, journalist, politician, factory owner

Marius Hurard (14 October 1848 – 8 May 1902) was a lawyer, journalist and politician from Martinique. He was the owner of major rum factories and served as deputy of Martinique from 1881 to 1893.

== Biography ==
Marius Hurard was a member of the Republican Union, deputy of the first constituency from 1881 to 1893 and president of the General Council in 1880. From the abolition of slavery in 1848, the Republican Party held sway in the politics of Martinique. Martinique's small mixed race middle class led the party, allied to some white republicans. The aim of the Republican Union party was to change the status of Martinique from a colony to a French department. Indeed, the Martiniquais were to enjoy the same rights and duties as the French and be subject to the same laws. The dominant political ideology in Martinique then was assimilation into France. In January 1878, Marius Hurard founded Les Colonies, a republican newspaper.

=== Campaign for secular schools in Martinique ===
Marius Hurard and most republicans of the time were driven by an ideal of a secular society. Their opponents were the conservative descendants of the former white settlers; their perspective was represented in La Défense coloniale, a newspaper committed to the defence of the colonial system. Secular schools were one of the main areas of contention between republicans and conservatives. For the republicans, education was a lever for social promotion and human emancipation, and therefore should be accessible to all, independent of any religion. Hurard wrote a public letter touching on this to the liberal economist Pierre Paul Leroy-Beaulieu, in response to a proposal in the essay, De la colonisation chez les peuples modernes, of removing universal suffrage from Martinique to replace it with an electoral census, to be directed by the white minority. Hurard's letter points out that this is proposing tyranny, but also the proposal's implied future avoidance of education for a capable population, to justify reinstatement of perpetual control over Martinique's majority.

Until then, public primary schools in Martinique were mainly run by religious orders, the Brothers of Christian Instruction and the Sisters of St. Joseph of Cluny. The Brothers of Christian Instruction were running at least 36 primary schools on Martinique by 1875, after having arrived in 1839, when only eight communes out of 36 had a school attended by ten to fifteen pupils, in an island of nearly 110,000 inhabitants. Their main aim was the religious education of children. The schools of the Sisters of St. Joseph of Cluny admitted only white girls under the pretext that black girls could easily become servants. Marius Hurard and the Republicans, who had a majority in the General Council, voted to open secular schools, with the aim of preparing children in mathematics, reading and writing French, open to all children and positioned in most of the island's communes. This vote passed ahead of the application of the Jules Ferry laws on secular, public and compulsory schooling. The enactment of Ferry's laws is celebrated on 9 December in France; on Martinique, it is also time to remember the work of Marius Hurard.

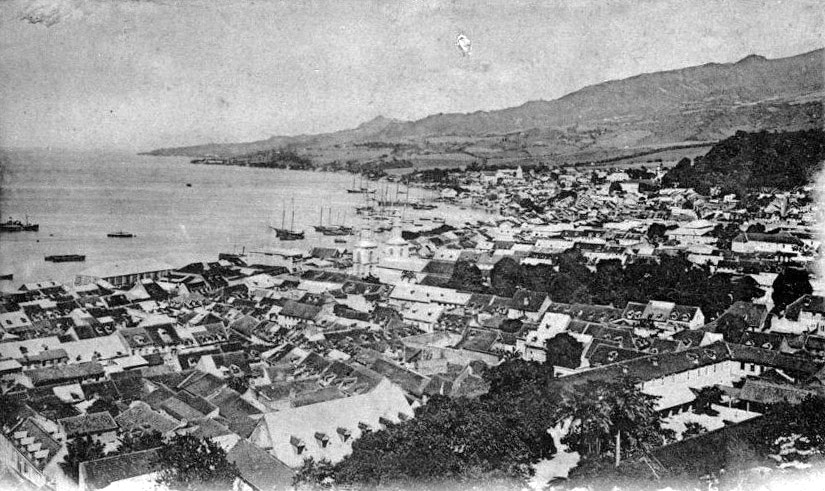
Saint-Pierre harbour in Martinique, before 1902; the lycée is in the lower right hand corner

Thus, on 21 July 1881, the Lycée Saint-Pierre was inaugurated. Marius Hurard charged it with this task: «d’abattre la Bastille qui s'appelle l'ignorance et, avec elle, cette sottise inanalysable que l’on appelle le préjugé de couleur» ("tearing down the Bastille called ignorance and, with it, that inanalyzable foolishness called colour prejudice"). In 1884, a colonial boarding school for young girls was opened in Saint-Pierre. Faced with delays due its high cost, Marius Hurard travelled to the metropolis at his own expense to recruit teachers for the new high school in Saint-Pierre. In the following year, teacher training schools were opened in Saint-Pierre and Fort-de-France. Despite the resistance of the conservatives and part of the population, the secular school was adopted throughout Martinique. It was possible thanks to the persistence of Marius Hurard and some elected members of the general council, such as Ernest Deproge, Clavius Marius, Eugène Agricole and Auguste Waddy.

=== Marius Hurard and autonomy ===
In 1885, in the middle of the legislative campaign, a split occurred within the Republican party, between Ernest Deproge and Hurard. It was an important question: should the policy of complete assimilation of Martinique into France be pursued or not? Ernest Deproge and his supporters were in favour. Marius Hurard's group was against it.

Hurard's position interested the Béké group, which saw this as an opportunity to start again in politics after 1848. Marius Hurard, his supporters and a group of republican Békés created a new party, the Parti Républicain Progressiste or Parti nouveau. The main political ideology at the end of the 19th century was assimilation into France. The new party argued for autonomy to defend the economic interest of the Béké group in Martinique. Marius Hurard and his supporters saw assimilation as bringing metropolitan social laws which would result in extra costs for factories and plantations. Assimilation would also reduce the powers of the General Council, which they controlled and centralise power and ministerial supervision in Paris. Marius Hurard's idea of autonomy was different from that popularised by Aimé Césaire. Hurard's autonomy was to preserve the economic and political interests of the Béké group and the mixed race bourgeoisie of the island. It was not a popular movement, and Martinican identity did not often occur in Hurard's speeches and writings. In comparison, Aimé Césaire was able to say: "I believe that we Martinicans have a personality, a personality that is not absolutely a French personality, nor is it an African personality, a personality that is our own, a Martinican personality, and I believe that we must preserve this personality, we must cultivate it, we must develop it..."

=== Political decline ===
Marius Hurard was also a merchant, in addition to being a lawyer. His modest background made him very popular in his town. In 1895, though Marius Hurard was sentenced to prison for commercial bankruptcy, this did not dent his popularity.

In 1896, the Hurardists obtained only 10 seats out of 36 in the General Council. In the municipal elections, they lost Martinique's two main towns, Saint-Pierre and Fort-de-France. Retired from political life, Marius Hurard died on 8 May 1902 at the age of 53 during the eruption of Mount Pelée in Saint-Pierre. Les Colonies records his resolution to stay there, despite the move to leave Saint Pierre caused by earthquakes; he cited the earthquake of 21 January 1839, which killed 400 people and damaged the capital and said: "We confess that we do not understand this panic. Where better to be than in Saint-Pierre? Do those who invade Fort-de-France imagine that they would be better off there than here if the earth were to shake? This is a big mistake and the population must be warned against it."

=== Memorial ===
In 2008 the Pointe des Nègres primary school in Fort-de-France was named after Marius Hurard as a tribute to his achievements in education.

== Sources ==
- Marius Hurard, Les Noirs et les Blancs à la Martinique : questions coloniales, Paris : Imprimerie Raoul Bonnet et Compagnie, 1882
- Armand Nicolas, Histoire de la Martinique. Vol 2, 1848 to 1939
- Albanie Burand, La vie politique à Saint-Pierre de la Martinique de 1848 à 1902
