= Ernest Deproge =

Martiniquais deputy (1850–1921)

Deputy of the National Assembly
- In office 1882–1885
- Constituency: Martinique

Deputy of the National Assembly
- In office 1885–1889

Deputy of the National Assembly
- In office 1889–1893

Deputy of the National Assembly
- In office 1893–1898

Personal details
- Born: Louis-Joseph Ernest Deproge; August 15, 1850 Fort-de-France, Martinique
- Died: December 19, 1921 (aged 71)
- Party: Republican Union (France) (1885-89); Gauche radicale (1889-98)

Louis-Joseph Ernest Deproge, (15 August 1850 - December 1921) was a lawyer and deputy of Martinique from 1882 to 1898.

== Biography ==
=== Education ===
Ernest Deproge completed his primary education in Fort-de-France. He left for France, obtaining his baccalaureate in Rouen; he then began studying law in Paris. The Franco-Prussian War forced him to abandon his studies for a while to take part in the fighting. When the war ended, he resumed his university studies and obtained his law degree. Ernest Deproge returned to Martinique to practise law.

=== Political career ===
In 1878, Deprogue and César Lainé assisted Marius Hurard in the publication of Les Colonies. It was the first newspaper founded and run by republican free men of color in Martinique. In 1880, he held the post of president of the General Council of Martinique for a year. In 1885, a rivalry between Deproge and Hurard caused the break-up of the Republican party. Ernest Deproge's assimilationist camp accused Marius Hurard of collusion with the autonomist Béké group. They each created their own political party. Deproge founded the Parti Radical Socialiste Martiniquais, or Union Républicaine. Hurard created the Parti Républicain Progressiste. At the age of 48, Ernest Deproge left political life and Martinique. He became director of the Banque de la Réunion and then of various institutions in France. After a long illness, he died on the 19th December in Sanvic (Seine-Maritime), at the age of 71.

=== Memorials and legacy ===
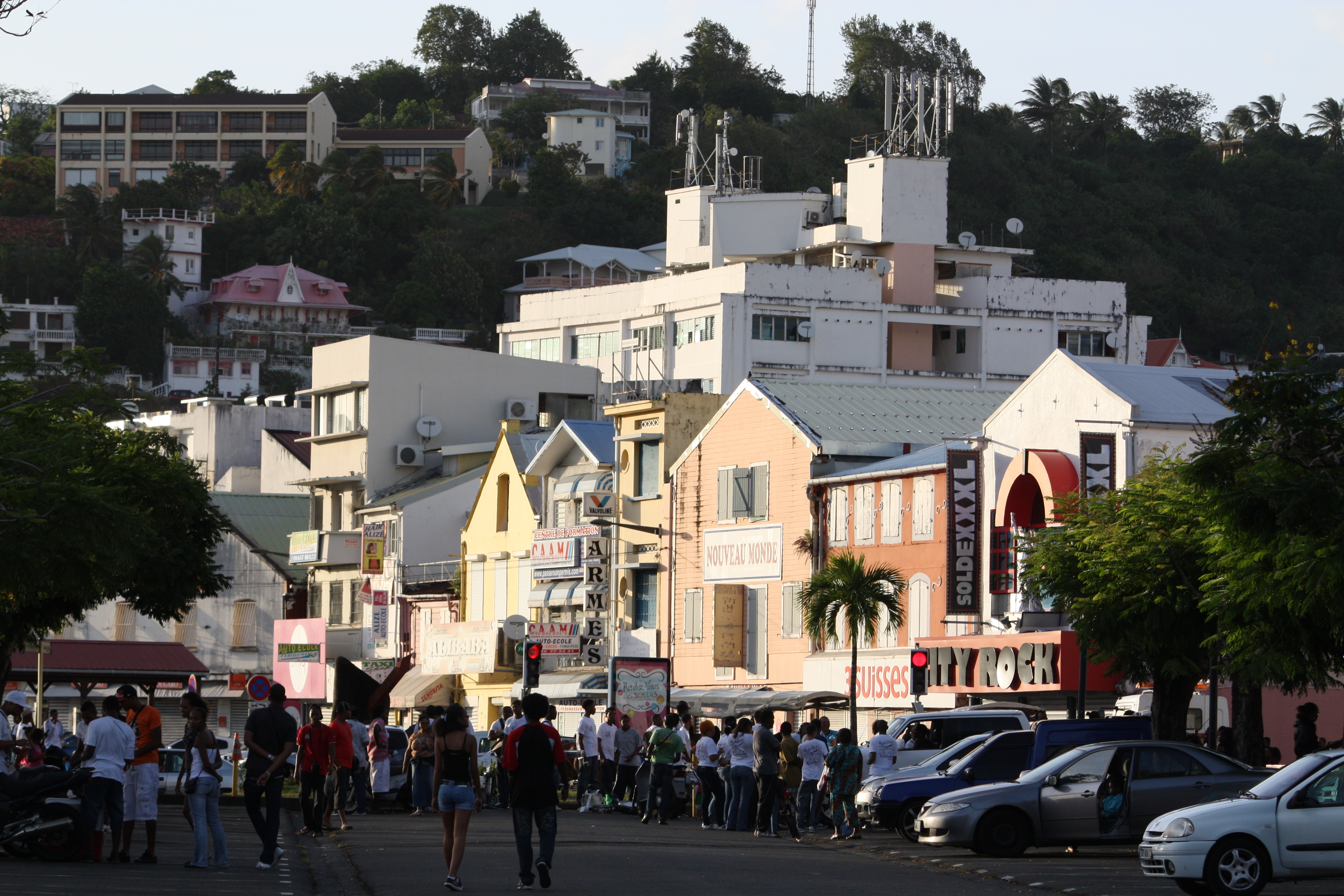
Rue Ernest Deproge in Fort-de-France, Martinique

A street by the sea, near his family home in Fort-de-France, was named after him. In 1925, bust was unveiled at Place Fabien, a plaza between rue Isambert and rue Victor Sévère in Fort-de-France, Martinique. He is now considered a controversial figure of French colonialism in Martinique's history; in 2021, protesters pushed his bust off its plinth. The Martinique Heritage Database, a project of the General Council of Martinique, writes the following about how he is remembered:

Deproge is an illustration of the paradox of the West Indian elites of the Third Republic: at once a promoter of French colonial action and a fervent defender of values of emancipation and equality which, in the long run, undermined colonisation but for the meantime served to justify French expansionism. We can therefore understand his break with Marius Hurard, which can be interpreted in two ways: loyalty to the assimilationist line, while Hurard allied himself with the békés to demand more autonomy from the metropolis; or extreme integrity and attachment to the values of the radical Republic, in the face of Hurard's opportunism.

— 2ème rendez-vous avec l'histoire du Conseil général, Portail de la Banque Numérique des Patrimoines Martiniquais (patrimoines-martinique.org)

== Political career ==
- Deputy of Martinique from 1882 to 1896
- President of the General Council 1880 to 1881

== Bibliography ==
- Fort de France : les hommes d'hier dans nos rue d'aujourd'hui. Éditions Femmes actuelles.
- Albanie Burand. La Vie politique à Saint-Pierre de la Martinique de 1848 à 1902. Éditions Ibis rouge.
