= La Gauloise de Trinité =

Multi-sport club in La Trinité, Martinique

- Short name: Gauloise
- Founded: 1920
- Based in: La Trinité, Martinique

La Gauloise de Trinité is a multi-sport club located in La Trinité, Martinique. It was founded in 1920.

== Sections ==
=== Basketball ===
La Gauloise de Trinité has a basketball team. In 2019, it changed its logo for the upcoming occasion of its 100th birthday.

=== Football ===
The association football section of La Gauloise has been fairly successful since its creation; it has won the Martinique Championnat National, the highest division of football in Martinique, on five occasions.

=== Handball ===
La Gauloise de Trinité's handball section has seen several famous handballers go through its ranks, notably including Cédric Sorhaindo, Gilles Mazarin, Hyppolite Rapon, and Janou Sejean.

=== Rugby ===
The club has a rugby union team that was founded in 1968, making it the oldest rugby team in Martinique. The rugby section has three parts: the rugby school, the seniors section (men and women), and touch rugby.

=== Other sports ===
- Badminton
- Gymnastics
