= Thélus Léro =

Martiniquais politician

Thélus Léro (22 February 1909 in Lamentin, Martinique – 22 July 1996 in Fort-de-France) was a communist politician from Martinique who was elected to the French Senate in 1946. Léro married the writer and artist, Yva de Montaigne, with whom he had three children. One of their daughters was the actress Cathy Rosier.
