= Homère Clément =

French physician and politician (1852–1923)

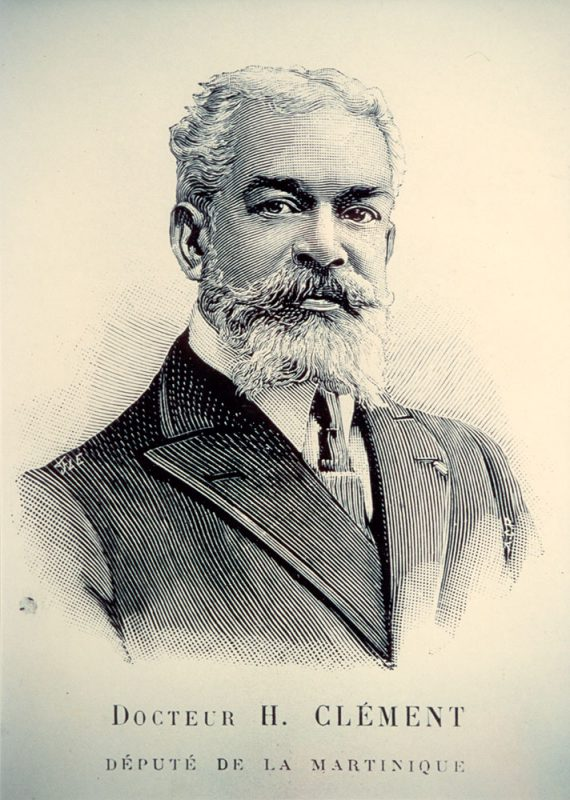
- Born: 12 July 1852; La Trinité
- Died: 8 November 1923 (aged 71); Paris
- Awards: Chevalier of the Legion of Honour (1897)

Homère Clément (12 July 1852 – 8 November 1923) was a medical doctor and radical-socialist politician, born in La Trinité, Martinique. He who served in the French National Assembly as deputy of Martinique from 1902-1906. He died in Paris, aged 71.
