= Jane Léro =

Feminist and communist from Martinique (1916–1961)

- Born: February 8, 1916; Le Lamentin, Martinique
- Died: July 17, 1961 (aged 45)
- Occupations: Feminist and activist
- Relatives: Étienne Léro (brother); Yva Léro (sister-in-law)

Jane Marie Apolinaire Léro (also Jeanne Léro; born February 8, 1916, Le Lamentin, Martinique – July 17, 1961, Martinique) was a feminist and communist activist from Martinique.

== Biography ==
She was born the fifth child in a family that would eventually grow to eight children. Her parents had a small mercantile business. She studied at the colonial boarding school (Pensionnat Colonial) for girls in Fort-de-France, before continuing to the lycée Schoelcher; at the time, it was unusual for a female student to choose this secondary school because it specialized in mathematics and science. Léro earned the highest honors for her work in mathematics and received her baccalauréat in mathematics in 1937 or 1938.

Because of her gender, she was unable to travel to France as a youth to receive higher education, as two of her brothers had done. Her brothers Thélus and Etienne contributed to the radical Martiniquais student journal Légitime Défense while they were both students in Paris in the 1930s.

Léro opened a small store that became a meeting spot for politically active Martinicans. She began to read the literary magazine Tropiques, in which authors such as Aimé Césaire advanced new theorizations of colonization, politics, and race.

== Activism ==
Léro joined the Communist Party in 1943. In 1944, the first election year in which Martiniquais women were able to vote, she organized electoral campaigns and participated in conferences. She also wrote articles for the party's magazine Justice.

In June 1944, Léro led the foundation of the Union des Femmes de la Martinique (l'UFM; Union of Women of Martinique) at the behest of the Communist Party. Her sister-in-law Yva Léro was also a founding member. The feminist organization brought together communists and democrats and fought for causes such as social security, healthcare, education, and nutrition. It was radical in its critique of socioeconomic inequality and provided many social services for women ignored or underserved by the French government. Health care was a main focus. Voting was also central to its mission. She served as its president until 1947 or 1949, when she departed for France to pursue higher education in social work. Léro earned a degree in social work in Paris in 1951 and worked in France for several years.

Léro returned to Martinique in 1956 to organize social services in the department of Fort-de-France as a government employee. The political landscape had changed, and she was torn between allegiance to the communist party and her friendship with the Césaires.

She died in 1961; her cause of death remains unclear.

== Honors ==
Léro's life and work have been re-centered in Martiniquais history beginning in the early 2000s. She has become the subject of the work of scholars such as Clara Palmiste, Cécile Celma, and Annette Joseph-Gabriel.

The domestic violence response center of the Union of Women of Martinique in Fort-de-France was renamed the "Jane Léro Building" in 2002.
