= French ship Gaulois (1812) =

Ship of the line of the French Navy

- Scale model of Achille, sister ship of French ship Gaulois (1812), on display at the Musée national de la Marine in Paris.

History

France
- Name: Gaulois
- Namesake: Gaul
- Builder: Antwerp
- Laid down: 1807
- Launched: 14 April 1812
- Decommissioned: 1824
- Fate: Broken up, 1831

General characteristics
- Class & type: Téméraire-class ship of the line
- Displacement: 3,069 tonneaux
- Tons burthen: 1,537 port tonneaux
- Length: 55.87 m (183 ft 4 in)
- Beam: 14.46 m (47 ft 5 in)
- Draught: 7.15 m (23.5 ft)
- Depth of hold: 7.15 m (23 ft 5 in)
- Sail plan: Full-rigged ship
- Crew: 705
- Armament: 74 guns: Lower gun deck: 28 × 36 pdr guns; Upper gun deck: 30 × 18 pdr guns; Forecastle and Quarterdeck: 16–28 × 8 pdr guns and 36 pdr carronades

Gaulois was a 74-gun Téméraire-class ship of the line built for the French Navy during the first decade of the 19th century. Completed in 1812, she played a minor role in the Napoleonic Wars.

== Description ==
Designed by Jacques-Noël Sané, the Téméraire-class ships had a length of 55.87 metres (183 ft 4 in), a beam of 14.46 metres (47 ft 5 in) and a depth of hold of 7.15 metres (23 ft 5 in). The ships displaced 3,069 tonneaux and had a mean draught of 7.15 metres (23 ft 5 in). They had a tonnage of 1,537 port tonneaux. Their crew numbered 705 officers and ratings during wartime. They were fitted with three masts and ship rigged.

The muzzle-loading, smoothbore armament of the Téméraire class consisted of twenty-eight 36-pounder long guns on the lower gun deck and thirty 18-pounder long guns on the upper gun deck. After about 1807, the armament on the quarterdeck and forecastle varied widely between ships with differing numbers of 8-pounder long guns and 36-pounder carronades. The total number of guns varied between sixteen and twenty-eight. The 36-pounder obusiers formerly mounted on the poop deck (dunette) in older ships were removed as obsolete.

== Construction and career ==
Gaulois was ordered on 31 August 1807 and laid down in September in Antwerp. The ship was named on 17 October 1807, launched on 14 April 1812 and completed in August. Gaulois served in Missiessy's squadron under Captain Malin before being stationed at Antwerp in March, along with her sister ship Trajan. At the Bourbon Restoration in 1814, she returned to Brest, where she was decommissioned. She was struck in 1827 and broken up in 1831.
