= Le Tour de Yoles Rondes de Martinique =

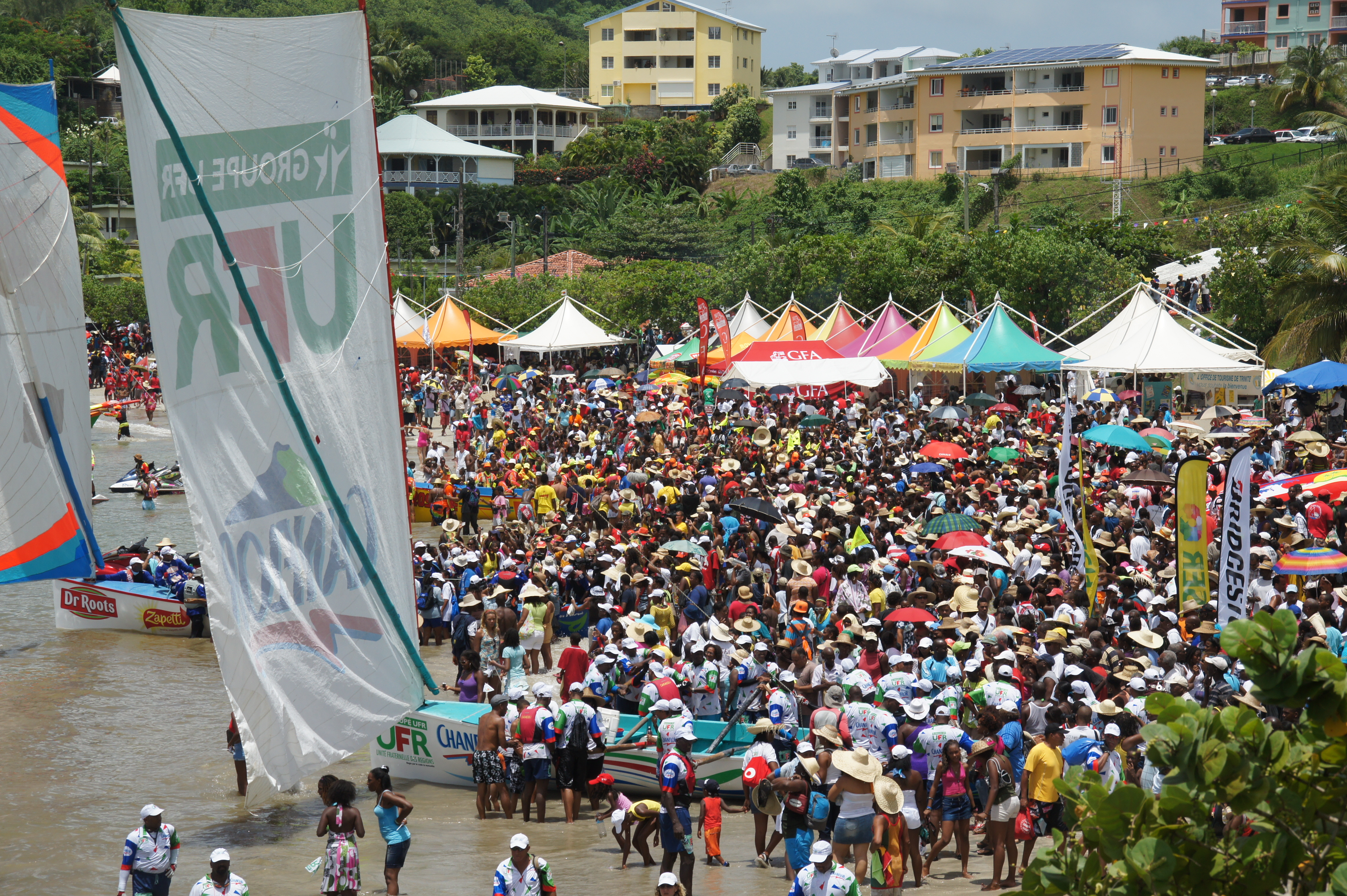
Finish of a 2011 stage

Le Tour de la Martinique des Yoles Rondes is an annual sailing regatta on Martinique. The island's largest sporting event, it takes place in late July and early August and is popular with spectators.

== Course and teams ==
The event is organized by the Fédération des yoles rondes. Crews circumnavigate Martinque on an eight-stage, 180-kilometre (110 mi) course. The race begins with a prologue time trial from the starting city. The time trial determines the starting order of the top ten yoles, with the time between starts determined by each boat's lead over the next during the prologue; all yoles below the top ten start simultaneously. The next seven stages circumnavigate the island. The stage around the island's southern part, beginning at the commune of Le Diamant, passing Sainte-Anne and ending at Le François, is known as the Défi de l'Espace Sud (Southern Challenge Area).

The standard craft is the yole, a traditional Martinique open-water sailing and fishing boat. The yole is about 11 metres (36 ft) long, with a canoe-like hull of laminated wood. Its masts are made of unlaminated wood from the trunk of a single tree, and its sprits are usually laminated bamboo. The boat is fore-and-aft-rigged, with a single large sail ranging from 35 square metres (380 sq ft) to 82 square metres (880 sq ft) in area (depending on wind conditions). Each yole has a seven- to fourteen-person crew. Two hang from ropes and harnesses attached to the top of the mast and work the rigging; three stand in the rear, steering the craft with a 2-metre (6.6 ft) long paddle; two stand amidships and adjust the sail; and up to seven additional crew members sit on wooden poles jutting from the windward side. The pole-sitters move inboard and outboard as needed, allowing the sail to make maximum use of the wind and preventing the boat from capsizing. If wind conditions are right, a second square sail may be added to the front of the boat and the main mast moved slightly to the rear. Sails are brightly colored, with the name of the organization, the boat's owner and the logos and names of sponsors.

Clubs field yoles for the Tours des yoles rondes. There are about 20 clubs (with the number varying from year to year), most of which are semi-professional. Although membership is open to anyone, a place on a yole crew is highly competitive. Clubs usually seek corporate sponsorship to finance their activities. During the year they practice sailing, race intramurally, build public support and engage in charitable and other activities.

The Tour begins in a different town each year. Each stage begins on shore, where groups of pushers associated with each yole use long poles to push it into the water as quickly as possible so the sail can catch the wind. Each stage is timed, with points awarded based on each boat's time. The yole with the lowest total time and the lowest number of points is the winner.

On April 16, 2020, the Fédération des yoles rondes decided to cancel the 36th edition of the tour due to the global epidemic of coronavirus. A virtual competition was held instead.

=== Popularity ===
Local media coverage of the Tour des yoles rondes is extensive. Local France-Antilles newspapers publish daily special editions with race coverage, and the television channel Radio France Overseas (RFO) has a special broadcast each evening during the event. The Tour des yoles rondes is not only the national sporting event of Martinqiue, but is unique to Martinique and is watched by nearly all the island's population. As many as 300 motorboats and sailing craft may follow the racers on the course, cheering their favorites. Thousands of people also line the shore, watching the race as it passes by. The event is recreated in sailing simulation apps for iOS and Android devices.

== Prizes ==
Each stage of the race awards colored shirts indicating the standings of the top racers:

- Red: Given to the yole with the fastest overall time in the race
- Blue: Given at the end of each stage to the stage winner
- Pink: Given at the end of each stage to the second-place finisher
- Beige: Given at the end of each stage to the third-place finisher
- Light blue: Given at the end of each stage to the fourth-place finisher
- Purple: Given at the end of each stage to the fifth-place finisher

Other shirts include:

- Green with white dots: Given to the yole with the lowest number of points at the end of each stage
- Yellow: A most-improved award, given to the yole improving the most in two successive stages
- Orange: A prize given to one of the bottom-five yoles with the fastest time between two predetermined points in a stage
- White: Given to the yole whose performance during a stage received the most media attention.
- Green: Given to the yole with the fastest time in the Defi de l'Espace Sud stage

== Winners ==
| Year | Departure | Winner |
| Year | Departure | Yole's name | Commune | Owner |
|---|---|---|---|---|
| 1985 | Sainte-Anne | Monoprix | Le Marin | Désiré Lamon |
| 1986 | Le Marin | Caresse Antillaise Ki mafoutiésa | Le François | Joseph Mas |
| 1987 | Le Vauclin | Nissan | Le François | Charles Exilie |
| 1988 | Le Marin | Martinique Chanflor | Le Robert | Frantz Ferjules |
| 1989 | Le Robert | Nissan | Le François | Georges-Henry Lagier |
| 1990 | Le François | Budget | Le Robert | Félix Mérine |
| 1991 | Le Robert | Sisal | Le Robert | Frantz Ferjules |
| 1992 | Fort-de-France | Rosette | Le François | Charles Exilie |
| 1993 | Fort-de-France | Ho Hio Hen | Le François | Joseph Mas |
| 1994 | Le Robert | Rosette | Le François | Georges-Henry Lagier |
| 1995 | Sainte-Anne | Ho Hio Hen | Le François | Joseph Mas |
| 1996 | Schœlcher | Rosette | Le François | Georges-Henry Lagier |
| 1997 | La Trinité | Rosette | Le François | Georges-Henry Lagier |
| 1998 | Le Diamant | Ho Hio Hen | Le François | Joseph Mas |
| 1999 | Le Robert | Rosette | Le François | Georges-Henry Lagier |
| 2000 | Le François | Rosette-France Télécom | Le François | Georges-Henry Lagier |
| 2001 | Fort-de-France | Géant-Canon | Le Robert | Félix Mérine |
| 2002 | Saint-Pierre | Géant-Orange | Le Robert | Félix Mérine |
| 2003 | Fort-de-France | Géant-Orange | Le Robert | Félix Mérine |
| 2004 | Schœlcher | Rosette-France Télécom | Le François | Georges-Henry Lagier |
| 2005 | Le Diamant | Rosette-France Télécom | Le François | Georges-Henry Lagier |
| 2006 | Le Robert | U.F.R.-Géant Korail 2 | Le Robert | Félix Mérine |
| 2007 | Fort-de-France | U.F.R.-Géant Korail 2 | Le Robert | Félix Mérine |
| 2008 | La Trinité | Mirsa – Dr Roots | Le François | Joseph Mas |
| 2009 | Le Vauclin | Joseph Cottrell – Optical Chaben An | Le François | Guy-Albert Romer |
| 2010 | Fort-de-France | Joseph Cottrell – Leader Mat | Le François | Guy-Albert Romer |
| 2011 | Le Robert | U.F.R – Chanflor | Le Robert | Felix Merine |
| 2012 | Le Robert | Brasserie Lorraine – ISUZU | Le Marin | Johan Jacqua |
| 2013 | Le Marin | U.F.R – Chanflor | Le Robert | Felix Merine |
| 2014 | Fort-de France | Rosette-Orange | Le François | Jacques Amalir |
