= List of lighthouses in Martinique =

This is a list of lighthouses in Martinique.

== Lighthouses ==
Name	Image	Year built	Location & coordinates	Class of light	Focal height	NGA number	Admiralty number	Range nml
Baie du Carénage Range Front Lighthouse	Image	n/a	Fort-de-France; 14°36′14.6″N 61°03′44.2″W	Iso G 4s.	12 metres (39 ft)	14960	J5784	18
Baie du Carénage Range Rear Lighthouse	Image	n/a	Fort-de-France; 14°36′18.2″N 61°03′43.2″W	Iso G	14 metres (46 ft)	14964	J5784.1	18
Baie du François Lighthouse	Image	n/a	Le Vauclin; 14°38′09.2″N 60°53′28.7″W	Q WRG	9 metres (30 ft)	14934	J5772.5	white: 8 red: 6 green: 6
Cape Chevalier Lighthouse		n/a	Sainte-Anne; 14°26′07.8″N 60°49′37.1″W	Q WRG	9 metres (30 ft)	14937.05	J5775	white: 10 red: 7 green: 7
Îlet à Cabrit Lighthouse	Image	1929 est.	Sainte-Anne; 14°23′31.0″N 60°52′04.0″W	Fl (4) W 15s.	27 metres (89 ft)	14940	J5776	15
La Caravelle Lighthouse	Image	1862	La Trinité; 14°46′20.4″N 60°52′54.7″W	Fl (3) W 15s.	159.25 metres (522.5 ft)	14932	J5772	22
Point du Marin Lighthouse	Image	n/a	Sainte-Anne; 14°27′02.5″N 60°53′00.5″W	Q WRG	7 metres (23 ft)	14944	J5777	white: 9 red: 6 green: 6
Pointe de Negres Lighthouse	Image	1924	Schœlcher; 14°35′58.6″N 61°05′24.7″W	Fl W 5s.	28 metres (92 ft)	14948	J5780	24
Port-Vauclin Lighthouse	Image	n/a	Le Vauclin; 14°33′05.4″N 60°50′10.2″W	Q WRG	7 metres (23 ft)	14936	J5773	white: 11 red: 9 green: 9
Precheur Point Lighthouse	Image	1929	Le Prêcheur; 14°48′06.8″N 61°13′33.0″W	Fl R 5s.	12 metres (39 ft)	14996	J5790.5	15

== See also ==
- Lists of lighthouses and lightvessels
