= Rivière-Pilote =

- Commune
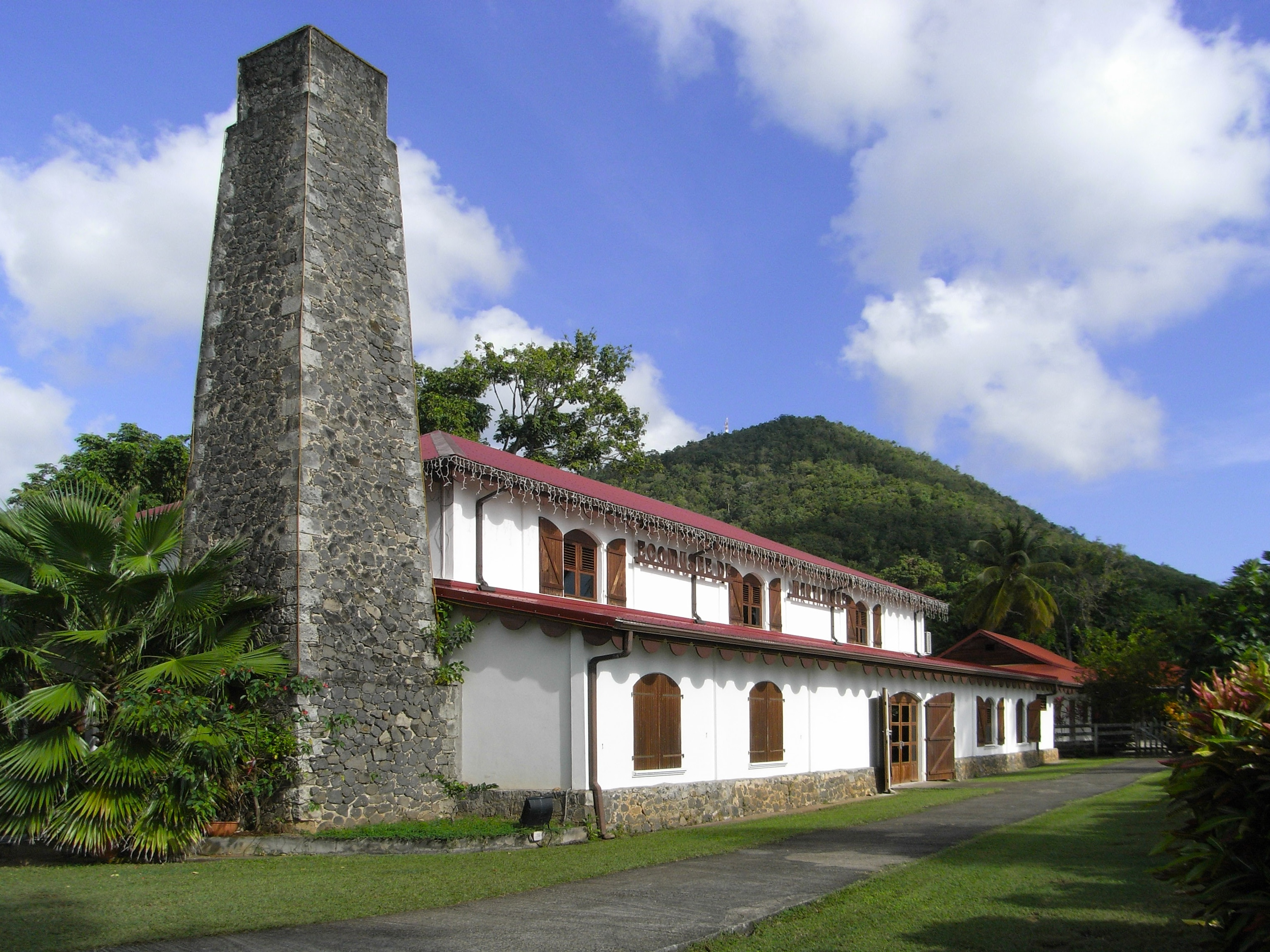
- The Ecomuseum of Martinique in Rivière-Pilote

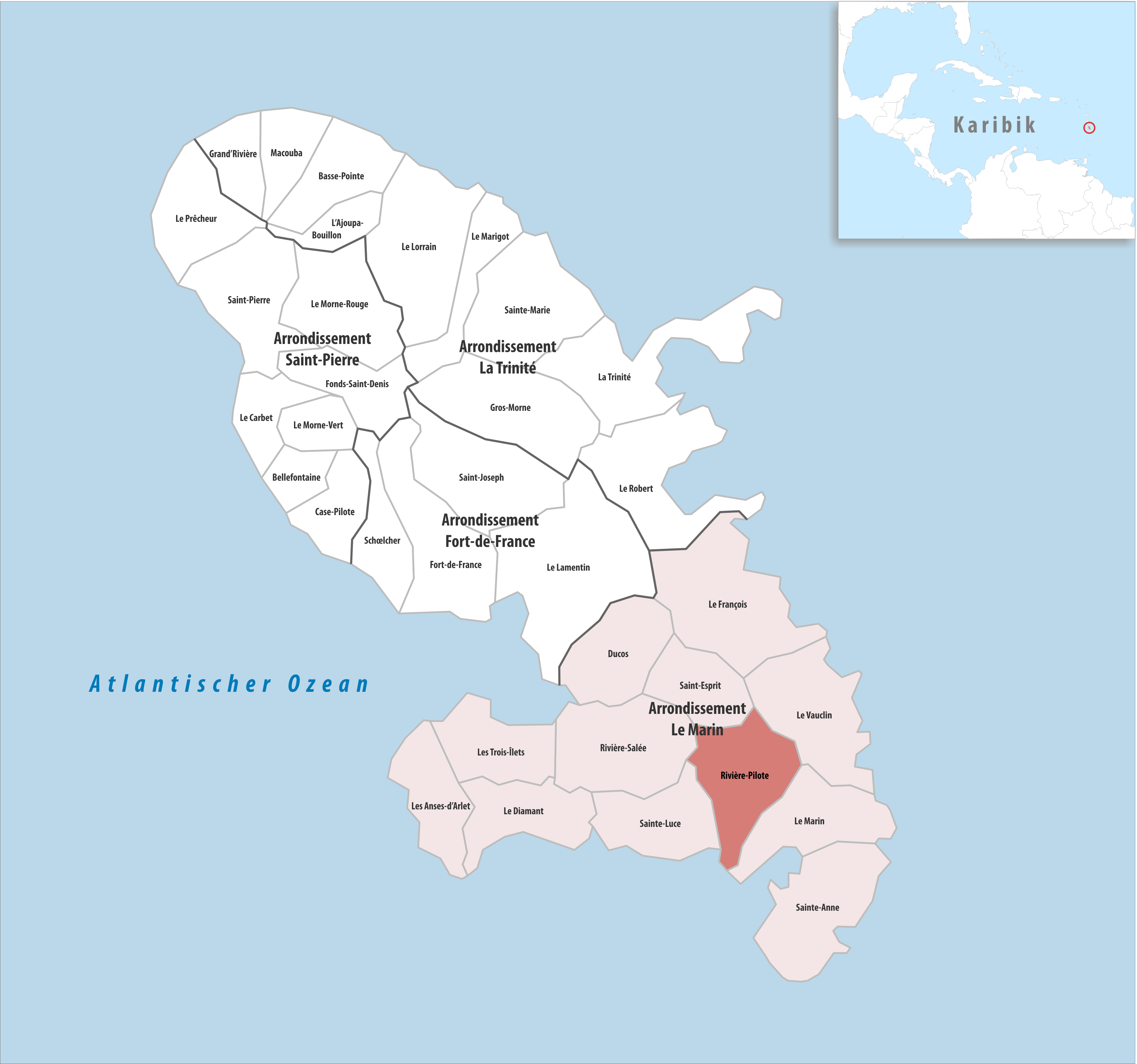
- Location of the commune (in red) within Martinique
- Location of Rivière-Pilote
- Location within France
- Coordinates: 14°29′N 60°54′W
- Country: France
- Overseas region and department: Martinique
- Arrondissement: Le Marin
- Intercommunality: CA Espace Sud de la Martinique

Government
  - Mayor (2020–2026): Jean-François Beaunol
- Area^{1}: 35.78 km^{2} (13.81 sq mi)
- Highest elevation: 372 m (1,220 ft)
- Lowest elevation: 0 m (0 ft)
- Population (2023): 11,604
  - Density: 324.3/km^{2} (840.0/sq mi)
- Time zone: UTC−04:00 (AST)
- INSEE/Postal code: 97220 /97211
- ^{1} French Land Register data, which excludes lakes, ponds, glaciers > 1 km^{2} (0.386 sq mi or 247 acres) and river estuaries.

Rivière-Pilote (French pronunciation: [ʁivjɛʁ pilɔt]; Martinican Creole: Lavièpilot or Wivièpilot) is a town and commune in the French overseas department of Martinique.

The village is situated on the southern end of Martinique, between the village of Sainte-Luce and the town of Le Marin which is a popular haven for yachts. Rivière-Pilote lies inland on the River Grande Pilote which drains the southern slopes of the mountainous Parc Naturel Regional. The village is predominantly one- or two-storey houses with a few small shops and cafes or bars.

== Population ==
Historical population
| Year | Pop. | ±% p.a. |
|---|---|---|
| 1967 | 12,027 | — |
| 1974 | 11,064 | −1.19% |
| 1982 | 11,249 | +0.21% |
| 1990 | 12,617 | +1.44% |
| 1999 | 13,057 | +0.38% |
| 2007 | 13,621 | +0.53% |
| 2012 | 12,680 | −1.42% |
| 2017 | 11,935 | −1.20% |
| 2023 | 11,604 | −0.47% |
Source: INSEE

== See also ==
- Communes of the Martinique department
