= Le Vauclin =

Commune in Martinique, France

- Commune
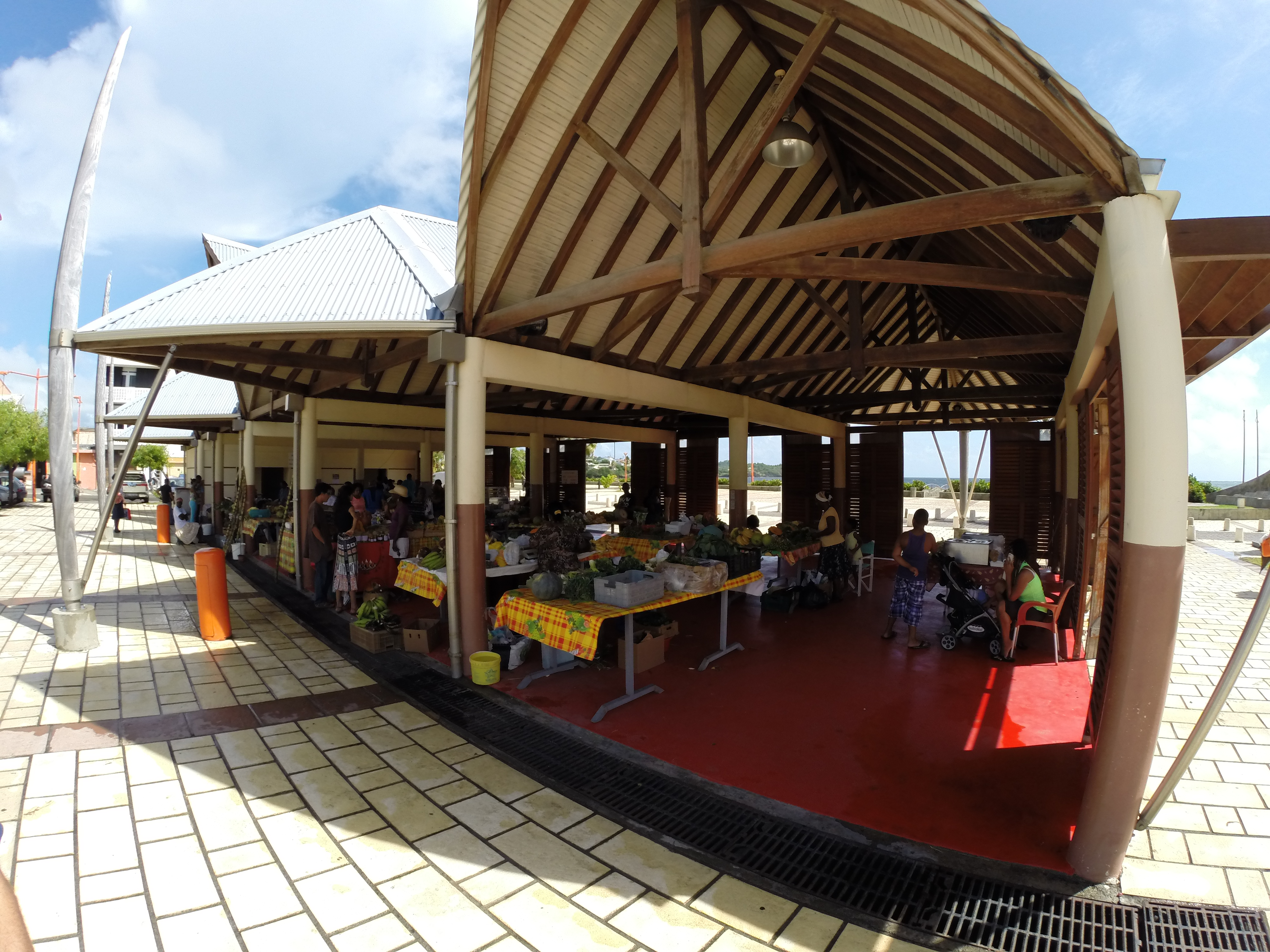
- The fruit and vegetable market in Le Vauclin

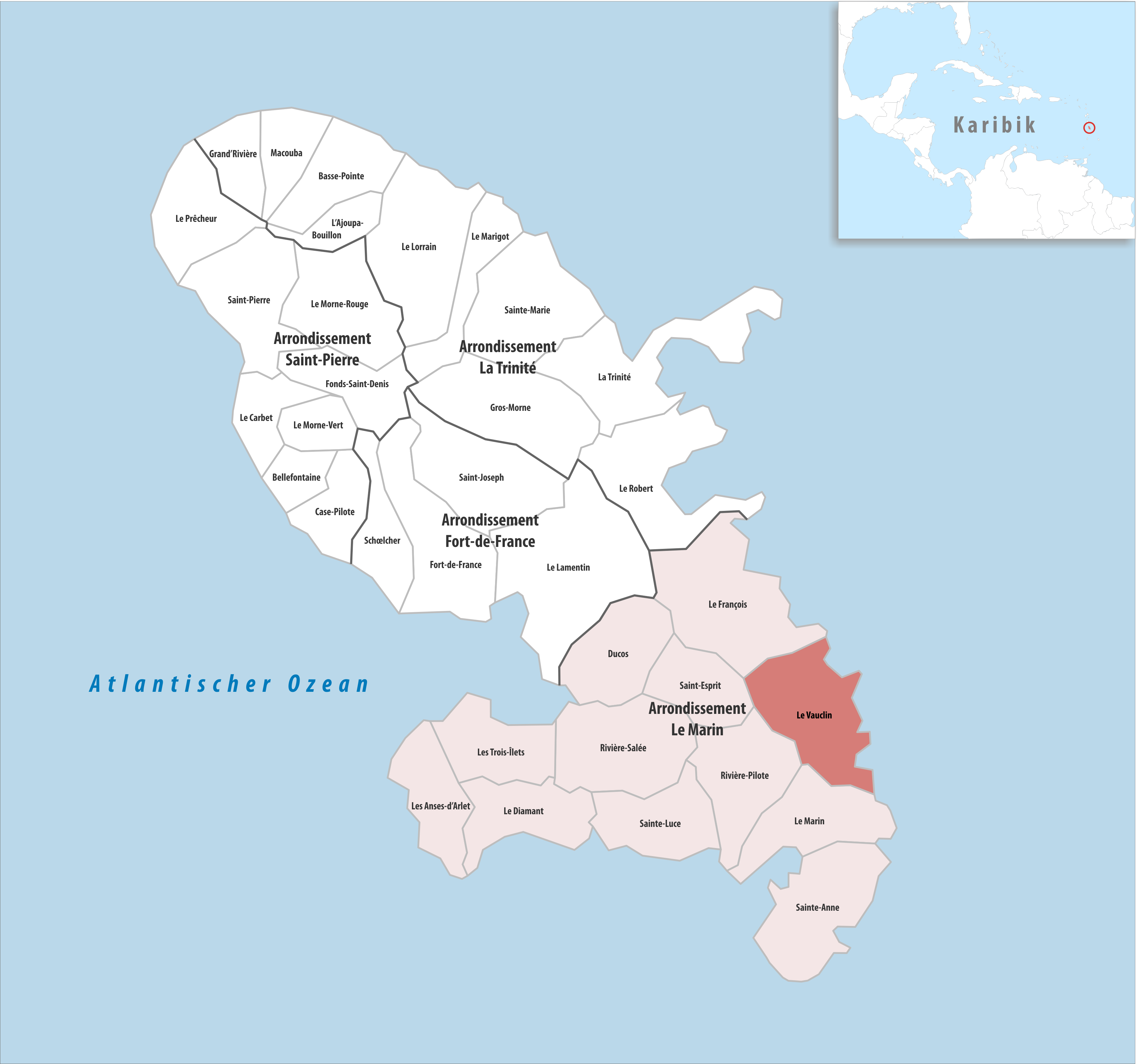
- Location of the commune (in red) within Martinique
- Location of Le Vauclin
- Coordinates: 14°32′40″N 60°50′20″W
- Country: France
- Overseas region and department: Martinique
- Arrondissement: Le Marin
- Intercommunality: CA Espace Sud de la Martinique

Government
  - Mayor (2024–2026): Jimmy Farreaux
- Area^{1}: 39.06 km^{2} (15.08 sq mi)
- Highest elevation: 504 m (1,654 ft)
- Lowest elevation: 0 m (0 ft)
- Population (2023): 8,483
  - Density: 217.2/km^{2} (562.5/sq mi)
- Demonym: Vauclinois·e (French)
- Time zone: UTC−04:00 (AST)
- INSEE/Postal code: 97232 /97280
- ^{1} French Land Register data, which excludes lakes, ponds, glaciers > 1 km^{2} (0.386 sq mi or 247 acres) and river estuaries.

Le Vauclin (French pronunciation: [lə voklɛ̃]; Martinican Creole: Voklen) is a commune in the French overseas department and region, and island of Martinique.

== Geography ==
Located in the southeast of the island, its neighboring communes are Le François, Saint-Esprit, Rivière-Pilote and Le Marin.

An UCPA sports centre (Union nationale des centres sportifs de plein air) was located in the town.

=== Climate ===
Le Vauclin has a tropical monsoon climate (Köppen climate classification Am) closely bordering on a tropical savanna climate (Aw). The average annual temperature in Le Vauclin is 27.3 °C (81.1 °F). The average annual rainfall is 1,229.7 mm (48.41 in) with November as the wettest month. The temperatures are highest on average in August and September, at around 28.2 °C (82.8 °F), and lowest in February, at around 25.9 °C (78.6 °F). The highest temperature ever recorded in Le Vauclin was 35.1 °C (95.2 °F) on 29 September 2023; the coldest temperature ever recorded was 18.4 °C (65.1 °F) on 11 December 2022.

Climate data for Le Vauclin (1991−2020 normals, extremes 1992−present)
Month	Jan	Feb	Mar	Apr	May	Jun	Jul	Aug	Sep	Oct	Nov	Dec	Year
Record high °C (°F)	31.1 (88.0)	32.1 (89.8)	31.9 (89.4)	33.3 (91.9)	33.5 (92.3)	33.2 (91.8)	33.3 (91.9)	34.6 (94.3)	35.1 (95.2)	34.8 (94.6)	32.8 (91.0)	31.8 (89.2)	35.1 (95.2)
Mean daily maximum °C (°F)	27.8 (82.0)	27.8 (82.0)	28.2 (82.8)	29.0 (84.2)	29.7 (85.5)	29.8 (85.6)	29.9 (85.8)	30.3 (86.5)	30.7 (87.3)	30.3 (86.5)	29.4 (84.9)	28.5 (83.3)	29.3 (84.7)
Daily mean °C (°F)	26.0 (78.8)	25.9 (78.6)	26.3 (79.3)	27.0 (80.6)	27.8 (82.0)	28.0 (82.4)	28.0 (82.4)	28.2 (82.8)	28.2 (82.8)	27.9 (82.2)	27.3 (81.1)	26.6 (79.9)	27.3 (81.1)
Mean daily minimum °C (°F)	24.2 (75.6)	24.0 (75.2)	24.3 (75.7)	25.1 (77.2)	25.9 (78.6)	26.2 (79.2)	26.1 (79.0)	26.1 (79.0)	25.8 (78.4)	25.5 (77.9)	25.2 (77.4)	24.8 (76.6)	25.3 (77.5)
Record low °C (°F)	19.9 (67.8)	19.2 (66.6)	19.4 (66.9)	20.2 (68.4)	20.9 (69.6)	22.1 (71.8)	22.2 (72.0)	21.0 (69.8)	21.8 (71.2)	21.8 (71.2)	21.2 (70.2)	18.4 (65.1)	18.4 (65.1)
Average precipitation mm (inches)	54.6 (2.15)	43.0 (1.69)	45.2 (1.78)	85.0 (3.35)	86.9 (3.42)	99.4 (3.91)	114.2 (4.50)	137.4 (5.41)	143.3 (5.64)	160.6 (6.32)	181.9 (7.16)	78.2 (3.08)	1,229.7 (48.41)
Average precipitation days (≥ 1.0 mm)	12.5	9.2	9.4	9.0	10.9	13.0	16.8	16.1	14.2	15.8	16.1	13.3	156.3
Source: Météo-France

== Population ==
Its inhabitants are known in French as Vauclinois (masculine) and Vauclinoises (feminine).

Historical population
Year	Pop.	±% p.a.
1967	7,732	—
1974	7,711	−0.04%
1982	6,950	−1.29%
1990	7,741	+1.36%
1999	7,778	+0.05%
2007	8,818	+1.58%
2012	9,140	+0.72%
2017	8,844	−0.66%
2023	8,483	−0.69%
Source: INSEE

== History ==
The dwelling of the Lord of Vauquelin has left its name to the quarter introduced as commune in 1837.

== Sports ==
- Kitesurfing
- Yole

== See also ==
- Communes of Martinique
