= Communes of the Martinique department =

The following is a list of the 34 communes of the Martinique overseas department of France.

The communes cooperate in the following intercommunalities (as of 2025):

- Communauté d'agglomération du Centre de la Martinique
- Communauté d'agglomération de l'Espace Sud de la Martinique
- Communauté d'agglomération du Pays Nord Martinique

INSEE code	Postal code	Commune name
97201	97216	L'Ajoupa-Bouillon
97202	97217	Les Anses-d'Arlet
97203	97218	Basse-Pointe
97234	97222	Bellefontaine
97204	97221	Le Carbet
97205	97222	Case-Pilote
97206	97223	Le Diamant
97207	97224	Ducos
97208	97250	Fonds-Saint-Denis
97209	97200	Fort-de-France
97210	97240	Le François
97211	97218	Grand'Rivière
97212	97213	Gros-Morne
97213	97232	Le Lamentin
97214	97214	Le Lorrain
97215	97218	Macouba
97216	97225	Le Marigot
97217	97290	Le Marin
97218	97260	Le Morne-Rouge
97233	97226	Le Morne-Vert
97219	97250	Le Prêcheur
97220	97211	Rivière-Pilote
97221	97215	Rivière-Salée
97222	97231	Le Robert
97226	97227	Sainte-Anne
97227	97228	Sainte-Luce
97228	97230	Sainte-Marie
97223	97270	Saint-Esprit
97224	97212	Saint-Joseph
97225	97250	Saint-Pierre
97229	97233	Schœlcher
97230	97220	La Trinité
97231	97229	Les Trois-Îlets
97232	97280	Le Vauclin
