= Trois-Rivières, Martinique =

Hamlet in Martinique

Trois-Rivières
- Hamlet
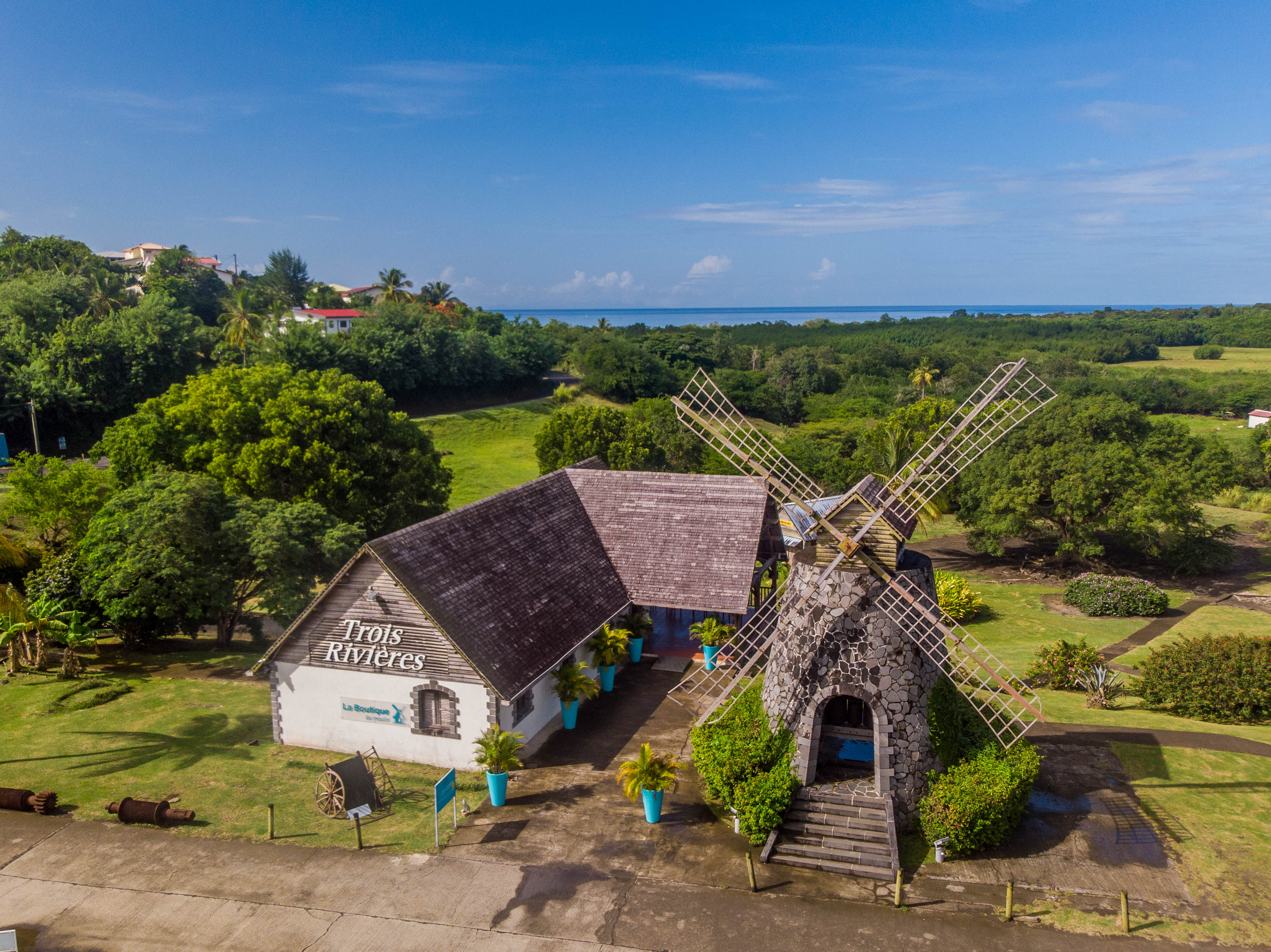
- Rhum Trois Rivières, the hamlet's distillery
- Etymology: French for "three rivers"
- Location within Martinique
- Coordinates: 14°28′48″N 60°57′50″W
- Country: France
- Subregion: West Indies
- Archipalego: Lesser Antilles
- Island: Martinique
- Commune: Sainte-Luce
- Time zone: UTC-4:00 (Martinique Time)

Trois-Rivières is a village on the southwest coast of Martinique, located within the commune of Sainte-Luce. It is known for its distillery/plantation called Rhum Trois Rivières, which is located in the north of the village.
