= Anicia Berton =

Martiniquais social and environmental activist (1975/1976–2026)

Anicia Berton (1975 or 1976 – 21 July 2026), nicknamed Az Fanm Djok, was a Martiniquais social and environmental activist. She was honored as Martinique's woman of the year in 2019 for her activism.

== Biography ==
Anicia Berton began her activism in 2013 by participating in protests against aerial spraying, and learned the same year that she had breast cancer. She was then diagnosed with blood cancer in 2018. According to Rosalie Gaschet, president of Assaupamar, her blood cancer was allegedly caused by widely sold defective breast implants manufactured by Poly Implant Prothèse placed after a mastectomy due to her breast cancer. According to Gaschet, Berton was never contacted to have them removed. Berton blamed the widespread use of chlordecone, an insecticide which contaminated large parts of Martinique from the 1960s to the 1990s, and other pesticides, for cancer clusters and other illnesses on Martinique. She became a leading opponent of the use of chlordecone.

Anicia Berton chaired the Nasyon Matinik association, in which she protested land seizures, sargassum, the use of pesticides, and other threats to the environment of Martinique. She was also a member of Assaupamar, an organization which seeks protections for the environment in Martinique, as well.

In January 2021, she organized a demonstration in front of the Ministry of the Overseas headquarters in Paris after the dismissal of a criminal case regarding the usage of chlordecone.

Berton campaigned for the official recognition of the red, green, and black flag of Martinique, which was adopted in 2023.

Berton was also a leading advocate for the use of the red, green, and black flag of Martinique, which was officially adopted in 2023.

She was originally from the village and commune of Sainte-Anne in southern Martinique. Berton died from cancer on 21 July 2026, at the age of 50. Berton was survived by her four children.
