= Rivière-Salée =

- Commune
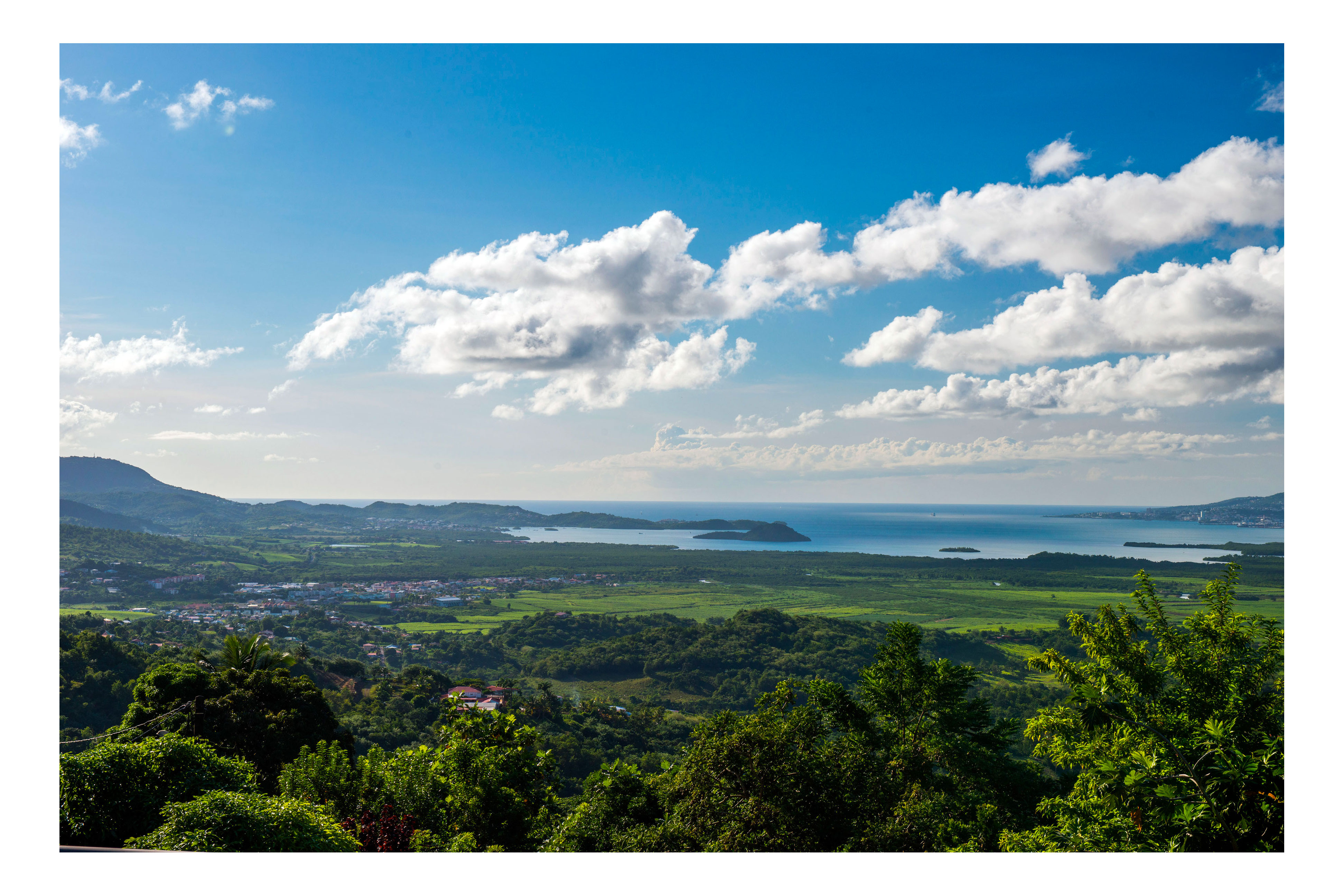

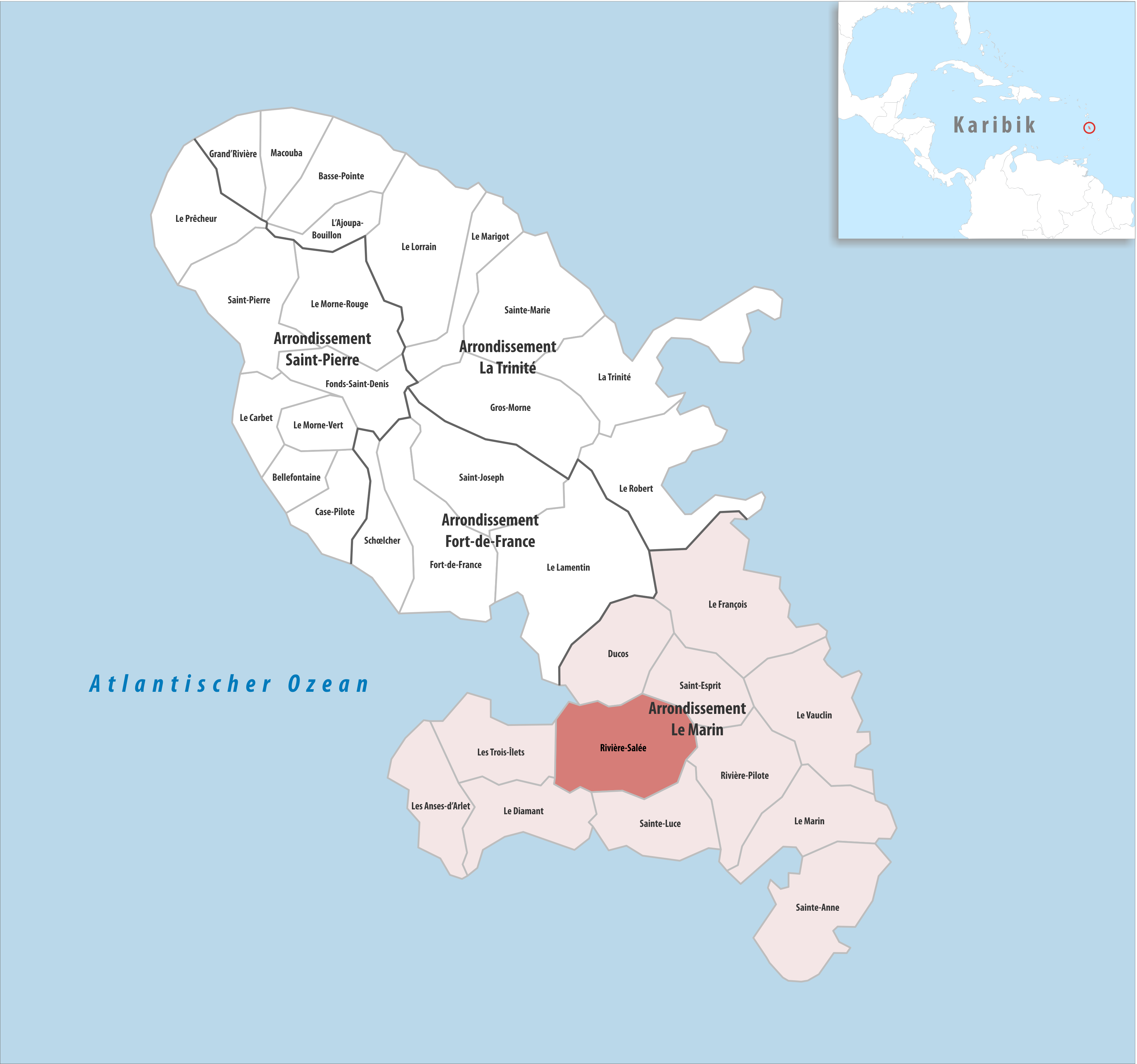
- Location of the commune (in red) within Martinique
- Location of Rivière-Salée
- Location within France
- Coordinates: 14°31′40″N 60°58′50″W
- Country: France
- Overseas region and department: Martinique
- Arrondissement: Le Marin
- Intercommunality: CA Espace Sud de la Martinique

Government
  - Mayor (2020–2026): André Lesueur
- Area^{1}: 39.38 km^{2} (15.20 sq mi)
- Highest elevation: 323 m (1,060 ft)
- Lowest elevation: 0 m (0 ft)
- Population (2023): 11,829
  - Density: 300.4/km^{2} (778.0/sq mi)
- Time zone: UTC−04:00 (AST)
- INSEE/Postal code: 97221 /97215
- ^{1} French Land Register data, which excludes lakes, ponds, glaciers > 1 km^{2} (0.386 sq mi or 247 acres) and river estuaries.

Rivière-Salée (French pronunciation: [ʁivjɛʁ sale], literally Salty River; Martinican Creole: Larivièsalé, Rivièsalé or Lavièsalé) is a town and commune in the French overseas department and region of Martinique.

== Population ==
Historical population
Year	Pop.	±% p.a.
1967	7,227	—
1974	7,020	−0.41%
1982	6,757	−0.48%
1990	8,753	+3.29%
1999	12,276	+3.83%
2007	13,106	+0.82%
2012	12,708	−0.61%
2017	12,168	−0.86%
2023	11,829	−0.47%
Source: INSEE

== Notable people ==
- André Lesueur (born 1947), mayor of Rivière-Salée and former member of the French National Assembly

== See also ==
- Communes of the Martinique department
