= Gros-Morne, Martinique =

Gros-Morne
- Commune
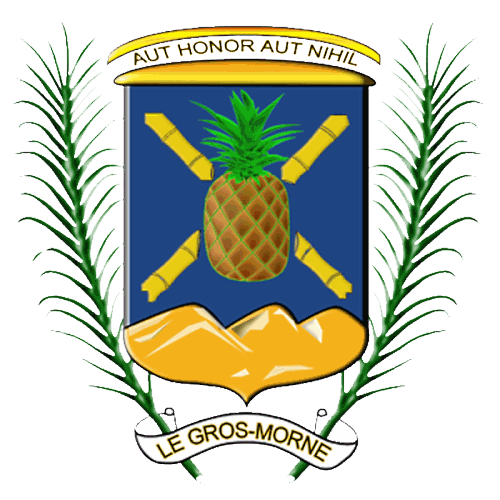
- Coat of arms

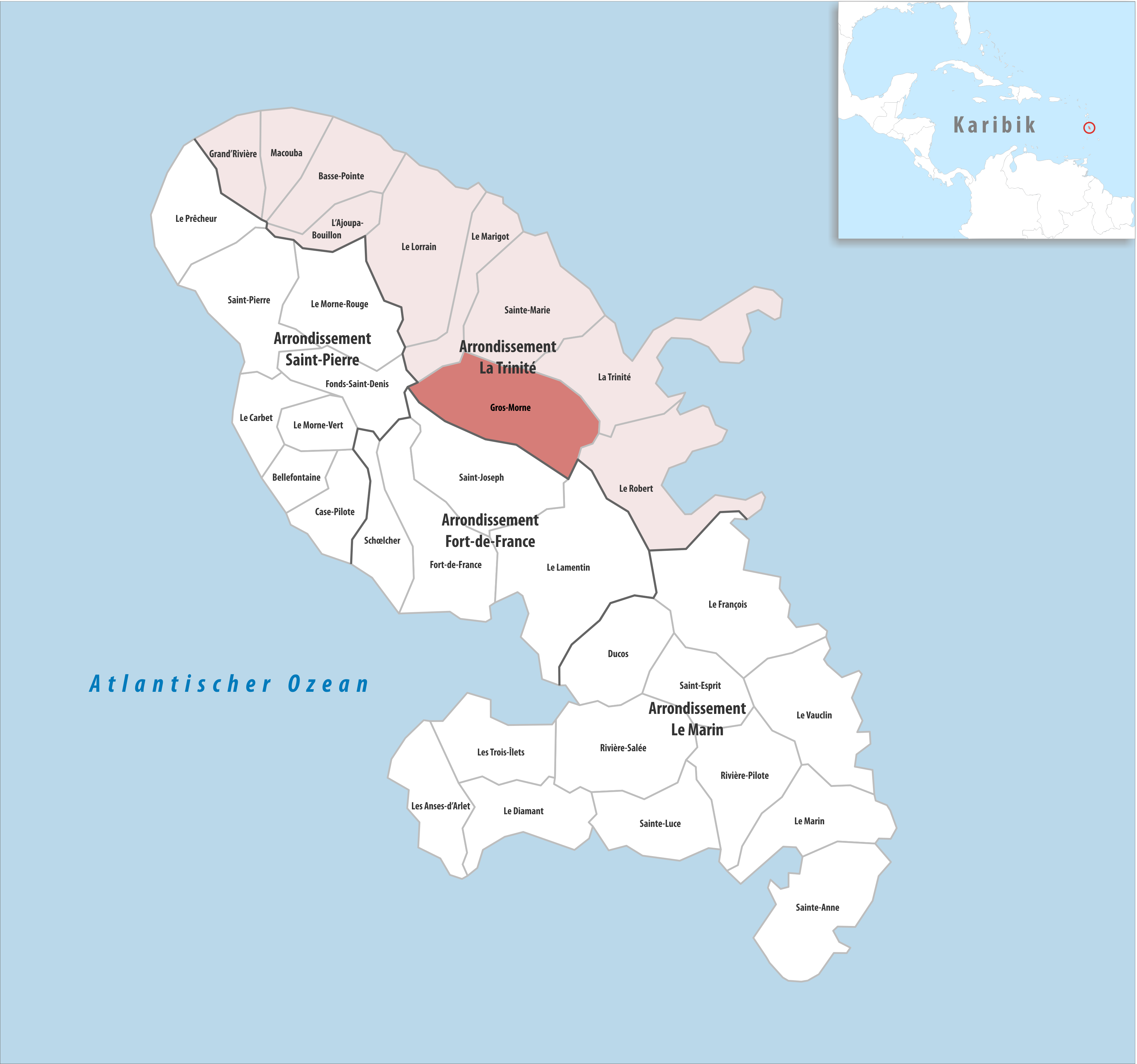
- Location of the commune (in red) within Martinique
- Location of Gros-Morne
- Coordinates: 14°42′N 61°00′W
- Country: France
- Overseas region and department: Martinique
- Arrondissement: La Trinité
- Intercommunality: CA Pays Nord Martinique

Government
  - Mayor (2020–2026): Gilbert Couturier
- Area^{1}: 54.25 km^{2} (20.95 sq mi)
- Highest elevation: 781 m (2,562 ft)
- Lowest elevation: 34 m (112 ft)
- Population (2023): 9,610
  - Density: 177/km^{2} (459/sq mi)
- Time zone: UTC−04:00 (AST)
- INSEE/Postal code: 97212 /97213
- ^{1} French Land Register data, which excludes lakes, ponds, glaciers > 1 km^{2} (0.386 sq mi or 247 acres) and river estuaries.

Gros-Morne (French pronunciation: [ɡʁo mɔʁn]; Martinican Creole: Gwomòn) is a town and commune in the French overseas department of Martinique, and one of the least-developed on the island.

== Population ==
Historical population
| Year | Pop. | ±% p.a. |
|---|---|---|
| 1967 | 10,541 | — |
| 1974 | 10,038 | −0.70% |
| 1982 | 9,276 | −0.98% |
| 1990 | 10,143 | +1.12% |
| 1999 | 10,665 | +0.56% |
| 2007 | 10,765 | +0.12% |
| 2012 | 10,250 | −0.98% |
| 2017 | 9,869 | −0.75% |
| 2023 | 9,610 | −0.44% |
Source: INSEE

== See also ==
- Communes of the Martinique department
