= Les Trois-Îlets =

- Commune
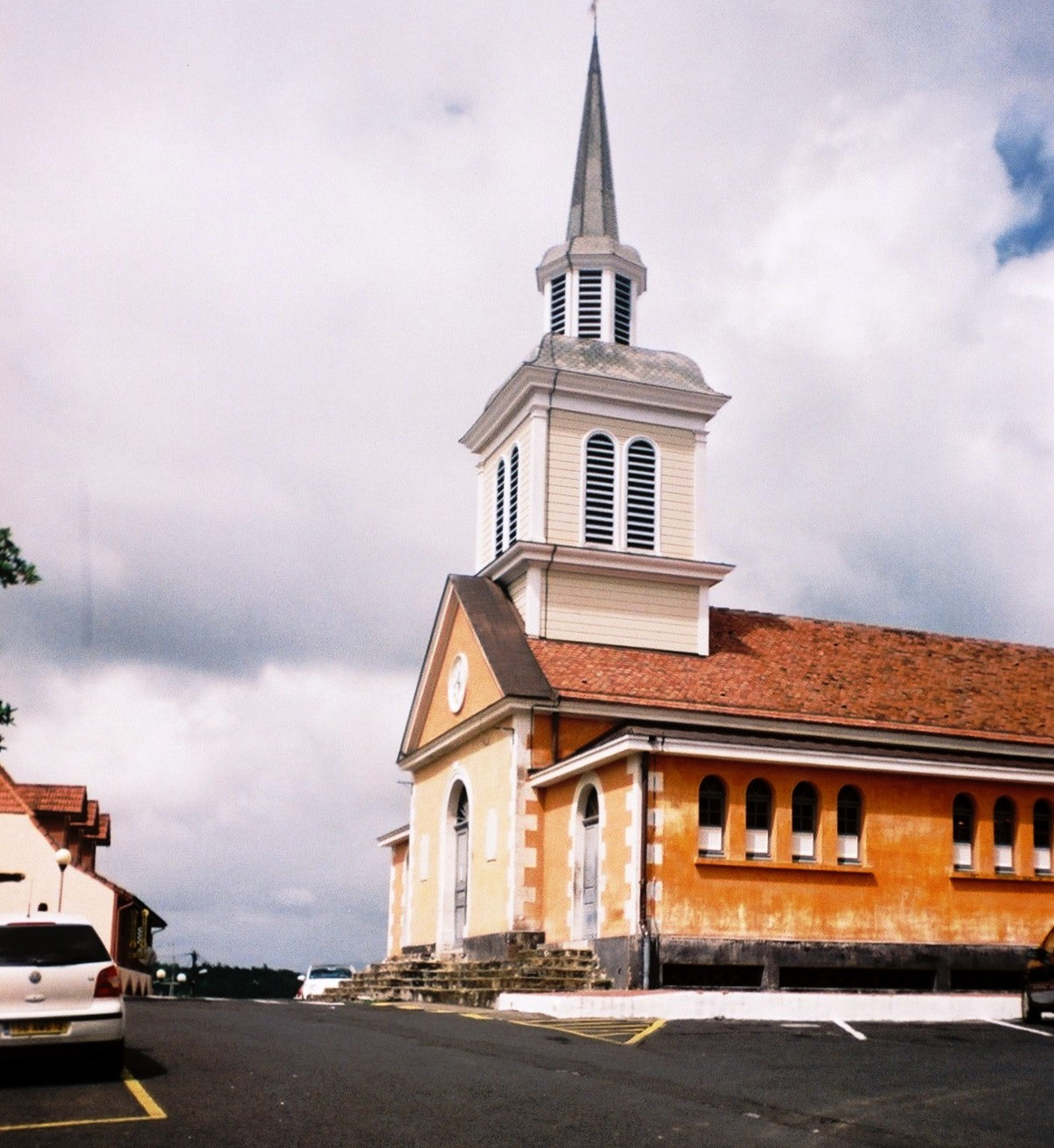
- The church in Les Trois-Îlets

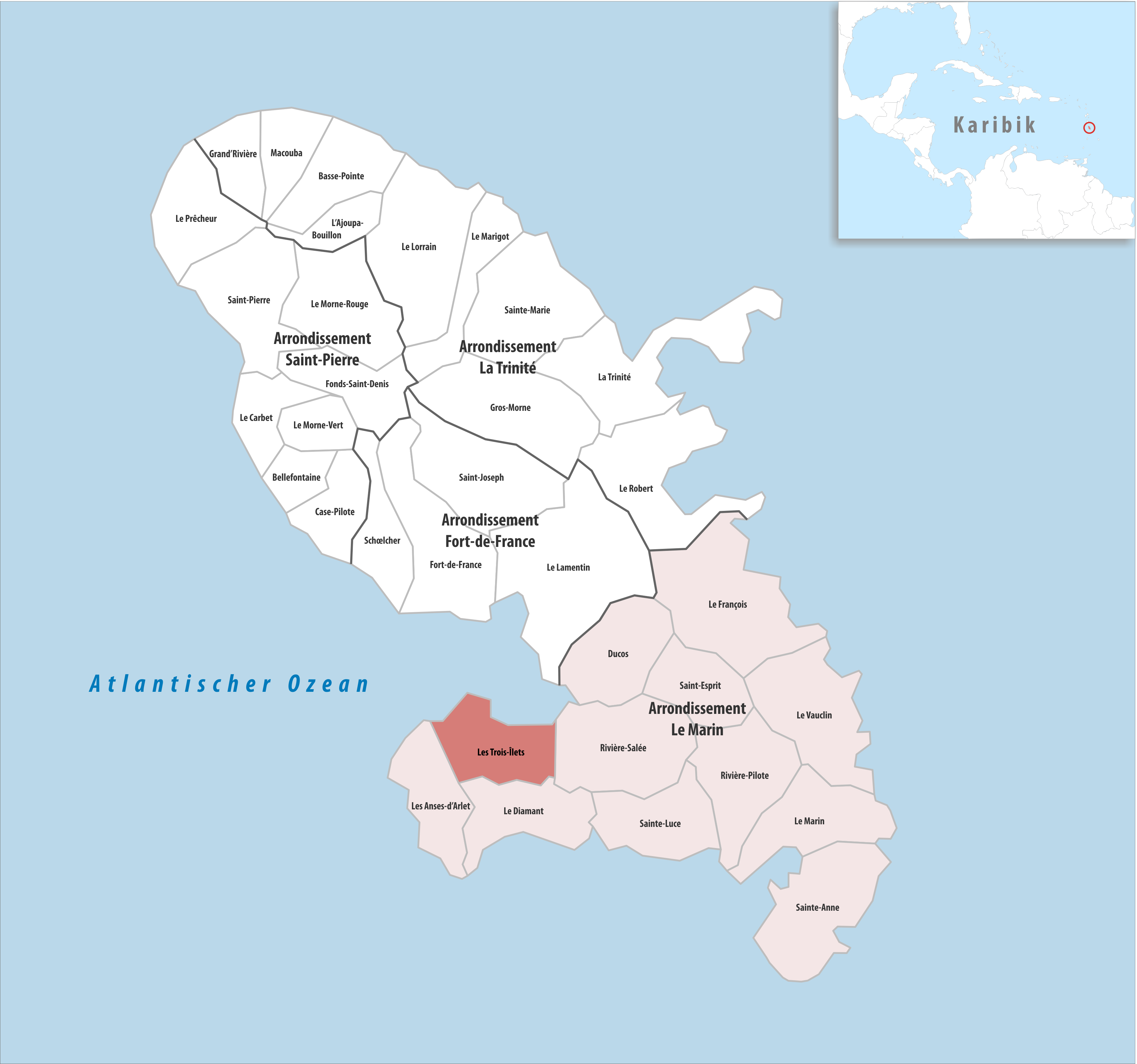
- Location of the commune (in red) within Martinique
- Location of Les Trois-Îlets
- Location within France
- Coordinates: 14°32′N 61°02′W
- Country: France
- Overseas region and department: Martinique
- Arrondissement: Le Marin
- Intercommunality: CA Espace Sud de la Martinique

Government
  - Mayor (2020–2026): Arnaud René-Corail
- Area^{1}: 28.60 km^{2} (11.04 sq mi)
- Highest elevation: 400 m (1,300 ft)
- Lowest elevation: 0 m (0 ft)
- Population (2023): 6,507
  - Density: 227.5/km^{2} (589.3/sq mi)
- Time zone: UTC−04:00 (AST)
- INSEE/Postal code: 97231 /97229
- ^{1} French Land Register data, which excludes lakes, ponds, glaciers > 1 km^{2} (0.386 sq mi or 247 acres) and river estuaries.

Les Trois-Îlets (French pronunciation: [le tʁwɑz‿ilɛ], literally The Three Islets; Martinican Creole: Twazilé) is a town and commune in the French overseas department and region of Martinique.

It was the place of baptism and possibly the birthplace of Joséphine (1763–1814), who married Napoleon Bonaparte and became Empress of the French.

The town also features La Savane Des Esclaves (a living history museum/park that showcases 400 years of Martinique’s history).

== Population ==
Historical population
Year	Pop.	±% p.a.
1967	3,153	—
1974	3,002	−0.70%
1982	3,246	+0.98%
1990	4,484	+4.12%
1999	5,162	+1.58%
2007	7,084	+4.04%
2012	7,587	+1.38%
2017	7,339	−0.66%
2023	6,507	−1.99%
Source: INSEE

== See also ==
- Communes of the Martinique department
