= Les Anses-d'Arlet =

- Commune
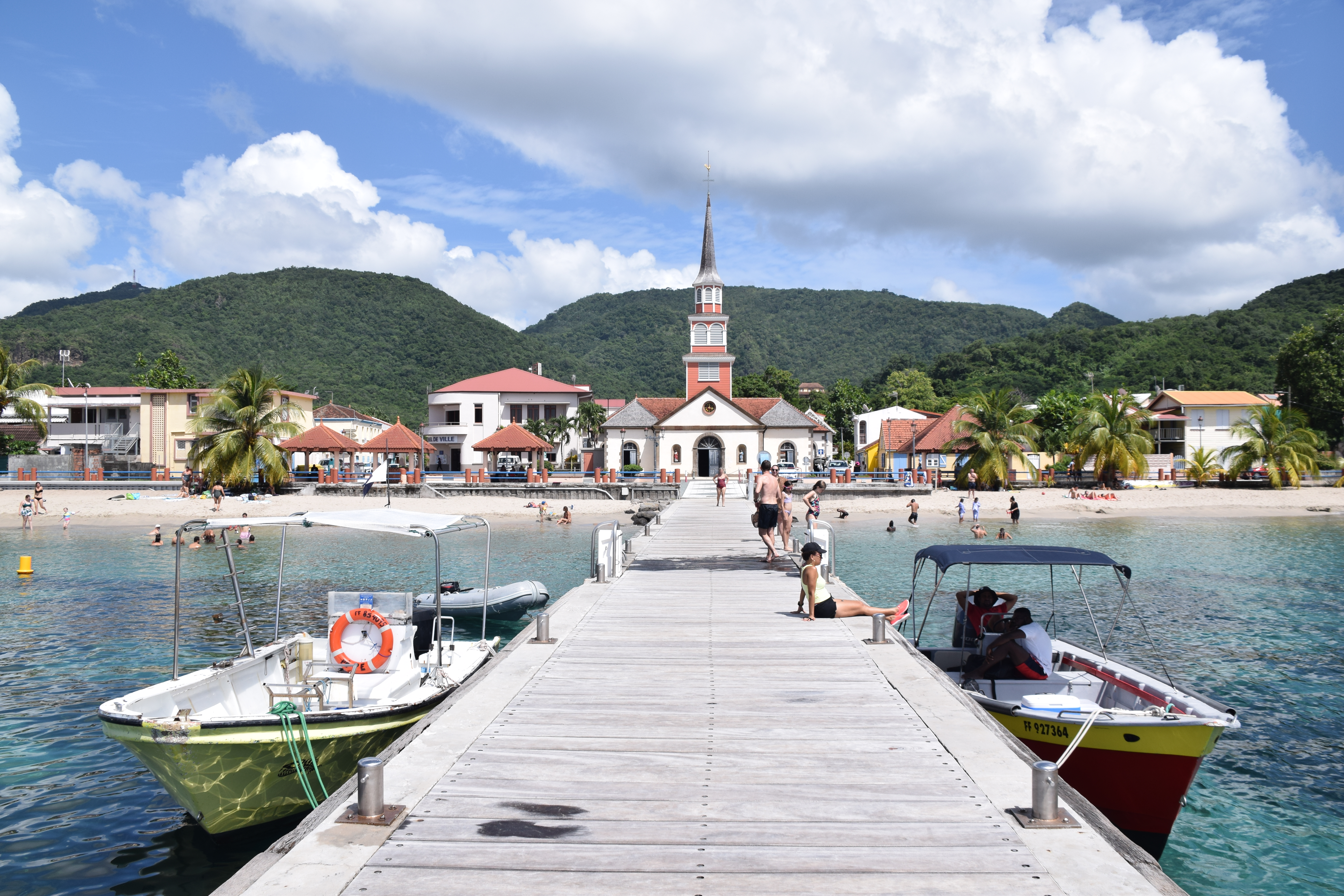
- View of Les Anses-d'Arlet from the main pier.

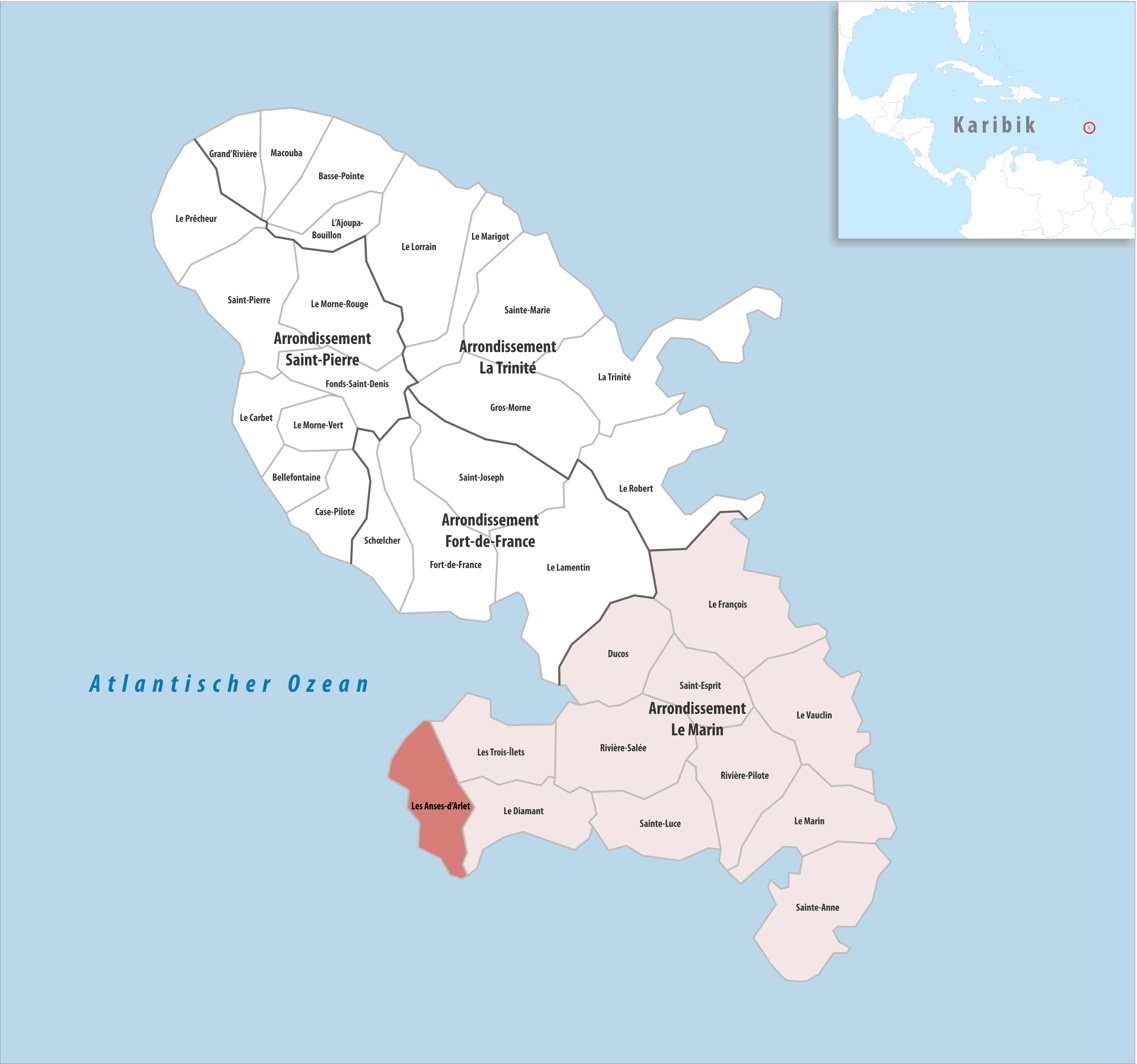
- Location of the commune (in red) within Martinique
- Location of Les Anses-d'Arlet
- Location within France
- Coordinates: 14°29′26″N 61°04′50″W
- Country: France
- Overseas region and department: Martinique
- Arrondissement: Le Marin
- Intercommunality: CA Espace Sud de la Martinique

Government
  - Mayor (2020–2026): Eugène Larcher
- Area^{1}: 25.92 km^{2} (10.01 sq mi)
- Highest elevation: 47 m (154 ft)
- Lowest elevation: 0 m (0 ft)
- Population (2023): 3,912
  - Density: 150.9/km^{2} (390.9/sq mi)
- Time zone: UTC−04:00 (AST)
- INSEE/Postal code: 97202 /97217
- ^{1} French Land Register data, which excludes lakes, ponds, glaciers > 1 km^{2} (0.386 sq mi or 247 acres) and river estuaries.

Les Anses-d'Arlet (French pronunciation: [lez‿ɑ̃s daʁlɛ]; Martinican Creole: Lansdalé) is a town and commune in the French overseas department and region of Martinique.

== Population ==
Historical population
Year	Pop.	±% p.a.
1967	3,573	—
1974	3,067	−2.16%
1982	2,811	−1.08%
1990	3,238	+1.78%
1999	3,463	+0.75%
2007	3,787	+1.12%
2012	3,900	+0.59%
2017	3,587	−1.66%
2023	3,912	+1.46%
Source: INSEE

== Gallery ==
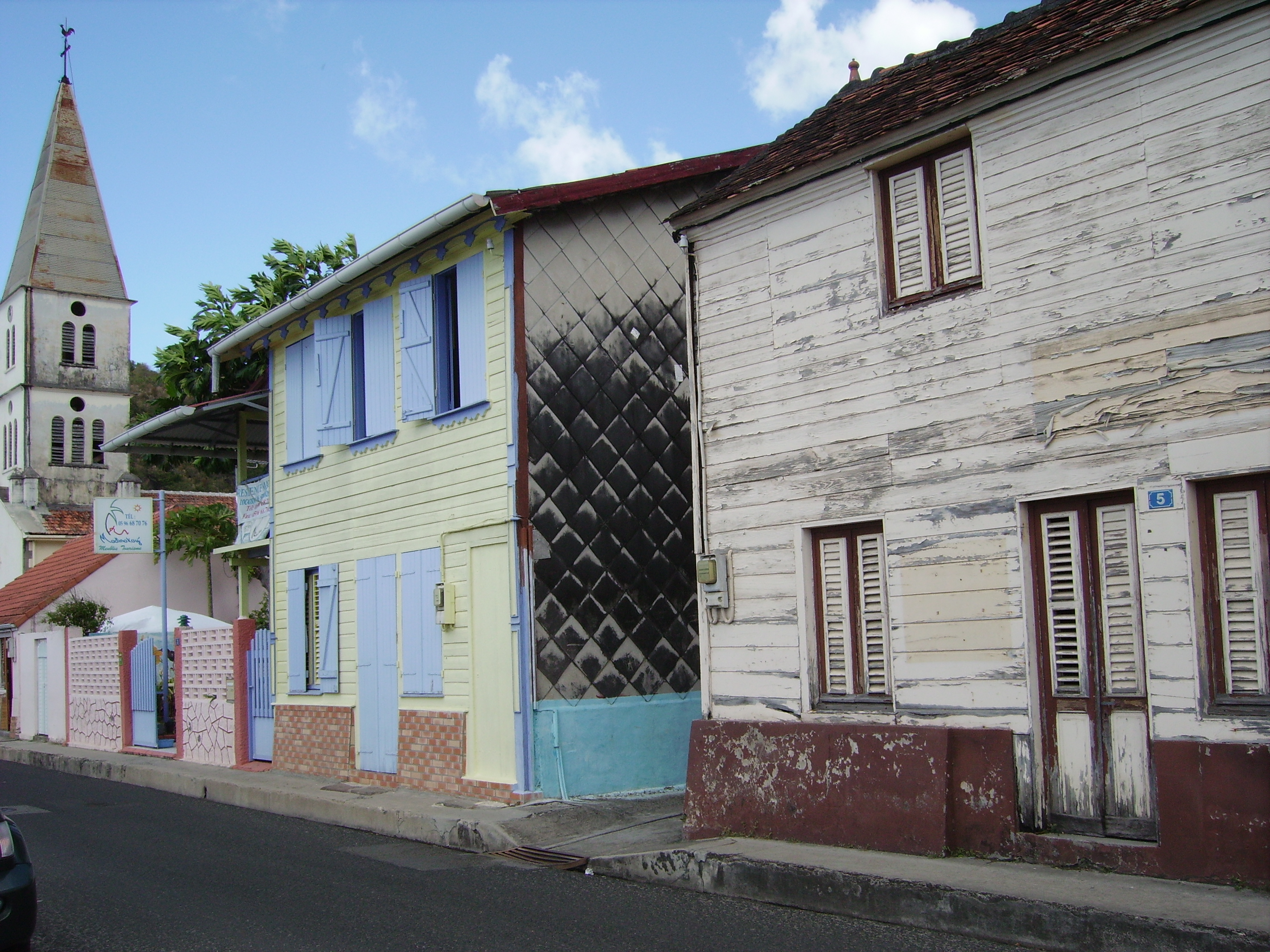
A view of a street in Les Anses-d'Arlet.

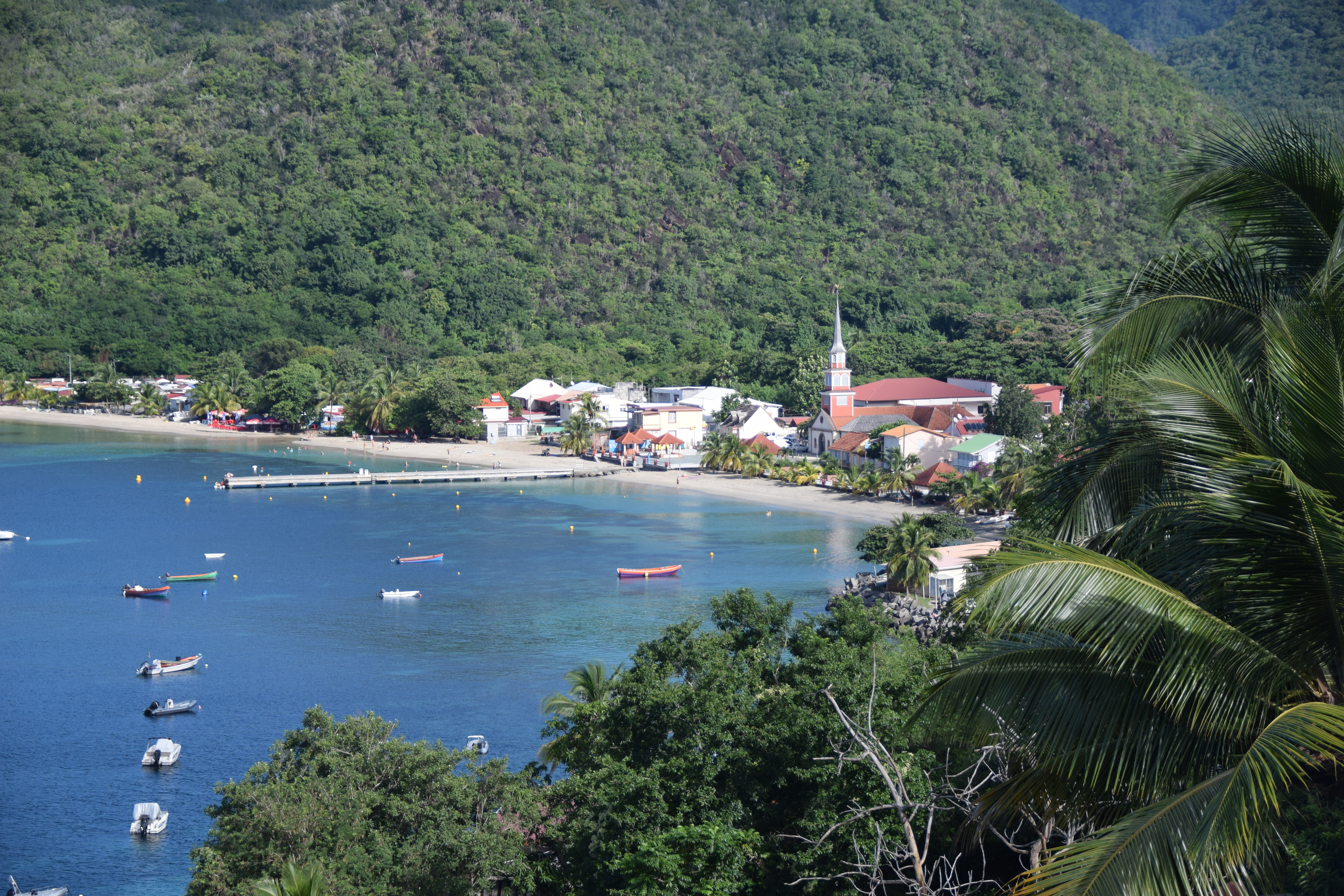
View of the town center.

== See also ==
- Communes of the Martinique department
