= André Lesueur =

André Lesueur (born 26 October 1947 in Rivière-Salée, Martinique) is a politician from Martinique who served in the French National Assembly from 1993 to 1997. He was a member of the Regional Council of Martinique from 2010 to 2015.

== Local positions ==
- 1989–1995, 1995–2001, 2001–2008, 2008-: Mayor of Rivière-Salée
- 1992–1998, 1998–2004, 2004–2010: Conseiller général of the canton of Rivière-Salée
- 2010-2015 Conseiller régional of Martinique
