= Le Diamant =

- Commune
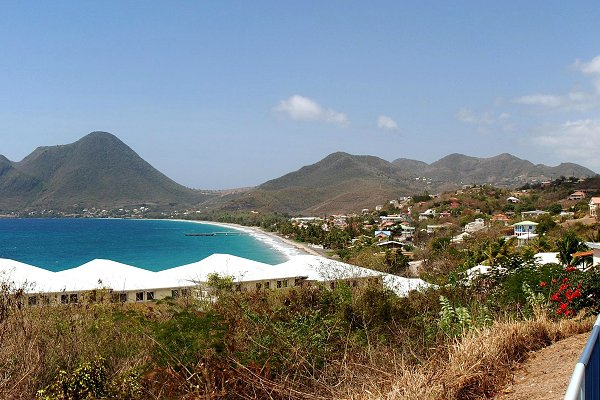
- Le Diamant with Le Morne Larcher in the background

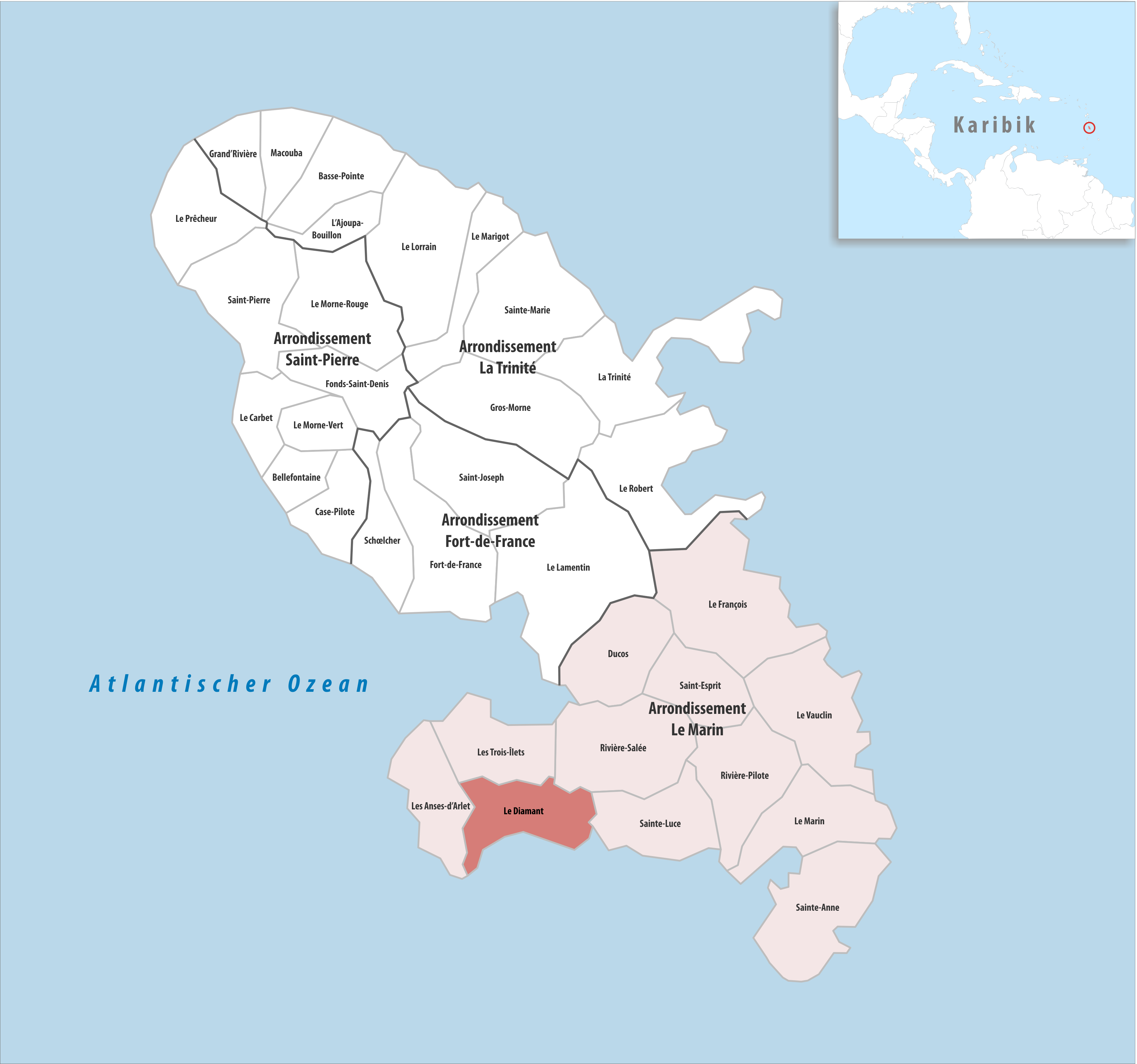
- Location of the commune (in red) within Martinique
- Location of Le Diamant
- Coordinates: 14°28′45″N 61°01′48″W
- Country: France
- Overseas region and department: Martinique
- Arrondissement: Le Marin
- Intercommunality: CA Espace Sud de la Martinique

Government
  - Mayor (2020–2026): Hugues Toussay
- Area^{1}: 27.34 km^{2} (10.56 sq mi)
- Highest elevation: 478 m (1,568 ft)
- Lowest elevation: 0 m (0 ft)
- Population (2023): 6,161
  - Density: 225.3/km^{2} (583.6/sq mi)
- Demonym: Diamantinois.e
- Time zone: UTC−04:00 (AST)
- INSEE/Postal code: 97206 /97223
- ^{1} French Land Register data, which excludes lakes, ponds, glaciers > 1 km^{2} (0.386 sq mi or 247 acres) and river estuaries.

Le Diamant (French pronunciation: [lə djamɑ̃]; Antillean Creole: Dianman or Diaman, lit. 'Diamond') is a town and commune in the French overseas department of Martinique.

== Geography ==
The town of Le Diamant is situated in southwestern Martinique, where the Diamond Rock is.

== Population ==
Historical population
| Year | Pop. | ±% p.a. |
|---|---|---|
| 1967 | 2,246 | — |
| 1974 | 2,007 | −1.59% |
| 1982 | 2,384 | +2.18% |
| 1990 | 3,343 | +4.32% |
| 1999 | 3,958 | +1.89% |
| 2007 | 5,602 | +4.44% |
| 2012 | 5,983 | +1.32% |
| 2017 | 5,642 | −1.17% |
| 2023 | 6,161 | +1.48% |
Source: INSEE

== Culture ==
Le Diamant is home to Laurent Valère's Cap 110 monument to victims of slavery.

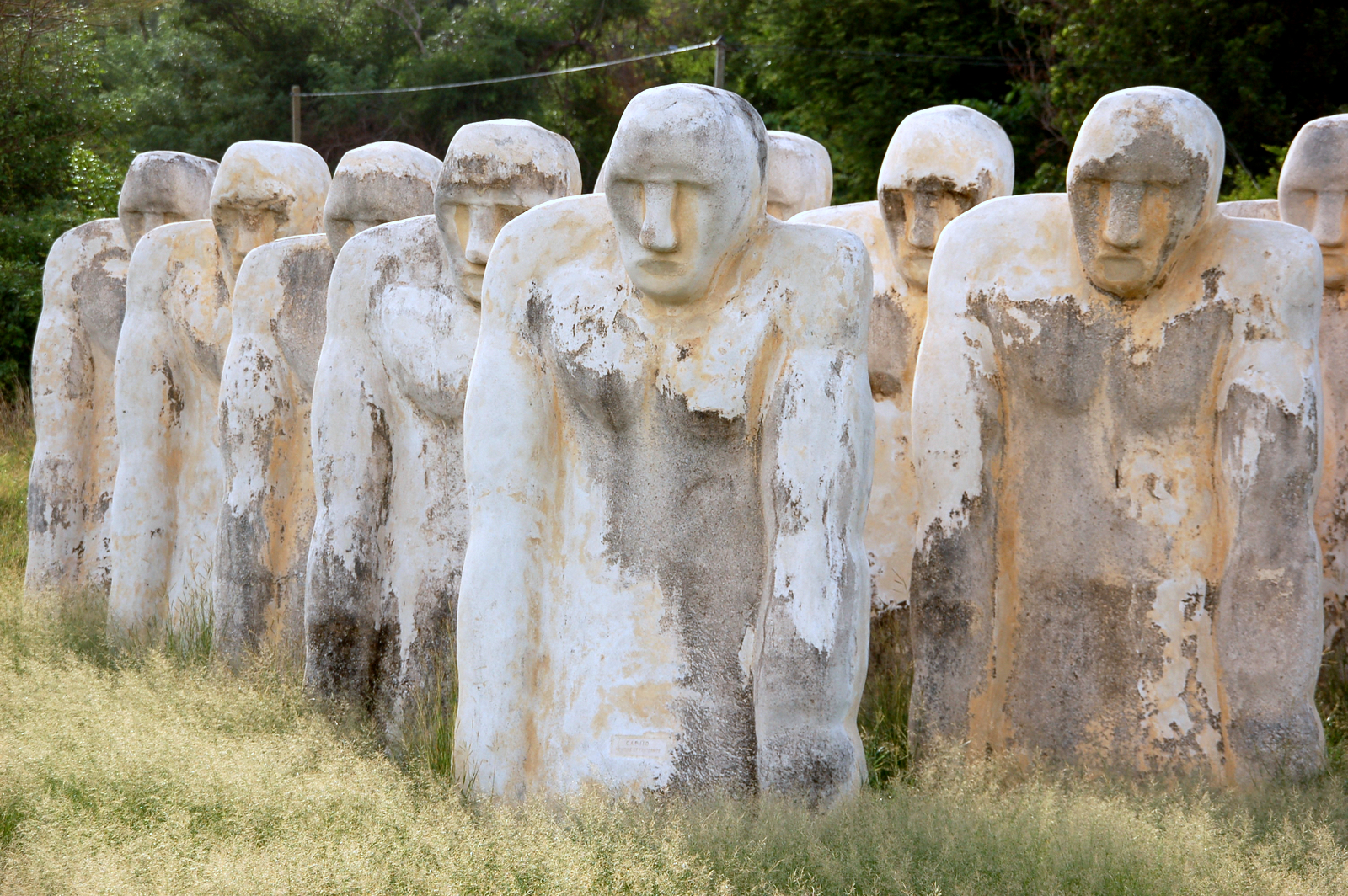
Laurent Valère's Cap 110

== See also ==
- Communes of Martinique
