= Communauté d'agglomération de l'Espace Sud de la Martinique =

Espace Sud de la Martinique
- Communauté d'agglomération
- Interactive map of Espace Sud de la Martinique
- Coordinates: 14°30′N 60°55′W
- Country: France
- Overseas region and department: Martinique{{{region}}}
- No. of communes: {{{nbcomm}}}
- Established: 2004
- Area: 409.1 km^{2} (158.0 sq mi)
- Population (2017): 116,168
  - Density: 284.0/km^{2} (735.5/sq mi)

Communauté d'agglomération de l'Espace Sud de la Martinique is an intercommunal structure in the Martinique overseas department and region of France. It was created in December 2004. Its seat is in Rivière-Salée. Its area is 409.1 km^{2}. Its population was 116,168 in 2017.

== Composition ==
The communauté d'agglomération consists of the following 12 communes:

1. Les Anses-d'Arlet
2. Le Diamant
3. Ducos
4. Le François
5. Le Marin
6. Rivière-Pilote
7. Rivière-Salée
8. Sainte-Anne
9. Sainte-Luce
10. Saint-Esprit
11. Les Trois-Îlets
12. Le Vauclin
