= Ducos, Martinique =

Ducos
- Commune
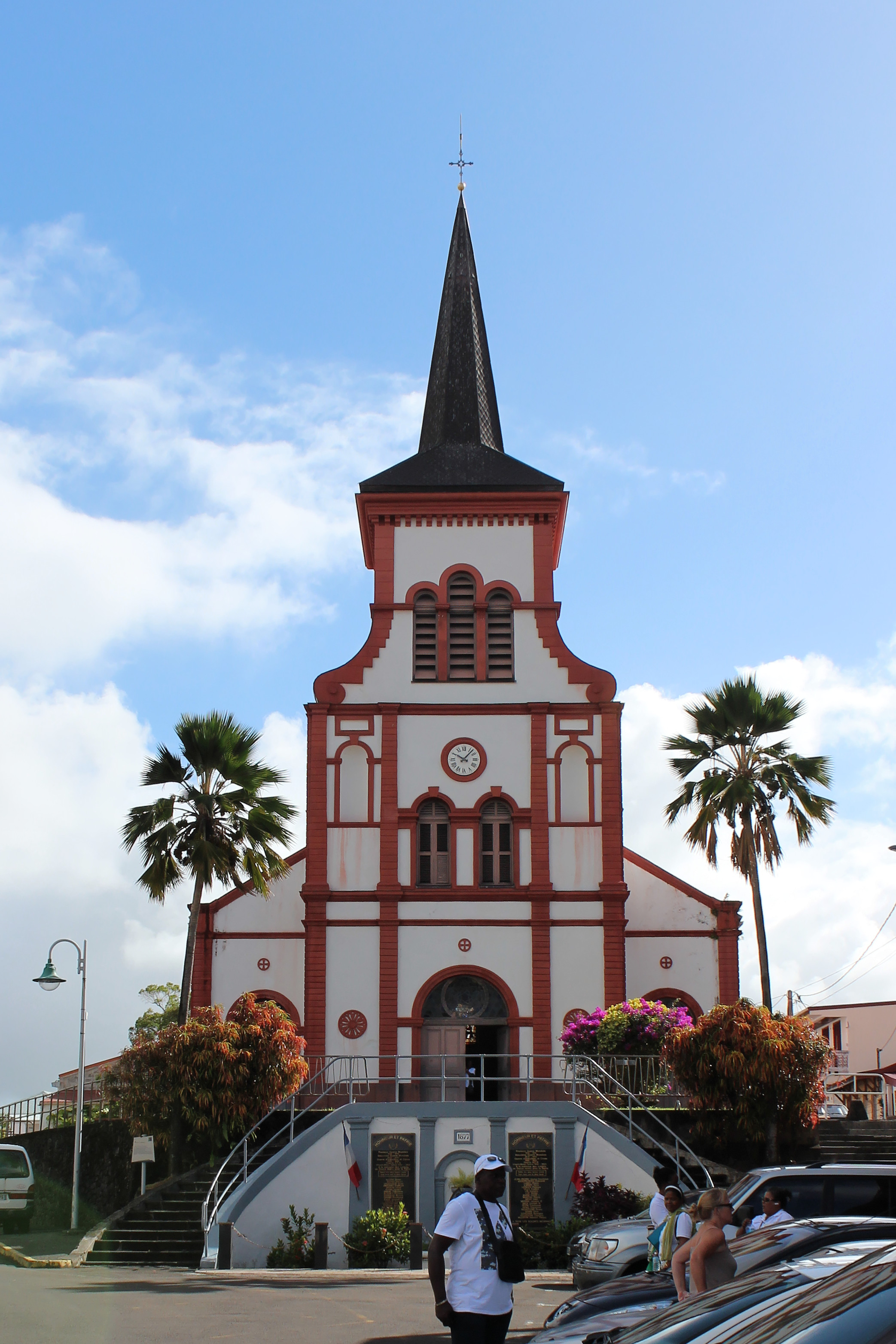
- The church of Our Lady of the Nativity, in Ducos

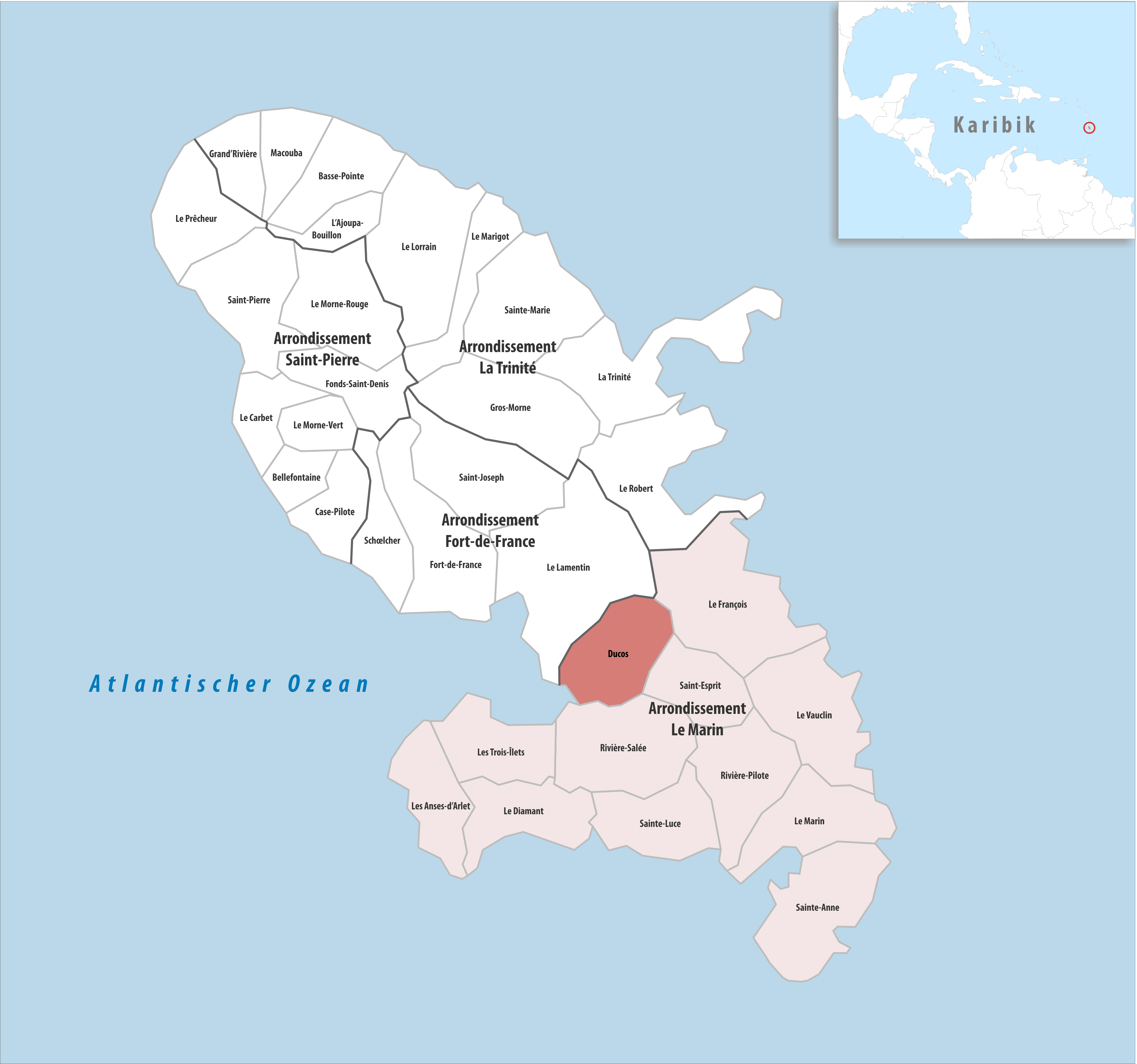
- Location of the commune (in red) within Martinique
- Location of Ducos
- Location within France
- Coordinates: 14°34′30″N 60°58′30″W
- Country: France
- Overseas region and department: Martinique
- Arrondissement: Le Marin
- Intercommunality: CA Espace Sud de la Martinique

Government
  - Mayor (2020–2026): Aurélie Nella
- Area^{1}: 37.69 km^{2} (14.55 sq mi)
- Highest elevation: 160 m (520 ft)
- Lowest elevation: 0 m (0 ft)
- Population (2023): 18,105
  - Density: 480.4/km^{2} (1,244/sq mi)
- Time zone: UTC−04:00 (AST)
- INSEE/Postal code: 97207 /97224
- ^{1} French Land Register data, which excludes lakes, ponds, glaciers > 1 km^{2} (0.386 sq mi or 247 acres) and river estuaries.

Ducos (French pronunciation: [dykɔs]; Martinican Creole: Dikos) is a town and commune in the French overseas department and region, and island of Martinique. It is where the prison is located.

It was called "Trou-au-chat" until 1855, and was renamed after the French politician Théodore Ducos.

== Population ==
Its inhabitants are called Ducossais in French.

Historical population
Year	Pop.	±% p.a.
1967	7,083	—
1974	6,930	−0.31%
1982	9,409	+3.90%
1990	12,401	+3.51%
1999	15,240	+2.32%
2007	16,122	+0.71%
2012	17,039	+1.11%
2017	17,367	+0.38%
2023	18,105	+0.70%
Source: INSEE
