= Sainte-Luce, Martinique =

Sainte-Luce
- Commune
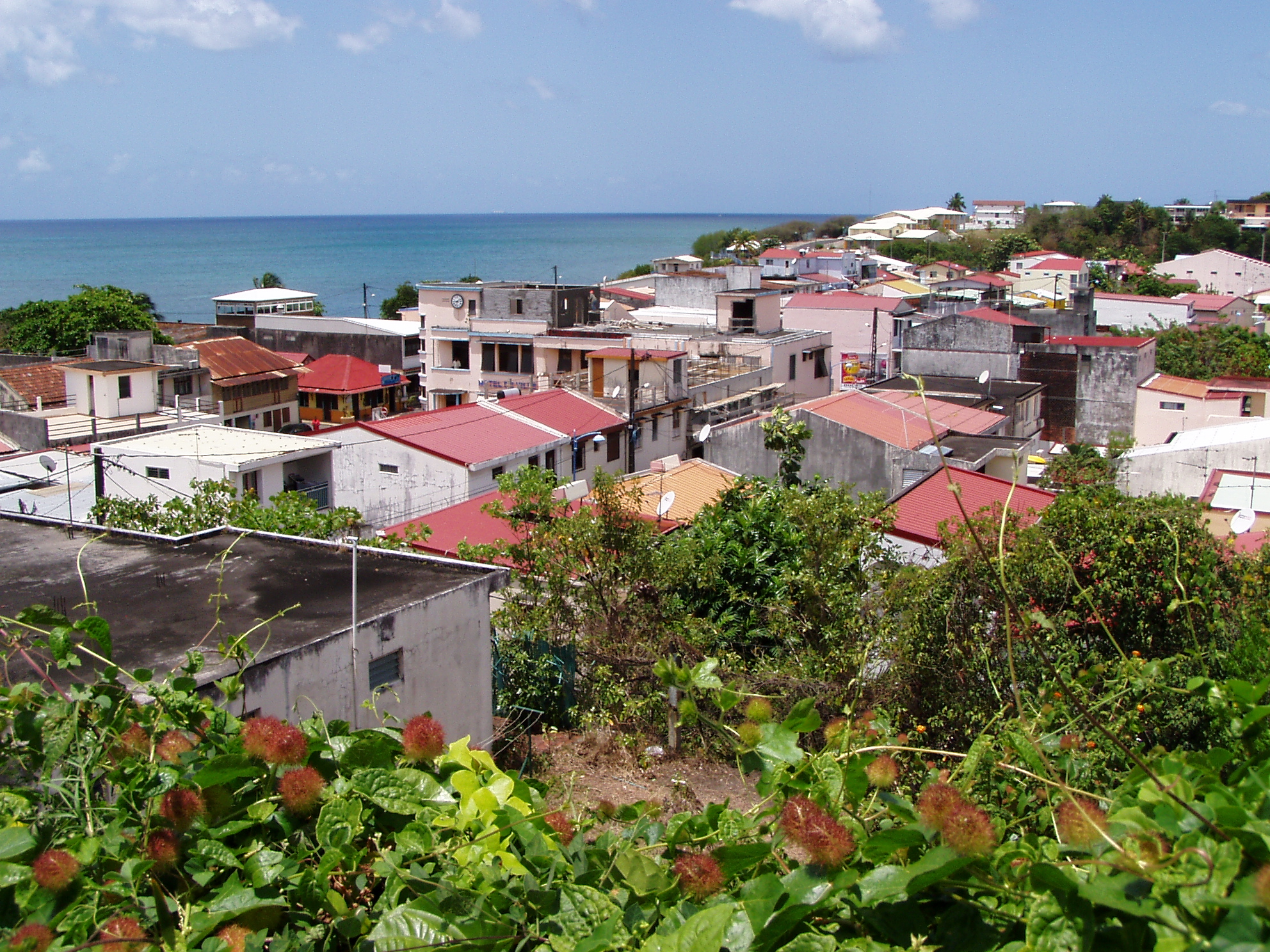
- A view of Saint-Luce, with the Caribbean Sea in the background

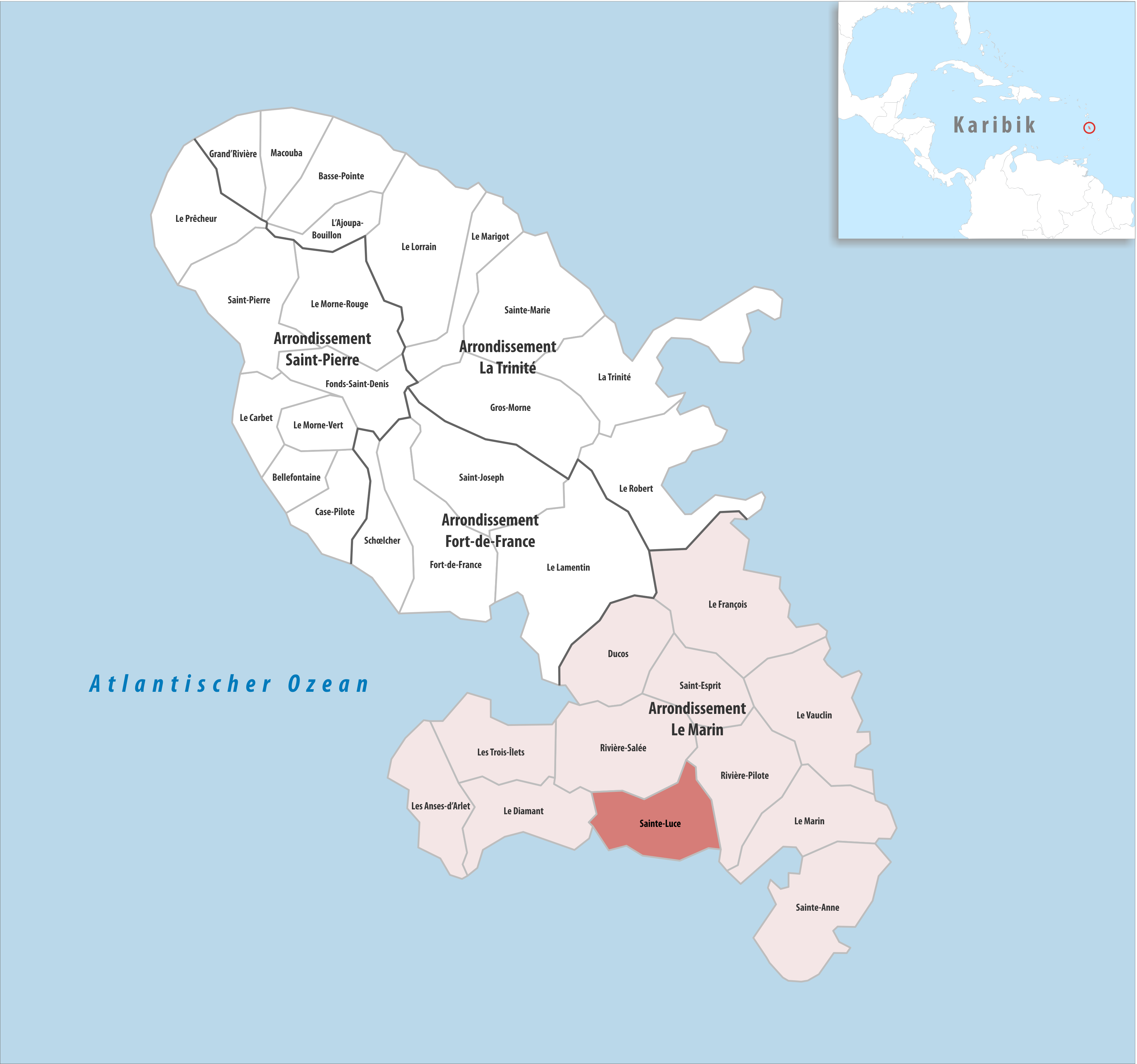
- Location of the commune (in red) within Martinique
- Location of Sainte-Luce
- Location within France
- Coordinates: 14°28′N 60°55′W
- Country: France
- Overseas region and department: Martinique
- Arrondissement: Le Marin
- Intercommunality: CA Espace Sud de la Martinique

Government
  - Mayor (2020–2026): Nicaise Monrose
- Area^{1}: 28.02 km^{2} (10.82 sq mi)
- Highest elevation: 371 m (1,217 ft)
- Lowest elevation: 0 m (0 ft)
- Population (2023): 9,410
  - Density: 336/km^{2} (870/sq mi)
- Time zone: UTC−04:00 (AST)
- INSEE/Postal code: 97227 /97228
- ^{1} French Land Register data, which excludes lakes, ponds, glaciers > 1 km^{2} (0.386 sq mi or 247 acres) and river estuaries.

Sainte-Luce (pronounced [sɛ̃t lys]) is a fishing town and commune in the French overseas department of Martinique. It contains the village of Trois-Rivières and its rhum factory. Located in the touristic south of the country, it is famous for its beautiful beaches and its picturesque port.

== Population ==
Historical population
Year	Pop.	±% p.a.
1967	3,978	—
1974	4,124	+0.52%
1982	4,478	+1.03%
1990	5,881	+3.47%
1999	7,724	+3.08%
2007	9,165	+2.16%
2012	10,083	+1.93%
2017	9,816	−0.54%
2023	9,410	−0.70%
Source: INSEE

== See also ==
- Communes of the Martinique department
