= Le François =

- Commune
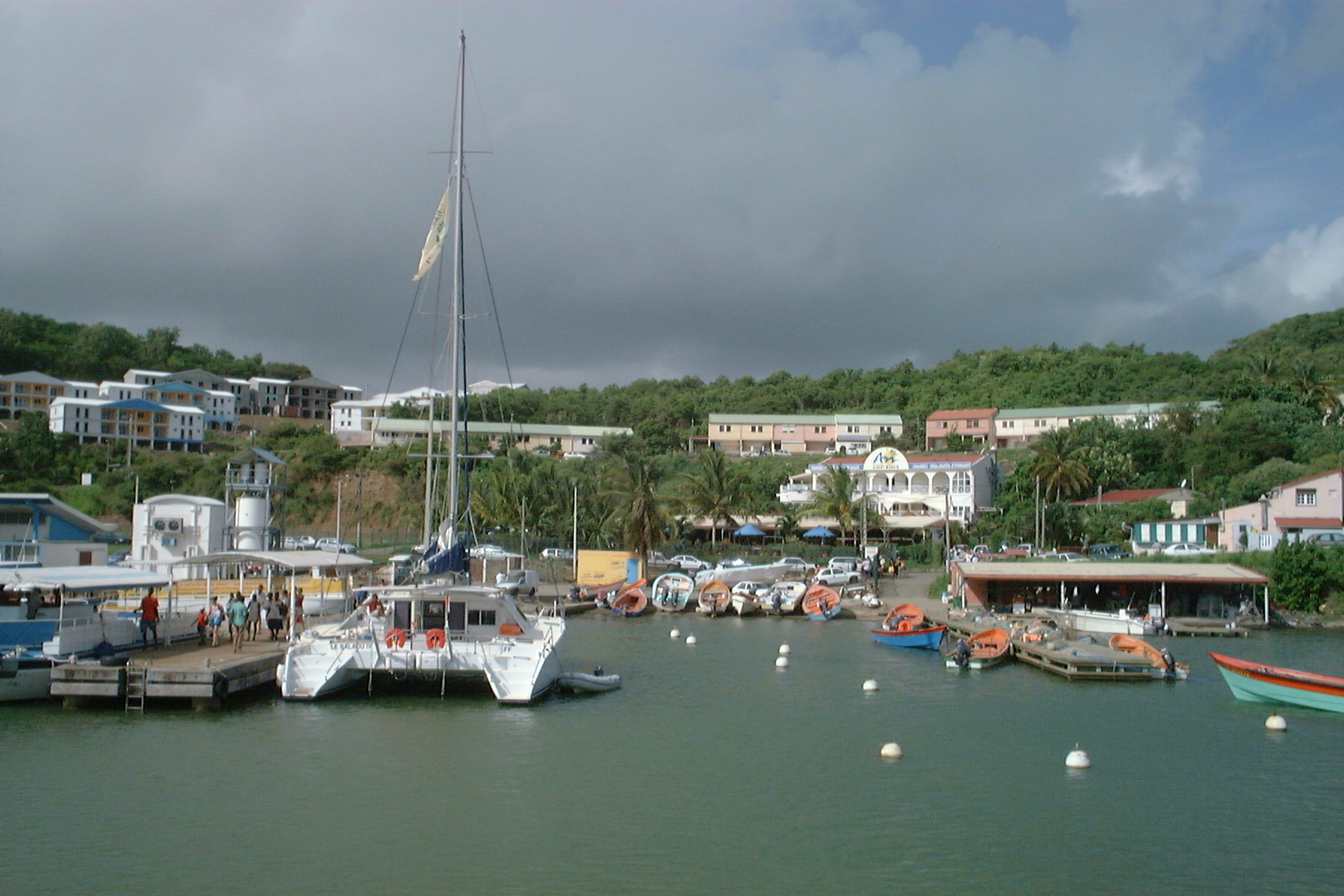
- Le François harbour

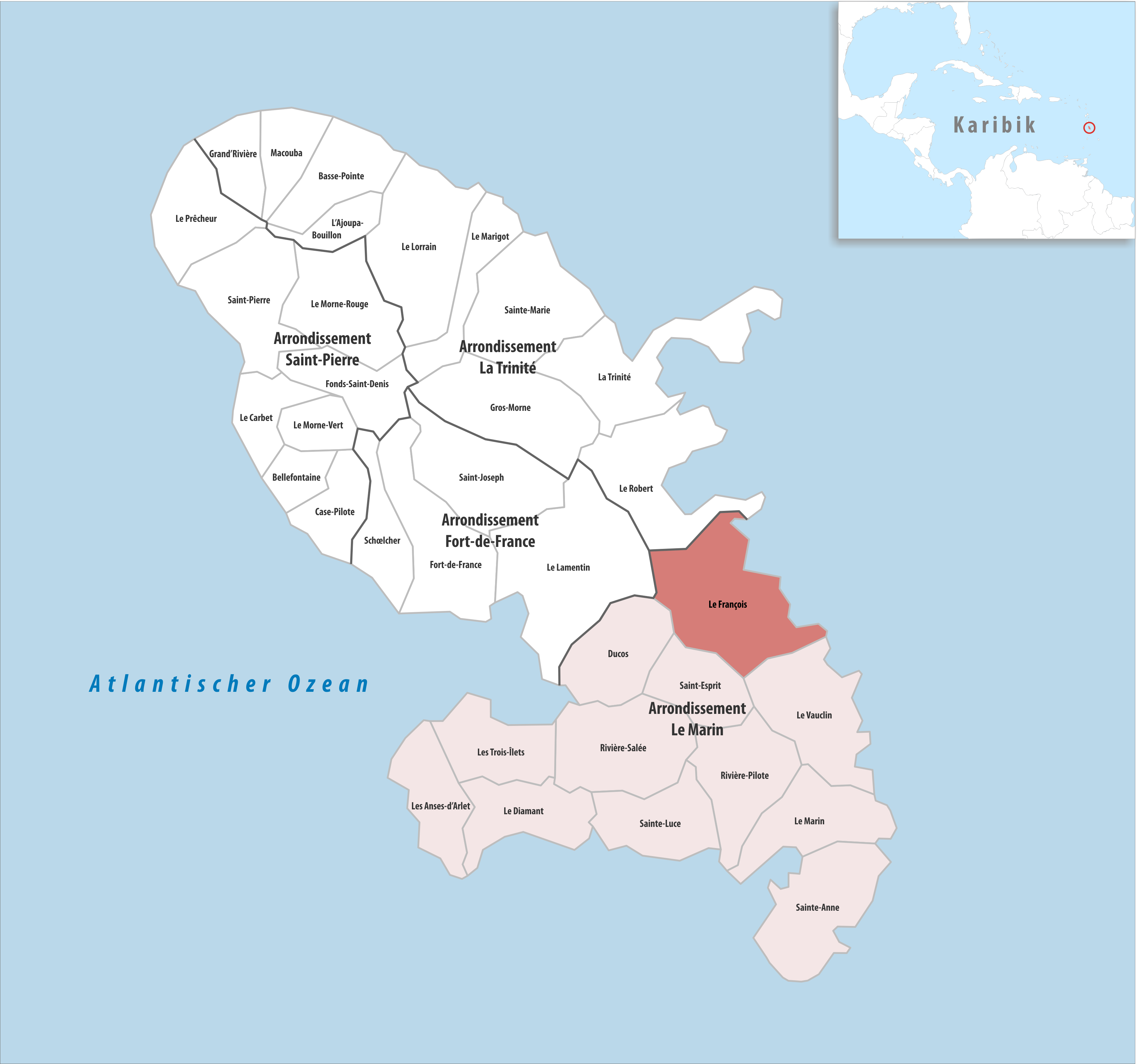
- Location of the commune (in red) within Martinique
- Location of Le François
- Location within France
- Coordinates: 14°36′50″N 60°54′15″W
- Country: France
- Overseas region and department: Martinique
- Arrondissement: Le Marin
- Intercommunality: CA Espace Sud de la Martinique

Government
  - Mayor (2020–2026): Samuel Tavernier
- Area^{1}: 53.93 km^{2} (20.82 sq mi)
- Highest elevation: 363 m (1,191 ft)
- Lowest elevation: 0 m (0 ft)
- Population (2023): 15,778
  - Density: 292.6/km^{2} (757.7/sq mi)
- Time zone: UTC−04:00 (AST)
- INSEE/Postal code: 97210 /97240
- ^{1} French Land Register data, which excludes lakes, ponds, glaciers > 1 km^{2} (0.386 sq mi or 247 acres) and river estuaries.

Le François (French pronunciation: [lə fʁɑ̃swa]; Martinican Creole: Fwanswa) is a town and commune in the arrondissement of Le Marin on Martinique, 22 km (14 mi) from the island capital of Fort-de-France.

== Geography ==
=== Climate ===
Le François has a tropical monsoon climate (Köppen climate classification Am). The average annual temperature in Le François is 27.4 °C (81.3 °F). The average annual rainfall is 1,634.2 mm (64.34 in) with November as the wettest month. The temperatures are highest on average in August, at around 28.2 °C (82.8 °F), and lowest in February, at around 26.3 °C (79.3 °F). The highest temperature ever recorded in Le François was 35.9 °C (96.6 °F) on 18 September 2020; the coldest temperature ever recorded was 16.0 °C (60.8 °F) on 9 February 1976.

Climate data for Le François (1991–2020 averages, extremes 1964−present)
Month	Jan	Feb	Mar	Apr	May	Jun	Jul	Aug	Sep	Oct	Nov	Dec	Year
Record high °C (°F)	32.6 (90.7)	32.7 (90.9)	33.5 (92.3)	34.2 (93.6)	35.4 (95.7)	35.0 (95.0)	33.9 (93.0)	34.7 (94.5)	35.9 (96.6)	34.5 (94.1)	33.5 (92.3)	33.0 (91.4)	35.9 (96.6)
Mean daily maximum °C (°F)	29.7 (85.5)	29.7 (85.5)	30.0 (86.0)	30.5 (86.9)	31.1 (88.0)	31.1 (88.0)	31.2 (88.2)	31.5 (88.7)	31.9 (89.4)	31.5 (88.7)	30.8 (87.4)	30.2 (86.4)	30.8 (87.4)
Daily mean °C (°F)	26.4 (79.5)	26.3 (79.3)	26.6 (79.9)	27.2 (81.0)	27.9 (82.2)	28.0 (82.4)	28.1 (82.6)	28.2 (82.8)	28.2 (82.8)	27.9 (82.2)	27.4 (81.3)	26.9 (80.4)	27.4 (81.3)
Mean daily minimum °C (°F)	23.0 (73.4)	22.8 (73.0)	23.2 (73.8)	23.8 (74.8)	24.7 (76.5)	25.0 (77.0)	25.1 (77.2)	25.0 (77.0)	24.5 (76.1)	24.3 (75.7)	24.0 (75.2)	23.5 (74.3)	24.1 (75.4)
Record low °C (°F)	17.0 (62.6)	16.0 (60.8)	17.0 (62.6)	18.0 (64.4)	19.0 (66.2)	20.0 (68.0)	19.0 (66.2)	20.0 (68.0)	19.0 (66.2)	19.0 (66.2)	18.8 (65.8)	16.5 (61.7)	16.0 (60.8)
Average precipitation mm (inches)	75.1 (2.96)	56.7 (2.23)	52.4 (2.06)	118.2 (4.65)	111.3 (4.38)	132.2 (5.20)	156.2 (6.15)	183.2 (7.21)	182.5 (7.19)	225.5 (8.88)	239.5 (9.43)	101.4 (3.99)	1,634.2 (64.34)
Average precipitation days (≥ 1.0 mm)	13.5	10.4	9.3	9.8	11.3	13.8	17.0	17.0	15.9	16.7	17.1	13.0	164.7
Source: Météo-France

== Population ==
Historical population
Year	Pop.	±% p.a.
1967	15,294	—
1974	15,036	−0.24%
1982	14,383	−0.55%
1990	16,925	+2.06%
1999	18,559	+1.03%
2007	19,333	+0.51%
2012	18,452	−0.93%
2017	16,949	−1.68%
2023	15,778	−1.19%
Source: INSEE

== See also ==
- Communes of the Martinique department
