= Sainte-Anne, Martinique =

Sainte-Anne
- Commune
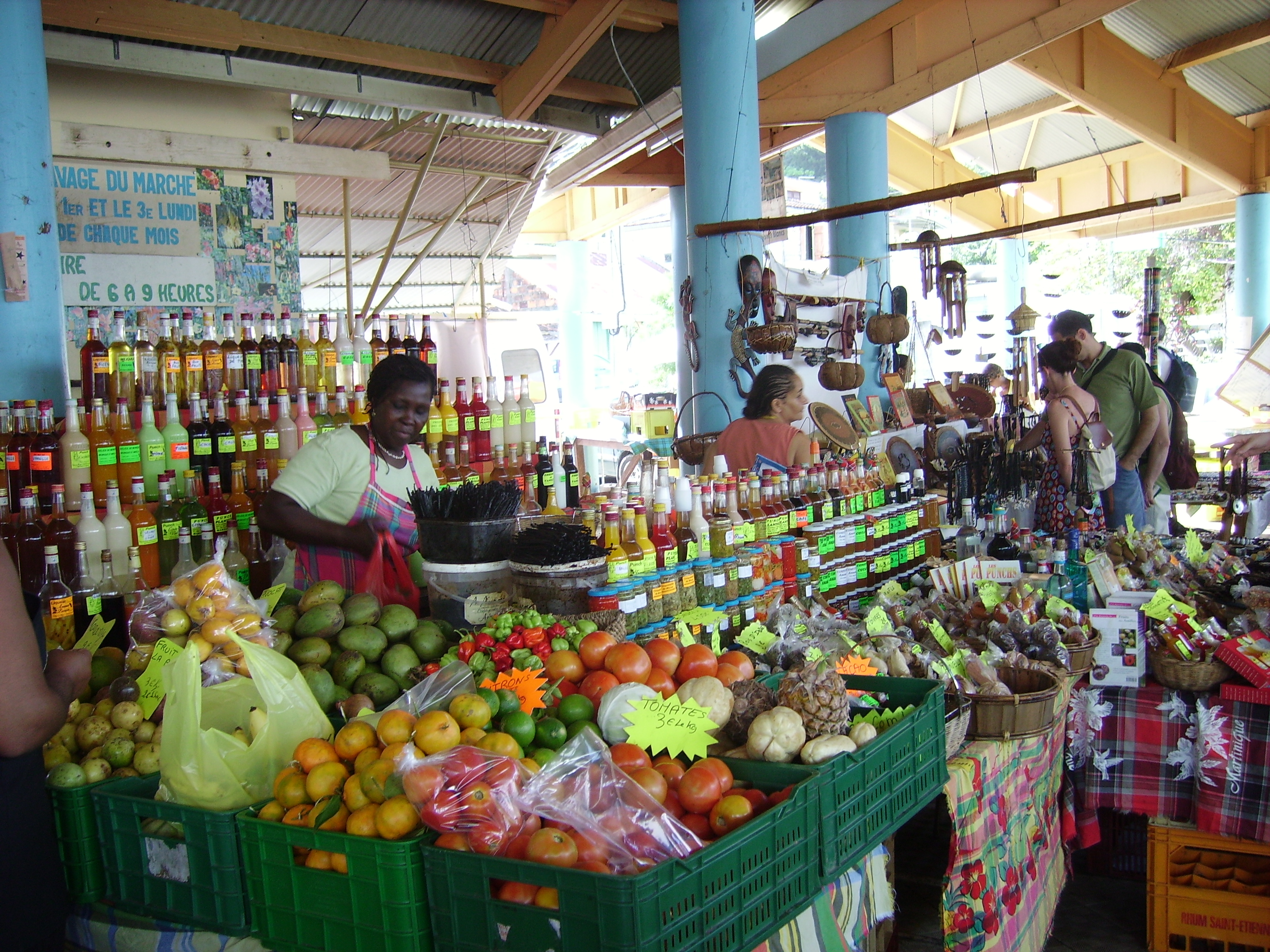
- A view of the market in Sainte-Anne

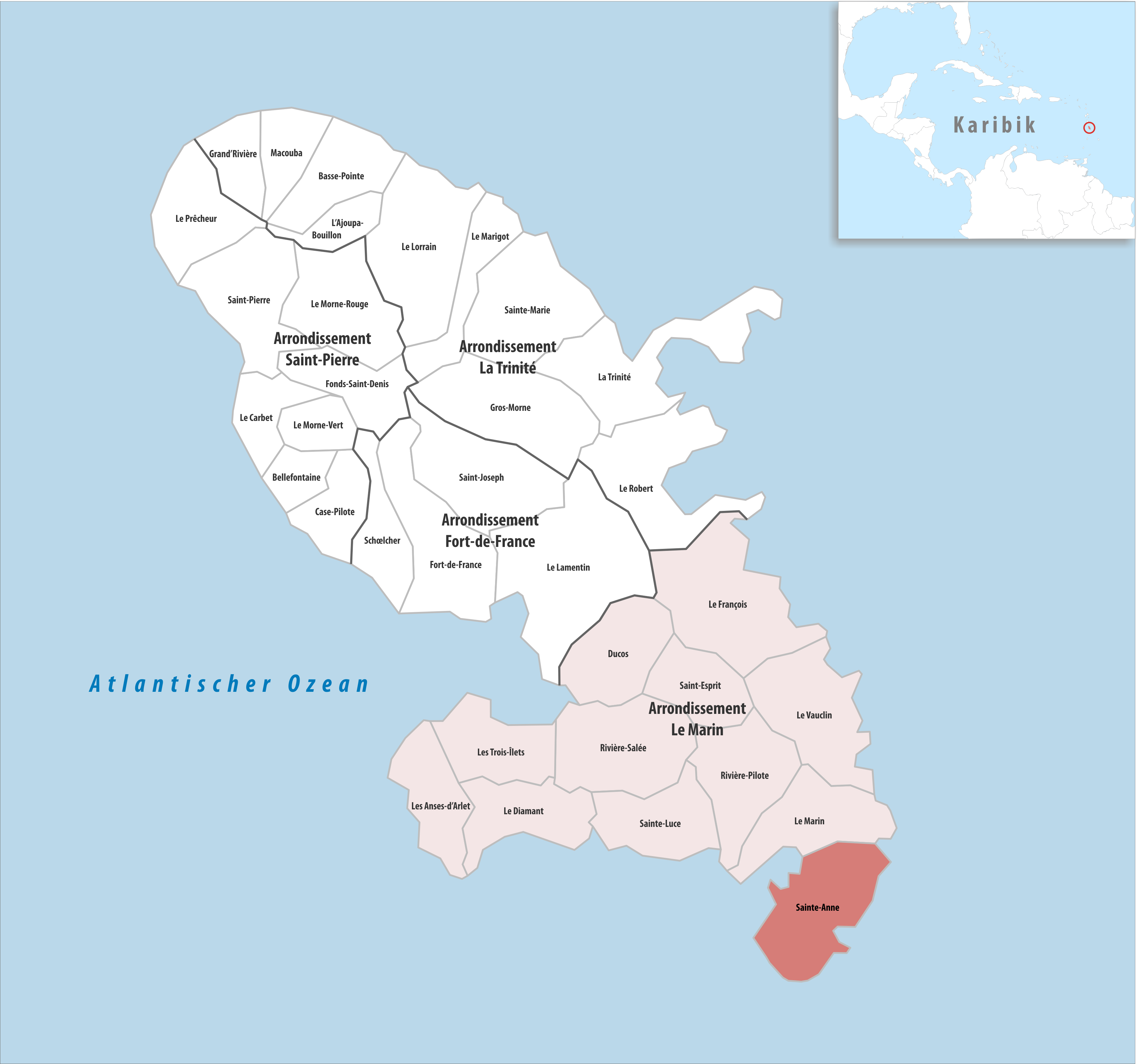
- Location of the commune (in red) within Martinique
- Location of Sainte-Anne
- Location within France
- Coordinates: 14°26′21″N 60°52′44″W
- Country: France
- Overseas region and department: Martinique
- Arrondissement: Le Marin
- Intercommunality: CA Espace Sud de la Martinique

Government
  - Mayor (2020–2026): Jean-Michel Gemieux
- Area^{1}: 38.42 km^{2} (14.83 sq mi)
- Highest elevation: 200 m (660 ft)
- Lowest elevation: 0 m (0 ft)
- Population (2023): 4,306
  - Density: 112.1/km^{2} (290.3/sq mi)
- Time zone: UTC−04:00 (AST)
- INSEE/Postal code: 97226 /97227
- ^{1} French Land Register data, which excludes lakes, ponds, glaciers > 1 km^{2} (0.386 sq mi or 247 acres) and river estuaries.

Sainte-Anne (French pronunciation: [sɛ̃t an]; Martinican Creole: Sentann) is a village and commune in the French overseas department of Martinique.

== Geography ==
=== Climate ===
Sainte-Anne has a tropical monsoon climate (Köppen climate classification Am). The average annual temperature in Sainte-Anne is 26.9 °C (80.4 °F). The average annual rainfall is 1,550.1 mm (61.03 in) with November as the wettest month. The temperatures are highest on average in June, at around 27.6 °C (81.7 °F), and lowest in February, at around 25.6 °C (78.1 °F). The highest temperature ever recorded in Sainte-Anne was 34.0 °C (93.2 °F) on 25 September 2020; the coldest temperature ever recorded was 17.0 °C (62.6 °F) on 25 January 1996.

Climate data for Sainte-Anne (1981–2010 averages, extremes 1993−present)
Month	Jan	Feb	Mar	Apr	May	Jun	Jul	Aug	Sep	Oct	Nov	Dec	Year
Record high °C (°F)	32.4 (90.3)	31.6 (88.9)	31.9 (89.4)	33.9 (93.0)	33.1 (91.6)	32.9 (91.2)	33.7 (92.7)	33.8 (92.8)	34.0 (93.2)	33.9 (93.0)	33.0 (91.4)	32.5 (90.5)	34.0 (93.2)
Mean daily maximum °C (°F)	28.6 (83.5)	28.7 (83.7)	29.3 (84.7)	29.8 (85.6)	30.3 (86.5)	30.3 (86.5)	30.3 (86.5)	30.5 (86.9)	30.7 (87.3)	30.5 (86.9)	29.9 (85.8)	29.2 (84.6)	29.8 (85.6)
Daily mean °C (°F)	25.6 (78.1)	25.6 (78.1)	26.1 (79.0)	26.8 (80.2)	27.5 (81.5)	27.6 (81.7)	27.6 (81.7)	27.6 (81.7)	27.5 (81.5)	27.4 (81.3)	26.8 (80.2)	26.2 (79.2)	26.9 (80.4)
Mean daily minimum °C (°F)	22.7 (72.9)	22.5 (72.5)	22.9 (73.2)	23.8 (74.8)	24.6 (76.3)	25.0 (77.0)	24.8 (76.6)	24.7 (76.5)	24.4 (75.9)	24.2 (75.6)	23.8 (74.8)	23.3 (73.9)	23.9 (75.0)
Record low °C (°F)	17.0 (62.6)	18.8 (65.8)	17.4 (63.3)	19.9 (67.8)	20.6 (69.1)	21.5 (70.7)	20.5 (68.9)	20.8 (69.4)	20.5 (68.9)	20.0 (68.0)	19.5 (67.1)	17.4 (63.3)	17.0 (62.6)
Average precipitation mm (inches)	95.9 (3.78)	59.8 (2.35)	62.1 (2.44)	80.6 (3.17)	108.9 (4.29)	122.8 (4.83)	165.7 (6.52)	195.9 (7.71)	163.7 (6.44)	188.9 (7.44)	198.5 (7.81)	107.3 (4.22)	1,550.1 (61.03)
Average precipitation days (≥ 1.0 mm)	15.1	11.5	10.7	10.6	10.4	14.5	18.7	18.0	15.6	16.5	17.4	14.6	173.7
Source: Meteociel

== Population ==
Historical population
Year	Pop.	±% p.a.
1967	3,120	—
1974	3,001	−0.55%
1982	3,360	+1.42%
1990	3,857	+1.74%
1999	4,131	+0.77%
2007	4,963	+2.32%
2012	4,554	−1.71%
2017	4,298	−1.15%
2023	4,306	+0.03%
Source: INSEE

== Notable residents ==
- Anicia Berton, environmental and social activist

== See also ==
- Communes of the Martinique department
