= Le Marin =

- Subprefecture and commune
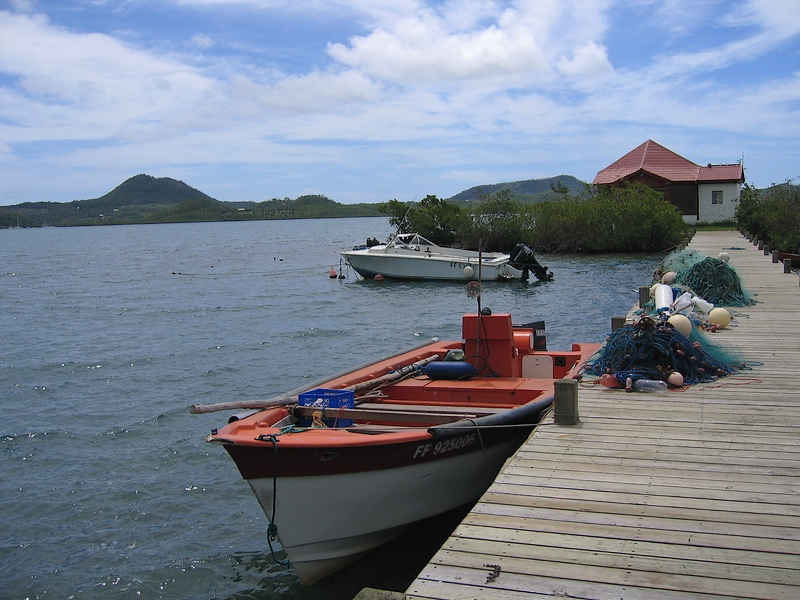
- A view of the jetty at Le Marin

- Coat of arms

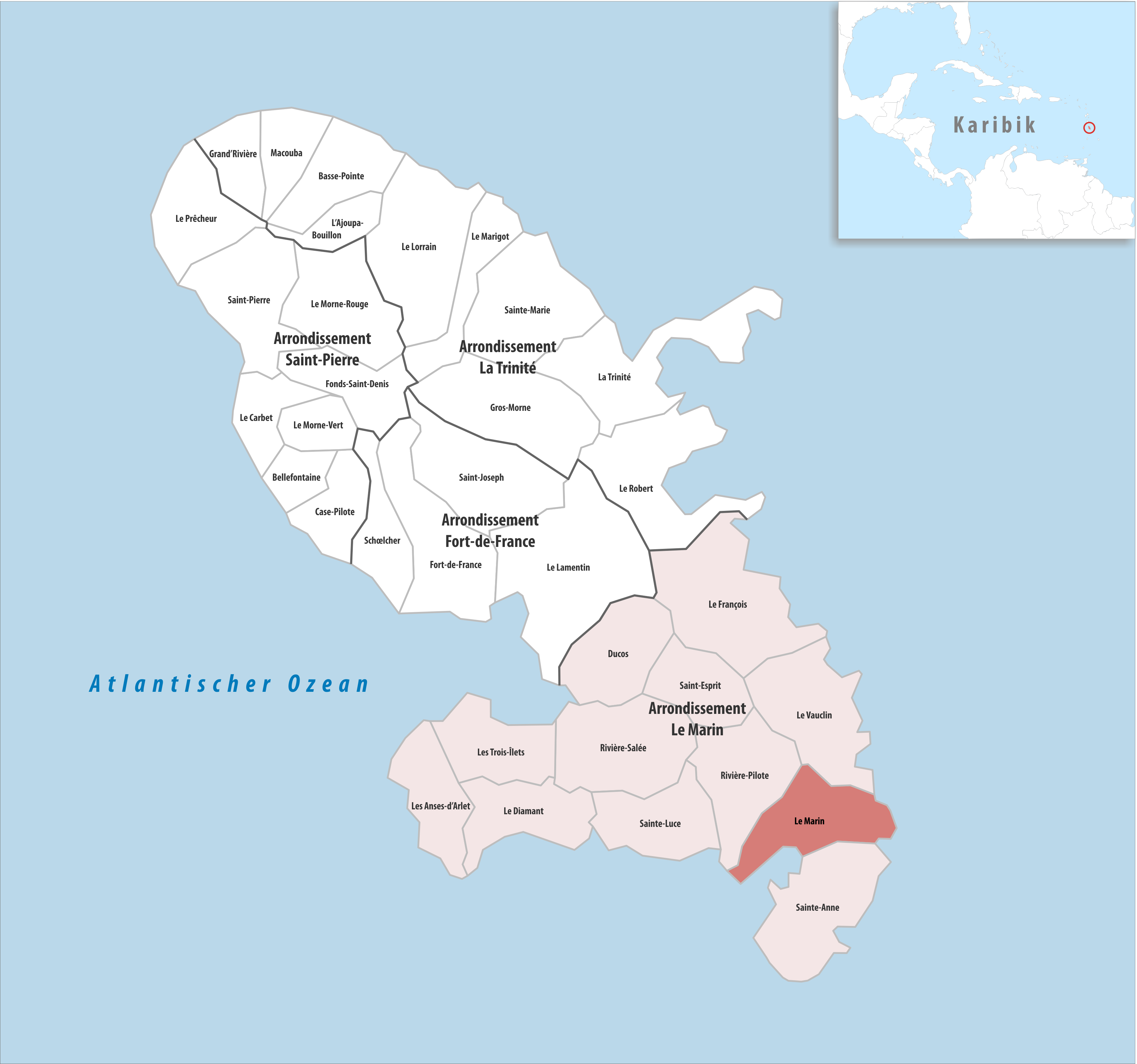
- Location of the commune (in red) within Martinique
- Location of Le Marin
- Coordinates: 14°28′10″N 60°51′57″W
- Country: France
- Overseas region and department: Martinique
- Arrondissement: Le Marin
- Intercommunality: CA Espace Sud de la Martinique

Government
  - Mayor (2020–2026): José Mirande
- Area^{1}: 31.54 km^{2} (12.18 sq mi)
- Highest elevation: 218 m (715 ft)
- Lowest elevation: 0 m (0 ft)
- Population (2023): 8,486
  - Density: 269.1/km^{2} (696.8/sq mi)
- Time zone: UTC−04:00 (AST)
- INSEE/Postal code: 97217 /97290
- ^{1} French Land Register data, which excludes lakes, ponds, glaciers > 1 km^{2} (0.386 sq mi or 247 acres) and river estuaries.

Le Marin (French pronunciation: [lə maʁɛ̃]; Martinican Creole: Maren or Mawen) is a town and commune in the French overseas department of Martinique.

== Population ==
Historical population
Year	Pop.	±% p.a.
1967	6,149	—
1974	6,104	−0.10%
1982	6,066	−0.08%
1990	6,338	+0.55%
1999	7,267	+1.53%
2007	8,769	+2.38%
2012	8,547	−0.51%
2017	8,791	+0.56%
2023	8,486	−0.59%
Source: INSEE

== Points of interest ==
In Le Marin there is Église du Marin, an old church built in 1766. It contains a marble altar and some figurettes worth seeing.

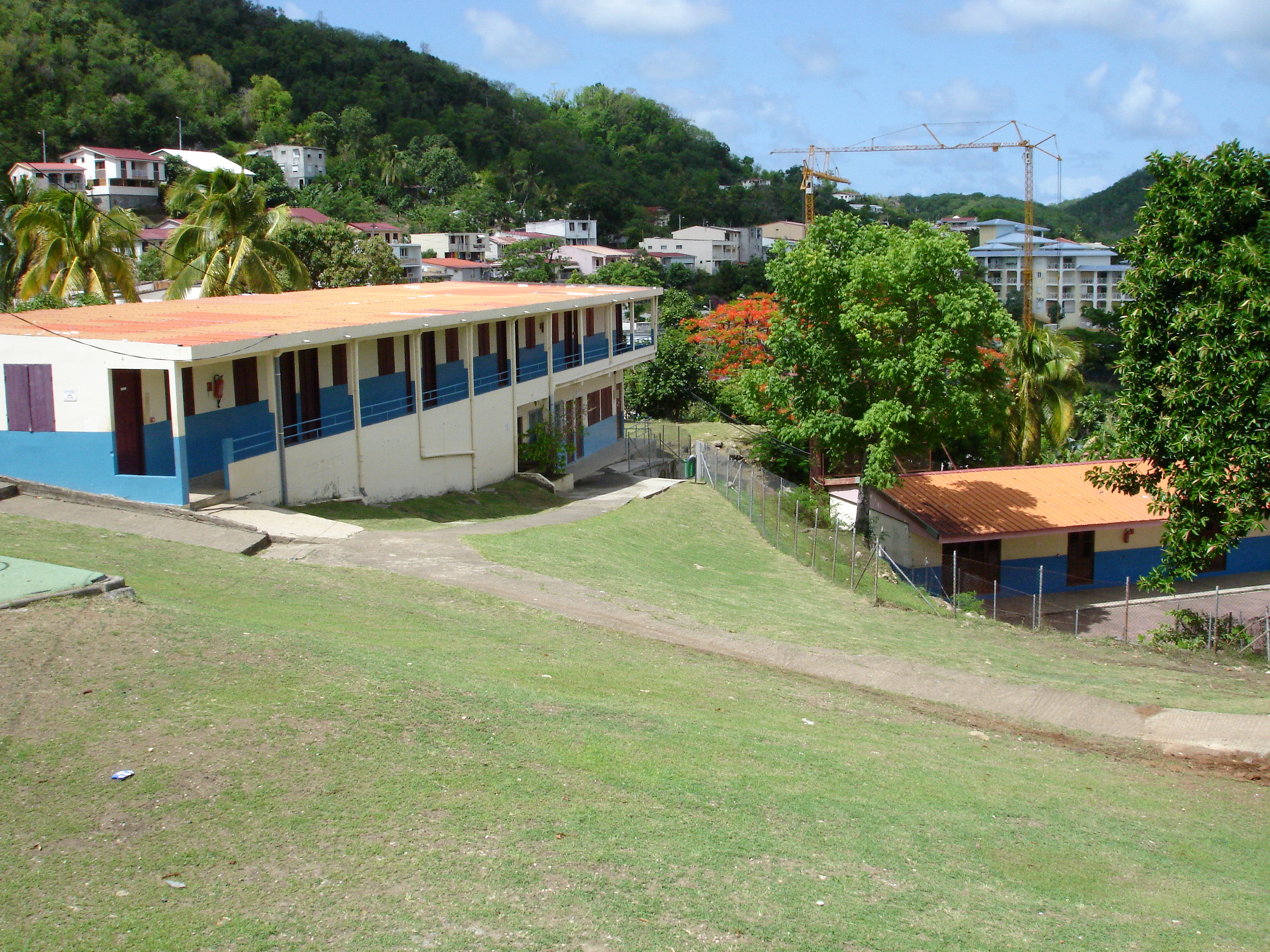
School

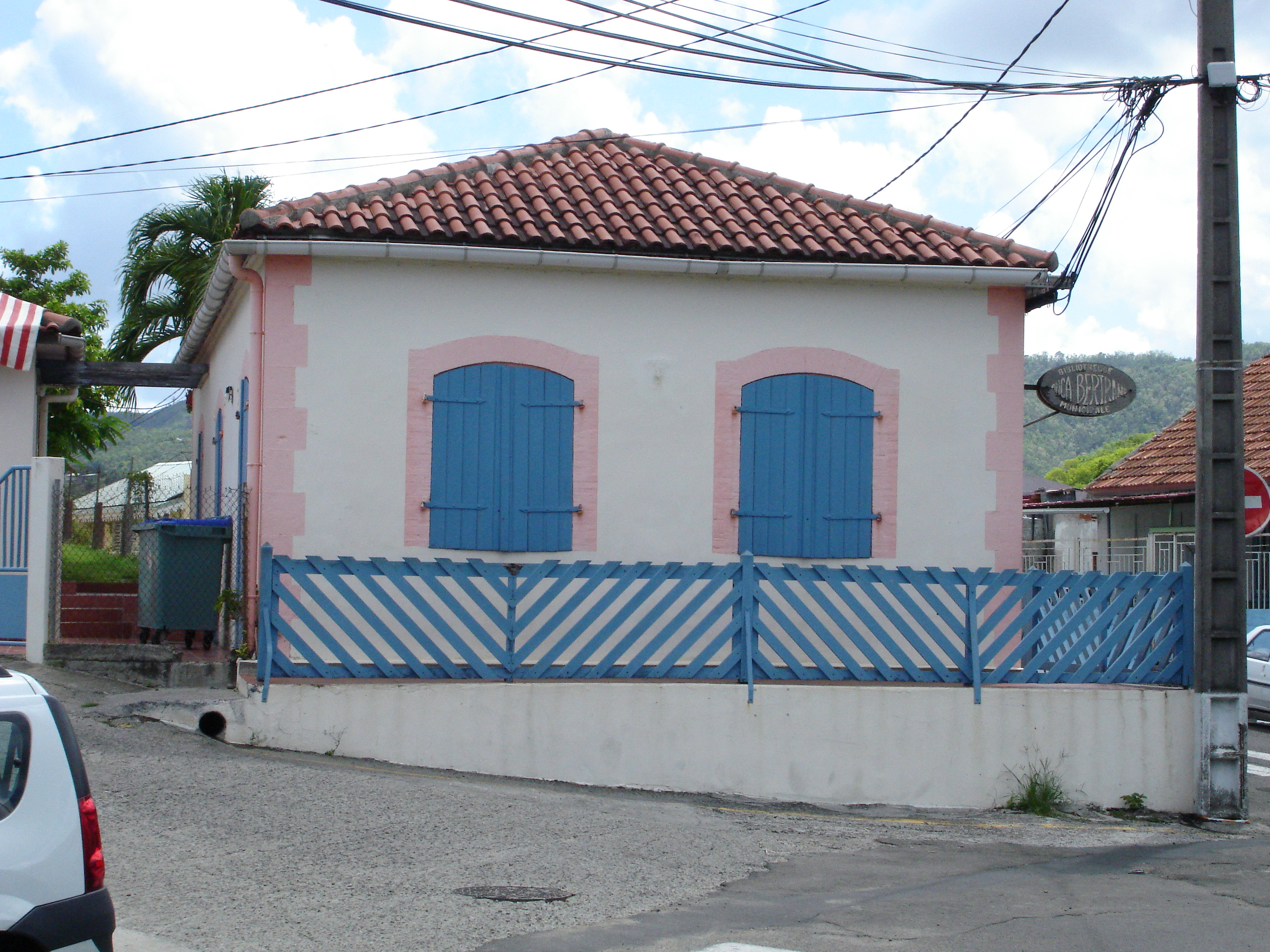
Library

== See also ==
- Communes of Martinique
