= Index of Martinique-related articles =

The location of the French overseas department of Martinique

Articles related to the French overseas department of Martinique include:

== 0–9 ==
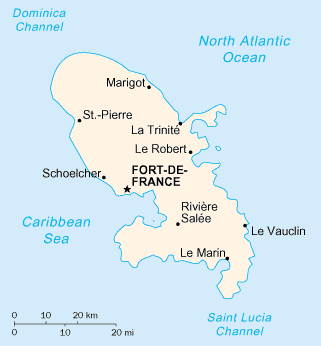
A map of Martinique

- .mq – Internet country code top-level domain for Martinique
- 1891 Martinique hurricane
- 1928 Okeechobee hurricane

== A ==
- A1 autoroute (Martinique)
- Airports in Martinique
- Aimé Césaire
- Alexandre, vicomte de Beauharnais
- Alfred Marie-Jeanne
- Amphicyclotulus liratus
- Americas
  - North America
    - North Atlantic Ocean
      - West Indies
        - Mer des Caraïbes (Caribbean Sea)
          - Antilles
            - Petites Antilles (Lesser Antilles)
              - Islands of Martinique
- Antillean Creole language
- Antillean fruit-eating bat
- Antillean giant rice rat
- Antilles
- Arrondissement of Fort-de-France
- Arrondissement of La Trinité
- Arrondissement of Le Marin
- Arrondissement of Saint-Pierre, Martinique
- Arrondissements of the Martinique department
- Atlas of Martinique

== B ==
- Barbados–France relations
- Basse-Pointe
- Battle of Fort Royal, 1781
- Battle of Martinique (1780)
- Bellefontaine, Martinique
- Bibliography of Martinique
- Biguine
- Bothrops lanceolatus
- British expedition against Martinique
- Build the Martinique Country

== C ==
- Cantons of the Martinique department
  - Canton of Basse-Pointe
  - Canton of Case-Pilote-Bellefontaine
  - Canton of Ducos
  - Canton of Gros-Morne
  - Canton of La Trinité
  - Canton of L'Ajoupa-Bouillon
  - Canton of Le Carbet
  - Canton of Le Diamant
  - Canton of Le Lorrain
  - Canton of Le Marigot
  - Canton of Le Marin
  - Canton of Le Morne-Rouge
  - Canton of Le Prêcheur
  - Canton of Le Vauclin
  - Canton of Les Anses-d'Arlet
  - Canton of Les Trois-Îlets
  - Canton of Macouba
  - Canton of Rivière-Pilote
  - Canton of Rivière-Salée
  - Canton of Sainte-Anne
  - Canton of Sainte-Luce
  - Canton of Saint-Esprit
  - Canton of Saint-Joseph
  - Canton of Saint-Pierre
- Capital of Martinique: Fort-de-France
- Carbet Mountains
- Carib Expulsion
- Caribbean
- Caribbean Carnival
- Caribbean Sea
- Case-Pilote
- Categories:
  - Category:Martinique
    - Category:Buildings and structures in Martinique
    - Category:Communications in Martinique
    - Category:Culture of Martinique
    - Category:Economy of Martinique
    - Category:Environment of Martinique
    - Category:Geography of Martinique
    - Category:History of Martinique
    - Category:Martinique stubs
    - Category:Martinique-related lists
    - Category:People from Martinique
    - Category:Politics of Martinique
    - Category:Society of Martinique
    - Category:Sport in Martinique
    - Category:Transport in Martinique
  - commons:Category:Martinique
- Cave swallow
- Chouval bwa
- Coat of arms of Martinique
- Communes of the Martinique department
- Coralie Balmy
- Créolité
- Culture of Martinique

== D ==
- Demographics of Martinique
- Diamond Rock
- Ducos

== E ==
- Eastern Caribbean Gas Pipeline Company Limited
- Economy of Martinique
- Édouard Glissant
- Elections in Martinique
- Euro

== F ==
The Flag of France

- Fabrice Jeannet
- Flag of France
- Flag of Martinique
- Fonds-Saint-Denis
- Football in Martinique
- Fort Desaix
- Fort Saint Louis (Martinique)
- Fort-de-France – Capital of Martinique
- Fort-de-France 1st Canton
- Fort-de-France 2nd Canton
- Fort-de-France 3rd Canton
- Fort-de-France 4th Canton
- Fort-de-France 5th Canton
- Fort-de-France 6th Canton
- Fort-de-France 7th Canton
- Fort-de-France 8th Canton
- Fort-de-France 9th Canton
- Fort-de-France 10th Canton
- Fort-de-France Bay
- Fort-de-France Cathedral
- France
- Frantz Fanon
- French America
- French colonization of the Americas
- French language
- French overseas department of Martinique (Région Martinique)
- French Republic (République française)
- French West Indies

== G ==
- Geography of Martinique
- Giant ditch frog
- Grand'Rivière
- Great Hurricane of 1780
- Gros-Morne, Martinique

== H ==
- Havivra Da Ifrile
- Hinduism in Martinique
- History of Martinique
- Hurricane Dean
- Hurricane Klaus (1990)

== I ==
- International Organization for Standardization (ISO)
  - ISO 3166-1 alpha-2 country code for Martinique: MQ
  - ISO 3166-1 alpha-3 country code for Martinique: MTQ
- Islands of Martinique:
  - Martinique
  - Bats Island
  - Bonchard
  - Cay Pinsonelle
  - Diamond Rock
  - Dupre Island
  - Gros Ilet
  - Grotte Rock
  - Ile Chancel
  - Ile Petite Grenade
  - Ilet A Eau
  - Ilet A Ramiers
  - Ilet A Tois Roux
  - Ilet Au Rat
  - Ilet Aubin
  - Ilet Baude
  - Ilet Boisseau
  - Ilet Cabrits
  - Ilet Chevalier
  - Ilet De La Rose
  - Ilet Des Chardons
  - Ilet Du Galion
  - Ilet Duchamp
  - Ilet Duquesnay
  - Ilet Fregate
  - Ilet Hardy
  - Ilet La Perle
  - Ilet Lapin
  - Ilet Lavigne
  - Ilet Lezard
  - Ilet Long
  - Ilet Madame
  - Ilet Metrente
  - Ilet Oscar
  - Ilet Pele
  - Ilet Petit Piton
  - Ilet Petit Vincent
  - Ilet Petite Martinique
  - Ilet Ragot
  - Ilet Ramville
  - Ilet Sainte-Marie
  - Ilet Tartane
  - Ilet Thiery
  - Ilets Aux Chiens
  - Les Trois Ilets
  - Petit Ilet Duprey
  - Petit Ilet
  - Sugarloaf Rock
  - Table Au Diable
  - Trou Terre Island

== J ==
- Jean-Baptiste Labat
- Jean-Michel Sigere
- Jérôme Jeannet
- Joël Abati
- Joséphine de Beauharnais

== K ==
- Kadans

== L ==
- La Savane (Martinique)
- La Trinité, Martinique
- L'Ajoupa-Bouillon
- Le Carbet
- Le Diamant
- Le François 1st Canton Nord
- Le François 2nd Canton Sud
- Le François
- Le Lamentin 1st Canton Sud-Bourg
- Le Lamentin 2nd Canton Nord
- Le Lamentin 3rd Canton Est
- Le Lamentin
- Le Lorrain
- Le Marigot
- Le Marin
- Le Morne-Rouge
- Le Morne-Vert
- Le Prêcheur
- Le Robert 1st Canton Sud
- Le Robert 2nd Canton Nord
- Le Robert
- Le Tour de Yoles Rondes de Martinique
- Le Vauclin
- Léon Compère-Léandre
- Les Anses-d'Arlet
- Les Trois-Îlets
- Lesser Antilles
- Lewoz
- Ligue de football de la Martinique
- Liophis cursor
- Lists related to Martinique:
  - List of airports in Martinique
  - List of extinct animals of Martinique and Guadeloupe
  - List of islands of Martinique
  - List of mammals in Martinique
  - List of Martinique films
  - List of Martinique-related topics
  - List of political parties in Martinique
  - List of rivers of Martinique
  - List of volcanoes in Martinique
- Ludger Sylbaris
- Lydie Denier

== M ==
- Macouba
- Majestik Zouk
- Mammals of Martinique
- Manuela Ramin-Osmundsen
- Martinican, adjective or noun
- Martinican Communist Party
- Martinican Independence Movement
- Martinican Progressive Party
- Martinique's 1st constituency, French National Assembly
- Martinique's 2nd constituency
- Martinique's 3rd constituency
- Martinique's 4th constituency
- Martiniquais, noun or adjective
- Martinique (Région Martinique)
- Martinique Aimé Césaire International Airport
- Martinique films
- Martinique franc
- Martinique national football team
- Martinique national rugby union team
- Martinique oriole
- Martinique Passage
- Mer des Caraïbes
- Mount Pelée
- Music of Martinique

== N ==
- Nadia Chonville
- North America
- North Atlantic Ocean
- Northern Hemisphere

== P ==
- Petites Antilles
- Pierre Belain d'Esnambuc
- Pine warbler
- Political parties in Martinique
- Politics of Martinique

== R ==
- Région Martinique (Martinique)
- République française (French Republic)
- Rivers of Martinique
- Rivière-Pilote
- Rivière-Salée
- Roman Catholic Archdiocese of Fort-de-France

== S ==
- Saint Lucia Channel
- Sainte-Anne, Martinique
- Sainte-Luce, Martinique
- Sainte-Marie 1st Canton Nord
- Sainte-Marie 2nd Canton Sud
- Sainte-Marie, Martinique
- Saint-Esprit
- Saint-Joseph, Martinique
- Saint-Pierre, Martinique
- Schœlcher 1st Canton
- Schœlcher 2nd Canton
- Schœlcher
- Scouting in Martinique
- Serge Larcher
- Suzanne Césaire

== T ==
- Take Air
- Thierry Henry
- Transport in Martinique
- Tropical Storm Dorothy (1970)

== V ==
- Vanessa Beauchaints
- Volcanoes of Martinique

== W ==
- West Indies
- Western Hemisphere
- Wikimedia Atlas of Martinique

== Z ==
- Zouk

== See also ==
- List of Caribbean-related topics
- List of international rankings
- Lists of country-related topics
- Topic outline of geography
- Topic outline of North America
