= Cantons of the Martinique department =

The following is a list of the 45 former cantons of the Martinique department, an overseas department of France, sorted by arrondissement. The cantons were abolished in 2015, when the Assembly of Martinique replaced the General Council of Martinique and the Regional Council of Martinique.

== Arrondissement of Fort-de-France (16 cantons) ==
- Fort-de-France 1st Canton
- Fort-de-France 2nd Canton
- Fort-de-France 3rd Canton
- Fort-de-France 4th Canton
- Fort-de-France 5th Canton
- Fort-de-France 6th Canton
- Fort-de-France 7th Canton
- Fort-de-France 8th Canton
- Fort-de-France 9th Canton
- Fort-de-France 10th Canton
- Le Lamentin 1st Canton Sud-Bourg
- Le Lamentin 2nd Canton Nord
- Le Lamentin 3rd Canton Est
- Saint-Joseph
- Schœlcher 1st Canton
- Schœlcher 2nd Canton

== Arrondissement of La Trinité (11 cantons) ==
- L'Ajoupa-Bouillon
- Basse-Pointe
- Gros-Morne
- Le Lorrain
- Macouba
- Le Marigot
- Le Robert 1st Canton Sud
- Le Robert 2nd Canton Nord
- Sainte-Marie 1st Canton Nord
- Sainte-Marie 2nd Canton Sud
- La Trinité

== Arrondissement of Le Marin (13 cantons) ==
- Les Anses-d'Arlet
- Le Diamant
- Ducos
- Le François 1st Canton Nord
- Le François 2nd Canton Sud
- Le Marin
- Rivière-Pilote
- Rivière-Salée
- Sainte-Anne
- Sainte-Luce
- Saint-Esprit
- Les Trois-Îlets
- Le Vauclin

== Arrondissement of Saint-Pierre (5 cantons) ==
- Le Carbet
- Case-Pilote-Bellefontaine
- Le Morne-Rouge
- Le Prêcheur
- Saint-Pierre
