= Arrondissements of the Martinique department =

Administrative divisions of Martinique, France

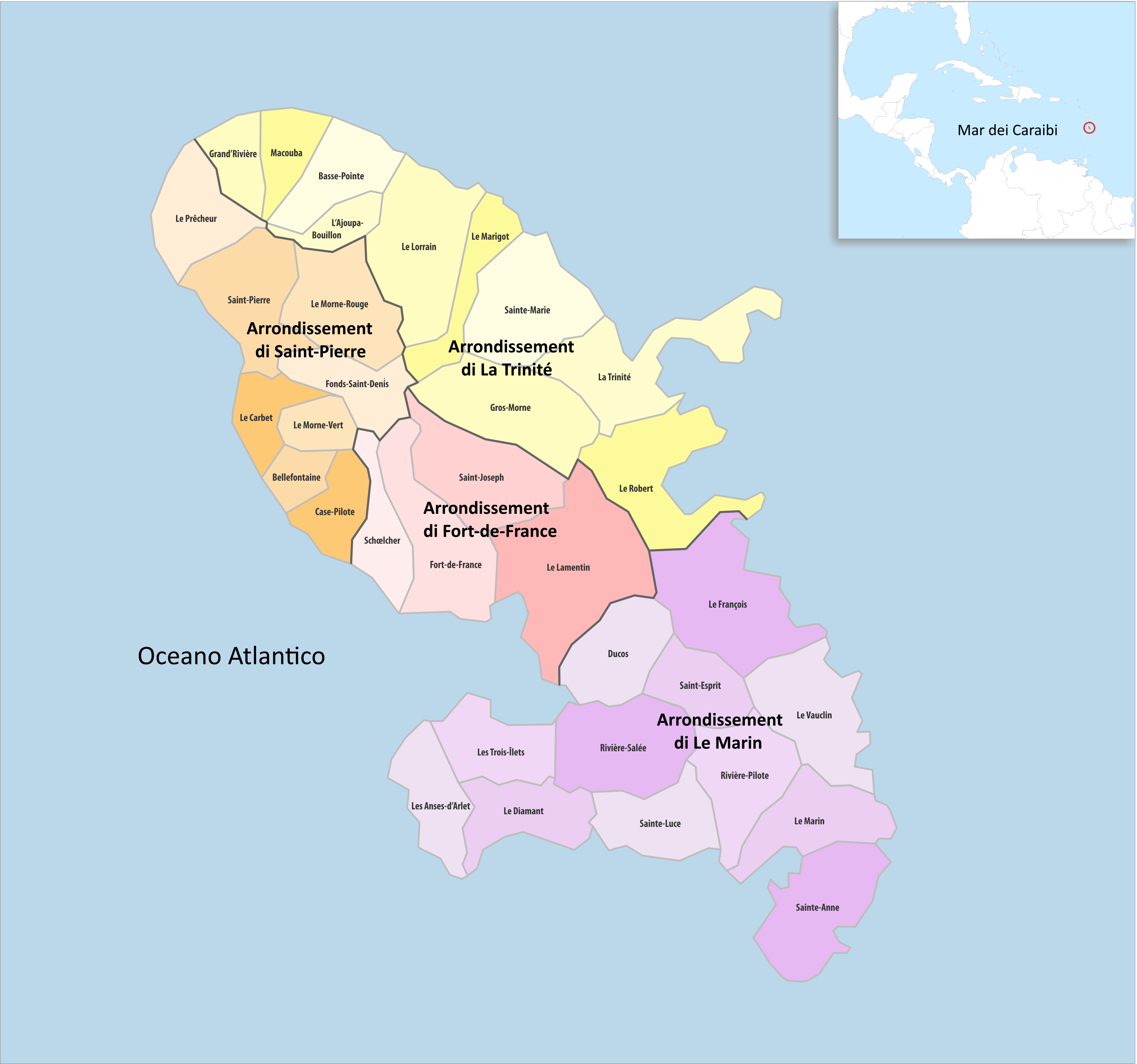
Map of the arrondissements of Martinique.

The 4 arrondissements of the Martinique department are:

1. Arrondissement of Fort-de-France, (prefecture of the Martinique department: Fort-de-France) with 4 communes. The population of the arrondissement was 150,038 in 2021.
2. Arrondissement of Le Marin, (subprefecture: Le Marin) with 12 communes. The population of the arrondissement was 115,068 in 2021.
3. Arrondissement of Saint-Pierre, (subprefecture: Saint-Pierre) with 8 communes. The population of the arrondissement was 22,352 in 2021.
4. Arrondissement of La Trinité, (subprefecture: La Trinité) with 10 communes. The population of the arrondissement was 73,291 in 2021.

== History ==
At the creation of the department of Martinique in 1947, its only arrondissement was Fort-de-France. The arrondissement of La Trinité, containing 10 communes that were previously part of the arrondissement of Fort-de-France, was created in 1965. The arrondissement of Le Marin, containing 12 communes that were previously part of the arrondissement of Fort-de-France, was created in 1974. The arrondissement of Saint-Pierre, containing eight communes that were previously part of the arrondissement of Fort-de-France, was created in 1995.

== See also ==
- Cantons of the Martinique department
- Communes of the Martinique department
