= Édouard de Lépine =

French politician (1932–2020)

Mayor of Le Robert
- In office 1989–1995

Personal details
- Born: 11 January 1932 Fort-de-France, Martinique
- Died: 11 August 2020 (aged 88) Le Robert, Martinique
- Party: PCF; MCF; PPM
- Occupation: Historian; Politician

Édouard de Lépine (11 January 1932 – 11 August 2020) was a Martinican historian and politician.

== Biography ==
A former student at the Lycée Victor-Schœlcher in Fort-de-France, de Lépine returned to the school as an adult to be a history and geography teacher. He also taught at the University of the Antilles and Guyana.

De Lépine was a member of the French Communist Party and the Martinican Communist Party from 1945 to 1971. In 1971, he became excluded from the communist parties for his independent views. He then met Aimé Césaire, Édouard Glissant, Georges Lafare, Marcel Manvilles, and Frantz Fanon, with whom he became friends. In 1972, he was a founding member of the Groupe révolution socialiste, a local sector of the Fourth International. He joined the Martinican Progressive Party in 1982. He served as Mayor of Le Robert from 1989 to 1995.

In addition to his political career, de Lépine wrote a series of essays on Martinique's history and was outspoken against Martinican separatists. He wrote an essay against them, titled Sur la Question dite du Statut de la Martinique. His final essay was about Aimé Césaire, titled Nous sommes des nains sur les épaules d’un géant and published in 2017.

Édouard de Lépine died in Le Robert on 11 August 2020 at the age of 88.

== Bibliography ==
- Pour la révolution socialiste antillaise: contribution au débat (1973)
- Questions sur l'histoire antillaise : trois essais sur l'abolition, l'assimilation, l'autonomie (1978)
- La Crise de février 1935 à la Martinique : la marche de la faim sur Fort-de-France (1980)
- Dix semaines qui ébranlèrent la Martinique : 25 mars – 4 juin 1848 (1999)
- Hommage à un grand martiniquais, Camille Darsières (2009)
- Sur la Question dite du Statut de la Martinique (2009)
- Nous sommes des nains sur les épaules d'un géant, Aimé Césaire (2017)
