= Communauté d'agglomération du Centre de la Martinique =

Coordinates: 14.61°N 61.07°W

Centre de la Martinique
- Communauté d'agglomération
- Location within Martinique
- Country: France
- Overseas region and department: Martinique{{{region}}}
- No. of communes: {{{nbcomm}}}
- Established: 2001
- Area: 171.0 km^{2} (66.0 sq mi)
- Population (2018): 154,706
  - Density: 904.7/km^{2} (2,343/sq mi)

Communauté d'agglomération du Centre de la Martinique is the communauté d'agglomération, an intercommunal structure, centred on the city of Fort-de-France. It is located in Martinique, an overseas department and region of France. It was created in January 2001. Its area is 171.0 km^{2}. Its population was 154,706 in 2018, of which 78,126 in Fort-de-France proper.

== Composition ==
The communauté d'agglomération consists of the following 4 communes:

1. Fort-de-France
2. Le Lamentin
3. Saint-Joseph
4. Schœlcher
