= Canton of Macouba =

Coordinates: 14.8761°N 61.1403°W

The Canton of Macouba is a former canton in the Arrondissement of La Trinité on Martinique. It had 1,650 inhabitants (2012). It was disbanded in 2015. The canton comprised the communes of Macouba and Grand'Rivière.
