= Ilet Boisseau =

- Interactive map of Ilet Boisseau

Geography
- Coordinates: 14°40′27.66″N 60°52′50.48″W
- Adjacent to: Atlantic Ocean
- Area: 0.054 km^{2} (0.021 sq mi)
- Regions of France: Martinique
- France

Additional information
- Time zone: ECT (UTC-4)

Ilet Boisseau, or Bushel Island, is an island located near Martinique, as part of the Arrondissement of La Trinité. The island is small, with a total area of 0.054 km^{2}. Ilet Boisseau is a protected area.
