= Hôtel de Ville, Le Robert =

Town hall in Le Robert, France

Hôtel de Ville
- The main frontage of the Hôtel de Ville in January 2011
- Interactive map of the Hôtel de Ville area

General information
- Type: City hall
- Architectural style: Art Deco style
- Location: Le Robert, Martinique
- Coordinates: 14.6776°N 60.9392°W
- Completed: 1933

The Hôtel de Ville (French pronunciation: [otɛl də vil], City Hall) is a municipal building in Le Robert, Martinique, in the Caribbean Sea, standing on Rue Vincent Allègre.

== History ==
After the commune of Le Robert was established in 1837, the new town council led by the mayor, Louis Louveau-de-Laguigneraye, decided to commission a town hall. The site they selected was in the heart of the old town facing the market square and located just to the north of the Church of Sainte-Rose-de-Lima which had been rebuilt in 1824. It was designed in the traditional style, built of wood and was probably completed in the mid-19th century.

A particularly strong hurricane made landfall in the communes of La Trinité and Le Robert at 6pm in the evening of 18 August 1891 and it is likely that the old wooden town hall would have been badly damaged at that time.

In the early 1930s, the council led by the mayor, Lucien Belus, decided to demolish the old town hall and build a more substantial municipal building on the same site. The new building was designed in the Art Deco style, built of brick with a cement render finish and bright colouring, reminiscent of other West Indian buildings of the era, and was completed in 1933.

The design involved a symmetrical main frontage of three bays facing the market square. The main frontage featured a series of basket-handle shaped openings on both floors. The central opening contained the main entrance while the other five openings contained casement windows. There was a veranda at the front of the building on the ground floor along with four posts which supported a full width balustraded balcony on the first floor. The bays on the first floor were separated by pilasters supporting a cornice and a central clock which was flanked by a pair of dormer windows. Internally, the principal room was the Salle du Conseil (council chamber).
