= Communauté d'agglomération du Pays Nord Martinique =

Pays Nord Martinique
- Communauté d'agglomération
- Interactive map of Pays Nord Martinique
- Coordinates: 14°48′N 61°05′W
- Country: France
- Overseas region and department: Martinique{{{region}}}
- No. of communes: {{{nbcomm}}}
- Established: 2014
- Area: 547.9 km^{2} (211.5 sq mi)
- Population (2017): 100,347
  - Density: 183.1/km^{2} (474.4/sq mi)

Communauté d'agglomération du Pays Nord Martinique (pronounced [kɔmynɔte daɡlɔmeʁasjɔ̃ dy pei nɔʁ maʁtinik]; often as CAP Nord Martinique) is an intercommunal structure in the French overseas department and region of Martinique. It was created in January 2014. Its seat is in Le Marigot. Its area is 547.9 km^{2}. Its population was 100,347 in 2017.

== Composition ==
The communauté d'agglomération consists of the following 18 communes:

1. L'Ajoupa-Bouillon
2. Basse-Pointe
3. Bellefontaine
4. Le Carbet
5. Case-Pilote
6. Fonds-Saint-Denis
7. Grand'Rivière
8. Gros-Morne
9. Le Lorrain
10. Macouba
11. Le Marigot
12. Le Morne-Rouge
13. Le Morne-Vert
14. Le Prêcheur
15. Le Robert
16. Sainte-Marie
17. Saint-Pierre
18. La Trinité
