= Pointe Hyacinthe =

Coordinates: 14.665°N 60.905°W

Pointe Hyacinthe is a village and a headland in the commune of Le Robert on the east coast of Martinique.
