= Le Lamentin 1st Canton Sud-Bourg =

Coordinates: 14.6010°N 60.9990°W

Le Lamentin 1st Canton Sud-Bourg is a former canton in the arrondissement of Fort-de-France on Martinique. It had 7,991 inhabitants (2012). It was disbanded in 2015. The canton comprised part of the commune of Le Lamentin.
