= Le Robert 2nd Canton Nord =

Coordinates: 14.6779°N 60.9393°W

Le Robert 2nd Canton Nord is a former canton in the Arrondissement of La Trinité on Martinique. It had 14,774 inhabitants (2012). It was disbanded in 2015. The canton comprised part of the commune of Le Robert.
