= Arrondissement of Fort-de-France =

Coordinates: 14°36′28″N 61°04′19″W

Fort-de-France
- Arrondissement
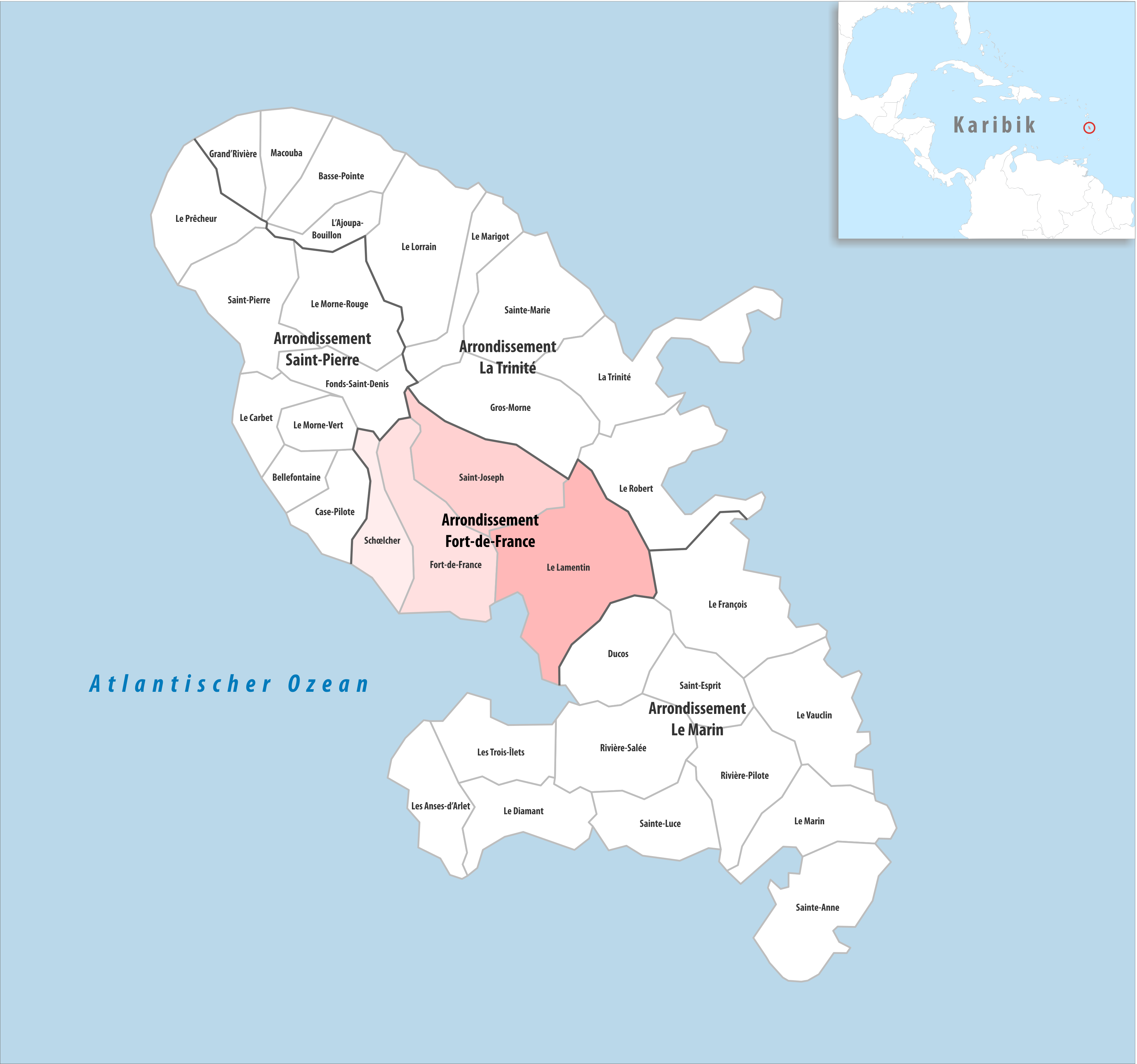
- Location within the region Martinique
- Country: France
- Overseas region and department: Martinique{{{region}}}
- No. of communes: {{{nbcomm}}}
- Area: 171.0 km^{2} (66.0 sq mi)
- Population (2023): 150,642
  - Density: 880.9/km^{2} (2,282/sq mi)
- INSEE code: 9721

The arrondissement of Fort-de-France (French: arrondissement de Fort-de-France) is an arrondissement in the French overseas region and department of Martinique. It has four communes. Its population is 150,038 (2021), and its area is 171.0 km^{2} (66.0 sq mi).

== Composition ==
The communes of the arrondissement of Fort-de-France, and their INSEE codes, are:

1. Fort-de-France (97209)
2. Le Lamentin (97213)
3. Saint-Joseph (97224)
4. Schœlcher (97229)

== History ==
At the creation of the department of Martinique in 1947, its only arrondissement was Fort-de-France. It lost 10 communes to the new arrondissement of La Trinité in 1965, 12 communes to the new arrondissement of Le Marin in 1974, and eight communes to the new arrondissement of Saint-Pierre in 1995.

Before 2015, the arrondissements of Martinique were subdivided into cantons. The cantons of the arrondissement of Fort-de-France were, as of January 2015:

1. Fort-de-France 1st Canton
2. Fort-de-France 2nd Canton
3. Fort-de-France 3rd Canton
4. Fort-de-France 4th Canton
5. Fort-de-France 5th Canton
6. Fort-de-France 6th Canton
7. Fort-de-France 7th Canton
8. Fort-de-France 8th Canton
9. Fort-de-France 9th Canton
10. Fort-de-France 10th Canton
11. Le Lamentin 1st Canton Sud-Bourg
12. Le Lamentin 2nd Canton Nord
13. Le Lamentin 3rd Canton Est
14. Saint-Joseph
15. Schœlcher 1st Canton
16. Schœlcher 2nd Canton
