= Canton of Saint-Joseph =

Coordinates: 14.6742°N 61.0378°W

The Canton of Saint-Joseph is a former canton in the Arrondissement of Fort-de-France on Martinique. It had 16,648 inhabitants (2012). It was disbanded in 2015. The canton comprised the commune of Saint-Joseph.
