= List of political parties in Martinique =

Martinique is not a separate territory but a region of France. France has a multi-party system, with numerous parties in which no one party often has a chance of gaining power alone, and parties must work with each other to form coalition governments.

For further details see the article: Politics of France.

== The parties ==
Most of the French political parties are active in Martinique.

In addition there are a number of regional parties:

- Martinican Independence Movement (Mouvement Indépendantiste Martiniquais, MIM)
- Martinican Progressive Party (Parti Progressiste Martiniquais, PPM)
- Build the Martinique Country (Batir le Pays Martinique)
- Martinican Communist Party (Parti Communiste Martiniquais, PCM) close to PCF
- Péyi-A, affiliated with NUPES

=== Local factions of French parties ===
- Socialist Federation of Martinique (Fédération socialiste de Martinique, FSM) close to PS
- Worker's Combat (Combat Ouvrier, CO) close to Workers' Struggle

== See also ==
- Lists of political parties
