= Serge Larcher =

French politician (born 1945)

Serge Larcher (born 17 October 1945) was a member of the Senate of France from 2004 to 2017, representing the island of Martinique. He is a member of the Socialist Party.
