= Sainte-Marie 1st Canton Nord =

Former canton in Martinique (disbanded 2015)

- Former canton
- Interactive map of Sainte-Marie 1st Canton Nord
- Coordinates: 14.7823°N 60.9985°W
- Country: France
- Overseas region and department: Martinique
- No. of communes: {{{nbcomm}}}
- Disbanded: 2015
- Population (2012): 7,017

Sainte-Marie 1st Canton Nord is a former canton in the Arrondissement of La Trinité on Martinique. It had 7,017 inhabitants (2012). It was disbanded in 2015. The canton comprised part of the commune of Sainte-Marie.
