= Le Lamentin 3rd Canton Est =

Coordinates: 14.6010°N 60.9990°W

Le Lamentin 3rd Canton Est is a former canton in the Arrondissement of Fort-de-France on Martinique. It had 12,643 inhabitants (2012). It was disbanded in 2015. The canton comprised part of the commune of Le Lamentin.
