= Sainte-Marie 2nd Canton Sud =

Coordinates: 14.7823°N 60.9985°W

Sainte-Marie 2nd Canton Sud is a former canton in the Arrondissement of La Trinité on Martinique. It had 10,325 inhabitants (2012). It was disbanded in 2015. The canton comprised part of the commune of Sainte-Marie.
