= Le Lamentin 2nd Canton Nord =

Coordinates: 14.6010°N 60.9990°W

Le Lamentin 2nd Canton Nord is a former canton in the Arrondissement of Fort-de-France on Martinique. It had 19,066 inhabitants (2012). It was disbanded in 2015. The canton comprised part of the commune of Le Lamentin.
