= Le Robert 1st Canton Sud =

Coordinates: 14.6779°N 60.9393°W

Le Robert 1st Canton Sud is a former canton in the Arrondissement of La Trinité on Martinique. It had 8,941 inhabitants in 2012, but was disbanded in 2015. The canton comprised part of the commune of Le Robert.
