= Canton of Le Marigot =

Coordinates: 14.8167°N 61.0333°W

The Canton of Le Marigot is a former canton in the Arrondissement of La Trinité on Martinique. It had 3,568 inhabitants (2012). It was disbanded in 2015. The canton comprised the commune of Le Marigot.
