= Canton of Le Vauclin =

Coordinates: 14.5456°N 60.8381°W

The Canton of Le Vauclin (French: canton du Vauclin, pronounced [kɑ̃tɔ̃ dy voklɛ̃]) is a former canton in the arrondissement of Le Marin, Martinique. It had 9,140 inhabitants (2012). It was disbanded in 2015. The canton comprised the commune of Le Vauclin.
