= Canton of Le Diamant =

Coordinates: 14.4792°N 61.0300°W

The Canton of Le Diamant is a former canton in the Arrondissement of Le Marin on Martinique. It had 5,983 inhabitants (2012). It was disbanded in 2015. The canton comprised the commune of Le Diamant.
