= Canton of Saint-Esprit =

Coordinates: 14°33′N 60°55′W

The Canton of Saint-Esprit is a former canton in the Arrondissement of Le Marin on Martinique. It had 9,595 inhabitants (2012). It was disbanded in 2015. The canton comprised the commune of Saint-Esprit.
