= Canton of Sainte-Anne =

Coordinates: 14.4392°N 60.8789°W

The Canton of Sainte-Anne is a former canton in the Arrondissement of Le Marin on Martinique. It had 4,554 inhabitants (2012). It was disbanded in 2015. The canton comprised the commune of Sainte-Anne.
