= Canton of Les Anses-d'Arlet =

Coordinates: 14.4906°N 61.0806°W

The Canton of Les Anses-d'Arlet is a former canton in the Arrondissement of Le Marin on the island of Martinique. It had 3,900 inhabitants as of 2012. It was disbanded in 2015. The canton comprised the commune of Les Anses-d'Arlet.
