= Canton of Ducos =

Coordinates: 14.5753°N 60.9708°W

The Canton of Ducos is a former canton in the Arrondissement of Le Marin on Martinique. It had 17,039 inhabitants (2012). It was disbanded in 2015. The canton comprised the commune of Ducos.
