= Le François 2nd Canton Sud =

Coordinates: 14.6166°N 60.9037°W

Le François 2nd Canton Sud is a former canton in the Arrondissement of Le Marin on Martinique. It had 8,401 inhabitants (2012). It was disbanded in 2015. The canton comprised part of the commune of Le François.
