= Canton of Sainte-Luce =

Coordinates: 14.4667°N 60.9167°W

The Canton of Sainte-Luce is a former canton in the Arrondissement of Le Marin on Martinique. It had 10,083 inhabitants (2012). It was disbanded in 2015. The canton comprised the commune of Sainte-Luce.
