= Canton of Le Marin =

Coordinates: 14.4694°N 60.8658°W

The Canton of Le Marin is a former canton in the Arrondissement of Le Marin on Martinique. It had 8,547 inhabitants (2012). It was disbanded in 2015. The canton comprised the commune of Le Marin.
