= Canton of Rivière-Salée =

Coordinates: 14.5314°N 60.9800°W

The Canton of Rivière-Salée is a former canton in the Arrondissement of Le Marin on Martinique. It had 12,708 inhabitants (2012). It was disbanded in 2015. The canton comprised the commune of Rivière-Salée.
