= Canton of Les Trois-Îlets =

French ex-canton

Coordinates: 14.5333°N 61.0333°W

The Canton of Les Trois-Îlets is a former canton in the Arrondissement of Le Marin on Martinique. It had 7,587 inhabitants (2012). It was disbanded in 2015. The canton comprised the commune of Les Trois-Îlets.
