= Grand'Rivière =

- Commune
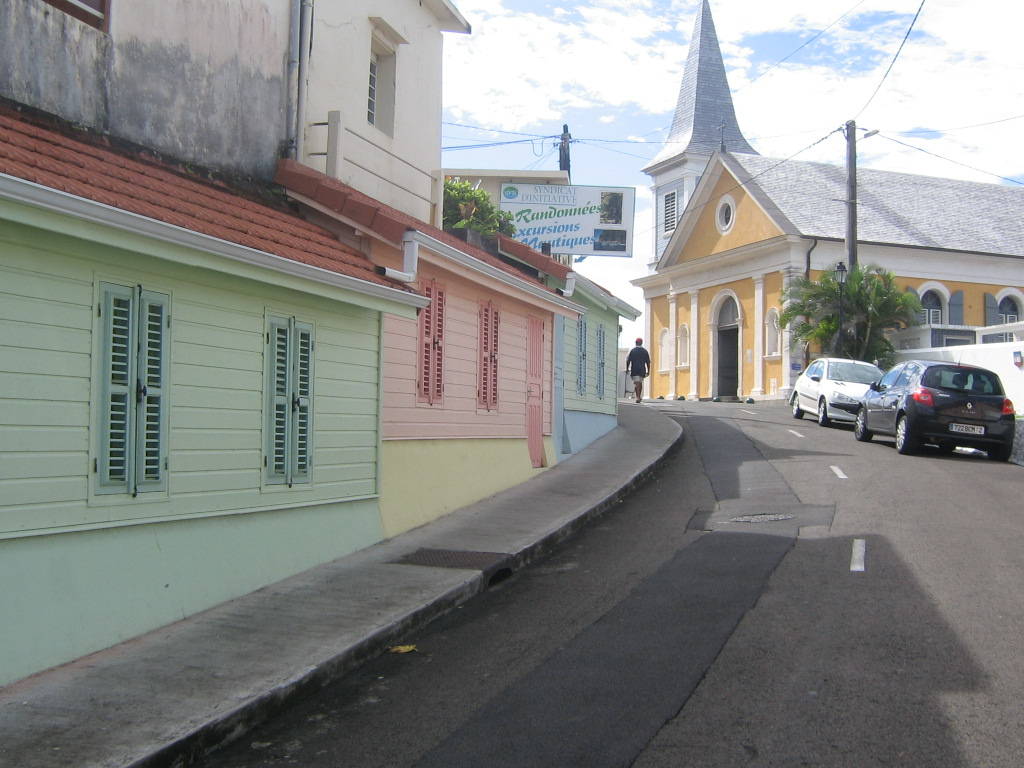
- Main street in Grand'Rivière

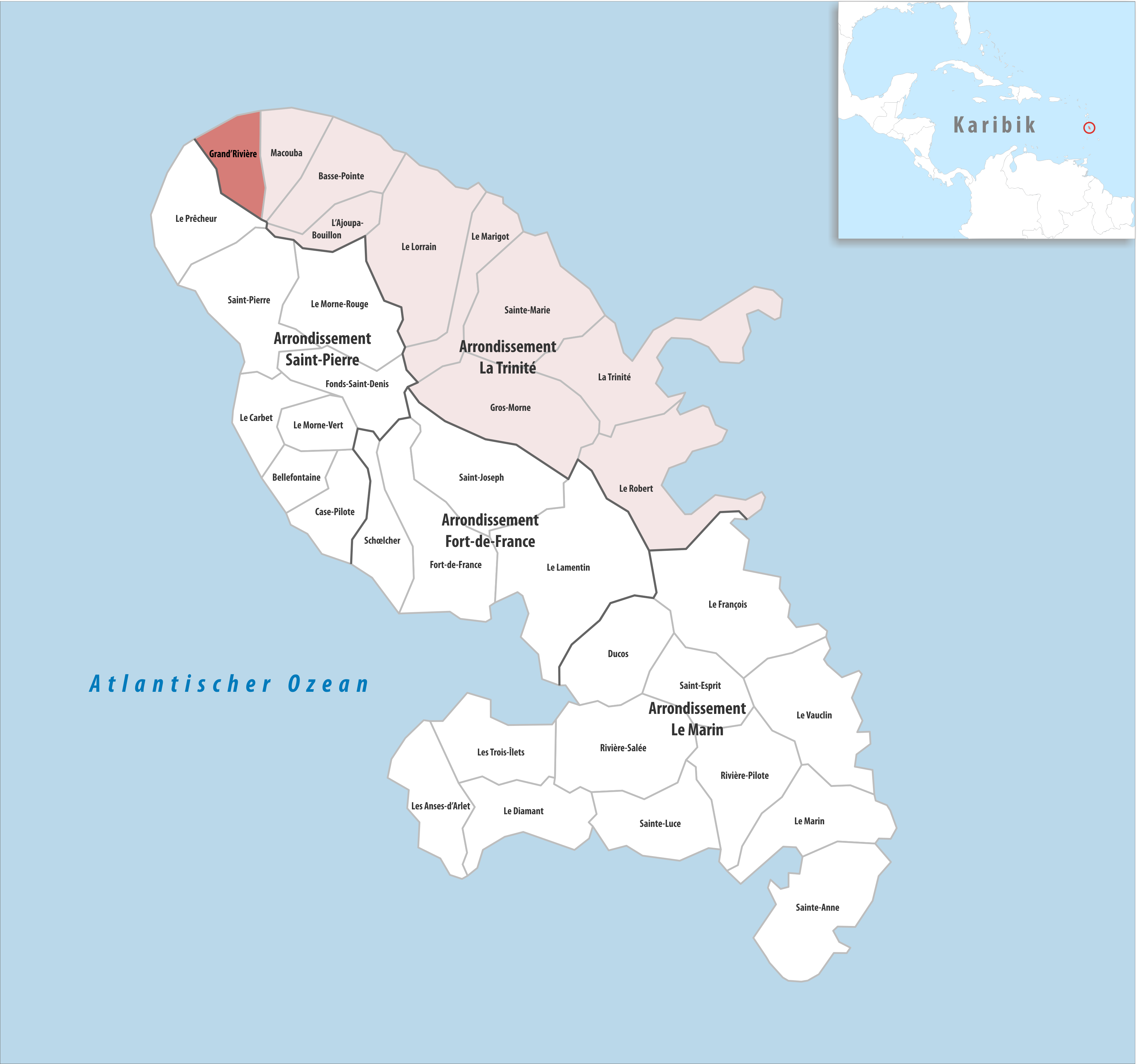
- Location of the commune (in red) within Martinique
- Location of Grand'Rivière
- Location within France
- Coordinates: 14°52′23″N 61°10′42″W
- Country: France
- Overseas region and department: Martinique
- Arrondissement: La Trinité
- Intercommunality: CA Pays Nord Martinique

Government
  - Mayor (2020–2026): Jean-Louis Marie-Louise
- Area^{1}: 16.60 km^{2} (6.41 sq mi)
- Highest elevation: 1,300 m (4,300 ft)
- Lowest elevation: 0 m (0 ft)
- Population (2023): 487
  - Density: 29.3/km^{2} (76.0/sq mi)
- Time zone: UTC−04:00 (AST)
- INSEE/Postal code: 97211 /97218
- ^{1} French Land Register data, which excludes lakes, ponds, glaciers > 1 km^{2} (0.386 sq mi or 247 acres) and river estuaries.

Grand'Rivière (French pronunciation: [ɡʁɑ̃ʁivjɛʁ]) is a village and commune in the French overseas department of Martinique.

== See also ==
- Communes of the Martinique department
