= Canton of Le Prêcheur =

Canton of France

Coordinates: 14.8000°N 61.2167°W

The Canton of Le Prêcheur is a former canton in the Arrondissement of Saint-Pierre on Martinique. It had 1,644 inhabitants (2012). It was disbanded in 2015. The canton comprised the commune of Le Prêcheur.
