= Canton of Basse-Pointe =

Coordinates: 14.8689°N 61.1211°W

The Canton of Basse-Pointe is a former canton in the Arrondissement of La Trinité on Martinique. It had 3,609 inhabitants (2012). It was disbanded in 2015. The canton comprised the commune of Basse-Pointe.
