= Canton of Le Lorrain =

Former canton in La Trinité arrondissement, Martinique

Coordinates: 14°49′N 61°04′W

The Canton of Le Lorrain is a former canton in the Arrondissement of La Trinité on Martinique. It had 7,294 inhabitants (2012). It was disbanded in 2015. The canton comprised the commune of Le Lorrain.
