= Macouba =

- Commune
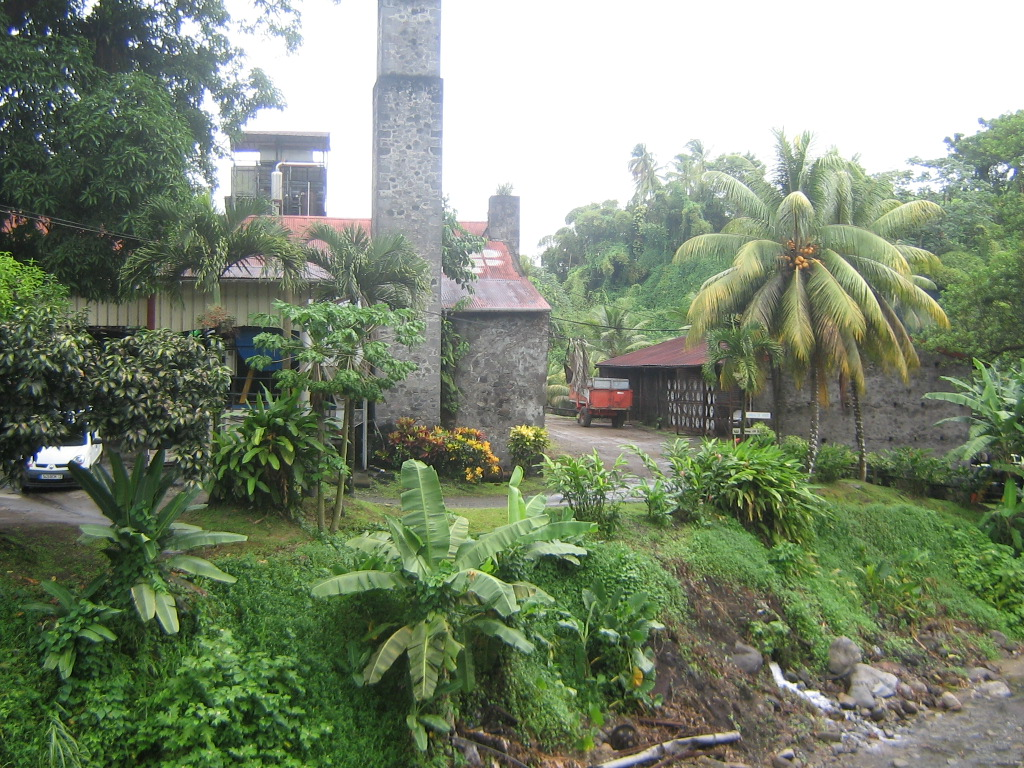
- The distillery of Fonds-Préville, in Macouba

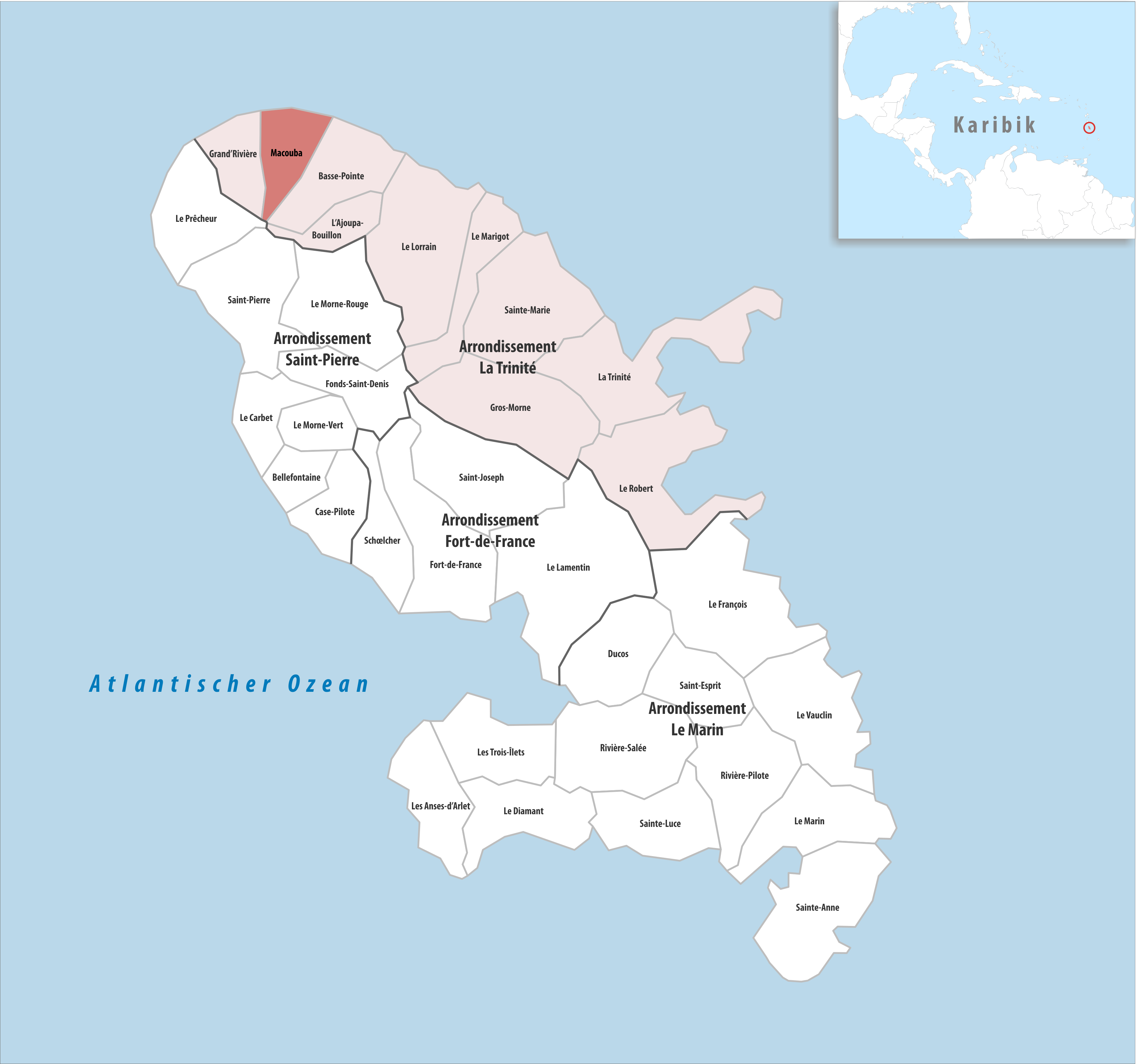
- Location of the commune (in red) within Martinique
- Location of Macouba
- Location within France
- Coordinates: 14°52′32″N 61°08′35″W
- Country: France
- Overseas region and department: Martinique
- Arrondissement: La Trinité
- Intercommunality: CA Pays Nord Martinique

Government
  - Mayor (2020–2026): Sainte-Rose Cakin
- Area^{1}: 16.93 km^{2} (6.54 sq mi)
- Highest elevation: 1,300 m (4,300 ft)
- Lowest elevation: 0 m (0 ft)
- Population (2023): 987
  - Density: 58.3/km^{2} (151/sq mi)
- Time zone: UTC−04:00 (AST)
- INSEE/Postal code: 97215 /97218
- ^{1} French Land Register data, which excludes lakes, ponds, glaciers > 1 km^{2} (0.386 sq mi or 247 acres) and river estuaries.

Macouba (French pronunciation: [makuba]) is a village and commune in the French overseas department of Martinique.

== Geography ==
=== Climate ===
Macouba has a tropical rainforest climate (Köppen climate classification Af). The average annual temperature in Macouba is 25.4 °C (77.7 °F). The average annual rainfall is 2,803.8 mm (110.39 in) with November as the wettest month. The temperatures are highest on average in September, at around 26.5 °C (79.7 °F), and lowest in January, at around 24.0 °C (75.2 °F). The highest temperature ever recorded in Macouba was 34.0 °C (93.2 °F) on 19 September 1999; the coldest temperature ever recorded was 16.0 °C (60.8 °F) on 12 March 1974.

Climate data for Macouba (1991−2020 normals, extremes 1974−present)
Month	Jan	Feb	Mar	Apr	May	Jun	Jul	Aug	Sep	Oct	Nov	Dec	Year
Record high °C (°F)	30.0 (86.0)	31.0 (87.8)	32.2 (90.0)	32.3 (90.1)	32.5 (90.5)	32.1 (89.8)	33.2 (91.8)	34.0 (93.2)	34.0 (93.2)	33.0 (91.4)	32.0 (89.6)	30.5 (86.9)	34.0 (93.2)
Mean daily maximum °C (°F)	26.9 (80.4)	27.0 (80.6)	27.7 (81.9)	28.5 (83.3)	29.1 (84.4)	29.2 (84.6)	29.3 (84.7)	29.7 (85.5)	29.9 (85.8)	29.3 (84.7)	28.4 (83.1)	27.5 (81.5)	28.5 (83.3)
Daily mean °C (°F)	24.0 (75.2)	24.0 (75.2)	24.4 (75.9)	25.2 (77.4)	25.9 (78.6)	26.2 (79.2)	26.3 (79.3)	26.5 (79.7)	26.5 (79.7)	26.1 (79.0)	25.4 (77.7)	24.6 (76.3)	25.4 (77.7)
Mean daily minimum °C (°F)	21.1 (70.0)	20.9 (69.6)	21.2 (70.2)	21.8 (71.2)	22.6 (72.7)	23.3 (73.9)	23.3 (73.9)	23.4 (74.1)	23.2 (73.8)	22.9 (73.2)	22.5 (72.5)	21.7 (71.1)	22.3 (72.1)
Record low °C (°F)	17.5 (63.5)	16.5 (61.7)	16.0 (60.8)	18.0 (64.4)	19.0 (66.2)	19.0 (66.2)	19.0 (66.2)	19.0 (66.2)	19.0 (66.2)	19.0 (66.2)	19.0 (66.2)	17.0 (62.6)	16.0 (60.8)
Average precipitation mm (inches)	173.8 (6.84)	103.4 (4.07)	124.1 (4.89)	199.4 (7.85)	201.4 (7.93)	213.7 (8.41)	265.0 (10.43)	294.1 (11.58)	294.3 (11.59)	311.6 (12.27)	375.2 (14.77)	247.8 (9.76)	2,803.8 (110.39)
Average precipitation days (≥ 1.0 mm)	21.3	16.6	16.1	16.9	17.1	19.3	22.2	23.2	19.7	21.3	22.2	20.9	236.7
Source: Météo-France

== See also ==
- Communes of the Martinique department
