= Canton of L'Ajoupa-Bouillon =

Coordinates: 14.8167°N 61.1167°W

The Canton of L'Ajoupa-Bouillon is a former canton in the Arrondissement of La Trinité on Martinique. It had 1,788 inhabitants (2012). It was disbanded in 2015. The canton comprised the commune of L'Ajoupa-Bouillon.
