= Canton of Rivière-Pilote =

Coordinates: 14°28′N 60°54′W

The Canton of Rivière-Pilote is a former canton in the Arrondissement of Le Marin on Martinique. It had 12,680 inhabitants (2012). It was disbanded in 2015. The canton comprised the commune of Rivière-Pilote.
