= Canton of La Trinité =

Canton of France (until March 2015)

Coordinates: 14.7333°N 60.9667°W

The Canton of La Trinité is a former canton in the Arrondissement of La Trinité on Martinique. It had 13,352 inhabitants (2012). It was disbanded in 2015. The canton comprised the commune of La Trinité.
