= Saint-Joseph, Martinique =

Saint-Joseph
- Commune
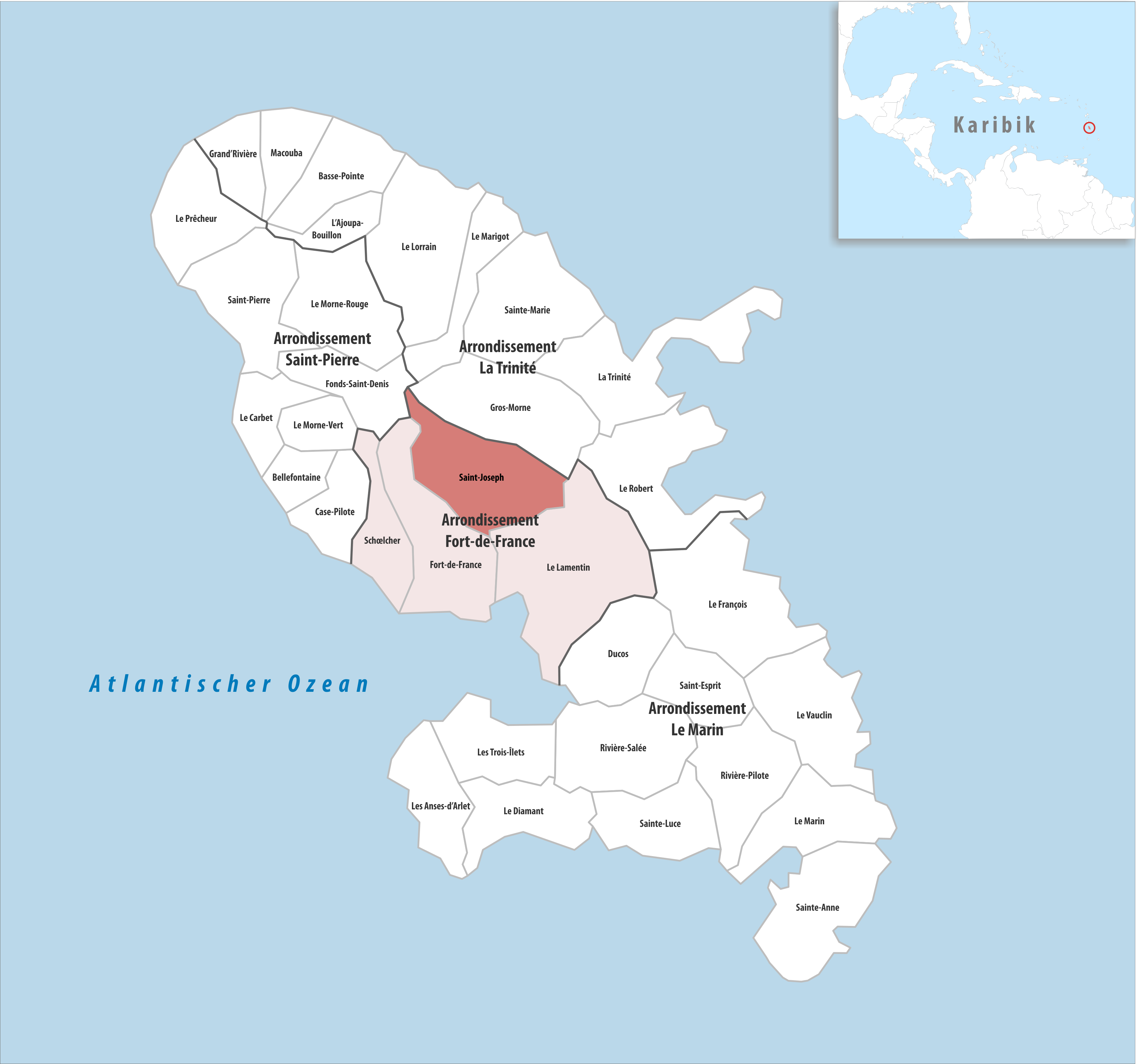
- Location of the commune (in red) within Martinique
- Location of Saint-Joseph
- Coordinates: 14°40′15″N 61°02′15″W
- Country: France
- Overseas region and department: Martinique
- Arrondissement: Fort-de-France
- Intercommunality: CA Centre de la Martinique

Government
  - Mayor (2020–2026): Yan Monplaisir
- Area^{1}: 43.29 km^{2} (16.71 sq mi)
- Highest elevation: 762 m (2,500 ft)
- Lowest elevation: 20 m (66 ft)
- Population (2023): 16,258
  - Density: 375.6/km^{2} (972.7/sq mi)
- Time zone: UTC−04:00 (AST)
- INSEE/Postal code: 97224 /97212
- ^{1} French Land Register data, which excludes lakes, ponds, glaciers > 1 km^{2} (0.386 sq mi or 247 acres) and river estuaries.

Saint-Joseph (French pronunciation: [sɛ̃ ʒozɛf]) is a commune in the Arrondissement of Fort-de-France on Martinique.

== Geography ==
=== Climate ===
Saint-Joseph has a tropical rainforest climate (Köppen climate classification Af). The average annual temperature in Saint-Joseph is 26.3 °C (79.3 °F). The average annual rainfall is 2,404.2 mm (94.65 in) with November as the wettest month. The temperatures are highest on average in August, at around 27.3 °C (81.1 °F), and lowest in February, at around 24.9 °C (76.8 °F). The highest temperature ever recorded in Saint-Joseph was 34.9 °C (94.8 °F) on 20 September 2005; the coldest temperature ever recorded was 15.2 °C (59.4 °F) on 12 January 1979.

Climate data for Saint-Joseph (1991–2020 averages, extremes 1976−present)
Month	Jan	Feb	Mar	Apr	May	Jun	Jul	Aug	Sep	Oct	Nov	Dec	Year
Record high °C (°F)	30.2 (86.4)	32.5 (90.5)	32.9 (91.2)	33.1 (91.6)	33.3 (91.9)	32.7 (90.9)	32.2 (90.0)	34.7 (94.5)	34.9 (94.8)	33.6 (92.5)	32.6 (90.7)	31.9 (89.4)	34.9 (94.8)
Mean daily maximum °C (°F)	28.1 (82.6)	28.2 (82.8)	28.6 (83.5)	29.2 (84.6)	29.8 (85.6)	29.9 (85.8)	29.9 (85.8)	30.5 (86.9)	30.9 (87.6)	30.5 (86.9)	29.6 (85.3)	28.7 (83.7)	29.5 (85.1)
Daily mean °C (°F)	25.0 (77.0)	24.9 (76.8)	25.2 (77.4)	25.9 (78.6)	26.7 (80.1)	27.1 (80.8)	27.1 (80.8)	27.3 (81.1)	27.2 (81.0)	26.9 (80.4)	26.3 (79.3)	25.5 (77.9)	26.3 (79.3)
Mean daily minimum °C (°F)	21.8 (71.2)	21.6 (70.9)	21.8 (71.2)	22.6 (72.7)	23.6 (74.5)	24.4 (75.9)	24.3 (75.7)	24.1 (75.4)	23.5 (74.3)	23.3 (73.9)	23.0 (73.4)	22.3 (72.1)	23.0 (73.4)
Record low °C (°F)	15.2 (59.4)	15.5 (59.9)	15.6 (60.1)	16.0 (60.8)	19.0 (66.2)	20.0 (68.0)	20.0 (68.0)	18.0 (64.4)	19.3 (66.7)	19.0 (66.2)	19.0 (66.2)	16.0 (60.8)	15.2 (59.4)
Average rainfall mm (inches)	141.7 (5.58)	95.9 (3.78)	103.5 (4.07)	172.8 (6.80)	169.8 (6.69)	190.6 (7.50)	237.0 (9.33)	275.8 (10.86)	255.1 (10.04)	298.0 (11.73)	288.5 (11.36)	175.5 (6.91)	2,404.2 (94.65)
Average rainy days (≥ 1.0 mm)	20.4	16.4	15.6	15.7	16.3	19.2	22.3	22.1	20.1	21.8	22.1	19.8	231.6
Source: Météo-France

== Population ==
Historical population
Year	Pop.	±% p.a.
1967	10,923	—
1974	10,950	+0.04%
1982	11,266	+0.36%
1990	14,036	+2.79%
1999	15,785	+1.31%
2007	17,215	+1.09%
2012	16,648	−0.67%
2017	16,232	−0.50%
2023	16,258	+0.03%
Source: INSEE

== See also ==
- Communes of the Martinique department
