= Le François 1st Canton Nord =

Canton of France

Coordinates: 14.6166°N 60.9037°W

Le François 1st Canton Nord is a former canton in the Arrondissement of Le Marin on Martinique. It had 10,051 inhabitants (2012). It was disbanded in 2015. The canton comprised part of the commune of Le François.
