= Le Marigot =

- Commune
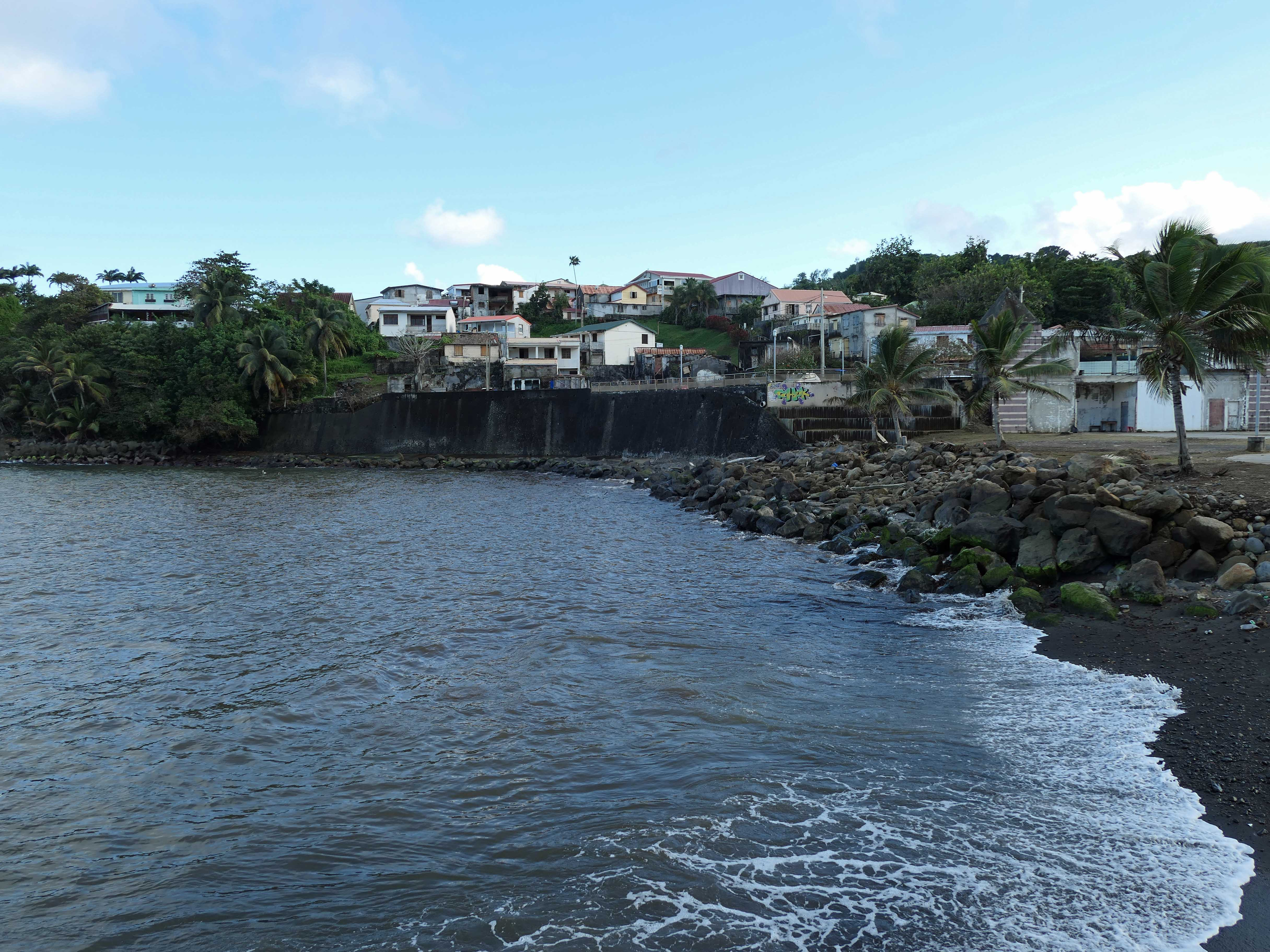

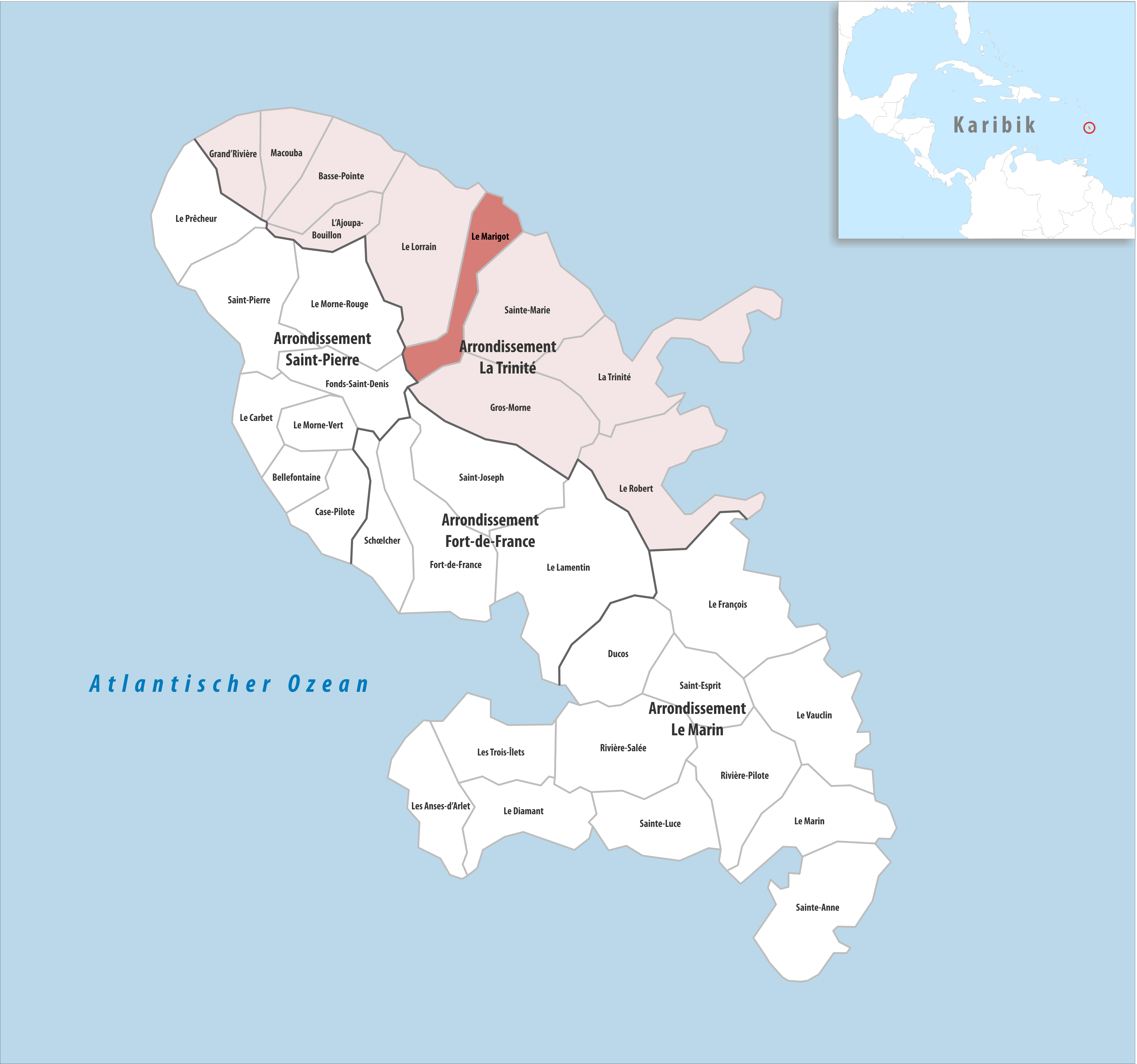
- Location of the commune (in red) within Martinique
- Location of Le Marigot
- Coordinates: 14°49′N 61°02′W
- Country: France
- Overseas region and department: Martinique
- Arrondissement: La Trinité
- Intercommunality: CAP Nord Martinique

Government
  - Mayor (2020–2026): Joseph Péraste
- Area^{1}: 21.63 km^{2} (8.35 sq mi)
- Highest elevation: 694 m (2,277 ft)
- Lowest elevation: 0 m (0 ft)
- Population (2023): 2,948
  - Density: 136.3/km^{2} (353.0/sq mi)
- Demonym(s): Marigotin, Marigotine (French)
- Time zone: UTC−04:00 (AST)
- INSEE/Postal code: 97216 /97225
- ^{1} French Land Register data, which excludes lakes, ponds, glaciers > 1 km^{2} (0.386 sq mi or 247 acres) and river estuaries.

Le Marigot (French pronunciation: [lə maʁiɡo]; Martinican Creole: Mawigo) is a village and commune in the French overseas department of Martinique.

== Population ==
Historical population
Year	Pop.	±% p.a.
1967	3,715	—
1974	3,842	+0.48%
1982	3,498	−1.17%
1990	3,587	+0.31%
1999	3,663	+0.23%
2007	3,700	+0.13%
2012	3,568	−0.72%
2017	3,196	−2.18%
2023	2,948	−1.34%
Source: INSEE

== See also ==
- Communes of Martinique
