= Canton of Gros-Morne =

Coordinates: 14.7061°N 61.0086°W

The Canton of Gros-Morne is a former canton in the Arrondissement of La Trinité on Martinique. It had 10,250 inhabitants (2012). It was disbanded in 2015. The canton comprised the commune of Gros-Morne.
