= Canton of Le Morne-Rouge =

Canton of Martinique

Coordinates: 14.7689°N 61.1367°W

The Canton of Le Morne-Rouge is a former canton in the Arrondissement of Saint-Pierre on Martinique. It had 5,003 inhabitants (2012). It was disbanded in 2015. The canton comprised the commune of Le Morne-Rouge.
