= Fort-de-France 7th Canton =

Coordinates: 14.6010°N 61.0823°W

Fort-de-France 7th Canton is a former canton in the Arrondissement of Fort-de-France on Martinique. It had 19,931 inhabitants (2012). It was disbanded in 2015. The canton comprised part of the commune of Fort-de-France.
