= Le Robert =

- Commune
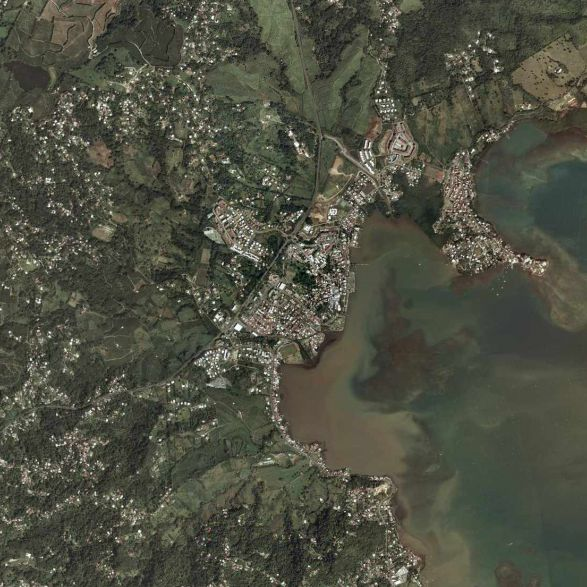
- An aerial view of Le Robert

- Coat of arms

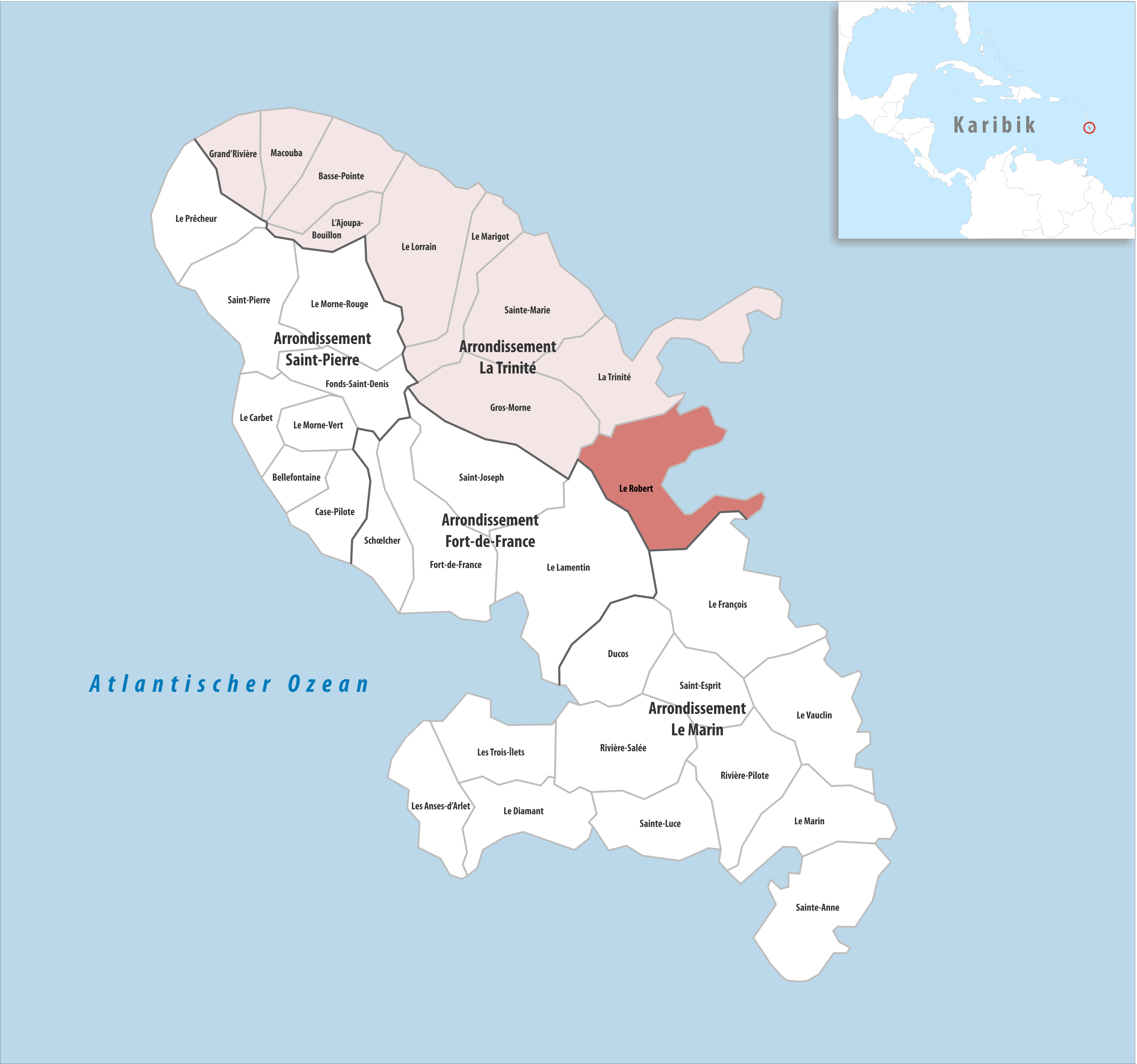
- Location of the commune (in red) within Martinique
- Location of Le Robert
- Coordinates: 14°40′45″N 60°56′25″W
- Country: France
- Overseas region and department: Martinique
- Arrondissement: La Trinité
- Intercommunality: CA Pays Nord Martinique

Government
  - Mayor (2023–2026): Farell Francois-Haugrin
- Area^{1}: 47.30 km^{2} (18.26 sq mi)
- Highest elevation: 317 m (1,040 ft)
- Lowest elevation: 0 m (0 ft)
- Population (2023): 21,553
  - Density: 455.7/km^{2} (1,180/sq mi)
- Demonym: Robertin(e)
- Time zone: UTC−04:00 (AST)
- INSEE/Postal code: 97222 /97231
- ^{1} French Land Register data, which excludes lakes, ponds, glaciers > 1 km^{2} (0.386 sq mi or 247 acres) and river estuaries.

Le Robert (French pronunciation: [lə ʁɔbɛʁ]; Antillean Creole: Wobè) is a town and the third-largest commune in the French overseas department of Martinique. It is located in the northeastern (Atlantic) side of the island of Martinique. It contains the Sainte Rose-de-Lima church, Club Nautique Wind Force club, Stade Municipal du Robert and a sportsground. The village of Hyacinthe lies in the commune.

== History ==
The Hôtel de Ville

The Hôtel de Ville was completed in 1933.

== Population ==
Historical population
Year	Pop.	±% p.a.
1967	13,905	—
1974	14,505	+0.61%
1982	15,386	+0.74%
1990	17,713	+1.78%
1999	21,240	+2.04%
2007	24,068	+1.57%
2012	23,715	−0.30%
2017	22,719	−0.85%
2023	21,553	−0.87%
Source: INSEE

== Notable people ==
- Édouard de Lépine (1932- 2020), historian and politician
- Ronny Turiaf, NBA basketball player for the Los Angeles Clippers

== See also ==
- Communes of the Martinique department
