= Schœlcher =

- Commune
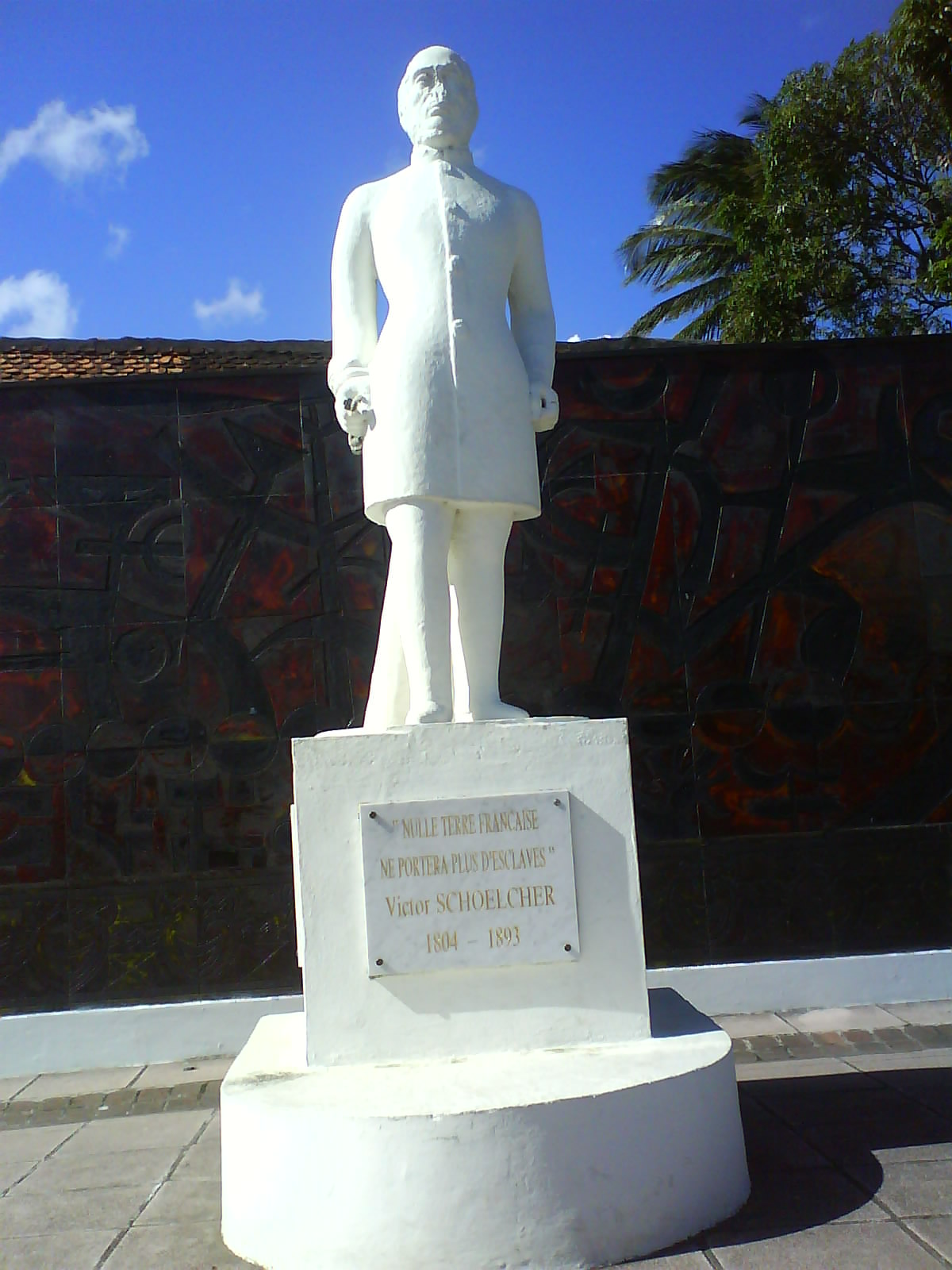
- A statue of Victor Schœlcher, in Schœlcher

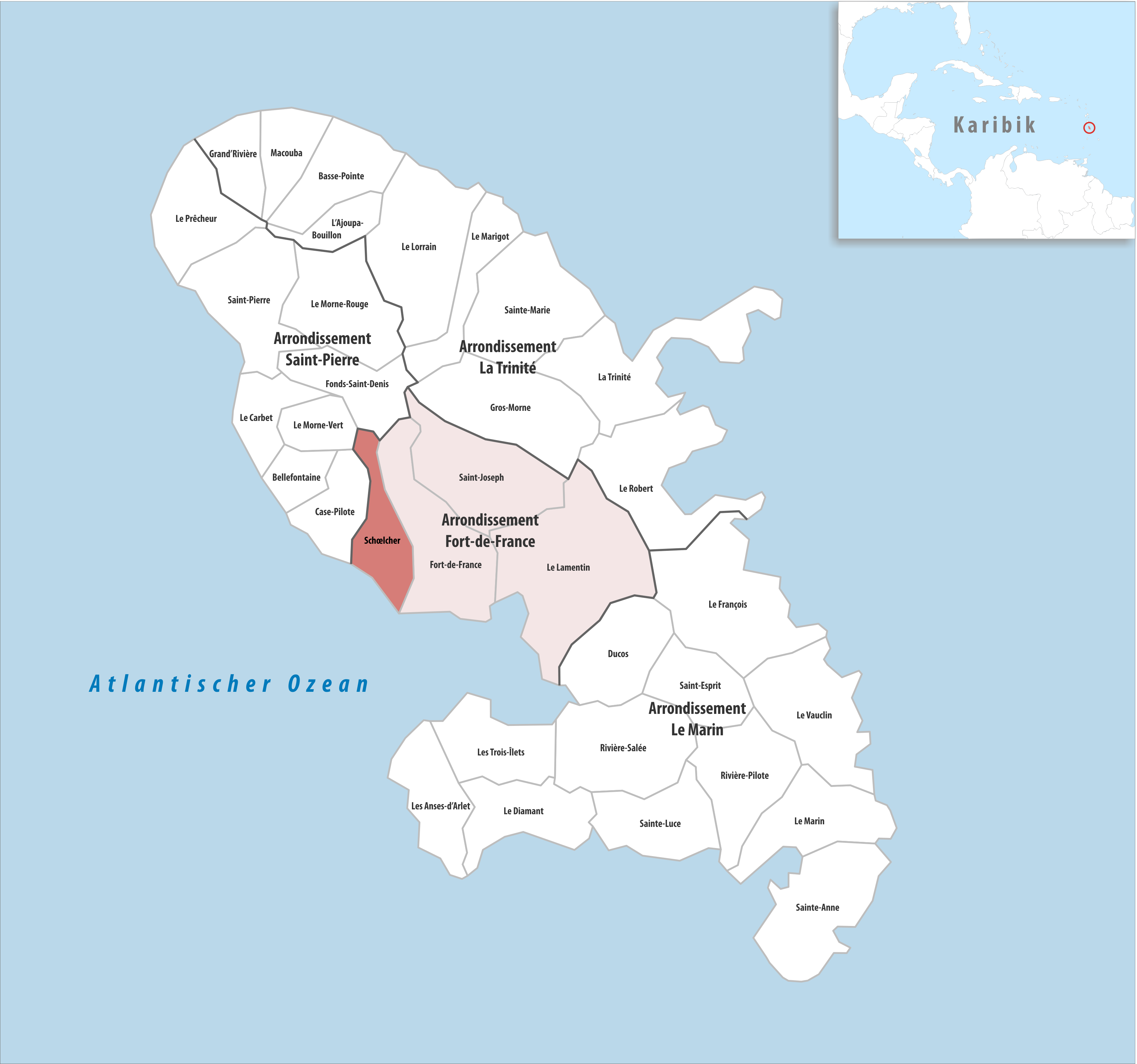
- Location of the commune (in red) within Martinique
- Location of Schœlcher
- Coordinates: 14°37′N 61°06′W
- Country: France
- Overseas region and department: Martinique
- Arrondissement: Fort-de-France
- Intercommunality: CA Centre de la Martinique

Government
  - Mayor (2020–2026): Luc-Louison Clémenté
- Area^{1}: 21.17 km^{2} (8.17 sq mi)
- Highest elevation: 1,196 m (3,924 ft)
- Lowest elevation: 0 m (0 ft)
- Population (2023): 19,478
  - Density: 920.1/km^{2} (2,383/sq mi)
- Time zone: UTC−04:00 (AST)
- INSEE/Postal code: 97229 /97233
- ^{1} French Land Register data, which excludes lakes, ponds, glaciers > 1 km^{2} (0.386 sq mi or 247 acres) and river estuaries.

Schœlcher (French pronunciation: [ʃœlʃɛʁ]; Martinican Creole: Chelchè) is a town and the fourth-largest commune in the French overseas department of Martinique. The town was named Case-Navire until 1889, when it was renamed in honor of French abolitionist writer Victor Schœlcher.

== Geography ==
It is located on the west (Caribbean Sea) side of the island of Martinique, and is part of the metropolitan area of Fort-de-France, the largest metropolitan area in Martinique.

== Population ==
Historical population
Year	Pop.	±% p.a.
1967	13,241	—
1974	14,749	+1.55%
1982	18,094	+2.59%
1990	19,825	+1.15%
1999	20,845	+0.56%
2007	21,510	+0.39%
2012	20,103	−1.34%
2017	19,997	−0.11%
2023	19,478	−0.44%
Source: INSEE

== Notable people ==
- Johnny Hajjar (born 17 January 1973), Member of the French National Assembly
- Mélanie Johanna de Jesus dos Santos (born 5 March 2000), French artistic gymnast
- Wendie Renard (born 1990), football player and captain for Lyon and the France national team

== See also ==
- Communes of Martinique
