= Sainte-Marie, Martinique =

Sainte-Marie
- Commune
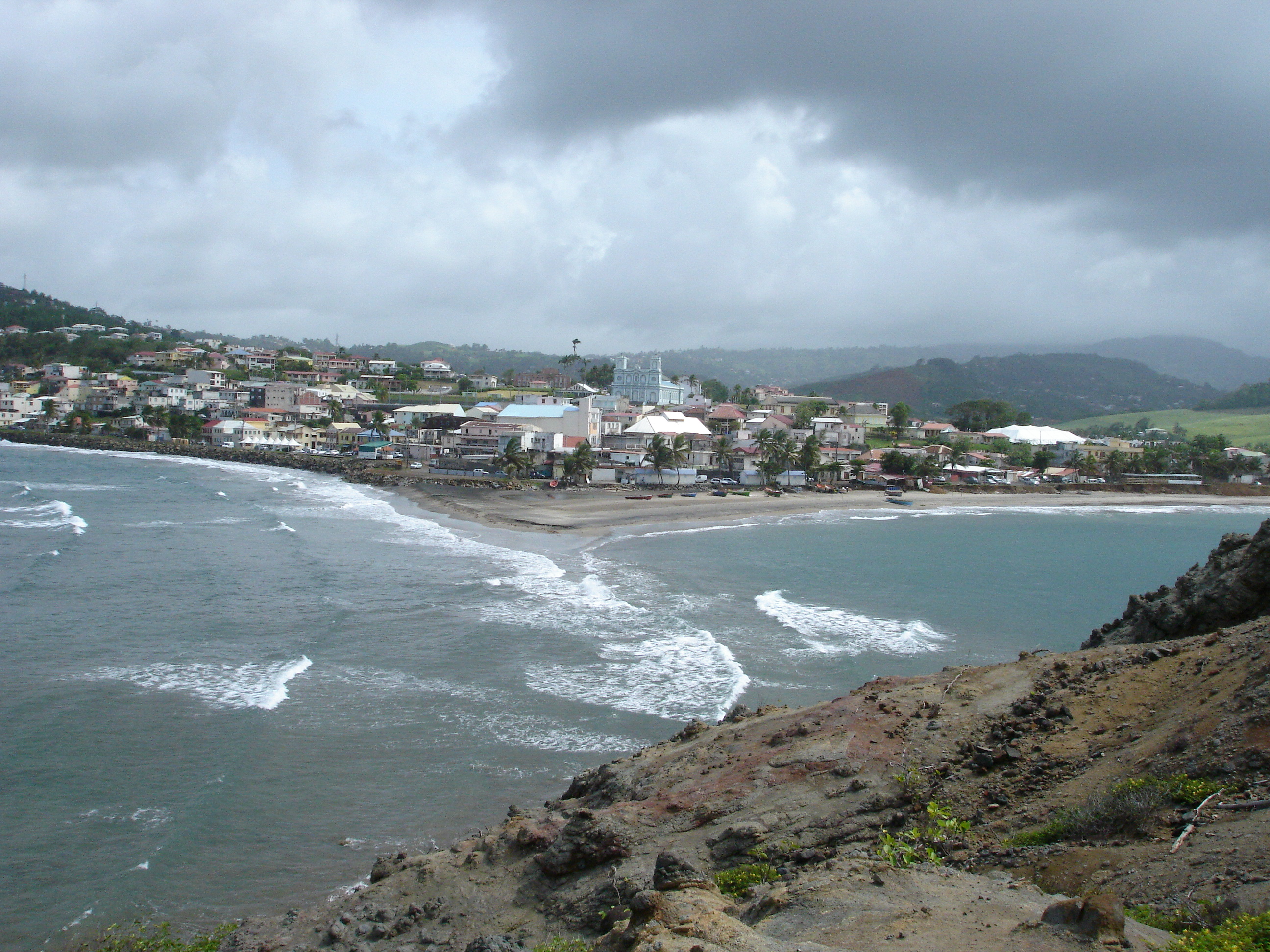
- A view of Sainte-Marie from the islet

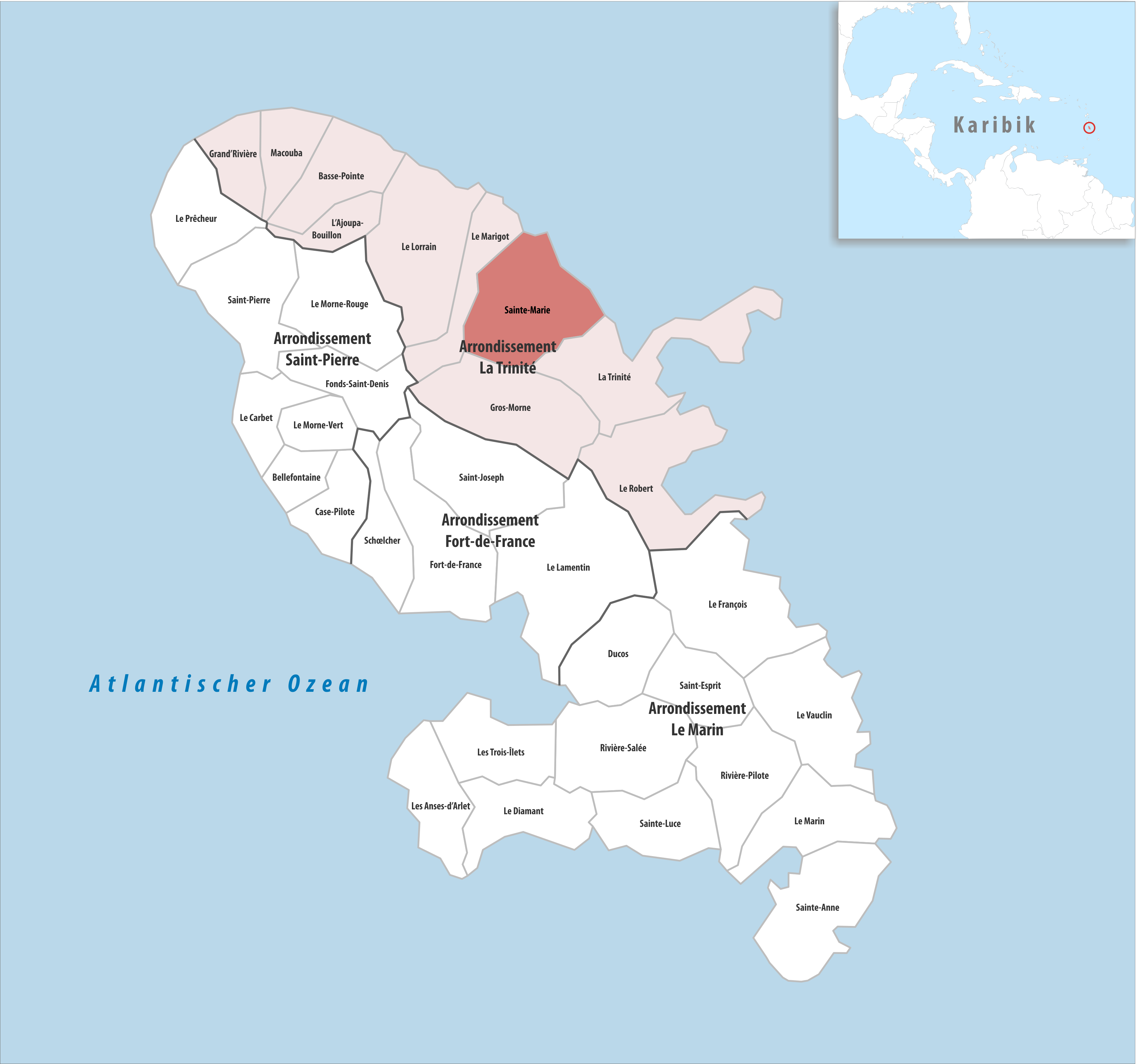
- Location of the commune (in red) within Martinique
- Location of Sainte-Marie
- Coordinates: 14°44′N 61°01′W
- Country: France
- Overseas region and department: Martinique
- Arrondissement: La Trinité
- Intercommunality: CA Pays Nord Martinique

Government
  - Mayor (2020–2026): Bruno Nestor Azérot
- Area^{1}: 44.55 km^{2} (17.20 sq mi)
- Highest elevation: 574 m (1,883 ft)
- Lowest elevation: 0 m (0 ft)
- Population (2023): 14,756
  - Density: 331.2/km^{2} (857.9/sq mi)
- Time zone: UTC−04:00 (AST)
- INSEE/Postal code: 97228 /97230
- ^{1} French Land Register data, which excludes lakes, ponds, glaciers > 1 km^{2} (0.386 sq mi or 247 acres) and river estuaries.

Sainte-Marie (French pronunciation: [sɛ̃t maʁi]; Martinican Creole: Sentmawi) is a town and the fifth-largest commune in the French overseas department of Martinique. It is located on the northeast (Atlantic Ocean) side of the island of Martinique.

== Geography ==
=== Climate ===
Sainte-Marie has a tropical rainforest climate (Köppen climate classification Af). The average annual temperature in Sainte-Marie is 26.5 °C (79.7 °F). The average annual rainfall is 2,781.3 mm (109.50 in) with November as the wettest month. The temperatures are highest on average in August, at around 27.5 °C (81.5 °F), and lowest in January, at around 25.1 °C (77.2 °F). The highest temperature ever recorded in Sainte-Marie was 35.0 °C (95.0 °F) on 23 September 2005; the coldest temperature ever recorded was 16.5 °C (61.7 °F) on 8 March 1987.

Climate data for Sainte-Marie (1991−2020 normals, extremes 1979−2009)
Month	Jan	Feb	Mar	Apr	May	Jun	Jul	Aug	Sep	Oct	Nov	Dec	Year
Record high °C (°F)	31.5 (88.7)	33.0 (91.4)	32.0 (89.6)	34.5 (94.1)	34.5 (94.1)	34.0 (93.2)	34.0 (93.2)	35.0 (95.0)	35.0 (95.0)	34.5 (94.1)	34.0 (93.2)	32.0 (89.6)	35.0 (95.0)
Mean daily maximum °C (°F)	28.9 (84.0)	29.0 (84.2)	29.5 (85.1)	30.3 (86.5)	31.0 (87.8)	30.9 (87.6)	31.1 (88.0)	31.6 (88.9)	31.7 (89.1)	31.4 (88.5)	30.4 (86.7)	29.6 (85.3)	30.4 (86.7)
Daily mean °C (°F)	25.1 (77.2)	25.1 (77.2)	25.4 (77.7)	26.2 (79.2)	27.0 (80.6)	27.3 (81.1)	27.3 (81.1)	27.5 (81.5)	27.5 (81.5)	27.2 (81.0)	26.4 (79.5)	25.7 (78.3)	26.5 (79.7)
Mean daily minimum °C (°F)	21.3 (70.3)	21.2 (70.2)	21.4 (70.5)	22.1 (71.8)	22.9 (73.2)	23.7 (74.7)	23.6 (74.5)	23.4 (74.1)	23.2 (73.8)	23.1 (73.6)	22.5 (72.5)	21.8 (71.2)	25.5 (77.9)
Record low °C (°F)	18.0 (64.4)	16.5 (61.7)	16.5 (61.7)	18.0 (64.4)	19.5 (67.1)	20.0 (68.0)	19.0 (66.2)	18.0 (64.4)	19.0 (66.2)	19.0 (66.2)	17.0 (62.6)	17.5 (63.5)	16.5 (61.7)
Average precipitation mm (inches)	167.4 (6.59)	103.2 (4.06)	125.9 (4.96)	213.6 (8.41)	215.1 (8.47)	196.2 (7.72)	248.4 (9.78)	275.0 (10.83)	283.5 (11.16)	346.9 (13.66)	374.9 (14.76)	231.2 (9.10)	2,781.3 (109.50)
Average precipitation days (≥ 1.0 mm)	21.6	16.6	17.0	16.3	17.4	19.4	23.2	23.0	20.7	22.7	23.6	21.2	242.7
Source: Météo-France

== Population ==
Historical population
Year	Pop.	±% p.a.
1967	19,515	—
1974	20,128	+0.44%
1982	18,526	−1.03%
1990	19,682	+0.76%
1999	20,098	+0.23%
2007	19,249	−0.54%
2012	17,342	−2.06%
2017	15,932	−1.68%
2023	14,756	−1.27%
Source: INSEE

== See also ==
- Communes of Martinique
