= Arrondissement of Le Marin =

Coordinates: 14°28′17″N 60°52′01″W

Le Marin
- Arrondissement
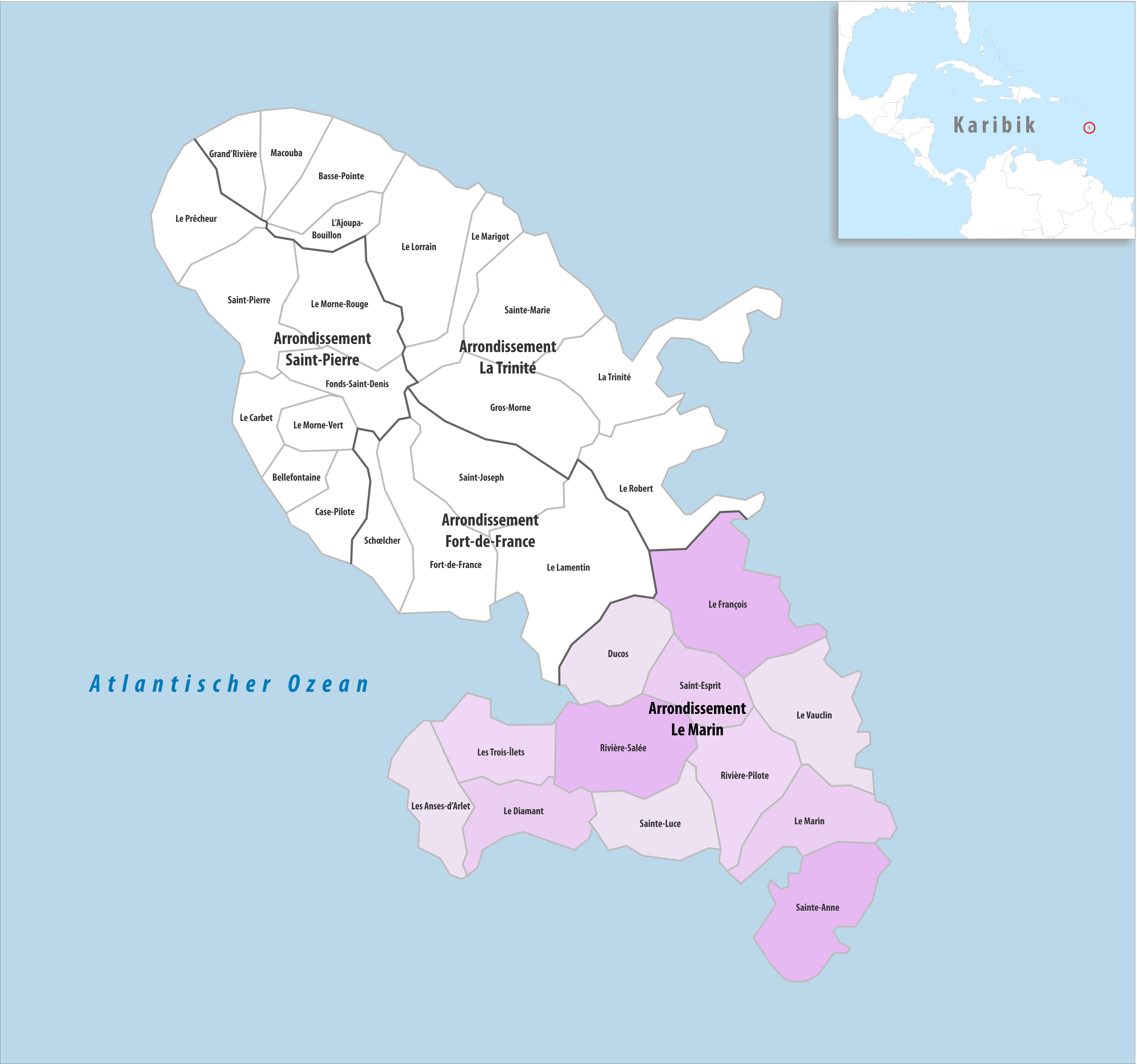
- Location within the region Martinique
- Country: France
- Overseas region and department: Martinique{{{region}}}
- No. of communes: {{{nbcomm}}}
- Area: 409.1 km^{2} (158.0 sq mi)
- Population (2023): 114,903
  - Density: 280.9/km^{2} (727.4/sq mi)
- INSEE code: 9723

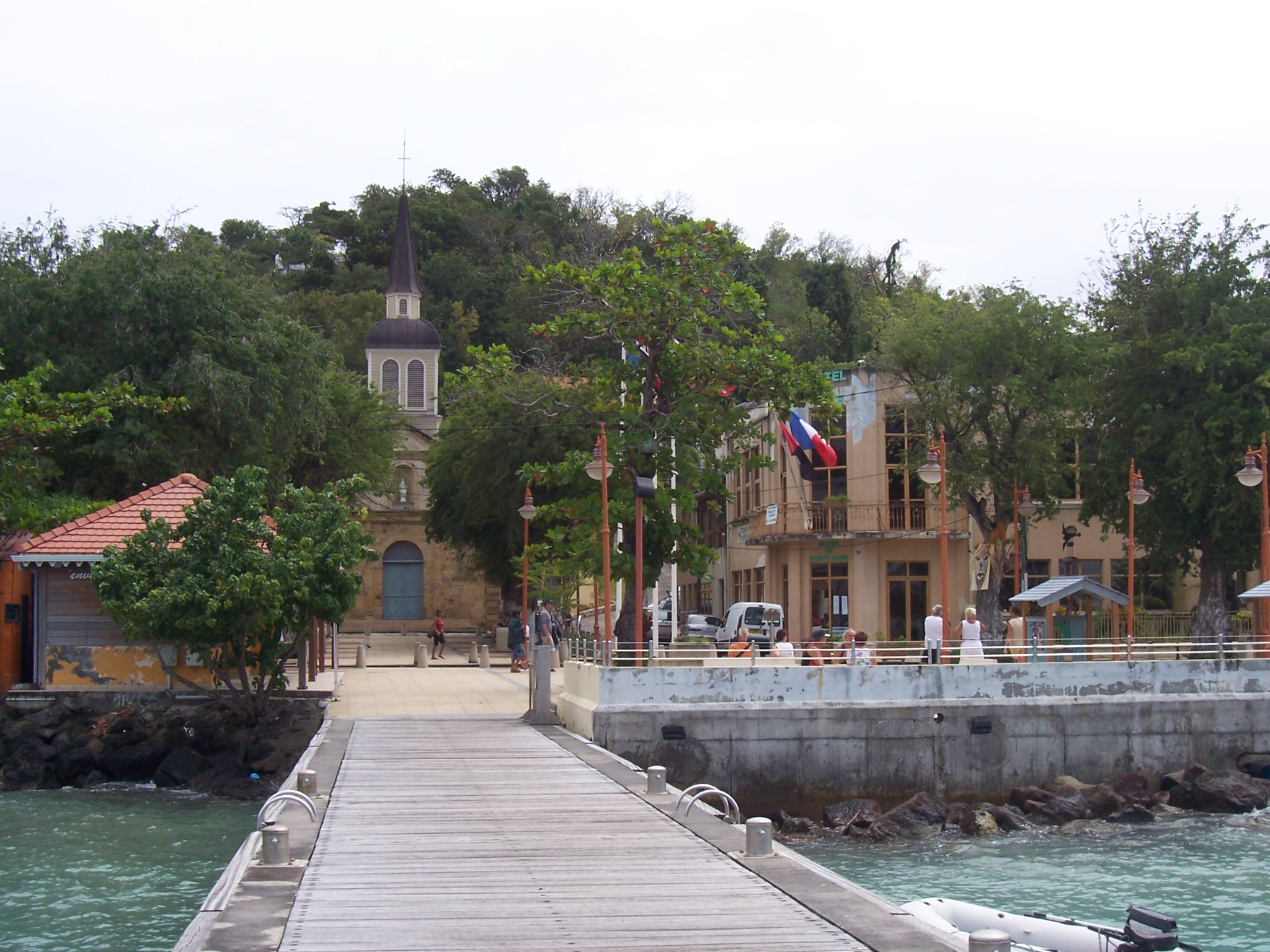
Saint-Anne in Le Marin, Martinique

The arrondissement of Le Marin (French: arrondissement du Marin) is an arrondissement in the French overseas region of Martinique. It has 12 communes. Its population is 115,068 (2021), and its area is 409.1 km^{2} (158.0 sq mi).

== Composition ==
The communes of the arrondissement of Le Marin, and their INSEE codes, are:

1. Les Anses-d'Arlet (97202)
2. Le Diamant (97206)
3. Ducos (97207)
4. Le François (97210)
5. Le Marin (97217)
6. Rivière-Pilote (97220)
7. Rivière-Salée (97221)
8. Sainte-Anne (97226)
9. Sainte-Luce (97227)
10. Saint-Esprit (97223)
11. Les Trois-Îlets (97231)
12. Le Vauclin (97232)

== History ==
The arrondissement of Le Marin, containing 12 communes that were previously part of the arrondissement of Fort-de-France, was created in 1974.

Before 2015, the arrondissements of Martinique were subdivided into cantons. The cantons of the arrondissement of Le Marin were, as of January 2015:

1. Les Anses-d'Arlet
2. Le Diamant
3. Ducos
4. Le François 1st Canton Nord
5. Le François 2nd Canton Sud
6. Le Marin
7. Rivière-Pilote
8. Rivière-Salée
9. Sainte-Anne
10. Sainte-Luce
11. Saint-Esprit
12. Les Trois-Îlets
13. Le Vauclin
