= Le Lamentin =

- Commune
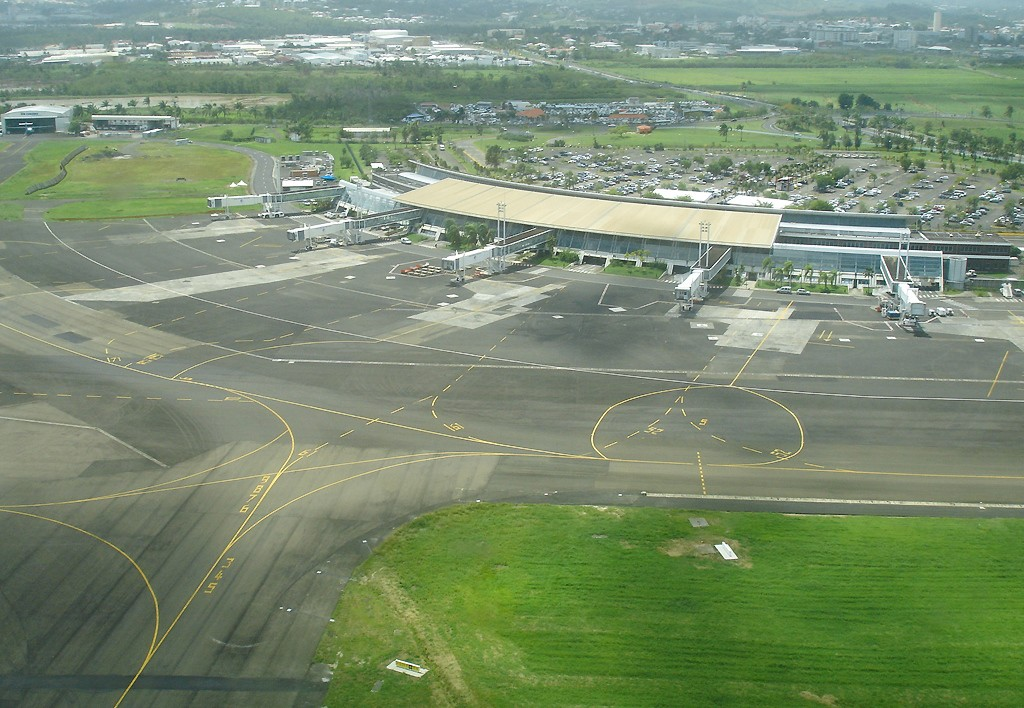
- Martinique Aimé Césaire International Airport in Le Lamentin

- Coat of arms

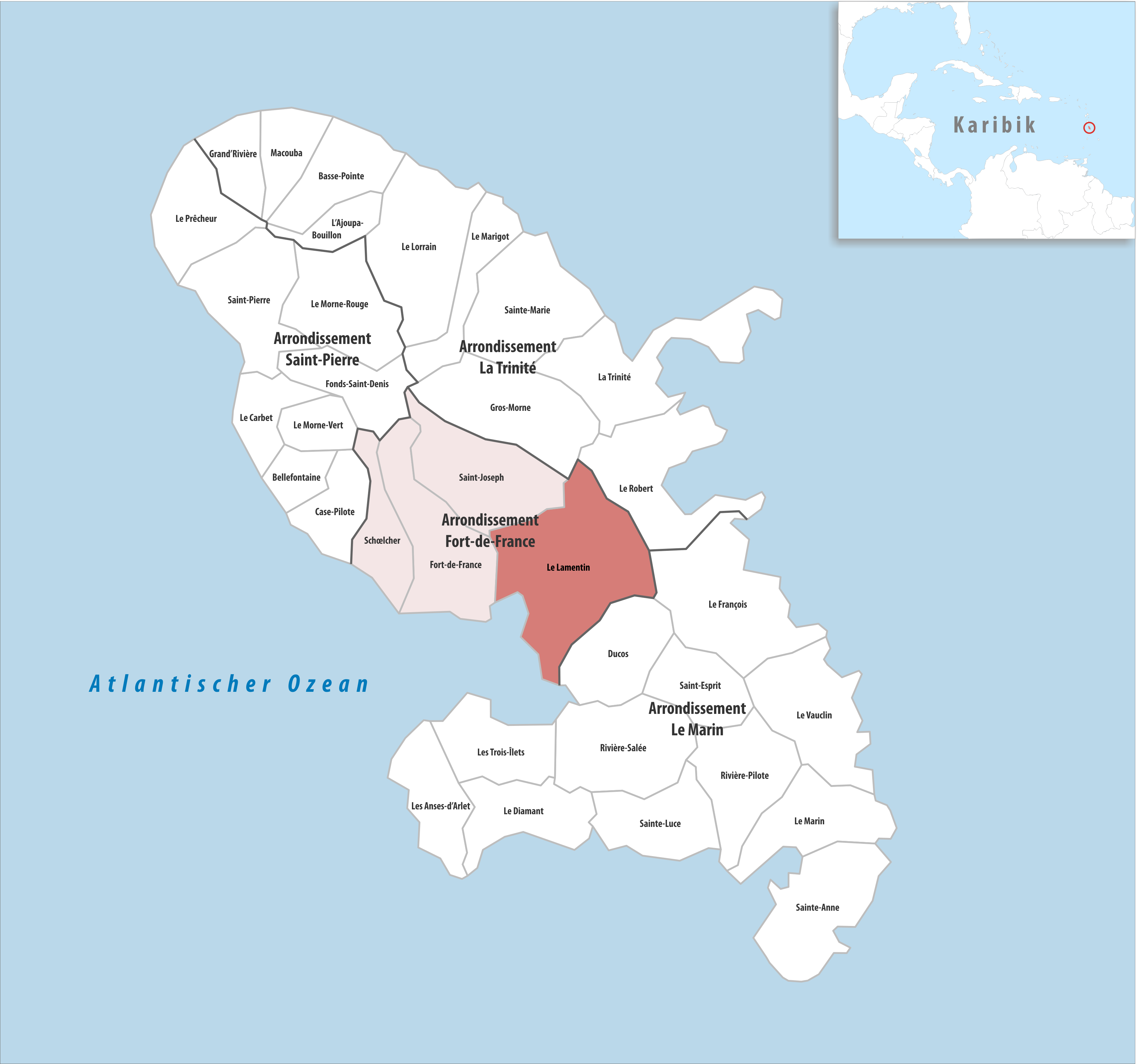
- Location of the commune (in red) within Martinique
- Location of Le Lamentin
- Coordinates: 14°36′N 61°00′W
- Country: France
- Overseas region and department: Martinique
- Arrondissement: Fort-de-France
- Intercommunality: CA Centre de la Martinique

Government
  - Mayor (2020–2026): David Zobda
- Area^{1}: 62.32 km^{2} (24.06 sq mi)
- Highest elevation: 363 m (1,191 ft)
- Lowest elevation: −10 m (−33 ft)
- Population (2023): 39,400
  - Density: 632/km^{2} (1,640/sq mi)
- Demonym: Lamentinois.e
- Time zone: UTC−04:00 (AST)
- INSEE/Postal code: 97213 /97232
- ^{1} French Land Register data, which excludes lakes, ponds, glaciers > 1 km^{2} (0.386 sq mi or 247 acres) and river estuaries.

Le Lamentin (French pronunciation: [lə lamɑ̃tɛ̃]; Martinican Creole: Lanmanten; lit. 'The Manatee') is a city and town, located in the French overseas department and region of Martinique. With its area of 62.32 km^{2}, it is the town with the largest area in Martinique. Le Lamentin, with close to 40,000 inhabitants, is the second most populated town of Martinique, after Fort-de-France. It is also the first industrial town and the heart of the island's economy.

== Geography ==
Le Lamentin is located in the island’s central lowlands within the arrondissement of Fort-de-France. It forms part of the urban area of the island’s capital and the wider metropolitan region.

The commune occupies a broad alluvial plain that was historically dominated by wetlands, swamps, and mangrove forests, much of which has since been drained and urbanised for residential, industrial, and transport infrastructure.

Le Lamentin is situated on the Bay of Fort-de-France and includes both coastal and riverine environments. It is traversed by the Lézarde River, the longest river in Martinique (approximately 36 km), which flows through the commune before reaching the bay.

== Climate ==
Le Lamentin has a tropical rainforest climate (Köppen climate classification Af), characterised by consistently high temperatures and heavy rainfall throughout the year.

The average annual temperature is 27.0 °C (80.6 °F), with minimal seasonal variation. Monthly mean temperatures range from 25.6 °C (78.1 °F) in February to 28.1 °C (82.6 °F) in August. Average daytime highs are typically between 29 °C (84 °F) and 32 °C (90 °F), while average lows range from 22 °C (72 °F) to 25 °C (77 °F).

Average annual precipitation is 2,056.6 mm (80.97 in), with rainfall distributed throughout the year. November is typically the wettest month, while slightly drier conditions occur between February and April. The commune records over 200 rainy days annually.

The highest temperature recorded was 35.4 °C (95.7 °F) on 7 October 2012, while the lowest was 14.1 °C (57.4 °F) on 25 December 1964.

Comparison of local Meteorological data with other cities in France
Town	Sunshine (hours/yr)	Rain (mm/yr)	Snow (days/yr)	Storm (days/yr)	Fog (days/yr)
National average	1,973	770	14	22	40
Le Lamentin	2,317.9	1,915.6	0	26.7	0.9
Paris	1,661	637	12	18	10
Nice	2,724	767	1	29	1
Strasbourg	1,693	665	29	29	56
Brest	1,605	1,211	7	12	75

Climate data for Le Lamentin (1991–2020 averages, extremes 1953–present)
Month	Jan	Feb	Mar	Apr	May	Jun	Jul	Aug	Sep	Oct	Nov	Dec	Year
Record high °C (°F)	32.1 (89.8)	32.9 (91.2)	34.4 (93.9)	34.1 (93.4)	33.7 (92.7)	33.7 (92.7)	32.8 (91.0)	34.2 (93.6)	35.2 (95.4)	35.4 (95.7)	34.1 (93.4)	32.1 (89.8)	35.4 (95.7)
Mean daily maximum °C (°F)	29.0 (84.2)	29.1 (84.4)	29.6 (85.3)	30.3 (86.5)	30.9 (87.6)	30.9 (87.6)	30.9 (87.6)	31.4 (88.5)	31.7 (89.1)	31.4 (88.5)	30.5 (86.9)	29.6 (85.3)	30.4 (86.7)
Daily mean °C (°F)	25.7 (78.3)	25.6 (78.1)	26.0 (78.8)	26.7 (80.1)	27.6 (81.7)	28.0 (82.4)	27.9 (82.2)	28.1 (82.6)	27.9 (82.2)	27.6 (81.7)	27.0 (80.6)	26.2 (79.2)	27.0 (80.6)
Mean daily minimum °C (°F)	22.3 (72.1)	22.1 (71.8)	22.4 (72.3)	23.1 (73.6)	24.3 (75.7)	25.0 (77.0)	25.0 (77.0)	24.7 (76.5)	24.1 (75.4)	23.8 (74.8)	23.5 (74.3)	22.8 (73.0)	23.6 (74.5)
Average rainfall mm (inches)	115.2 (4.54)	81.6 (3.21)	82.3 (3.24)	123.0 (4.84)	137.6 (5.42)	166.6 (6.56)	198.1 (7.80)	257.3 (10.13)	219.3 (8.63)	256.7 (10.11)	260.8 (10.27)	158.1 (6.22)	2,056.6 (80.97)
Source: Météo-France

== History ==
The area is part of the central alluvial plain of Martinique, originally composed of wetlands, mangroves, and seasonally flooded terrain. Prior to extensive development, it was sparsely populated compared with coastal settlements such as Fort-de-France and Saint-Pierre, due to its swampy conditions and vulnerability to flooding and waterborne disease.

The name of the commune is traditionally linked to the West Indian manatee (Trichechus manatus), which once inhabited the Lézarde River and surrounding coastal wetlands. The species, now extinct in the Lesser Antilles, is reflected in local toponymy and cultural heritage.

=== Colonial period and plantation economy ===
During the French colonial period, the Lamentin plain was progressively incorporated into the plantation economy. From the 18th century onwards, extensive wetland areas were drained and converted into agricultural land, particularly for sugarcane cultivation. This development was closely associated with the system of enslaved labour that structured the colonial economy in Martinique until the abolition of slavery in 1848.

Following abolition, the area underwent gradual agricultural restructuring, with the decline of large plantations and the emergence of smaller mixed farms. Sugarcane cultivation and agro-processing nevertheless remained significant into the late 19th and early 20th centuries.

=== 19th-century administrative formation ===
The commune was formally established in the 19th century during administrative reorganisation under French colonial governance. Settlement remained predominantly rural during this period, with dispersed habitation linked to agriculture and parish structures.

=== Early 20th-century development ===
In the early 20th century, the construction and improvement of road infrastructure strengthened links between the central plain and Fort-de-France, accelerating integration into the island’s emerging urban core.

=== Mid-20th century infrastructure and land transformation ===
From the mid-20th century, major hydraulic works were undertaken to manage flooding and improve land usability across the low-lying plain, enabling large-scale urban and industrial development. These interventions significantly reshaped the physical geography of the commune.

=== Airport development and modern economy ===
A key milestone in the commune’s modern development was the establishment and expansion of aviation infrastructure. The Lamentin airfield, developed during the 20th century, was progressively expanded after the Second World War to accommodate increasing civil aviation demand. It later became Martinique Aimé Césaire International Airport, the principal airport of the island.

From the 1960s onwards the town experienced rapid industrialisation and urbanisation, driven by its strategic location and transport infrastructure. Industrial zones, administrative services, and commercial areas developed extensively, transforming the commune into one of the principal economic centres of Martinique.

== Demography ==
The population of Le Lamentin has been recorded in successive censuses conducted by INSEE. Earlier figures exist for the area, but are not directly comparable with later data due to changes in administrative boundaries and census definitions over time.

Population of Le Lamentin
Year	Pop.	±%
1961	16,211	—
1967	18,553	+14.4%
1974	23,145	+24.8%
1982	26,367	+13.9%
1990	30,028	+13.9%
1999	35,460	+18.1%
2007	39,442	+11.2%
2012	39,700	+0.7%
2017	39,809	+0.3%
2023	39,400	−1.0%
Source: INSEE and SPLAF

== Economy ==
Le Lamentin is one of the principal economic centres of Martinique and forms part of the island’s main industrial and administrative hub within the urban area of Fort-de-France.

The commune has a strong tertiary sector and contains several industrial and commercial zones, including La Lézarde, La Jambette, Les Mangles Acajou, Les Hauts de Californie, Place d’Armes, Lareinty, and Manhity.

It also hosts major retail infrastructure, including the La Galleria and Place d’Armes shopping centres.

Industrial activity includes the SARA petroleum refinery (Société Anonyme de la Raffinerie des Antilles), located within the commune and supplying fuel to Martinique and other French Antilles territories.

Le Lamentin is also an important administrative centre, hosting regional offices of organisations such as the Caisse Générale de Sécurité Sociale (CGSS), the Caisse d’Allocations Familiales (CAF), and the Chambre d’Agriculture de la Martinique.

=== Transport ===
Le Lamentin is the main transport hub of Martinique. It is home to Martinique Aimé Césaire International Airport, the island’s principal airport. In 2024, the airport handled approximately 1.86 million passengers.

The commune is also a key road transport node, as major national roads including the RN1 and RN5 pass through its territory, linking Fort-de-France with the southern and northern parts of the island.

Due to its central location within the urban area of Fort-de-France, Le Lamentin hosts a large proportion of the island’s logistics and distribution infrastructure, including freight services connected to the airport and industrial zones.

== Twin towns ==
Le Lamentin is twinned with:

- Santiago de Cuba, Cuba
- Treichville, Côte d'Ivoire

== See also ==
- Communes of the Martinique department
