= Arrondissement of La Trinité =

Coordinates: 14°44′16″N 60°57′47″W

La Trinité
- Arrondissement
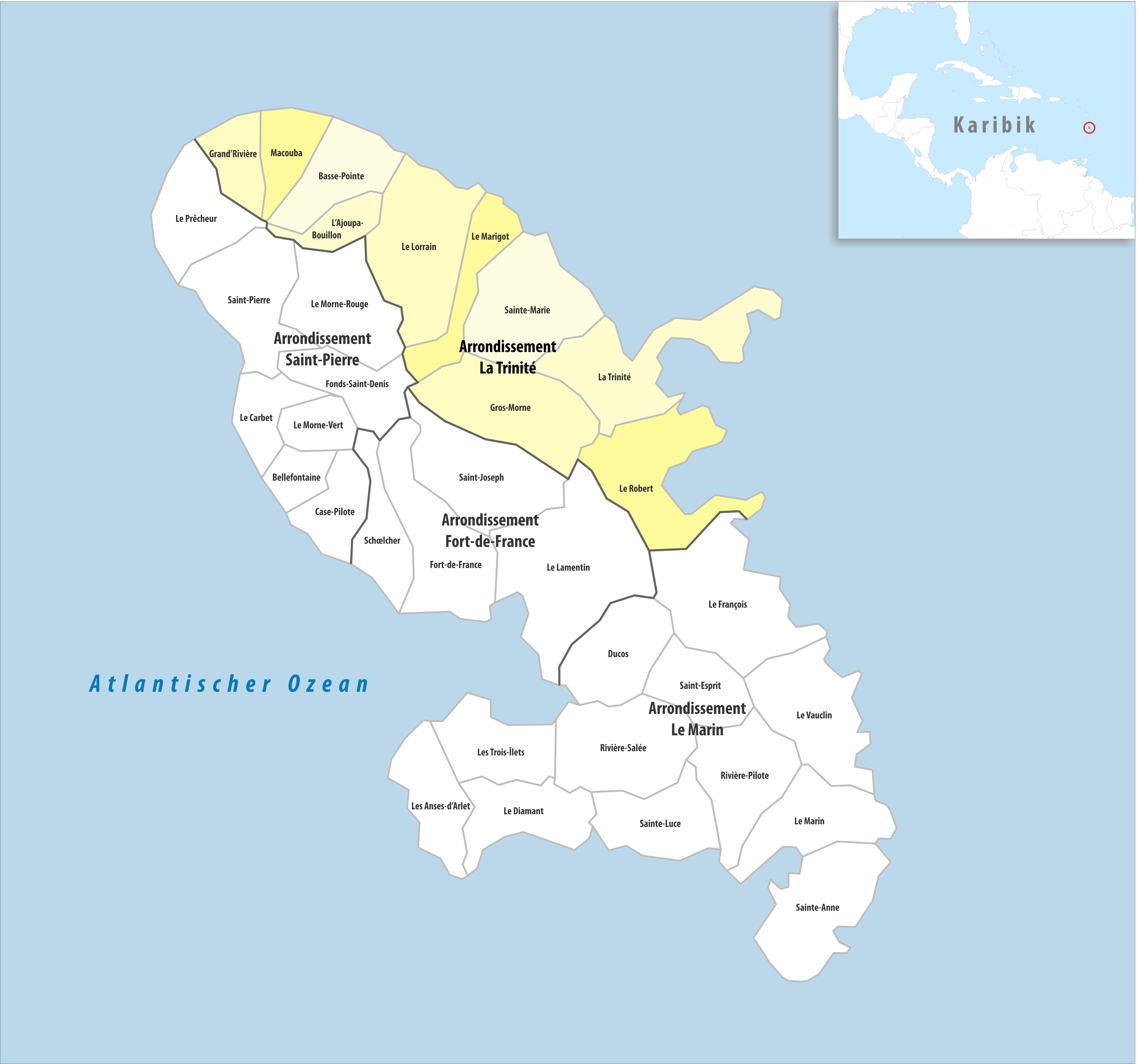
- Location within the region Martinique
- Country: France
- Overseas region and department: Martinique{{{region}}}
- No. of communes: {{{nbcomm}}}
- Area: 337.6 km^{2} (130.3 sq mi)
- Population (2023): 72,895
  - Density: 215.9/km^{2} (559.2/sq mi)
- INSEE code: 9722

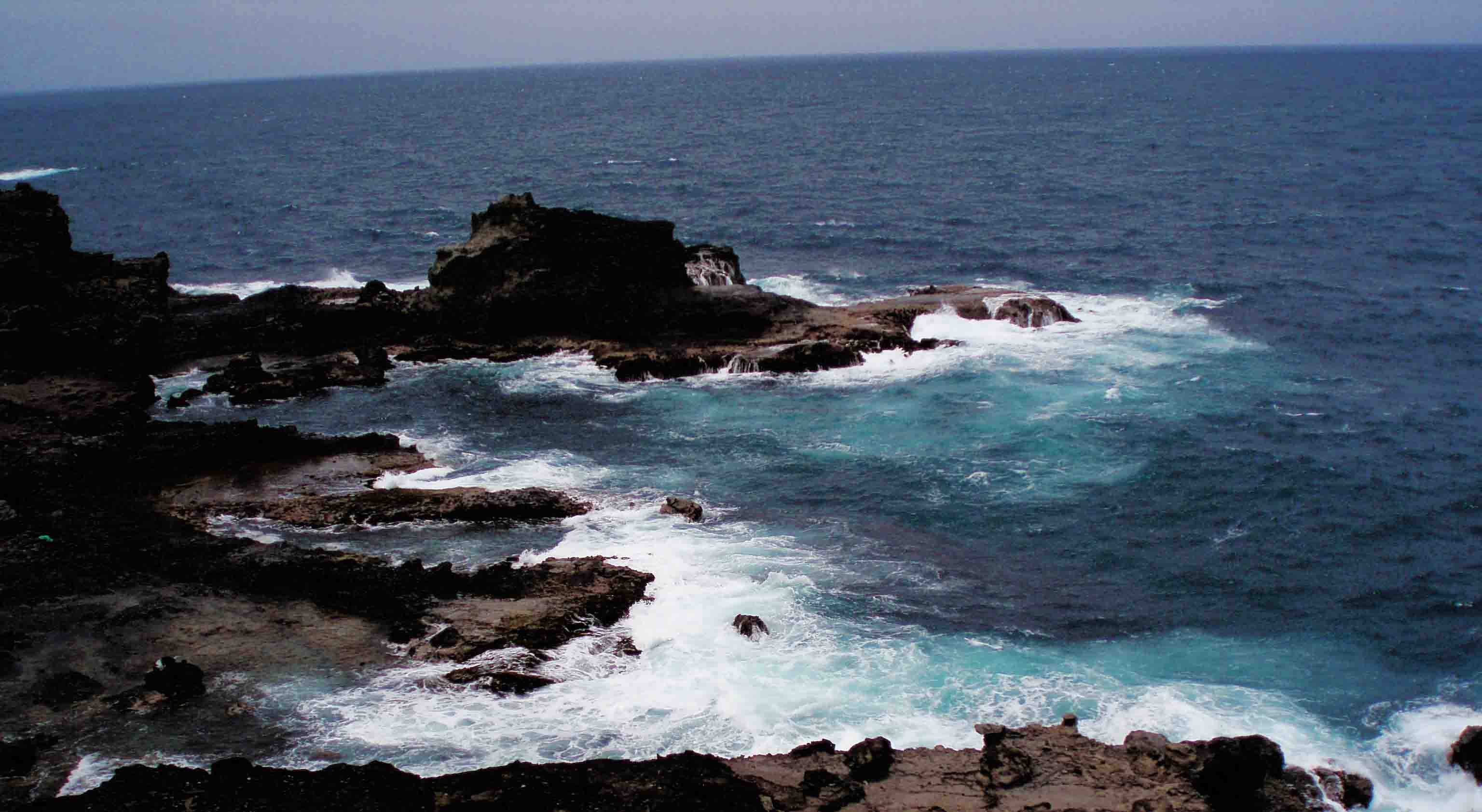
The Caravelle peninsula in La Trinité

The arrondissement of La Trinité (French: arrondissement de La Trinité) is an arrondissement in the French overseas region and department of Martinique. It has 10 communes. Its population is 73,291 (2021), and its area is 337.6 km^{2} (130.3 sq mi).

== Composition ==
The communes of the arrondissement of La Trinité, and their INSEE codes, are:

1. L'Ajoupa-Bouillon (97201)
2. Basse-Pointe (97203)
3. Grand'Rivière (97211)
4. Gros-Morne (97212)
5. Le Lorrain (97214)
6. Macouba (97215)
7. Le Marigot (97216)
8. Le Robert (97222)
9. Sainte-Marie (97228)
10. La Trinité (97230)

== History ==
The arrondissement of La Trinité, containing 10 communes that were previously part of the arrondissement of Fort-de-France, was created in 1965.

Before 2015, the arrondissements of Martinique were subdivided into cantons. The cantons of the arrondissement of La Trinité were, as of January 2015:

1. L'Ajoupa-Bouillon
2. Basse-Pointe
3. Gros-Morne
4. Le Lorrain
5. Macouba
6. Le Marigot
7. Le Robert 1st Canton Sud
8. Le Robert 2nd Canton Nord
9. Sainte-Marie 1st Canton Nord
10. Sainte-Marie 2nd Canton Sud
11. La Trinité
