= List of populated places in Martinique =

This list is intended to be a full A–Z list of settlements and neighborhoods in the Caribbean island of Martinique:

- Abandonne
- Abondance
- Absalon
- Acajou
- Adelaide Maillet
- Adinet
- Alma
- Anse Figuiers
- Anse Madame
- Augrain
- Bac
- Balata
- Balata-Tourtet
- Bambous
- Bareto
- Barington
- Barriere-la-Croix
- Basse-Pointe
- Baudelle
- Beauchamp
- Beauregard
- Becouya
- Bel-Air
- Bel Event
- Belfort
- Bellay
- Belle Ame
- Belle Etoile (14°46'0"N 60°59'0"W)
- Belle Etoile (14°29'0"N 60°50'0"W)
- Bellefontaine
- Belle Languette
- Bellevue (14°'0"N 61°0'0"W)
- Bellevue (14°28'0"N 60°56'0"W)
- Bernard
- Bezaudin
- Birot
- Bois Carré
- Bois d'Inde
- Bois du Parc
- Bois la Charles
- Bois Lezards
- Bois Neuf (14°'0"N 60°57'0"W)
- Bois Neuf (14°38'0"N 61°2'0"W)
- Bois-Neuf (14°35'0"N 60°56'0"W)
- Bois Neuf (14°28'0"N 60°50'0"W)
- Bois Soldat
- Bois Zombi
- Bonneau
- Bonneville
- Bon Repos
- Borel
- Bossou
- Boucan
- Boutaud
- Brevette
- Brin d'Amour
- Cadette
- Cafe
- Californie
- Camee
- Canton Suisse
- Cap Cabaret
- Cap Chevalier
- Carabin
- Caritan
- Case Navire
- Case-Pilote
- Cedalise
- Chambort
- Champfleury
- Champ Flore
- Chapelle Villarson
- Chateauboeuf
- Château Gaillard
- Chertine
- Chevalier
- Cite Dillon
- Cite Petit Manoir
- Clairiere
- Cluny
- Concorde
- Concorde-Leyritz
- Coridon
- Corps de Garde
- Croisée Decius
- Croisée Manioc
- Croisée Palmiste
- Croisée Soldat
- Croix Blanche
- Croix Odilon
- Daubert
- Delivry
- Demare
- Derriere-Bois
- Derriere Morne
- Desert
- Desforts
- Desmarinieres
- Desruisseaux
- Deux Choux
- Diaka
- Dominant
- Dominante
- Duchène
- Ducos
- Duhamelin
- Dumaine (14°42'0"N 61°'0"W)
- Dumaine (14°35'0"N 60°5'0"W)
- Duquesne
- Eudorcait
- Fantaisie
- Faubourg Schoelcher
- Ferme Saint-Jacques
- Ferre
- Fleury
- Floréal
- Fond Abattoir
- Fond Bernier
- Fond Boucher
- Fond Bourlet
- Fond Cacao
- Fond Capot
- Fond Collat
- Fond Fleury
- Fond-Gens-Libres (14°49'0"N 61°'0"W)
- Fond Gens Libres (14°29'0"N 60°5'0"W)
- Fond Giromond
- Fond Grande Anse
- Fond Hubert
- Fond-Lahaye
- Fond Marie-Reine
- Fond Mascret
- Fond Masson
- Fond Moustiques
- Fond Nicolas
- Fond Nigaud
- Fond Panier
- Fond Repos
- Fond Rose
- Fond-Saint-Denis
- Fond Saint-Jacques
- Fonds Boheme
- Fonds Brules
- Fond-Zombi
- Fontaine de Moutte
- Fort-de-France
- Four a Chaux (14°39'0"N 60°57'0"W)
- Four a Chaux (14°36'0"N 61°0'0"W)
- Gabourin
- Gallochat
- Garanne
- Gerbault (14°'0"N 60°57'0"W)
- Gerbault (14°36'0"N 61°'0"W)
- Glotin
- Gondeau
- Gondeau-Saint-Joseph
- Grand-Court
- Grande Anse (14°42'0"N 61°'0"W)
- Grande Anse (14°30'0"N 61°5'0"W)
- Grande Savane
- Grand' Riviere
- Gros-Morne
- Guenot
- Guinée-Fleury
- Hauteurs Bourdon
- Hauteurs Dumas
- Hauteurs Riviere Roche
- Hyacinthe
- Jean-Baptiste
- Jeanne d'Arc
- Josseaud
- La Bateliere
- La Batterie
- La Baume
- La Beleme
- La Berry
- La Boissiere
- La Bonnie
- La Californie
- La Canelle
- La Carrière
- La Casse
- La Cesaire
- La Chapelle
- La Chopotte
- La Citerne
- La Debuc
- La Demarche
- La Dessaint
- La Duprey
- La Durand
- La Farelle
- La Favorite
- La Ferme Saint-Jacques
- La Fontenay
- La Fouquette
- La Haut (14°38'0"N 60°57'0"W)
- La-Haut (14°32'0"N 60°57'0"W)
- La Huvet
- L'Ajoupa-Bouillon
- Lajus
- La Manzo
- La Massel
- La Mauny
- La Médaille
- La Moise
- La Monnerot
- L'Anse Caffar
- L'Anse Mitan
- L'Anse Noire
- La Pagerie
- La Plaine
- La Regale
- La Renée
- La Richard
- La Salette
- La Source
- La Suffrin
- La Suin
- La Tocnay
- La Tracée
- La Tranchée
- La Trinité
- La Vatable
- La Vierge (14°42'0"N 61°'0"W)
- La Vierge (14°28'0"N 60°52'0"W)
- Lazaret
- Le Cap
- Le Carbet
- Le Centre
- Le Coin
- Le Diamant
- Le François
- Le Lamentin
- Le Lorrain
- Le Marin
- Le Morne aux Boeufs
- Le Morne des Olives
- Le Morne Rouge
- Le Morne-Vert
- Le Mouillage
- L'Enclos
- Lepinay
- Le Poteau
- Le Prêcheur
- L'Ermitage
- L'Ermitage
- Lero
- Le Robert
- Les Abymes
- Le Saint-Esprit
- Les Anses-d'Arlets
- Les Boucaniers
- Les Coteaux
- Lescouet
- Les Deux-Terres
- Les Flamboyants
- L'Esperance
- Les Quatre Chemins
- Lestrade
- Les Trois-Ilets
- Les Trois Ponts
- Le Trou
- Le Vauclin
- Lheureux
- Long-Bois (14°40'0"N 61°'0"W)
- Long Bois (14°38'0"N 61°0'0"W)
- Lourdes (14°'0"N 60°58'0"W)
- Lourdes (14°29'0"N 60°5'0"W)
- Lunette-Bouille
- Macedoine
- Macouba
- Macre
- Malevaut
- Mare Capron
- Mare Poirier
- Marie Noire
- Marigot
- Maxime
- Maximin
- Mayol
- Médecin
- Mondesir (14°28'0"N 60°52'0"W)
- Mondesir (14°26'0"N 60°52'0"W)
- Mondesir-Pointe Sable
- Monesie
- Montgerald
- Montjoly
- Montravail
- Morne Baguidi
- Morne-Balai
- Morne Baldara
- Morne Bel
- Morne Blanc
- Morne Bois
- Morne Capot
- Morne Ceron
- Morne Congo
- Morne Courbaril (14°38'0"N 60°55'0"W)
- Morne Courbaril (14°29'0"N 60°52'0"W)
- Morne des Esses
- Morne Flambeau
- Morne Honore
- Morne la Valeur
- Morne Pavillon (14°45'0"N 60°55'0"W)
- Morne Pavillon (14°37'0"N 60°57'0"W)
- Morne-Pichevin
- Morne Pitault
- Morne Poirier (14°'0"N 60°59'0"W)
- Morne Poirier (14°40'0"N 61°'0"W)
- Morne Pois
- Morne Rouge
- Morne Serpent
- Morne Sulpice
- Morne Vallon
- Morne Vent
- Morne Vente
- Morne-Vert (14°42'0"N 61°9'0"W)
- Morne Vert (14°35'0"N 60°57'0"W)
- Pain de Sucre
- Palmiste
- Parnasse
- Pelletier
- Perou
- Petit Bourg
- Petit Bresil
- Petit Campèche
- Petite Anse
- Petite Lezarde
- Petite Rivière
- Petite Rivière Salee
- Petite Savane
- Petit Morne
- Petit Paradis
- Petit Sable
- Petit Trou
- Placide
- Plaisable
- Plateau-Didier
- Plateforme
- Pointe Athanase
- Pointe Fort
- Pointe Jean-Claude
- Pointe la Mare
- Pointe Larose
- Poirer
- Poirier (14°27'0"N 60°5'0"W)
- Poirier (14°27'0"N 60°55'0"W)
- Poiriers
- Pomare
- Pomponne
- Pont de Chaînes
- Poste Colon
- Presqu'ile
- Proprete
- Propriete Poulet
- Puyferrat
- Quartier Abricot
- Quartier Anse Azerot
- Quartier Bac
- Quartier Balata
- Quartier Bas Ceron
- Quartier Beaujolais
- Quartier Beauregard
- Quartier Beauvallon
- Quartier Beco
- Quartier Bedzy
- Quartier Bellevue (14°36'0"N 61°6'0"W)
- Quartier Bellevue (14°32'0"N 60°5'0"W)
- Quartier Bocage
- Quartier Bon Air
- Quartier Bonnain
- Quartier Boue
- Quartier Chere Epice
- Quartier Chevre
- Quartier Cocoyer
- Quartier Coulee d'Or
- Quartier Courbaril (14°'0"N 61°2'0"W)
- Quartier Courbaril (14°32'0"N 60°57'0"W)
- Quartier Cyrille
- Quartier Dabadie
- Quartier de la T. S. F.
- Quartier de l'Ex-voto
- Quartier de l'Orangerie
- Quartier Desbrosses
- Quartier Deschamps
- Quartier Descossieres
- Quartier Desmartinieres
- Quartier des Pitons
- Quartier du Fort
- Quartier du Morne Valentin
- Quartier Firmin
- Quartier Fond Guillet
- Quartier Fond Mulatre
- Quartier Fonds Zamy
- Quartier Galette
- Quartier Gillot
- Quartier Glotin
- Quartier Grand Bassin
- Quartier Grosan
- Quartier Humbert
- Quartier la Beauville
- Quartier la Dessaint
- Quartier la Felix
- Quartier la Fontaine
- Quartier l'Allée
- Quartier la Nau
- Quartier la Sabine
- Quartier Lecomte
- Quartier Lelubois
- Quartier Lowinsky
- Quartier Lucon
- Quartier Monplaisir
- Quartier Monsieur
- Quartier Morne Acajou
- Quartier Morne a Roche
- Quartier Morne Calebasse
- Quartier Morne Carrette
- Quartier Morne Covin
- Quartier Morne Mignolle
- Quartier Morne Piton
- Quartier Morne Theodore
- Quartier Palmene
- Quartier Pays Mele
- Quartier Perou
- Quartier Petit Paradis
- Quartier Piton
- Quartier Pitons
- Quartier Plateau Tiberge
- Quartier Poix Doux Bocage
- Quartier Prefontaine
- Quartier Rabuchon
- Quartier Ravine
- Quartier Rivière Bambous
- Quartier Rivière Monsieur (14°40'0"N 61°'0"W)
- Quartier Rivière Monsieur (14°37'0"N 61°'0"W)
- Quartier Rivière Pomme
- Quartier Rivière Roche
- Quartier Roches Carrées
- Quartier Rollin
- Quartier Sainte-Catherine
- Quartiers Anse a l'Ane
- Quartier Semaine
- Quartier Vente
- Quartier Vert-Pré
- Rabat-Joie
- Raisin
- Rateau
- Ravine Acajou
- Ravine Braie
- Ravine Touza
- Ravine Vilaine
- Reculée
- Redoute
- Regale
- Regale-de-Saint-Esprit
- Rivière
- Rivière Cacao
- Rivière Calecon
- Rivière l'Or
- Rivière-Pilote
- Rivière-Salée
- Rodon
- Rousseau
- Rue Paille
- Saingaule
- Saint-Aroman
- Sainte-Anne
- Sainte-Luce
- Sainte-Marie
- Sainte-Thérèse
- Saint-Joseph
- Saint-Maurice
- Saint-Pierre (14°'0"N 61°10'0"W)
- Saint-Pierre (14°35'0"N 60°56'0"W)
- Saint-Roche
- Saint-Vincent
- Sans Pareil
- Sarcelle
- Sarraut
- Savane Petit
- Schœlcher
- Serail
- Sinai
- Sucrerie
- Tartane
- Taupinière
- Terres Sainville
- Terreville
- Tourtet
- Touza
- Trois-Rivières
- Trou Grec
- Trou Terre
- Union
- Valatte
- Val d'Or
- Verrier
- Vert-Pré
- Vieille Terre
- Volga-Plage
- Voltaire
- Zabeth
- Zobeide
