= Canton of Le Carbet =

Canton of Saint-Pierre, Martinique

Coordinates: 14.7108°N 61.1811°W

The Canton of Le Carbet is a former canton in the Arrondissement of Saint-Pierre on Martinique. It had 5,617 inhabitants (2012). It was disbanded in 2015. The canton comprised the communes of Le Carbet and Le Morne-Vert.
