= Canton of Case-Pilote-Bellefontaine =

Coordinates: 14.6428°N 61.1386°W

The Canton of Case-Pilote-Bellefontaine is a former canton in the Arrondissement of Saint-Pierre on Martinique. It had 5,977 inhabitants (2012). It was disbanded in 2015. The canton comprised the communes of Case-Pilote and Bellefontaine.
