= Oedipus (Dryden play) =

Restoration tragedy by Dryden and Lee

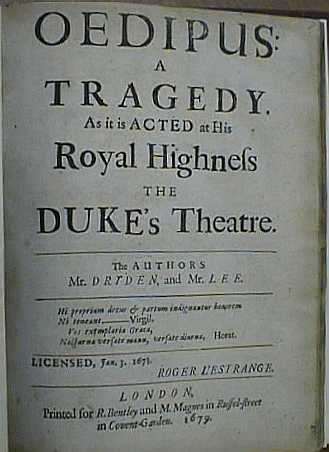
Title page of Oedipus: A Tragedy (1679).

The heroic drama Oedipus: A Tragedy, is an adaptation of Sophocles' Oedipus Rex, written by John Dryden and Nathaniel Lee. After being licensed in 1678 and published in 1679, it became a huge success on stage during the Restoration period.

== Career and reputation ==
Oedipus, a Tragedy may today have an unintended comic effect, given the bloodthirsty ending of the drama. In past centuries, however, there was a wide range of views, ranging from enthusiasm to condemnation.

"Celebratur Oedipus…" In 1700, the journal "Acta Eruditorum", published in Leipzig, celebrated Dryden and Lee's adaptation of Oedipus. Along with All for Love, Oedipus, a Tragedy was regarded as the climax of Dryden's dramatic work. Charles Gildon, however, who revised many of Gerard Langbaine's articles in the manual on English Drama An Account of the English Dramatick Poets, harshly criticised Oedipus, a Tragedy, saying:

The most understanding Judges wish they [i.e. Dryden/Lee] had followed Sophocles yet closer, it had then been the best of our Modern Plays, as 'tis of the Ancients: but as it is, they have destroyed the Character of Oedipus…

It remains uncertain which parts of this play were written by Dryden and by Lee. According to The London Stage, Dryden wrote the first two acts, Lee the last three. In his introduction to Oedipus, a Tragedy of 1808, Walter Scott says that the first and the third acts were wholly written by Dryden, maintaining a decided superiority over the rest of the piece. Since there are "many excellent passages through Lee's scenes" and "the tragedy has the appearance of general consistence and uniformity", Scott supposes that the whole play was corrected by Dryden afterwards.

Oedipus, a Tragedy was licensed on 3 January 1678 by Roger L'Estrange and published in 1679 by R. Bentley and M. Magnes in Russel Street in Covent Garden. Bentley and Magnes were already Lee's publishers. Financial considerations were probably the motivation for Dryden's decision to change publishers at this time, ending his long association with Henry Herringman, which dated back to the days before the Restoration. Bentley and Magnes also printed The Kind Keeper, though Dryden complained that they had done so in his absence and without his supervision. With his next play, Troilus and Cressida, he began an association with Jacob Tonson that would last the rest of his life. It remains uncertain when exactly the tragedy was performed on stage for the first time; but it may have been the first new play of the season: The Prologue refers to it as "the first Play bury´d since the Wollen Act," the Act going into effect on 1 Aug 1678.

The tragedy was performed by the Duke's Company in London, surprisingly not by the King's Company, with whom Dryden had a contract to produce three plays a year from 1668 until 1683. Dryden produced his plays at a steady rate, though not three a year: there were twenty-two plays between 1663 and 1683. The King's Company, who anticipated a huge success from the "combined talents of Dryden and Lee", complained about the fact that the play Oedipus, a Tragedy, was given to the Duke's Company, and not to them.

Mr Dryden has now jointly with Mr. Lee (who was in Pension with us to the last day of our Playing, & shall continue) Written a play call´d AEdipus, and given it to the Duke's Company, contrary to his said agreemt [the contract of 1668], his promise [allegedly made after they granted him a third day for All for Love], and all gratitude [,] to the great prejudice and almost undoing of the Company, They being the only Poets remaining to us.

But this complaint went unheeded, and the scenic complexity of the play shows that Dryden and Lee originally intended it for the Duke's Theatre. In 1671, the Duke's Company moved to a new theatre at Dorset Garden which had arrangements for even more elaborate scenic effects, their mastery of spectacle was never matched by the King's Company, particularly after a fire destroyed the Theatre Royal in 1672. The replacement building, designed by Wren, was only a "Plain Built House". Dryden's divorce from the King's players was now complete. During the remaining years of the company, which finally merged with the Duke's men in 1682, he wrote a number of prologues for his old associates, but he was probably paid a set fee for those. For the rest of his plays, Dryden was now paid like other playwrights, with the profits of the third performance on stage.

Dryden's share of the third day's proceeds from Oedipus, which he had to divide with Lee, probably amounted to no more than 50 pound, but any payment was welcome under the circumstances.

The amount of 50 pounds is considered to be a meagre wage here for a popular playwright. In comparison to the earnings of contemporary skilled workers and other professions, however, one might assume that Dryden received an appropriate if not overly generous share of money. The premiere and the following performances of this drama on stage were highly successful. The "bombastic violence of Oedipus", as Kinsley puts it, was a "scandalous success, with the Bettertons playing Oedipus and Jocasta."

This play was Admirably well Acted; especially the Parts of Oedipus and Jocasta: One by Mr Betterton, the other by Mrs Betterton; it took prodigiously being Acted 10 Days together.

Dryden's All for Love, by contrast, despite its high place in the estimation both of Dryden and of his modern critics, seems to have had much less general appeal. Published early in 1678, a few months after its first stage presentation, it was only twice reprinted in Dryden's lifetime. Oedipus, a Tragedy, by contrast, reached six editions by 1701 and ten editions by 1734. The heroic drama by Dryden and Lee remained popular for a long period of time and was constantly performed on stage, almost every year between 1678 and 1710. After the premiere, it was restaged in the following years: 1686, 1692, 1696, 1698, 1702, 1703, and between 1705 and 1710 almost every year. The performance of Thursday 13, October 1692, is especially remarkable:

On Thursday last was acted the tragedy of Oedipus king of Thebes at the theater, where Sandford [as Creon] and Powell [as Adrastus] acting their parts together, the former by mistake of a sharp dagger for one that runs the blade into the handle, stab'd the other 3 inches deep: said the wound is mortal.

The effect of this 'accident' on the audience attending the play is impossible to reconstruct. Such incidents might have increased the popularity of the play to a certain extent or might have satisfied the audience's cravings for sensation.

There must have been a change in the reputation of the drama on stage in the late 18th and early 19th century. In his introduction to Oedipus, a Tragedy, written in 1808, Scott considers the performance of the play to be unbearable for the audience about thirty years before, because it was considered to be too bloodthirsty.

It is certain, that, when the play was revived about thirty years ago, the audience were unable to support it to an end; the boxes being all emptied before the third act was concluded. Among all our English plays, there is none more determinedly bloody than Oedipus, in its progress and conclusion. The entrance of the unfortunate king, with his eyes torn from their sockets, is too disgusting for representation.

== Concept and composition ==
=== Underlying concept ===
Oedipus Rex was originally written by Sophocles in 430 BC, and later on the subject was adapted by Seneca and Corneille. In the preface to Oedipus, a Tragedy, Dryden refers to these authors and comments on their works. By doing so, he reveals his concept of Oedipus, a Tragedy, and explains why he thinks that the Latin and French adaptions of the drama were inferior to the original work by Sophocles.

In our Age, Corneille has attempted it, and it appears by his Preface, with great success: But a judicious Reader will easily observe, how much the Copy is inferiour to the Original.

Dryden disapproves of the way Corneille has treated the subject, but not the subplot – a love story involving Theseus and Dirce: in Oedipus, a Tragedy, Dryden himself uses a love story as subplot. According to Dryden, however, the French dramatist failed to create a heroic Oedipus. Instead of showing Oedipus as a just and merciful monarch, Corneille attaches only negative traits to Oedipus. The love story involving Theseus and Dirce gets too much attention and is put into the centre of his work.

…if he desir'd that Oedipus should be pitied, he shou'd have made him a better man. He forgot that Sophocles had taken care to shew him in his first entrance, a just, a merciful, a successful, a Religious Prince, and in short, a Father of his Country: instead of these, he has drawn him a suspicious, designing, more anxious of keeping the Theban Crown, than solicitous for the safety of his People: Hector'd by Theseus, contemn'd by Dirce, and scarce maintaining a second part in his own Tragedie…"

Dryden criticises Seneca's adaptation of the drama for lacking any naturalness of emotion and blames the Latin author for using artificial language, and as a consequence the lack of effects on stage:

Seneca […] is always running after pompous expression, pointed sentences, and Philosophical notions, more proper for the Study than the Stage: The French-man follow’d a wrong scent; and the Roman was absolutely at cold Hunting.

Dryden disapproves of the fact that Seneca has failed to introduce new aspects, except one: the scene when Lajus's ghost is called and appears on stage, which Dryden and Lee implement in their adaptation.

Seneca supply'd us with no new hint, but only a Relation which he makes of his Tiresias raising the Ghost of Lajus: which is here perform'd in view of the Audience…

Sophocles's Oedipus is praised and considered "the most celebrated piece of all Antiquity" by Dryden. The Greek author, who was

not only of the greatest Wit, but one of the greatest Men in Athens, made it for the Stage at the Publick Cost, and that it had the reputation of being his Masterpiece, not only amongst the Seven of his which are still remaining, but of the greater Number which are perish'd.

Since Sophocles is "admirable every where", Dryden and Lee claim to follow the Greek author as closely as they can. Dryden points out the compositional differences, saying:

…the Athenian Theater, (whether more perfect than ours is not now disputed) had a perfection differing from ours.

Dryden summarises the distinctive features of Greek theatre. A Greek tragedy is composed of three acts, each act generally comprising one scene "… (or two at most) which manage the business of the Play." The three unities are distinctive features of the Athenian theatre. What Dryden disapproves of in Greek theatre is only that the "principal person" appears constantly throughout the plot of a play, "but the inferiour parts seldome above once in the whole Tragedie."

Dryden/Lee's adaptation of Oedipus extends Sophocles's plot in two respects: by adding two further acts to the play and introducing a subplot with secondary characters, namely the love story of Eurydice and Adrastus. In the preface of the play, Dryden justifies the subplot as a necessary gesture towards English "Custom":

The conduct of our Stage is much more difficult, where we are oblig´d never to lose any considerable character which we have once presented. Custom likewise has obtain´d, that we must form an under-plot of second Persons, which must be depending on the first, and their by-walks must be like those in a Labyrinth, which all of 'em lead into the great Parterre: or like so many several lodging Chambers, which have their out-lets into the same Gallery.

Dryden compares the subplot of Oedipus, a Tragedy with "by-walks" in a "Labyrinth" that lead into the "great Parterre". Architectural metaphors are generally applied by Dryden to designate parts of a play. In the construction of a play, the playwright is the "master-workman" who needs "many subordinate hands, many tools to his assistance", including "history, geography, or moral philosophy." The plot is the base of the building, the characters and their manners the sides of it. All parts must be fitted properly to the whole; every part is neatly tied in.

== In comparison with Sophocles's Oedipus ==
Oedipus, a Tragedy was based on Sophocles's Oedipus, but the original drama was crucially changed in several respects.

=== Design of sub-plots and intrigues ===
Dryden and Lee add a subplot of secondary characters – a love story about Adrastus, prince of Argos, and Eurydice, Oedipus' daughter. Unlike Corneille, Dryden and Lee put the dramatic love story of Oedipus and Jocasta in the centre of the dramatic plot. But also the main characters appearing in both versions – Oedipus and Creon – are presented differently.

Sophocles designs his Oedipus as a just and merciful monarch, determined to rescue his kingdom from the dreadful disease. For this, he must investigate the murder of Lajus, the former king of Thebes. Although the blind prophet Tiresias explicitly tells Oedipus at the beginning of the play that he is the cause of the plague, Oedipus at first does not understand. Instead he accuses Tiresias of conspiring with Creon, Jocasta's brother, to overthrow him. In the meantime, Oedipus reveals the tyrant sides to his character. Oedipus demands strict obedience under any circumstances.

Creon. And if thy mind is darkened…?
Oedip. Still obey!
Creon. Not to a tyrant ruler.
Oedip. On my country! (Act I, p. 11)

Sophocles presents Creon as a just character. His only intention is to seek the truth on behalf of the Thebans to free them from the disease. He does not intend de-throne Oedipus on his own behalf; the burden of being a king would be too demanding for him and he would be rather afraid of taking on all responsibility for the country alone.

Creon. My mind, retaining reason, ne’er could act
The villain’s part. I was not born to love such thoughts myself…. (Act I, p. 11)

In Dryden/Lee's adaptation, the main characters are designed differently. According to Brunkhorst, Oedipus is presented as the ideal ruler of a country. Right upon his introduction, Oedipus returns from a battle between Thebes and Argos as the successful victor. The monarch has already managed to rescue the Thebans twice: not only did he manage to solve the Sphinx's riddle, but he also fought successfully against the rival kingdom Argos and captured prince Adrastus. The monarch turns out to be merciful, when he releases Adrastus, his former enemy, from prison. Despite all his personal doubts, Oedipus keeps the position as an omnipotent and just king throughout the play. As a public person, Oedipus appears self-confident; as a private person, however, he is full of desperation and insecurity. Oedipus is being haunted by dark forebodings and nightmares until he finally resigns in Act IV:

All that the hardest temper’d weather’d flesh,
With fiercest humane Spirit inspir’d, can dare
Or do, I dare; but, oh you Pow’rs, this was
By infinite degrees too much for man. (Act II, Scene I) If not otherwise stated, the following quotations are taken from Oedipus, a Tragedy, 1769.

Dryden and Lee present Creon as Oedipus's counterpart. He, as the villain, is deceitful, treacherous and scheming. He intends to depose Oedipus and become the only ruler of his country. To gain the throne, Creon does not hesitate to accuse his niece Eurydice, whom he desires, of murder.

O Beauty! […] I must accuse thee! […] The first of Lajus blood Gave him his Death. Is there a Prince before her? Then she is faultless. (Act II, p. 24)

Adrastus, who genuinely loves Eurydice, joins in and tries to protect her, saying

Touch not Euridice, by all the Gods, As you would save your Thebes, but take my life (Act II, p. 24)

Creon tries hard to drive a wedge between the young couple, Adrastus and Eurydice. If Adrastus accused her of murdering Lajus, he could escape death.

Proclaim your innocence, Accuse the Princess (Act III, p. 35)

At the end of the fifth act, Creon's calculating and resentful character shows up again: If Eurydice is not willing to marry him, she has to die.

Euridice shall dye, or be my Bride (Act V, p. 66)

Such constant scheming and intriguing by Creon is missing in Sophocles's Oedipus.

=== Shift of compassion for the hero ===
With prince Adrastus, Dryden designs a far more positive hero than Oedipus, who is guilty of murder. The prince of Argos genuinely loves Eurydice and does not hesitate to accuse himself of killing Lajus to rescue her, even if he puts his own life at risk. Like Adrastus, Eurydice is presented with exclusively positive traits. Before marrying Creon, she would prefer to die. As a courageous woman, she is not even afraid of death.

Death only can be dreadful to the bad: To innocence, 'tis like a bug-bear dress’d To fright’n Children; pull but off his Masque And he’ll appear a friend. (Act III, p. 32)

Not even death can divide the strong and genuine love of the young couple:

For death shall ne’re divide us: death, what’s death! (Act III, p. 32)

In act V, Creon eventually kills his niece before Adrastus' eyes. Adrastus immediately stabs Creon, but he himself is killed by Creon's soldiers. Even his last words and thoughts are dedicated to Eurydice:

She’s gone […] They talk of Heroes, and Celestial Beauties, And wondrous pleasures in the other World; Let me but find her there, I ask no more. (Act V, p. 76)

The love story of the young couple ends tragically; but not even death can divide their genuine love for each other. Instead of feeling pity for Oedipus and Jocasta, who both commit suicide in the end, it is the fate of Adrastus and Eurydice that arouses compassion and sympathy.

=== Spectacular effects and the increase of interest ===
To "please an unsatiable Audience" Dryden and Lee make use of devices. In Dryden/Lee's adaptation, for instance, the scenic complexity is much greater than in Sophocles's Oedipus: more settings are employed, such as the streets of Thebes (Act I, Scene Thebes), an open gallery, a royal chamber being supposed behind (Act II, Scene I) or a dark grove (Act III, Scene I).

The plot of Sophocles's Oedipus only spans a few hours. Sophocles holds on to the Greek convention of unity of time. That is, performance on stage and plot progress simultaneously. Dryden/Lee's version extends this time period. Their plot spans two days and a night in between, creating tension. Their play makes extensive use of stage effects. The most elaborate devices are used in Act III: After thunder and lightning ("peal of thunder","flashes of lightning") the stage is "wholly darkened", then a "flash of lightning: the stage is made bright" again.

Oedipus, a Tragedy reflects Dryden's own poetic style. As in many other plays and poems Dryden

insists that through his imagination a poet creates a language by which audience and reader are given a new and vivid experience in life itself. […] In thus making language more important than subject or plot, […].

Dryden focused on clarity and decorum. He always "insisted on the superior role of fancy", that is the excessive usage of imagery and metaphors throughout the play and the addition of poems or songs like the Song to Apollo at the beginning of Act II:

Phœbus, God belov'd by men;
At thy dawn, every Beast is rouz'd in his Den;
At thy setting, all the Birds of thy absence complain,
And we dye, all dye till the morning comes again,
Phœbus, God belov'd by men!
Idol of the Eastern Kings,
Awful as the God who flings
His Thunder round, and the Lightning wings;
God of Songs, and Orphean strings,
Who to this mortal bosom brings
All harmonious heav'nly things!
Thy drowzie Prophet to revive,
Ten thousand thousand forms before him drive;
With Chariots and Horses all o'fire awake him,
Convulsions, and Furies, and Prophesies shake him:
Let him tell it in groans, tho'he bend with the load,
Tho'he burst with the weight of the terrible God. (Act II, p. 23)

To increase the tension, the climax of the drama is postponed in Dryden/Lee's adaptation. In Sophocles's Oedipus, for instance, the seer Tiresias accuses Oedipus straight away as the murderer of Lajus, the former king of Thebes:

Tiresias. Thou art the accursed plague – spot of the land. (Act I, p. 7)

Tiresias. I say that thou stand’st there a murderer. (Act I, p. 7)

Tiresias. I say that thou, in vilest intercourse
With those thou lovest best, dost blindly live … (Act I, p. 7)

In Dryden/Lee's play, this denunciation is postponed to the third act. The seer Tiresias doesn't know Oedipus is the murderer until he calls the ghost of Lajus (Act III). As Scott points out in his introduction, the first anathema of the prophet is levelled only against the unknown murderer:

and it is not till the powers of hell have been invoked, that even the eye of the prophet can penetrate the horrible veil, and fix the guilt decisively upon Oedipus. By this means, the striking quarrel betwixt the monarch and Tiresias is, with great art, postponed to the third act; and the interest, of course, is more gradually heightened than in the Grecian tragedy."

In Sophocles's Oedipus, Jocasta hangs herself, and Oedipus, upon discovering her body, blinds himself with the brooches of her dress. Sophocles makes his Oedipus survive the discovery of his unintentional guilt, and "reserved him, in blindness and banishment for the subject of his second tragedy of Oedipus Coloneus. But there is more to it: in Greek, the words "truth" and "light" are covered by one term: "aletheia". Although Oedipus can see the surface of the world, he is not able to see the truth behind. The blind prophet Tiresias, in contrast, is able to see the truth. At the end of the play, Oedipus tears out his eyes, which are not necessary to see the truth.

Dryden and Lee make their Oedipus tear out his eyes as well, but unlike Sophocles' Oedipus, he commits suicide. But it is not only Oedipus and Jocasta who die in the end:

Of all the persons of the drama, scarce one survives the fifth act. Oedipus dashes out his brains, Jocasta stabs herself, their children are strangled, Creon kills Eurydice, Adrastus kills Creon and the insurgents kill Adrastus; when we add to this, that the conspirators are hanged, the reader will perceive, that the play, which began with pestilence, concludes with a massacre.

The following quotation, taken from the epilogue, summarises Dryden's approach:

Their [i.e. Dryden/ Lee] treat is what your palates relish most,
Charm! song! and show! a murder and a ghost!

Extensive and decorative poetic language, the audience's strong lust for stage action, visual effects, intensive conflicts and complex plots, all changed Greek tragedy in the Restoration era.

== Purcell's music ==
Act III scene i contains a masque with surviving Incidental music by Henry Purcell which includes the famous song Music for a While. As Laius is summoned, with "the stage wholly darkened" Tiresias call for a chorus of alto, tenor and bass voices:

…infernal gods.
Must you have music too ? then tune your voices,
And let them have such sounds as h'ell ne'er heard.
Since Orpheus bribed the shades.

Music First. Then Song:

1 . Hear, ye sullen powers below :
Hear, ye taskers of the dead.
2. You that boiling cauldrons blow.
You that scum the molten lead.
3. You that pinch with red-hot tongs;
1 . You that drive the trembling hosts
Of poor, poor ghosts,
With your sharpened prongs;
2. You that thrust them off' the brim.
3. You that plunge them when they swim :
1 . Till they drown;
Till they go
On a row,
Down, down, down :
Ten thousand, thousand, thousand fathoms low.

Chorus. Till they drown, &c.

This is followed by the solo for alto Music for a While, and then another chorus:

1. Come away.
Do not stay.
But obey,
While we play.
For hell's broke up, and ghosts have holiday.

Chorus. Come away, &c.

[A flash of Lightning- : The stage is made bright, and the Ghosts are seen passing betwixt the Trees.

== Bibliography ==
- Abe, Yoko: John Dryden, King Theseus’s Speech from 'Palamon and Arcite': Doraiden no genshironteki henshin monogatari. Eigo Seinen / Rising Generation, 150:9 (2004 Dec), pp. 567–69.
- Barbeau, Anne T. (1970). The intellectual Design of John Dryden's Heroic Plays. New Haven and London: Yale University Press.
- Blackwell, Mark: The Subterranean Wind of Allusion: Milton, Dryden, Shadwell and Mock – Epic Modernity. Restoration: Studies in English Literary Culture, 1660–1700, 28:1 (2004 Spring), pp. 15–36.
- Brown, Richard E.: The Dryden – Lee Collaboration: Oedipus and The Duke of Guise. Restoration: Studies in English Literary Culture, 1600–1700, 9:1 (1985 Spring), pp. 12–25.* Kinsley, James and Helen (ed.): Dryden. The Critical Heritage. London: Routledge & Kegan Paul, 1971.
- Caldwell, Tanya: John Dryden and John Denham. Texas Studies in Literature and Language, 46:1 (2004 Spring), pp. 49–72.
- Combe, Kirk: Shaftesbury and Monmouth as Lords of Misrule: Dryden and Menippean Transformations. Eighteenth Century: Theory and Interpretation, 45:3 (2004 Fall), pp. 231–48.
- Donnelly, Jerome: 'A Greater Gust': Generating the Body in Absalom and Achitophel. Papers on Language and Literature: A Journal for Scholars and Critics of Language and Literature, 40:2 (2004 Spring), pp. 115–41.
- Frost, William: John Dryden. Dramatist, Satirist, Translator. New York: AMS Press, 1988.
- Gardiner, Anne Barbeau: Spinoza vs. Bossuet: The European Debate behind Dryden's Religio Laici. Restoration: Studies in English Literary Culture, 1600–1700, 28:1 (2004 Spring), pp. 1–14.* Görtschacher, Wolfgang (ed.) / Klein, Holger (ed.): Dryden and the World of Neoclassicism. Tübigen: Stauffenburg Verlag, 2001.
- Gee, Sophie: The Invention of the Wasteland: Civic Narrative and Dryden's Annus Mirabilis. Eighteenth – Century Life, 29:1 (2005 Winter), pp. 82–108.* Dewar – Watson, Sarah: Dryden's Aneis 2.718 – 41. Explicator, 64:1 (2005 Fall), pp. 17–19.* Gelineau, David: Dryden's 'Cymon and Iphigeneia': The 'Vigour of the Worse' Prevailing. Studies in Philology, 102:2 (2005 Spring), pp. 210–32.* Hammond, Paul (ed.) / Hopkins, David William (ed.): John Dryden. Tercentenary Essays. Oxford: Clarendon Press, 2001.
- Hammond, Paul (1991). John Dryden. A literary life. London/ Basingstoke: Macmillan Academic and Professional LTD. ISBN 9780333453803.
- Hopkins, David: Dryden and his Contemporaries. Gillespie, Stuart (ed.) / Hopkins, David (ed.): The Oxford History of Literary Translation in English: Volume 3: 1660–1790. New York: Oxford University Press, 2005.* Hughes, Leo / Scouten, A. H: Dryden with Variations: Three Prompt Books. Theatre Research International, 11:2 (1986 Summer), pp. 91–105.
- Maxwell, J. C.: Dryden's Epilogue to Oedipus, lines 5 – 6. Notes and Queries, 9 (1962), pp. 384–385.* The London Stage 1660–1800. A Calendar of Plays. Entertainments & Afterpieces. Vol. 1. Illinois: Southern Illinois University Press Carbondale, 1960.
- Langbaine, Gerard: An Account of the English Dramatick Poets. Oxford, 1691.
- Langbaine, Gerard, revised by Ch. Gildon (1699). The Lives and Characters of the English Dramatick Poets. London.
- Lee, Anthony W.: Dryden's 'Cinyras and Myrrha'. Explicator, 62:3 (2004 Spring), pp. 141–44.
- Leitch, Vincent B. (ed.): The Norton Anthology of Theory and Criticism. New York and London: W. W. Norton & Company, 2001, pp. 379–388.
- Love, Harold / Love, Rosaleen: A Cartesian Allusion in Dryden and Lee's Oedipus. Notes and Queries, 25 (1978), pp. 35–37.
- Mathew, George: Sexism in Dryden's Criticism: From Text to Context. Central Institute of English and Foreign Languages Bulletin, 14:1- 2 (2004 Dec), pp. 93–112.
- Maurer, Shawn Lisa: Fathers, Sons and Lovers: The Transformation of Masculine Authority in Dryden's Aureng – Zebe. Eighteenth Century: Theory and Interpretation, 46:2 (2005 Summer), pp. 151–73.* Meekins, Jeanne S.: Evidence for Performance of The London Cuckolds, The Maid's Tragedy and Oedipus in 1685 – 186. Theatre Survey: The Journal of the American Society for Theatre Research, 23:1 (1982 May), pp. 101–103.
- Mora, María José: Type – Casting in the Restoration Theatre: Dryden's All for Love, 1677–1704. Atlantis: Revista de la Asociación Espanola de Estudios Anglo – Norteamericanos, 27:2 (2005 Dec), pp. 75–86.* Rierson, Don: Foundations of the English Oedipus: An Examination of the Translations of Sophocles' Oedipus Tyrannus by John Dryden and Nathaniel Lee and Lewis Theobald. Dissertation Abstracts International, 46:1 (1986 July), 159A – 160A.
- Nesvet, Rebecca: Parallel Histories: Dryden's Plutarch and Religious Toleration. Review of English Studies: The Leading Journal of English Literature and the English Language, 56:225 (2005 June), pp. 424–37.
- Richetti, John (ed.): The Cambridge History of English Literature, 1660–1780. Cambridge, England: Cambridge University Press, 2005. xviii, 945 pp.* Roper, Alan: Doctor Balack and Bishop Boloch: Nomenclature in Restoration Parallel Poems. English Language Notes, 43:1 (2005 Sept), pp. 39–48.
- Rober, Alan: Aeneas and Agathocles in the Exclusion Crisis. Review of English Studies: The Leading Journal of English Literature and the English Language, 56:226 (2005 Sept), pp. 550–76.
- Roper, Alan: Dryden, Scott, Pope and Howell's Epistolae Ho – Elianae. Notes and Queries, 51 (249):4 (2004 Dec), pp. 379–80.* Scott, Walter (ed.): The Works of John Dryden. Vol. 6, London 1808.* Schille, Candy B. K.: Last Stands and Pratfalls: The Uneveness of Dryden's Final Tragedy, Cleomenes. Restoration: Studies in English Literary Culture, 1660–1700, 28:2 (2004 Fall), pp. 31–47.
- Roper, Alan: Johnson, Dryden and an Allusion to Horace. Notes and Queries, 53 (251):2 (2006 June), pp. 198–99.
- Saslow, Edward L.: 'Stopp’d in Other Hands': The Payment of Dryden's Pension for 1668–1670. Restoration: Studies in English Literary Culture, 1660–1700, 30:1 (2006 Spring), pp. 31–42.
- Schille, Candy B. K.: At the Crossroads: Gendered Desire, Political Occasion, and Dryden and Lee's Oedipus. Papers on Language and Literature: A Journal for Scholars and Critics of Language and Literature. 40:3, (2004 Summer), pp. 305–28.
- Sloman, Judith: Dryden. The Poetics of Translation. Toronto: University of Toronto Press, 1985.
- Scott, Walter, ed. (1808). The Works of John Dryden. Vol. 6. London.
- Stove, R. J.: Dryden in His Time & Ours. New Criterion, 25:2 (2006 Oct), pp. 24–28.* Thompson, Peggy: 'I Hope, You Wou’d Not Offer Violence to Me': The Trope of Insincere Resistance in Dryden’s The Kind Keeper. Restoration: Studies in English Literary Culture, 1660–1700, 29:2 (2005 Fall), pp. 21–40.
- Tissol, Garth: Dryden’s Additions and Interpretive Reception of Ovid. Translation & Literature, 13:2 (2004 Autumn), pp. 181–93.
- Van Doren, Mark: John Dryden. A Study of His Poetry. Bloomington & London: Indiana University Press, 1960.
- Walls, Kathryn: 'Adam – Wits' in Absalom and Achitophel. Notes and Queries, 52 (250):3 (2005 Sept), pp. 337–38.
- Watson, George (ed.) 1967 (1962): John Dryden: Of Dramatic Poesy and other Critical Essays. In Two Volumes. Volume I. London: J. M. Dent & Sons LTD.
- Werth Gelber, Michael (1999). The Just and the Lively. The literary criticism of John Dryden. Manchester and New York: Manchester University Press.
- Winn, James Anderson: John Dryden and His World. New Haven and London: Yale University Press, 1987..* Hopkins, David: An Uncollected Translation from Voiture by John Dryden. Translation & Literature, 14:1 (2005 Spring), pp. 64–70.
- Zwicker, Steven N.: Dryden and the Poetic Career, pp. 132–59.
- http://www.netlibrary.com.p-serv2.bis.uni-oldenburg.de/nlreader.dll%5B%5D (15 December 2006): Sophocles: Oedipus Rex, translated by Plumptre, E.H.; publication: Hoboken, N.J. BiblioBytes; 2006.
