= Canton of Saint-Pierre =

Coordinates: 14°36′N 60°58′W

The Canton of Saint-Pierre is a former canton in the Arrondissement of Saint-Pierre on Martinique. It had 5,169 inhabitants (2012). It was disbanded in 2015. The canton comprised the communes of Saint-Pierre and Fonds-Saint-Denis.
