= BECO =

BECO or Beco or variation, may refer to:

== Places ==
- Béco, a former principality on the Senegal River, also known as Bethio
- Beco, Fatululic, Fatululic, Cova Lima, East Timor; a village in Fatululic Administrative Post
- Quartier Beco (Beco Quarter), Martinique; see List of populated places in Martinique

== People ==
- de Beco (family), a baronial family of Belgium, see List of noble families in Belgium
- Henri Emile de Béco, a Belgian politician, provincial governor for Brabant, see List of Belgian provincial governors
- Mariette Beco, a Belgian girl who saw an apparition of the Virgin Mary in 1933
- Beco de Castelnau (bishop), a 14th-century Roman Catholic bishop of Roman Catholic Diocese of Cahors
- Roberto "Béco" Dranoff (born 1963; stagename "Béco") Brazilian music producer
- Ayrton Senna (1960-1994; nicknamed "Beco") Formula 1 Brazilian racecar driver

== Companies ==
- Batala Engineering Company (BECO), the former name of the Pakistan Engineering Company
- Beco, a chain of department stores in Venezuela; see List of department stores by country
- Beilgard Co (BECO), a former aircraft company from Beverly Hills, see List of aircraft (B–Be)
- Boston Edison Co. (BECo), an electrical utility, subsidiary of NSTAR (company)
- Brown Engineering Company (BECO), a subsidiary of Teledyne Technologies

== Other uses ==
- Booster Engine Cut-Off (BECO), the event during launch of a rocket with boosters where they stop firing

== See also ==
- Alleyway (Portuguese: beco) where "Beco" is used in the street names of streets in many jurisdictions
- "O Beco" (song), a 1988 song by Os Paralamas do Sucesso off the album Bora Bora (album)
- BE (disambiguation) for "Be Company" values
