= Portoricona =

Scientific classification
- Kingdom: Animalia
- Phylum: Arthropoda
- Subphylum: Myriapoda
- Class: Chilopoda
- Order: Geophilomorpha
- Family: Geophilidae
- Genus: Portoricona; Chamberlin, 1950

Type species
- Portoricona adjunta Chamberlin, 1950

Species
- Portoricona adjunta; Portoricona carbetensis; Portoricona socia

Genus of centipedes

Portoricona is a genus of soil centipedes in the family Geophilidae. This genus includes only three species. These centipedes are found in Puerto Rico and Martinique.

== Discovery and distribution ==
This genus was first proposed in 1950 by the American biologist Ralph V. Chamberlin to contain two new species that he described simultaneously. He described P. adjunta based on three specimens (two females and one male) collected in 1947 in the town of Adjuntas in Puerto Rico. He described P. socia based on five specimens, including two adults, collected from the Guánica State Forest in Puerto Rico. He explicitly designated P. adjunta as the type species for the new genus. Syntypes including both sexes of P. socia that were collected in 1948, as well as a female syntype of P. adjunta, are deposited in the National Museum of Natural History of the Smithsonian Institution in Washington, D.C.

In 2024, the French biologists Étienne Iorio and Mathieu Coulis described P. carbetensis as a new species in this genus. They based the original description of this species on a male holotype and two female paratypes collected from primary forests in Martinique. The male holotype was found in 2019 among moss and dead wood in the commune of Le Lorrain. The female paratypes were found in 2016 and 2017 at an elevation of 1,059 meters in the commune of Fond-Saint-Denis. The holotype is deposited in the Muséum National d'Histoire Naturelle in Paris.

== Taxonomy ==
Chamberlin originally placed this genus in the family Sogonidae. In 1970, however, the American myriapodologist Ralph E. Crabill, Jr., of the Smithsonian Institution deemed Sogonidae to be a junior synonym of Geophilidae. Accordingly, authorities now place this genus in the family Geophilidae.

== Description ==
Centipedes in this genus can reach 22.5 mm in length and can feature from 39 to 55 pairs of legs. The species P. adjunta features the fewest legs in this genus, with only 39 pairs in the male and 41 pairs in the females. The other two species feature many more legs: The species P. socia features 51 pairs in the male and 53 pairs in the female, and the species P. carbetensis features 51 pairs in the male and 53 or 55 pairs in the females.

The head in this genus is longer than wide, with a length/width ratio ranging from 1.2 to 1.5. The labrum is not only entire rather than divided but also fused with the clypeus in the middle. The middle of the posterior margin of the labrum is convex and bears teeth. Each telopodite of the first maxillae features two articles, and at least one pair of lappets project from these telopodites. The coxosternite of the second maxillae is entire rather than divided, with a concave anterior margin. Each telopodite of the second maxillae features three articles and bears a simple claw at the distal end.

The forcipular tergite is shaped like a trapezoid with the anterior margin narrower than the posterior margin, and the posterior margin is narrower than the tergite of the first leg-bearing segment. The forcipular coxosternite features a pair of chitin lines that are distinct and complete, either reaching the condyles at the anterior margin or nearly doing so. The base of the ultimate article of the forcipule features a denticle. One or two fields of pores appear on each sternite from the first to the penultimate leg-bearing segment. The sternites on some of the anterior segments feature a V-shaped impression in the middle. The basal element of each of the ultimate legs features numerous pores on the ventral and lateral surfaces, with no pores hidden by the adjacent sternite. Each of the ultimate legs features six articles and bears a claw at the distal end.

The species P. adjunta is most easily distinguished from the other two species in this genus based on the number of legs. The species P. socia and P. carbetensis can be distinguished from one another based on other traits. For example, the pores on the sternites are divided into two groups on each segment in P. carbetensis but arranged in an undivided transverse band on each segment in the other two species. Furthermore, the head is more elongated in P. carbetensis, with a length/width ratio of about 1.5, than in P. socia, with a length/width ratio of about 1.3. Moreover, the V-shaped pit on the anterior sternites is larger and deeper in P. adjunta and P. carbetensis than in P. socia, which features pits that are smaller, shallower, and more rounded.

== Species ==
This genus includes three species:

- Portoricona adjunta Chamberlin, 1950
- Portoricona carbetensis Iorio & Coulis, 2024
- Portoricona socia Chamberlin, 1950
