= Paul Gauguin Interpretation Centre =

- Centre d'Interprétation Paul Gauguin
- Location within Martinique
- Former name: Gauguin Museum
- Established: 1973
- Location: Le Carbet, Martinique
- Coordinates: 14.727703°N 61.178967°W
- Type: art and heritage
- Director: Simone Jos-Guillot
- Website: cip-paulgauguin-martinique.tumblr.com

The Paul Gauguin Interpretation Centre (French: Centre d'Interprétation Paul Gauguin and former Gauguin Museum) is located at Le Carbet in Martinique and is dedicated to famous French painter Paul Gauguin's stay on the island in 1887.

== History ==
The Paul Gauguin Interpretation Centre, formerly known as the Centre d'Art Musée Paul Gauguin, was originally a museum.
In 1969, museum organizers created the "Association for the Creation of a Museum Paul Gauguin" to celebrate the trip of the famous painter to Martinique.
In 1973 the association acquired a piece of land at Anse Turin in Le Carbet and became the Centre d'Art Musée Paul Gauguin. At the time, Maïotte Dauphite became the president of the association and since then she has dedicated her life to the museum. The museum displayed reproductions of Gauguin's Martinican paintings and reproductions of Tahitian paintings interpreted by a painter, Scopas. The museum also displayed a genealogy of Gauguin, reproductions of his letters to his wife and friends, copies of sketches, lithograph prints representing Martinique in the 19th century, and ceramics from Saint-Pierre before the 1902 Mont Pelée eruption.
In 2011 the "Communauté des Communes du Nord de la Martinique" decide to temporarily close the museum for upgrades. At this point the museum became an interpretative centre with a new director should reopen in 2015/2016.

== Collections ==
The artist Paul Gauguin spent approximately 6 months on the island of Martinique in 1887. Gauguin said he painted a dozen paintings during his stay, four of which ″with figures far superior to [his] Pont-Aven period″. The center's goal is to educate visitors on the life and times of Paul Gauguin, his stay on the island and Martinican heritage of 19th century.
The Center is located at Le Carbet, close to where Gauguin lived during his stay on the island. The renovated facility has four pavilions surrounding a central courtyard. The facility has multimedia and interactive displays for visitors to learn about Gauguin and Martinican heritage from the 19th and early 20th century. The courtyard is a walking route where visitors can see the exotic fruit trees in the background of Gauguin's paintings.
The Center also provides information about other Europeans on the island during Gauguin's stay, mainly the artist Charles Laval and the writer Lafcadio Hearn. The Interpretation Center Paul Gauguin also supports modern Caribbean artists as it has dedicated space to display their work.

== Martinique works ==
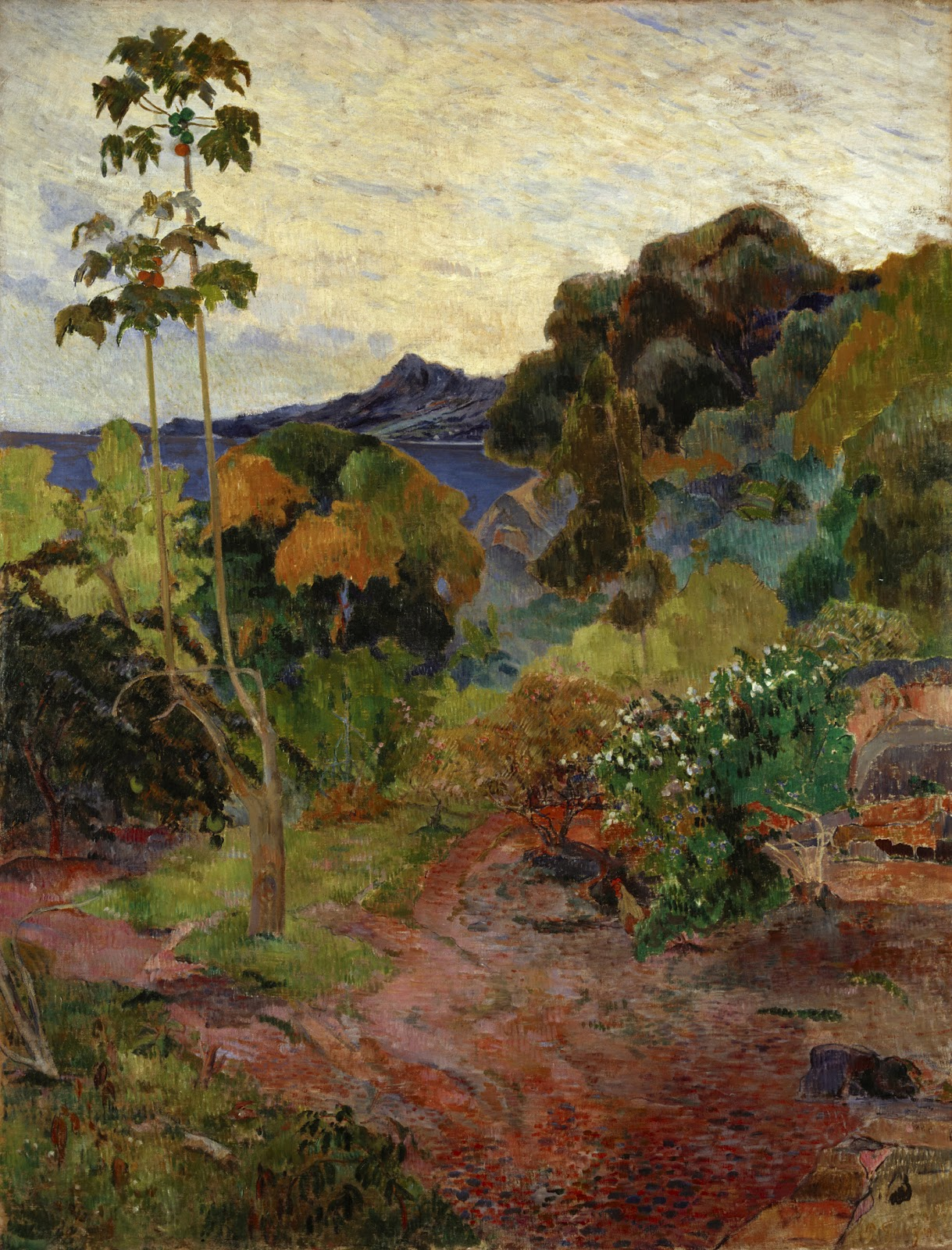
Tropical Vegetation, 1887, Scottish National Gallery

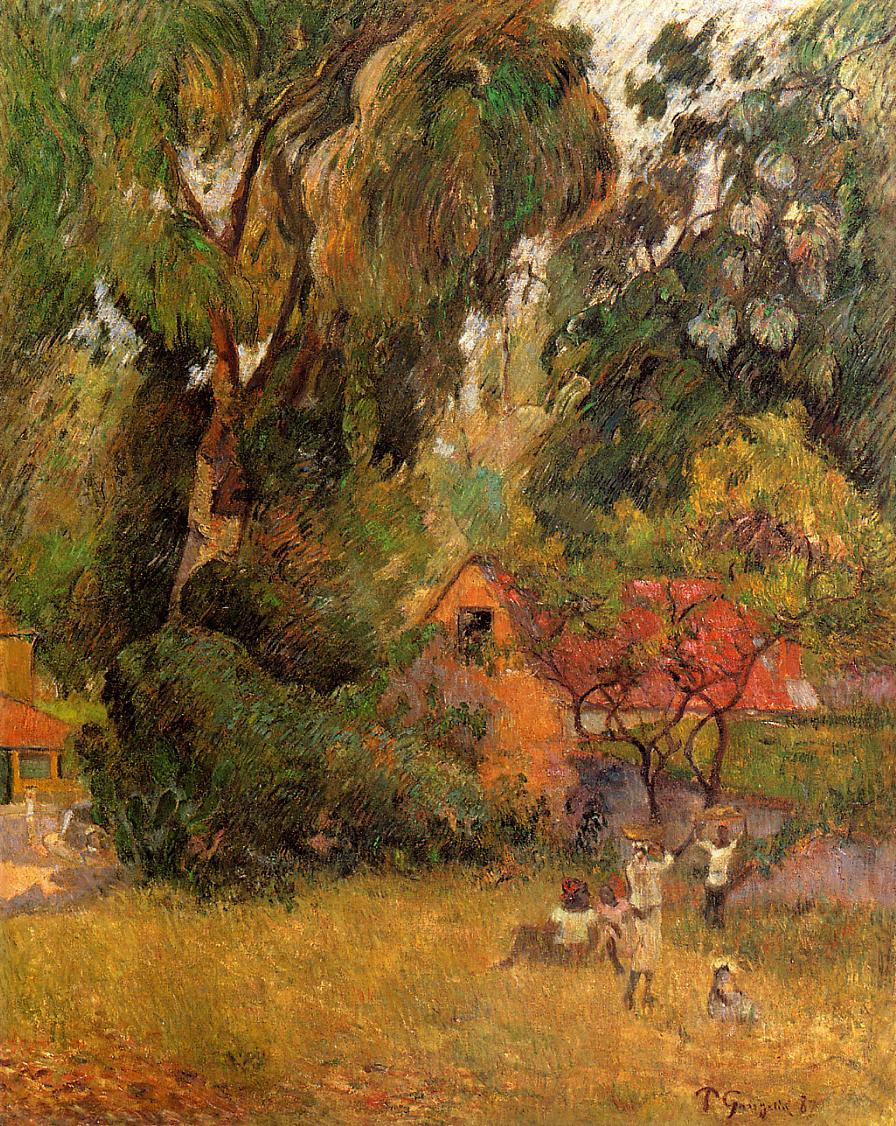
Huttes sous les arbres, 1887, Private collection, Washington

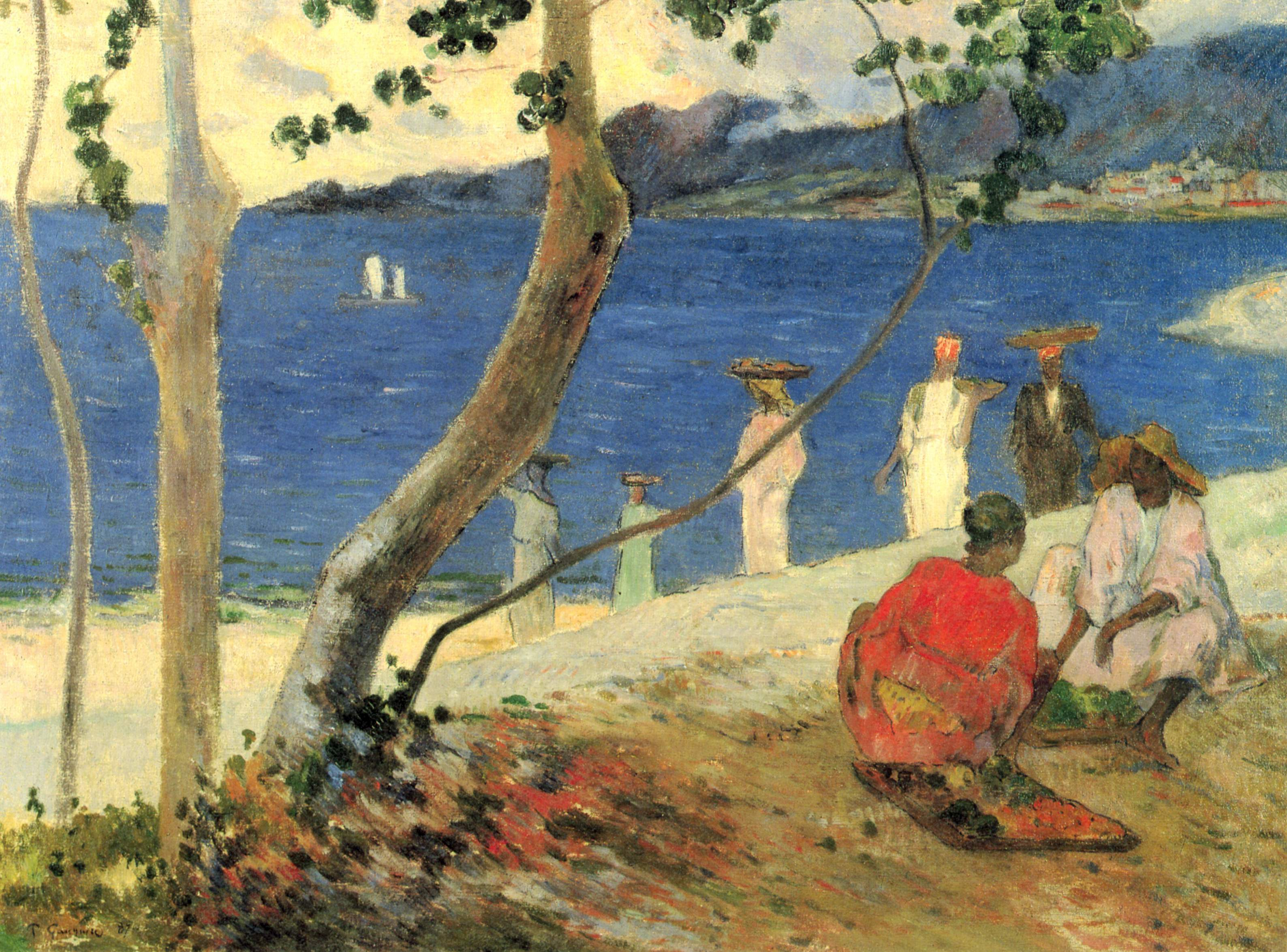
Bord de Mer II, 1887, Private collection, Paris

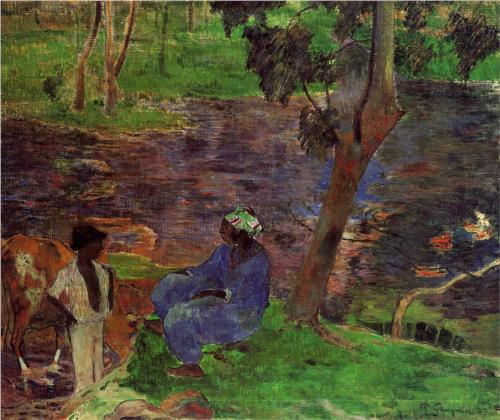
At the Pond, 1887, Van Gogh Museum, Amsterdam

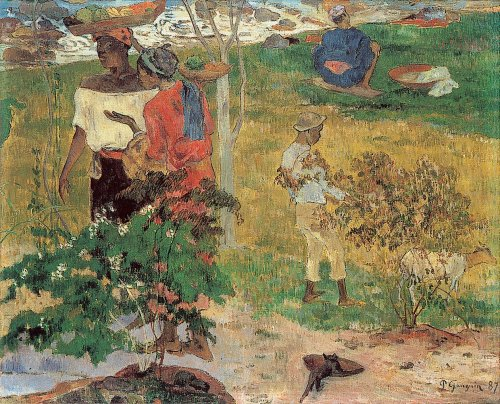
Conversation Tropiques (Négresses Causant), 1887, Private collection, Dallas

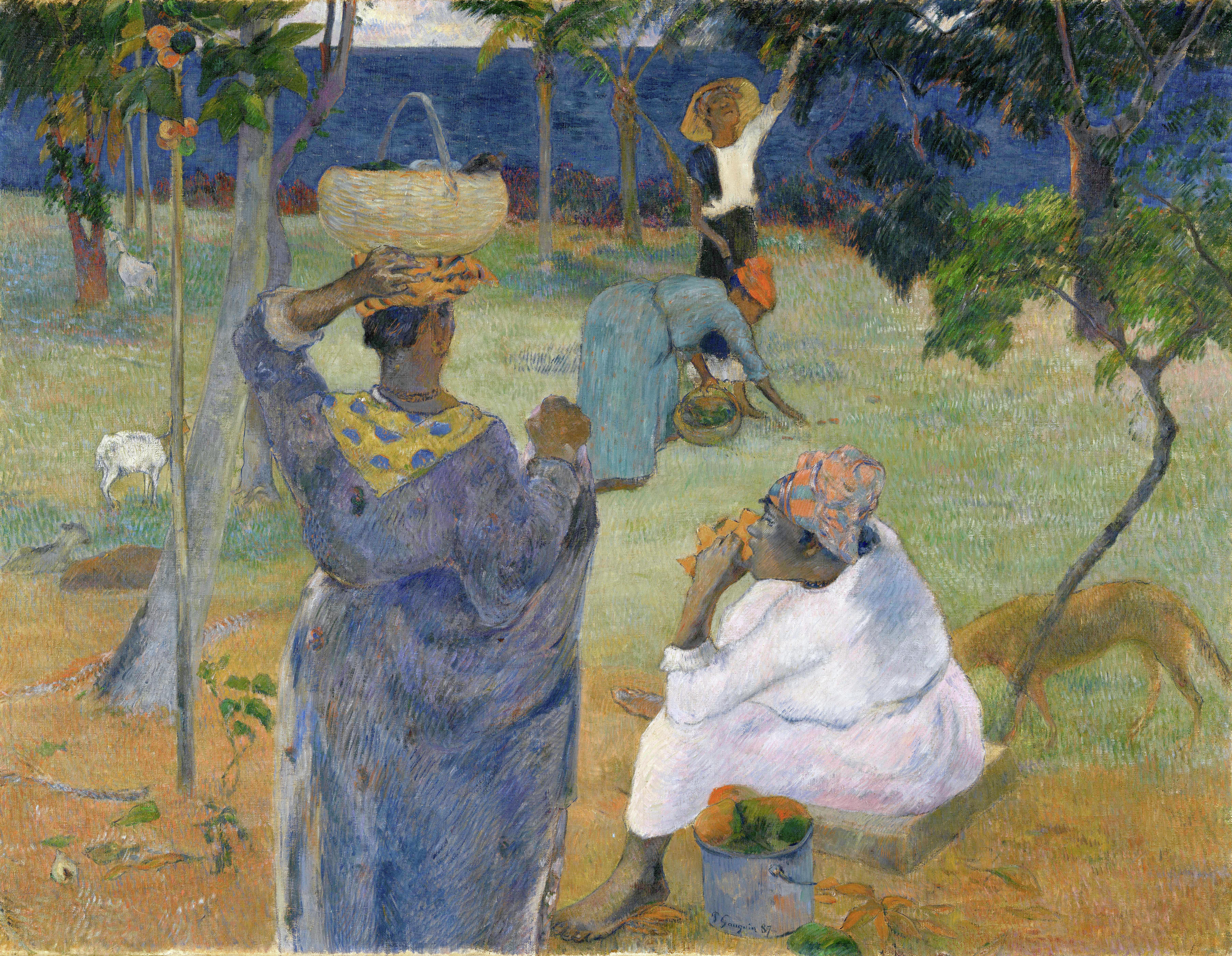
Among the Mangoes (La Cueillette des Fruits), 1887, Van Gogh Museum, Amsterdam
