= Portoricona adjunta =

Scientific classification
- Kingdom: Animalia
- Phylum: Arthropoda
- Subphylum: Myriapoda
- Class: Chilopoda
- Order: Geophilomorpha
- Family: Geophilidae
- Genus: Portoricona
- Species: P. adjunta

Binomial name
- Portoricona adjunta Chamberlin, 1950

Species of centipede

Portoricona adjunta is a species of soil centipede in the family Geophilidae. This centipede is found in Puerto Rico. This centipede is the type species for the genus Portoricona and has fewer legs than any other species in this genus, with only 39 pairs in the male and 41 pairs in females.

== Discovery and distribution ==
This species was first described in 1950 by the American biologist Ralph V. Chamberlin. He based the original description of this species on three specimens (two females and one male) collected in 1947 in the town of Adjuntas in Puerto Rico. He explicitly designated P. adjunta as the type species for the genus Portoricona, which he created to contain two new species, P. adjunta and P. socia, both discovered in Puerto Rico. A female syntype of P. adjunta is deposited in the National Museum of Natural History of the Smithsonian Institution in Washington, D.C.

== Taxonomy ==
Chamberlin originally placed the genus Portoricona in the family Sogonidae. In 1970, however, the American myriapodologist Ralph E. Crabill, Jr., of the Smithsonian Institution deemed Sogonidae to be a junior synonym of Geophilidae. Accordingly, authorities now place the species P. adjunta in the family Geophilidae.

== Description ==
This species features 39 pairs of legs in the male and 41 leg pairs in the females. The dorsal plate on the head is longer than wide and lacks a frontal line. The labrum protrudes in the middle, where the posterior margin is convex and features four stout teeth shaped like cones, with the middle pair much larger than the outer pair. The lateral parts of the labrum feature no teeth. A well developed lappet projects from the first article of each telopodite of the first maxillae.

When closed, the forcipules reach beyond the front of the head. The forcipular sternite lacks teeth but features a pair of complete chitin lines, reaching the condyles at the anterior margin or nearly doing so, running roughly parallel to the lateral margins. The base of the ultimate article of the forcipule features a prominent black tooth shaped like a cone, and about 13 small teeth are visible on the concave margin of the claw, but the more proximal articles all lack teeth.

The ventral surface of the trunk segments features pores arranged in a fairly wide transverse band on the posterior part of each sternite from the first to the penultimate leg-bearing segments. A large deep V-shaped pit appears on the sternites from the second segment to the eighth or ninth segment. The basal element of each of the ultimate legs (coxopleuron) features 15 to 17 small pores. The ultimate legs are swollen in the male.

This species shares many traits with the other two species of Portoricona, P. carbetensis and P. socia. For example, in all three species, the head is longer than wide, the middle of the labrum is prominent and convex and bears teeth, and lappets project from the telopodites of the first maxillae. Furthermore, in all three species, the forcipular sternite features a pair of complete chitin lines, and the base of the ultimate article of the forcipule bears a tooth. Moreover, in all three species, pore fields appear on the sternites from the first to the penultimate segments, a V-shaped pit appears in the middle of some of the anterior sternites, and numerous pores appear on the coxopleura.

The species P. adjunta can be distinguished from the other two species in this genus, however, based on other traits. For example, whereas P. adjunta features only 39 leg pairs in the male and 41 pairs in the female, each of the other two species feature 51 pairs in the male and at least 53 pairs in the female. Furthermore, the pores on the sternites are divided into two groups on each segment in P. carbetensis but arranged in an undivided transverse band on each segment in P. adjunta. Moreover, the V-shaped pit on the anterior sternites is larger and deeper in P. adjunta than in P. socia, which features pits that are smaller, shallower, and more rounded.
