= Lajus =

Lajus is a Polish surname, it may refer to:

- Agnieszka Lajus (born 1974), Polish art historian, theorist, critic and curator, academic teacher
- Marie Lajus (born 1971), French civil servant

== See also ==
- Chilades lajus, small butterfly
