= Raphaël Etifier =

Raphaël Etifier (24 October 1889, in Le Prêcheur – 10 July 1966, in Paris) was a communist politician from Martinique who was elected in 1947 to represent the République du Moyen-Congo in the French senate from 1947 to 1948. After study at the lycée Victor Schœlcher in Fort-de-France, he was admitted to the École nationale des Arts et métiers of Aix-en-Provence, after which he worked as an engineer in public works in colonial Africa.
