= Manon Tardon =

French Resistance fighter from Martinique

- Born: August 17, 1913; Fort-de-France
- Died: December 23, 1989 (aged 76); Fort-de-France
- Monuments: Rue Manon-et-Raphaël-Tardon
- Honours: Croix de Guerre, with vermeil palm

Yvonne Renée Manon Tardon, known as Manon Tardon (17 August 1913–23 December 1989) was a landowner and French Resistance fighter from Martinique, who was one of the only women to be present at the surrender of Nazi Germany. She was awarded a croix de guerre with vermeil palm for her military work during the Second World War.

== Biography ==
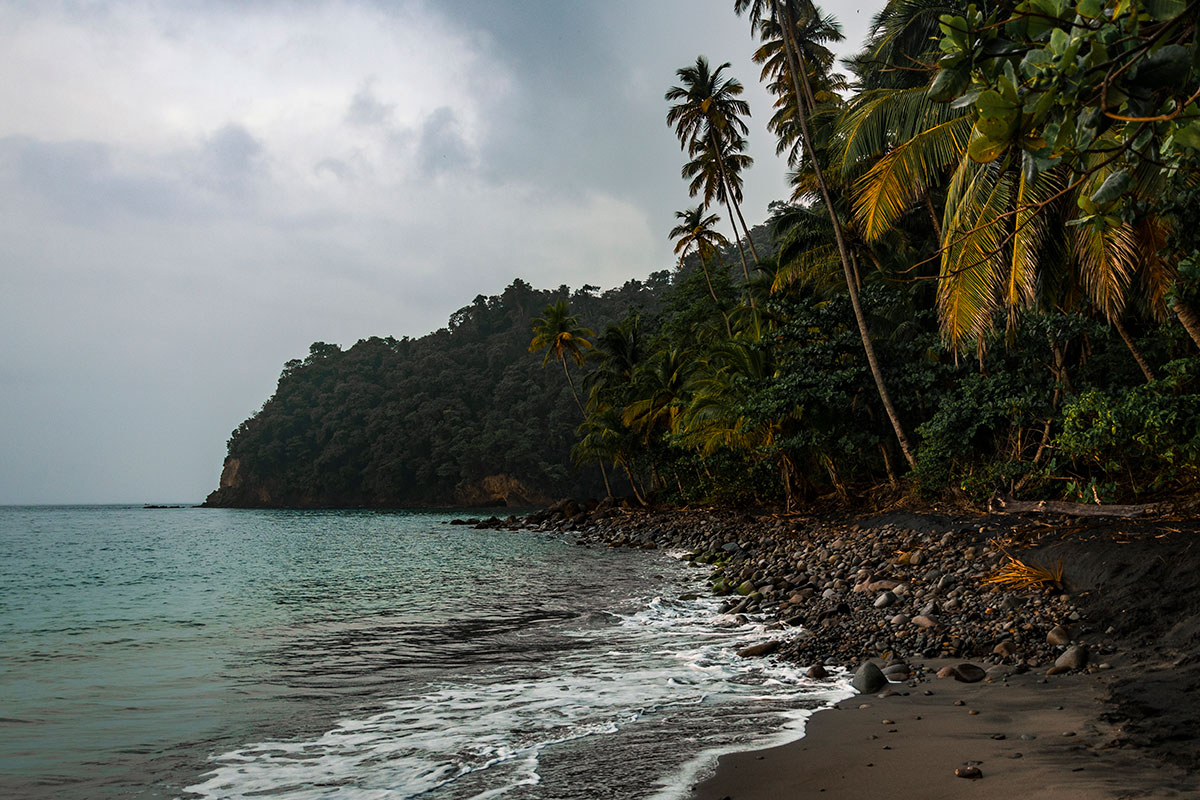
Anse Couleuvre, Le Prêcheur, Martinique

Tardon was born on 17 August 1913 in Fort-de-France. Her parents were Asthon Tardon (1882–1944) and Berthe Marie Waddy (1887–1961) and she was the third of five children in a wealthy, upper-class, Creole family. Her father was a landowner and was also Mayor of Le Prêcheur for several decades, and a general councillor of Martinique. Her brother, Raphaël Tardon, was a poet and writer, whose works were inspired by the island. The family lived at Anse Couleuvre in Le Prêcheur.

At the age of 15, three years earlier than usual, Tardon passed the Baccalaureate exams. In 1929 she then moved to Paris with her mother and siblings, where she enrolled at the Sorbonne to study History. During this time she met her future husband, Jack Sainte-Luce Banchelin. They married in 1936, and had two children, one of whom died in infancy. Their surviving son, Pierre, was born in 1942.

Already a lieutenant in the Auxiliaires féminines de l'Armée de terre (AFAT), in 1944 Tardon joined the Free French Army. She participated in the various resistance networks of Free France, she took refuge in Châteaudun in Eure-et-Loir, where she was at the time of the landing of the Normandy invasion in 1944. On 19 August 1944 she welcomed General Bradley's troops, on their way to liberate Paris.

On 8 May 1945, she was part of the delegation, led by General de Lattre de Tassigny, that received the act of capitulation from Nazi Germany. She was one of the only women present. During her time in the army, she befriended another Creole Martinican, Simone Beuzelin.

Demobilized on 23 June 1946, Tardon returned to Martinique with her son, dedicating the rest of her life to the preservation of the family's estate. She died at the age of 76 in 1989, due to a fall at home. She had an official funeral, where a military delegation was present, in tribute to her commitment to the Republic. Tributes to her were led by the Martinican poet, Georges Desportes (fr).

== Legacy ==
Tardon's home, Residence Anse Couleuvre, which dates from the seventeenth century, is reportedly available to visit.

Rue Manon-et-Raphaël-Tardon, a street in the Didier district of Fort-de-France, is named after Tardon and her brother.

== Awards ==
- Free France War Cross, with vermeil palm.
