= Raphaël Tardon =

Martiniquan writer (1911–1967)

Raphaël Louis Thomas Tardon (October 27, 1911 – January 16, 1967) was a French writer, novelist and essayist of Martiniquais origin. He was posthumously awarded the Prix littéraire des Caraïbes in 1966 for his complete body of work. He was the father of screenwriter Bruno Tardon.

== Biography ==
Born into a wealthy family in Fort-de-France, Martinique, Tardon attended at the Lycée Schoelcher in Fort-de-France and studied law and history in France. At the outbreak of World War II he served briefly in the French army and later in the resistance in southern France. His sister, Manon Tardon, also fought in the Resistance. After the war, he worked in Paris as a journalist, and subsequently worked for the Ministry of Information, in Madagascar, Dakar and Guadeloupe.

His first published book was a collection of stories, Bleu des Isles. It was followed by the novels Starkenfirst (1947), which deals with the slave trade, La Caldeira (1948), and Christ aux poing (1950). In 1951, Tardon published the biography Toussaint Louverture, le Napoléon noir, and in 1963 a study of race entitled Noirs et blancs.

Tardon died in Paris in 1967.

Rue Manon-et-Raphaël-Tardon, a street in the Didier district of Fort-de-France, is named after Tardon and his sister.

== List of works ==
- 1946: Bleu des Isles (stories), Fasquelle (Paris)
- 1947: Starkenfirst (novel), Fasquelle (Paris)
- 1948: La Caldeira (novel), Fasquelle (Paris) - republished in 2002 by Ibis Rouge Éditions
- 1948: Le combat de Schoelcher (non-fiction), Fasquelle (Paris)
- 1950: Christ aux poing (novel), Fasquelle (Paris)
- 1951: Toussaint Louverture, le Napoléon noir (non-fiction), Éditions Bellemand
- 1961: Noirs et blancs. Une solution: l'Apartheid?, Éditions Denoël (Paris)
