= Arrondissement of Saint-Pierre, Martinique =

Coordinates: 14°44′46″N 61°10′33″W

Saint-Pierre
- Arrondissement
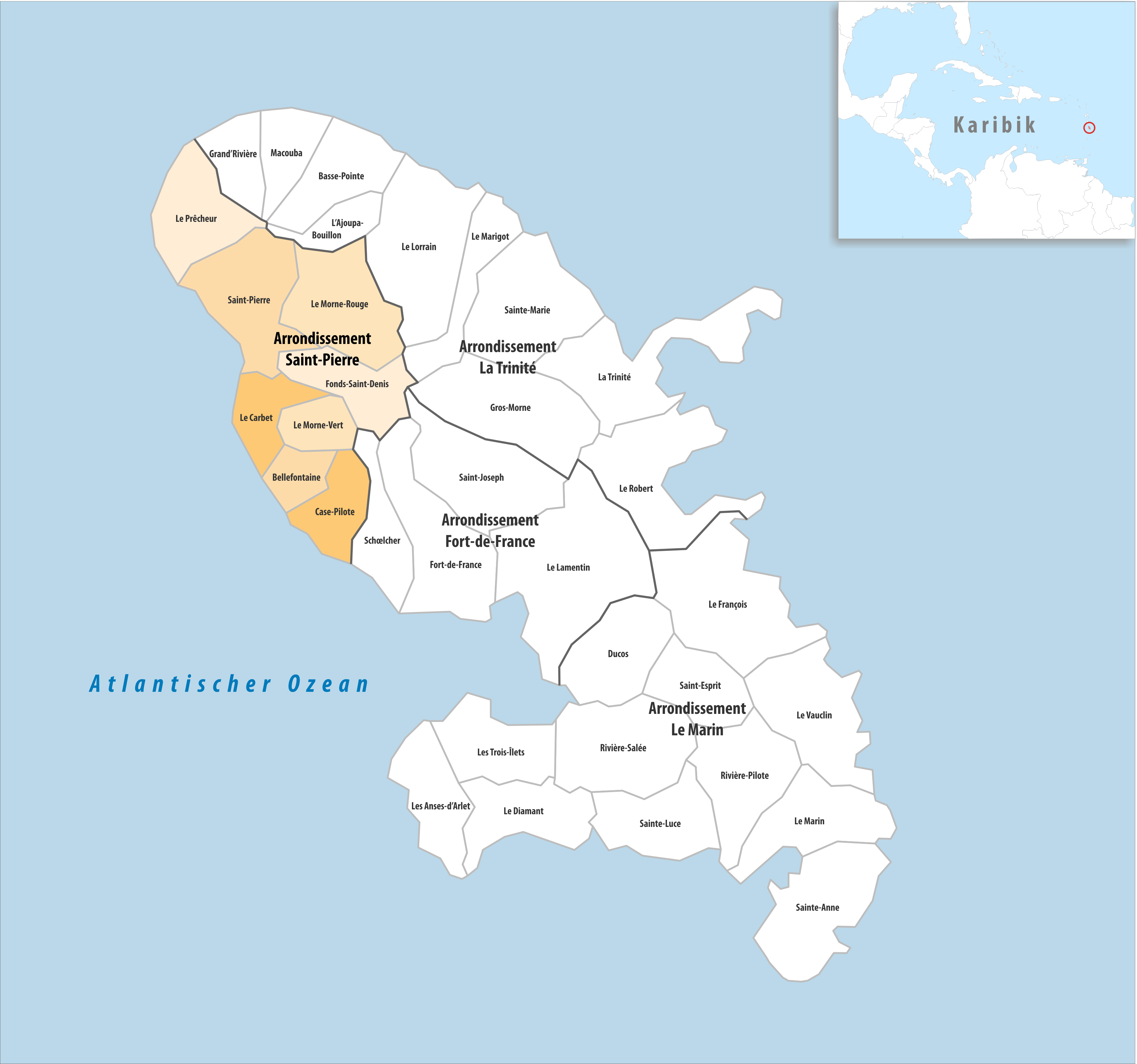
- Location within the region Martinique
- Country: France
- Overseas region and department: Martinique{{{region}}}
- No. of communes: {{{nbcomm}}}
- Area: 210.3 km^{2} (81.2 sq mi)
- Population (2023): 22,190
  - Density: 105.5/km^{2} (273.3/sq mi)
- INSEE code: 9724

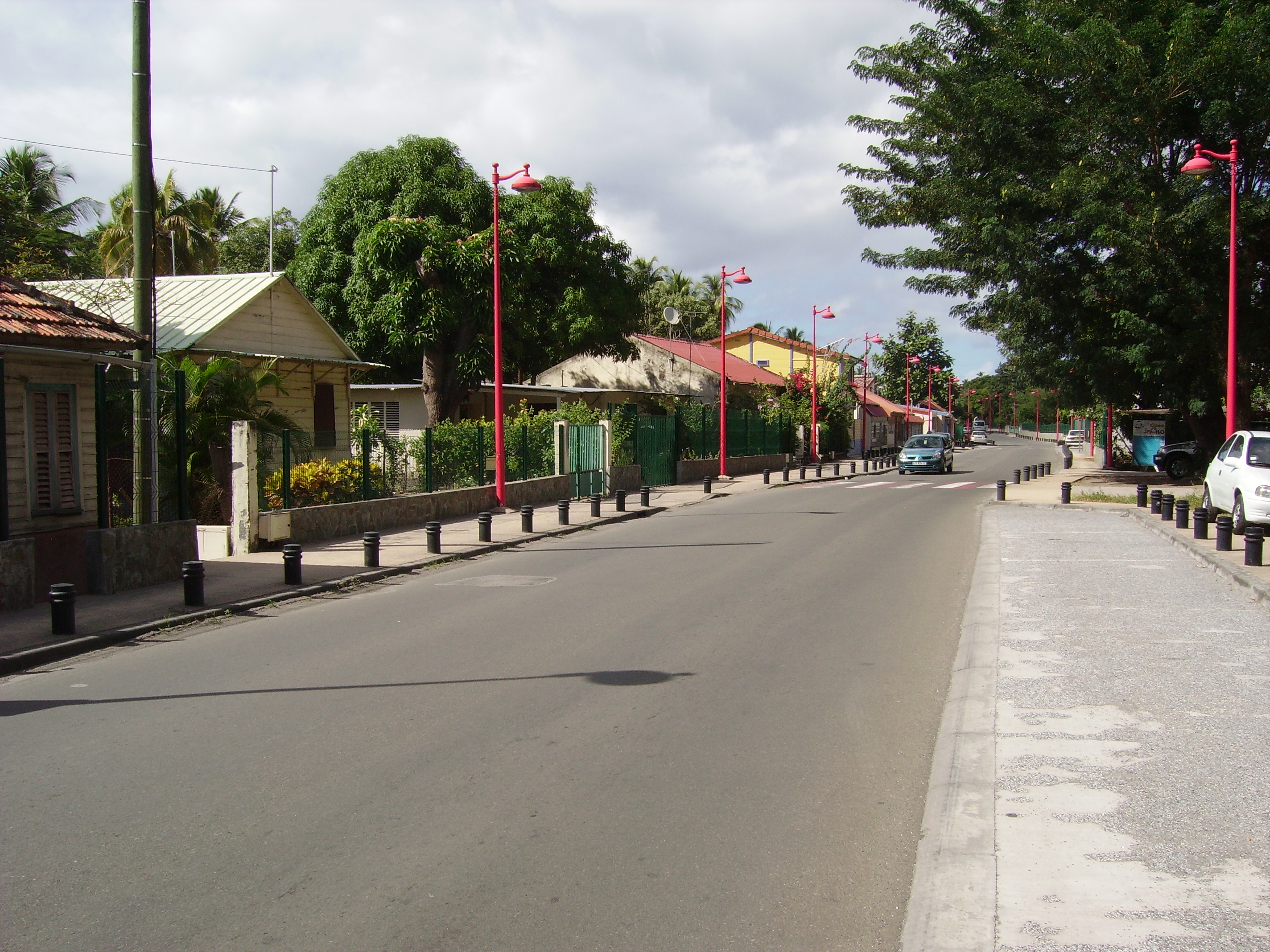
Le Carbet, Saint-Pierre

The arrondissement of Saint-Pierre (French: arrondissement de Saint-Pierre) is an arrondissement in the French overseas region of Martinique. It has eight communes. Its population is 22,352 (2021), and its area is 210.3 km^{2} (81.2 sq mi).

== Composition ==
The communes of the arrondissement of Saint-Pierre, and their INSEE codes, are:

1. Bellefontaine (97234)
2. Le Carbet (97204)
3. Case-Pilote (97205)
4. Fonds-Saint-Denis (97208)
5. Le Morne-Rouge (97218)
6. Le Morne-Vert (97233)
7. Le Prêcheur (97219)
8. Saint-Pierre (97225)

== History ==
The arrondissement of Saint-Pierre, containing eight communes that were previously part of the arrondissement of Fort-de-France, was created in 1995.

Before 2015, the arrondissements of Martinique were subdivided into cantons. The cantons of the arrondissement of Saint-Pierre were, as of January 2015:

1. Le Carbet
2. Case-Pilote-Bellefontaine
3. Le Morne-Rouge
4. Le Prêcheur
5. Saint-Pierre
