= Heureux =

Heureux may refer to:

- French ship Heureux (1782), a ship of the French Navy in service from 1783 to 1798
- HMS Heureux (1800), a ship of the French Navy captured by the British in 1800, lost at sea in 1806
- French corvette Lynx (1804), a ship of the French Navy renamed HMS Heureux when captured by the British in 1807

== See also ==
- L'Heureux
- Heureaux
