= Marie Lajus =

French civil servant (born 1971)

Prefect of Indre-et-Loire
- In office 24 August 2020 – 7 December 2022
- Preceded by: Corinne Orzechowski
- Succeeded by: Patrice Latron

Personal details
- Born: 17 May 1971 (age 54)

Marie Lajus (born 17 May 1971) is a French civil servant. From 2020 to 2022, she served as prefect of Indre-et-Loire. From 2018 to 2020, she served as prefect of Charente. From 2015 to 2018, she served as prefect of Ariège.
