= Desruisseaux =

Desruisseaux is a surname. Notable people with the surname include:

- Paul Desruisseaux (1905–1982), Canadian lawyer, businessman, and politician
- Pierre DesRuisseaux (1945–2016), Canadian poet

== See also ==
- Frédéric Advice-Desruisseaux (born 1983), French footballer
