= Sarraut =

Sarraut is a surname. Notable people with the surname include:

- Albert Sarraut (1872–1962), French politician
- Maurice Sarraut (1869–1943), French newspaper publisher
