= Demare =

Demare is a surname. Notable people with the surname include:

- Arnaud Démare (born 1991), French cyclist
- Jules Demaré, French rower
- Lucas Demare (1910–1981), Argentine film director, producer, and screenwriter
- Lucio Demare (1906–1974), Argentine composer
