= Le Prêcheur =

- Commune
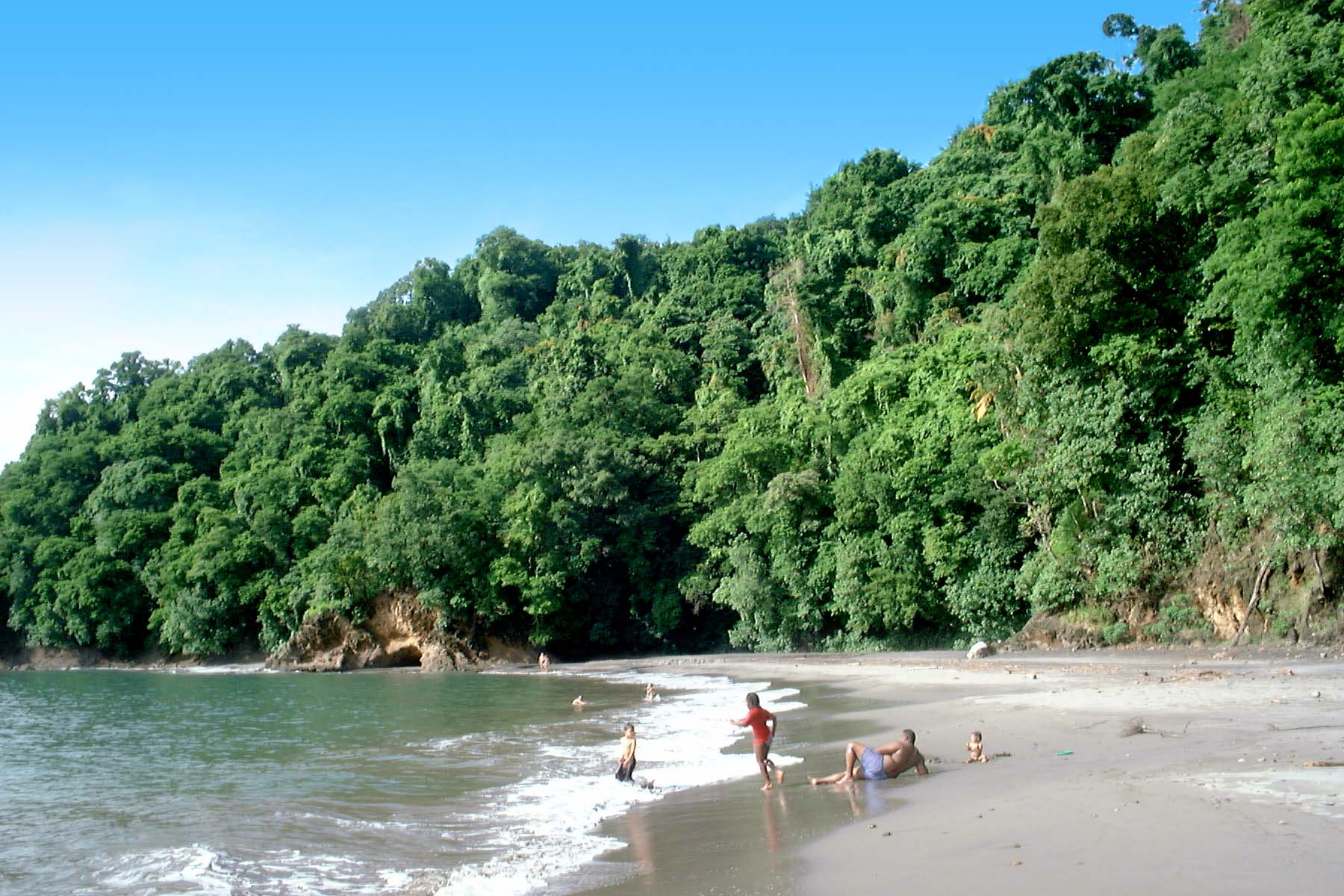
- Anse Couleuvre beach, in Le Prêcheur

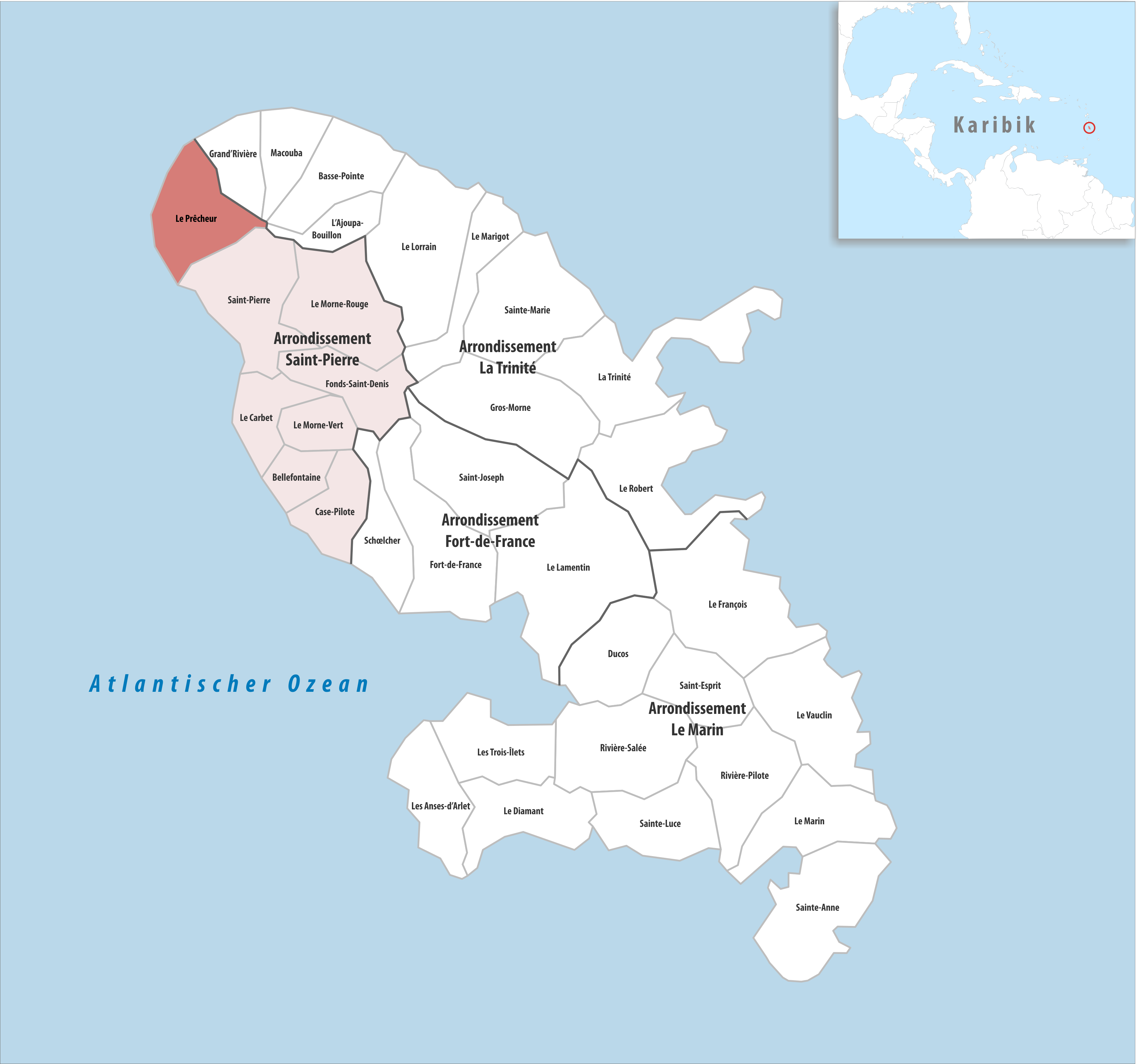
- Location of the commune (in red) within Martinique
- Location of Le Prêcheur
- Location within France
- Coordinates: 14°48′N 61°13′W
- Country: France
- Overseas region and department: Martinique
- Arrondissement: Saint-Pierre
- Intercommunality: CA Pays Nord Martinique

Government
  - Mayor (2022–2026): Germain Duton
- Area^{1}: 29.92 km^{2} (11.55 sq mi)
- Highest elevation: 1,300 m (4,300 ft)
- Lowest elevation: 0 m (0 ft)
- Population (2023): 1,479
  - Density: 49.43/km^{2} (128.0/sq mi)
- Time zone: UTC−04:00 (AST)
- INSEE/Postal code: 97219 /97250
- ^{1} French Land Register data, which excludes lakes, ponds, glaciers > 1 km^{2} (0.386 sq mi or 247 acres) and river estuaries.

Le Prêcheur (French pronunciation: [lə pʁɛʃœʁ]; Martinican Creole: Pwéchè) is a village and commune in the French overseas department, region and island of Martinique.

Asthon Tardon (1882-1944), father of Manon Tardon, was mayor of the community; their family's estate was at Anse Couleuvre.

== See also ==
- Communes of Martinique
- Raphaël Etifier
