= Agnieszka Lajus =

Polish art historian (born 1974)

- Born: 1974 (age 51–52)
- Citizenship: Polish
- Occupations: Art historian, theorist, critic and curator

Agnieszka Lajus (born 1974) is a Polish art historian, theorist, critic and curator, academic teacher at the University of Warsaw and the director of the National Museum in Warsaw since 2025.

== Biography ==
In 1998 she graduated from the Institute of History of Art of the University of Warsaw. In the second half of the 1990s she started work at the National Museum in Warsaw. In 2005 she obtained a PhD. In the same year she started work at the University of Warsaw. In 2018 she obtained habilitation.

She was elected a member of International Council of Museums and a member of the council of the National Museum in Wrocław. She was appointed the director of the National Museum in Warsaw from February 2025.

== Books ==
- Śladami dawnych mistrzów. Mit Holandii Złotego Wieku w dziewiętnastowiecznej kulturze artystycznej. Warszawa. 2008.
- In the Footsteps of the Old Masters. The Myth of Golden Age Holland in the 19th century Art and Art Criticism. Klaudyna Michałowicz (trans.). Frankfurt am Main. 2016.
- "Francuski wiek" i obrazy rokoka w świetle nowoczesnej krytyki i sztuki. Wizje, rewizje, interpretacje. Warszawa. 2016.
