= Kathryn Walls =

Emeritus professor of English literature in New Zealand

Academic background
- Education: Victoria University of Wellington, University of Toronto
- Thesis: "The pilgrimage of the lyf of the manhode": The prose translation from Guillaume de Deguileville in its English context (1976)
- Doctoral advisor: Denton Fox

Kathryn Margaret Walls née Meek is a New Zealand scholar of English literature, and is an emeritus professor at Victoria University of Wellington, specialising in English literature from the Middle Ages to present day.

== Academic career ==
Walls completed a Bachelor and a Master's degree at the University of Victoria Wellington, and was appointed as a lecturer at the university. She was awarded a Canadian Commonwealth Scholarship to undertake a PhD at the University of Toronto. Her thesis on Guillaume de Deguileville's work was titled "The pilgrimage of the lyf of the manhode": The prose translation from Guillaume de Deguileville in its English context. Walls then joined the faculty of the Victoria University, becoming a full-time lecturer in 1988. She was Head of the School of English, Film, Theatre, and Media Studies from 2020 until her retirement, and served on the University Council as staff representative.

Walls is an executive editor of a Spenser series for the Manchester University Press, and a life member of Clare Hall, Cambridge.

Walls has published an edition of William Baspoole's The Pilgrime, and wrote God’s Only Daughter: Spenser’s Una as the Invisible Church, published in 2013 by Manchester University Press. She taught on English literature from Chaucer to Alexander Pope, and children's literature, especially Margaret Mahy. Walls was appointed emeritus professor at Victoria in 2020. In her retirement, she planned to work on the influence of the scientific revolution on the poetry of Alexander Pope.

== Personal life ==
Walls is married to musicologist and conductor Peter Walls, who is also an Emeritus Professor at Victoria.

== Selected works ==
- God's Only Daughter: Spenser's Una as the Invisible Church. Manchester University Press. 2013.
- A Made-Up Place: New Zealand in Young Adult Fiction. Victoria University Press. 2011.
- Walls, K; Stobo, M, eds. (2008). The Pilgrime, William Baspoole. Arizona Center for Medieval and Renaissance Studies with Renaissance English Text Society. pp. 1–558.
- Walls, Kathryn. "Beyond the pale". New Zealand Review of Books Pukapuka Aotearoa.
- Walls, Kathryn (2018). "David Bindon's 'Pledges' and the Marketable Children of Jonathan Swift's A Modest Proposal". Notes and Queries. 65 (2): 233–235. doi:10.1093/notesj/gjy038. Wikidata Q130087731.
- Walls, Kathryn (2014). "Louise Moulton's "Number 101": A Mid-Nineteenth-Century Anticipation of the Stone Angel in Margaret Laurence'sThe Stone Angel". ANQ-a Quarterly Journal of Short Articles Notes and Reviews. 27 (4): 171–176. doi:10.1080/0895769x.2014.990954. Wikidata Q58140288.
- Walls, Kathryn (2010). "The Analogy from Chemistry in Pope'sEpistle to a Lady, 269–92". ANQ-a Quarterly Journal of Short Articles Notes and Reviews. 23 (3): 154–162. doi:10.1080/0895769x.2010.494492. Wikidata Q58136698.
- Walls, Kathryn (2003). "The Axe in Sir Gawain and the Green Knight". ANQ-a Quarterly Journal of Short Articles Notes and Reviews. 16 (1): 13–18. doi:10.1080/08957690309598180. Wikidata Q58280310.
- Walls, Kathryn (1991). "To "prosecute the Plot": A Spenser Allusion inAbsalom and Achitophel". ANQ-a Quarterly Journal of Short Articles Notes and Reviews. 4 (3): 122–124. doi:10.1080/0895769x.1991.10542665. Wikidata Q58151394.
