= L'Heureux =

L'Heureux is a surname of French origin. People with that name include:

- Bob L'Heureux (born 1940), American politician
- Christine L'Heureux (fl. c. 1997), Canadian author and publisher
- Claire L'Heureux-Dubé (born 1927), Canadian judge
- Élise L'Heureux (1827–1896), Canadian photographer
- Gaston L'Heureux (1943–2011), Canadian journalist and TV host
- Ginette L'Heureux (fl. from 1986), Canadian administrator and politician
- John L'Heureux (1934–2019), American author
- Justine L'Heureux (born 1989), Canadian speed skater
- Patrice L'Heureux (1972–2018), Canadian boxer
- Philippe Lheureux, Moon landing conspiracy theorist
- Sonia L'Heureux, Parliamentary Librarian of Canada 2012–2018
- Yvon L'Heureux (1914–1984), Canadian politician
- Zachary L'Heureux (born 2003), Canadian ice hockey player

== See also ==
- Saint-Martin-l'Heureux, a place in France
- L'Heureux, French frigate on which Charles Edward Stuart escaped after the failure of the Jacobite rising of 1745
- Heureux (disambiguation)
- Heureaux
