= Fond-Zombi =

Coordinates: 14°39′00″N 061°03′00″W

Fond-Zombi (or Quartier Fond Zombi) is a populated place in the arrondissement of Fort-de-France on Martinique.
