= Case-Pilote =

- Commune
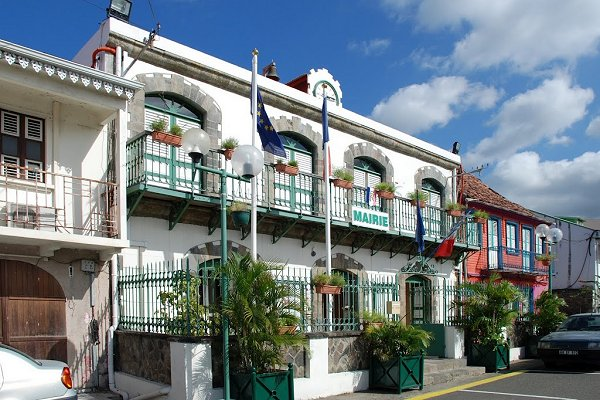
- The town hall in Case-Pilote

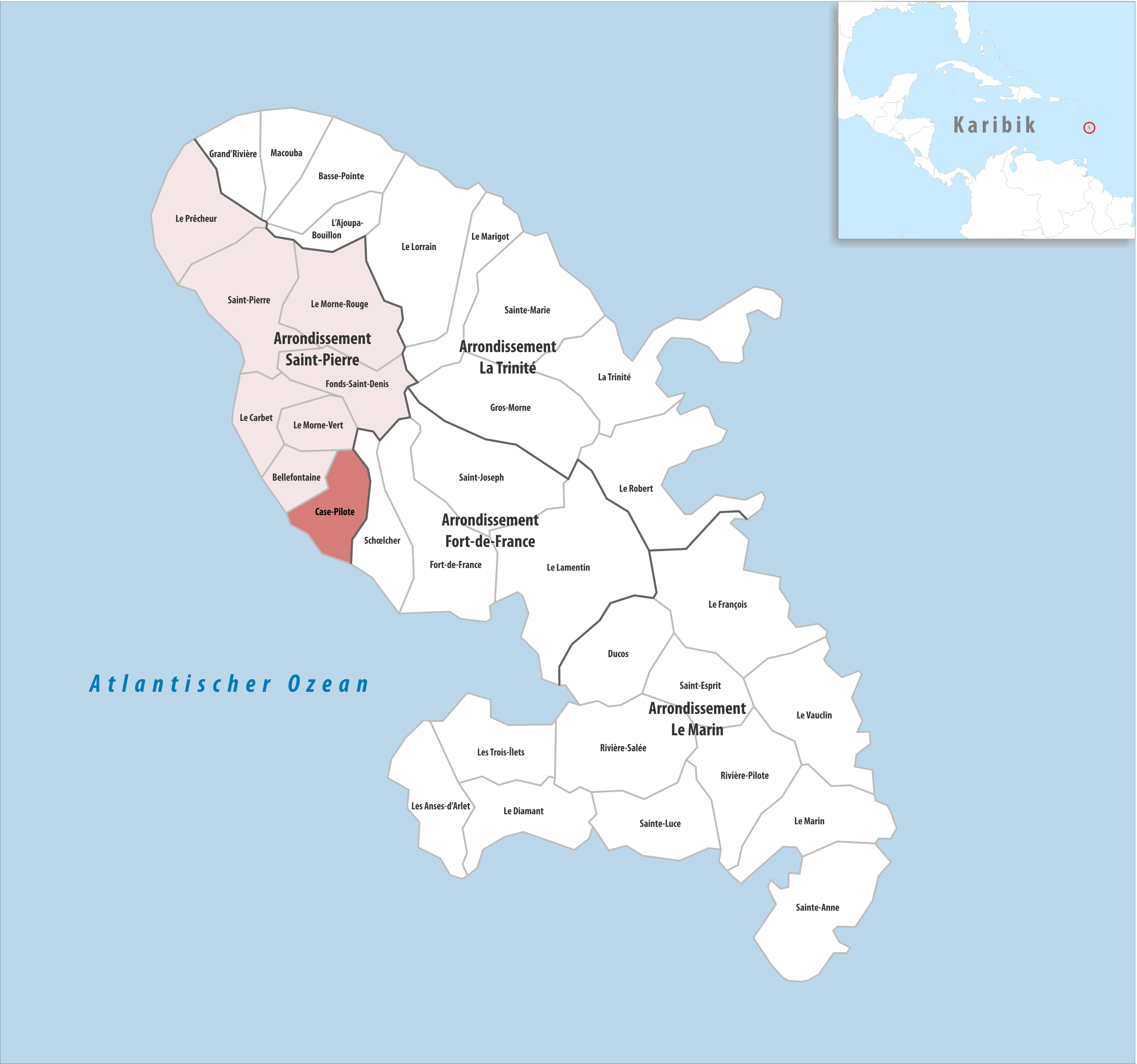
- Location of the commune (in red) within Martinique
- Location of Case-Pilote
- Location within France
- Coordinates: 14°38′35″N 61°08′15″W
- Country: France
- Overseas region and department: Martinique
- Arrondissement: Saint-Pierre
- Intercommunality: CA Pays Nord Martinique

Government
  - Mayor (2024–2026): Jean-Marc Bocquet
- Area^{1}: 18.44 km^{2} (7.12 sq mi)
- Highest elevation: 915 m (3,002 ft)
- Lowest elevation: 0 m (0 ft)
- Population (2023): 4,537
  - Density: 246.0/km^{2} (637.2/sq mi)
- Time zone: UTC−04:00 (AST)
- INSEE/Postal code: 97205 /97222
- ^{1} French Land Register data, which excludes lakes, ponds, glaciers > 1 km^{2} (0.386 sq mi or 247 acres) and river estuaries.

Case-Pilote (French pronunciation: [kaz pilɔt]; Martinican Creole: Kazpilot) is a town and commune in the French overseas department of Martinique.

== Population ==
Historical population
Year	Pop.	±% p.a.
1967	1,709	—
1974	1,775	+0.54%
1982	2,016	+1.60%
1990	3,650	+7.70%
1999	4,048	+1.16%
2007	4,461	+1.22%
2012	4,455	−0.03%
2017	4,454	−0.00%
2023	4,537	+0.31%
Source: INSEE

== See also ==
- Communes of Martinique
