= Bellefontaine, Martinique =

Bellefontaine
- Commune
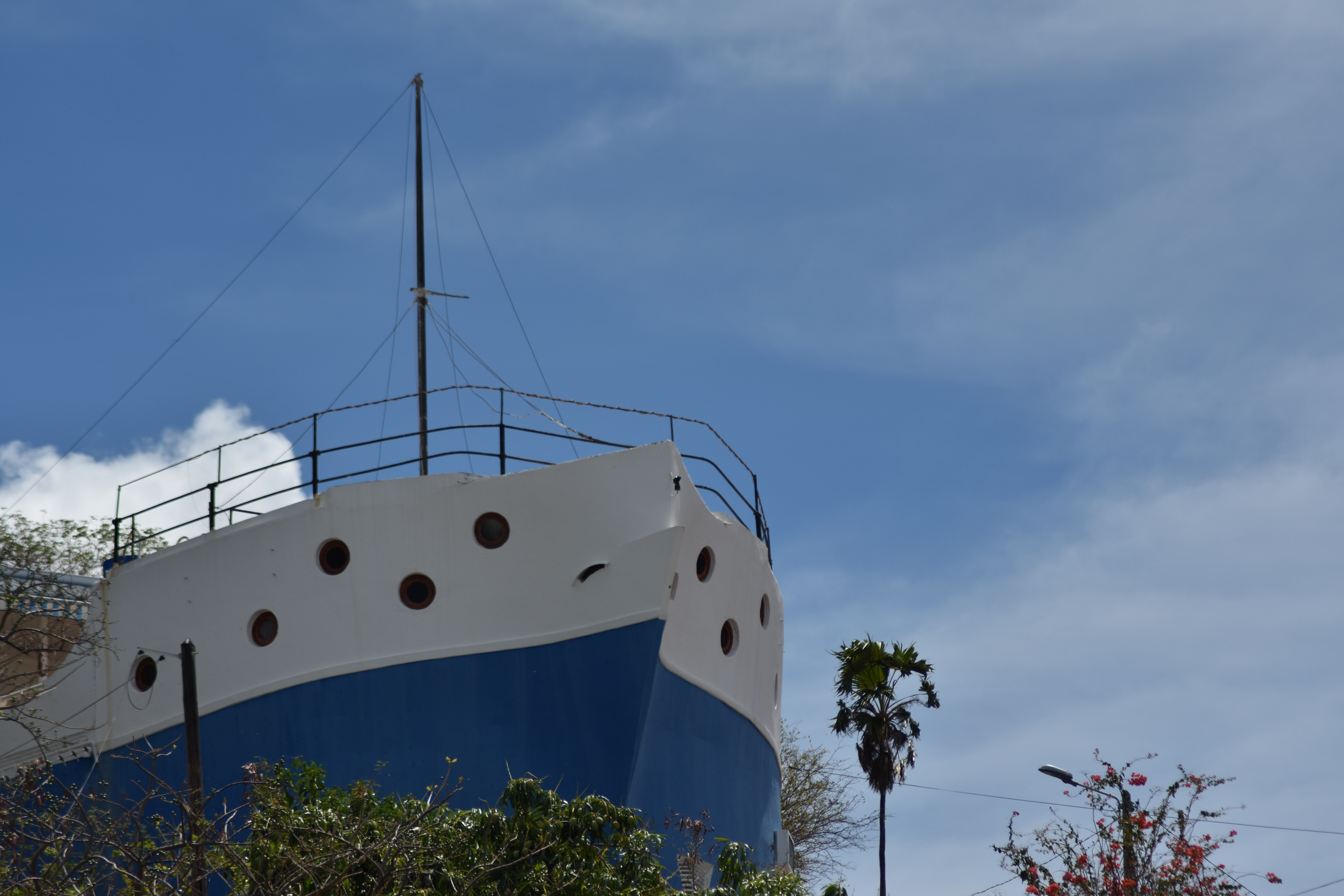
- A boat-shaped restaurant in the commune.

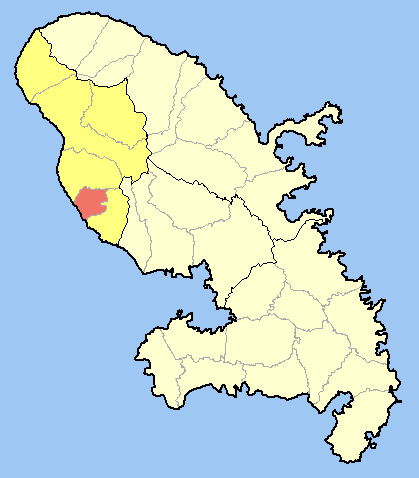
- Location of the commune (in red) within Martinique
- Location of Bellefontaine
- Location within France
- Coordinates: 14°40′30″N 61°09′50″W
- Country: France
- Overseas region and department: Martinique
- Arrondissement: Saint-Pierre
- Intercommunality: CA Pays Nord Martinique

Government
  - Mayor (2020–2026): Félix Ismain
- Area^{1}: 11.89 km^{2} (4.59 sq mi)
- Population (2023): 1,746
  - Density: 146.8/km^{2} (380.3/sq mi)
- Demonym(s): Bellifontain, Bellifontaine
- Time zone: UTC−04:00 (AST)
- INSEE/Postal code: 97234 /97222
- ^{1} French Land Register data, which excludes lakes, ponds, glaciers > 1 km^{2} (0.386 sq mi or 247 acres) and river estuaries.

Bellefontaine (French pronunciation: [bɛlfɔ̃tɛn]; Martinican Creole: Belfontenn or Belfontèn) is a village and commune in the French overseas department of Martinique.

== See also ==
- Communes of Martinique
