= Le Carbet =

- Commune
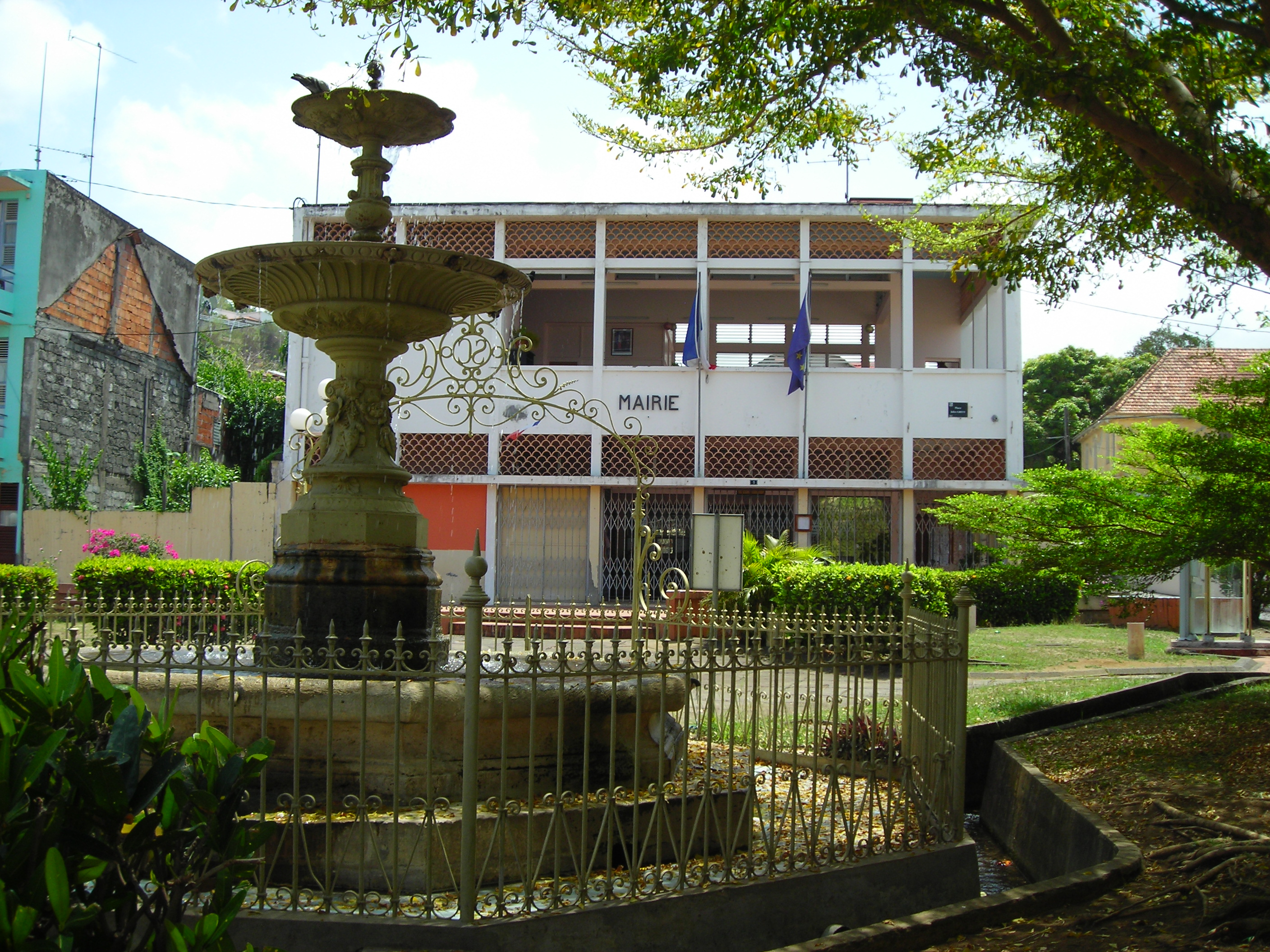
- The town hall of Le Carbet

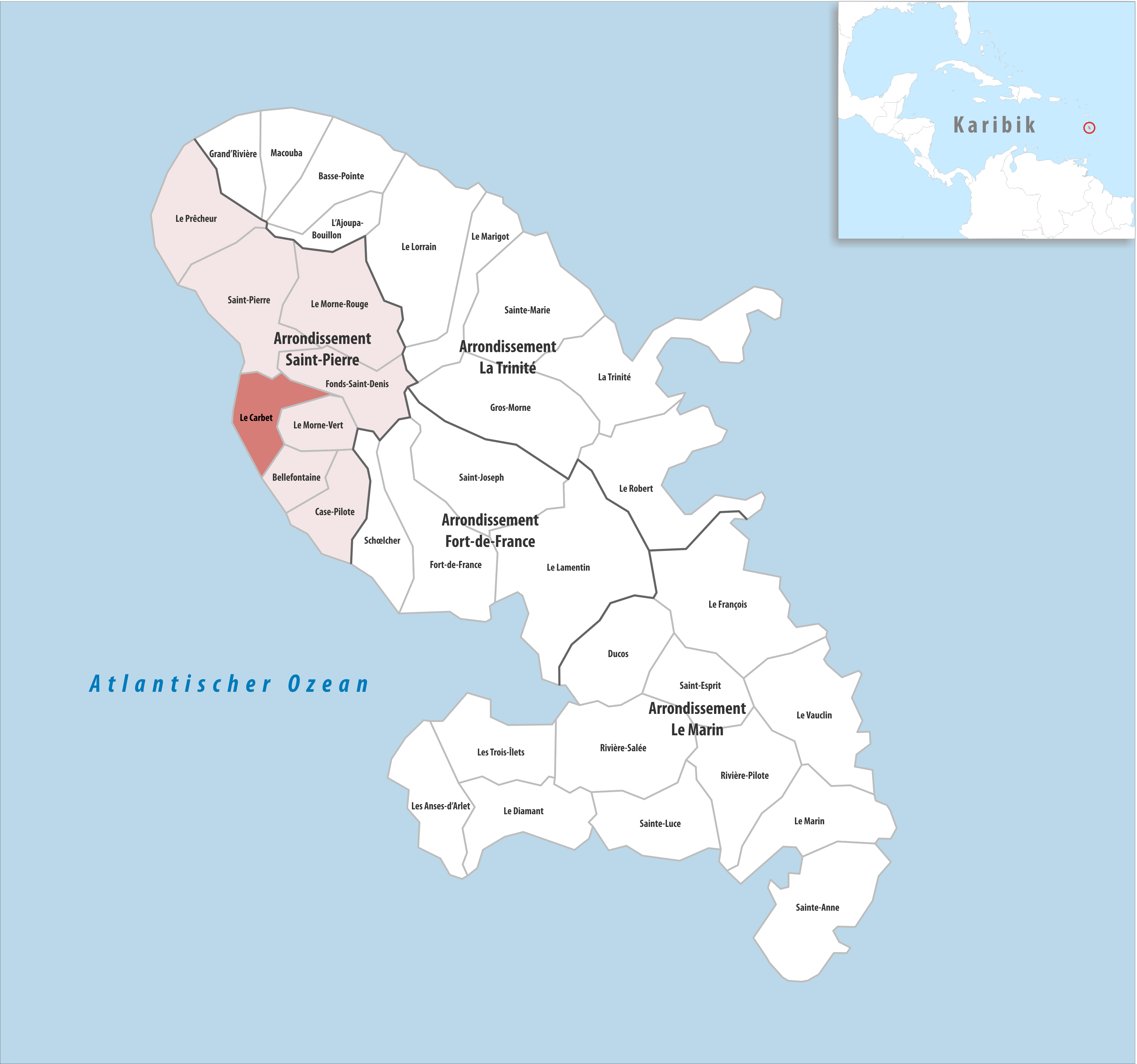
- Location of the commune (in red) within Martinique
- Location of Le Carbet
- Coordinates: 14°42′40″N 61°10′50″W
- Country: France
- Overseas region and department: Martinique
- Arrondissement: Saint-Pierre
- Intercommunality: CA Pays Nord Martinique

Government
  - Mayor (2020–2026): Jean-Claude Ecanvil
- Area^{1}: 36.00 km^{2} (13.90 sq mi)
- Highest elevation: 570 m (1,870 ft)
- Lowest elevation: 0 m (0 ft)
- Population (2023): 3,721
  - Density: 103.4/km^{2} (267.7/sq mi)
- Demonym: Carbétien.ne
- Time zone: UTC−04:00 (AST)
- INSEE/Postal code: 97204 /97221
- ^{1} French Land Register data, which excludes lakes, ponds, glaciers > 1 km^{2} (0.386 sq mi or 247 acres) and river estuaries.

Le Carbet (French pronunciation: [lə kaʁbe], [lə kaʁbɛ]; Martinican Creole: Kabé) is a village and commune in the French overseas department of Martinique.

== Population ==
Historical population
Year	Pop.	±% p.a.
1967	3,364	—
1974	3,128	−1.03%
1982	2,711	−1.77%
1990	3,014	+1.33%
1999	3,316	+1.07%
2007	3,722	+1.45%
2012	3,736	+0.08%
2017	3,535	−1.10%
2023	3,721	+0.86%
Source: INSEE

== See also ==
- Communes of Martinique
- Paul Gauguin Interpretation Centre
