= Fonds-Saint-Denis =

- Commune
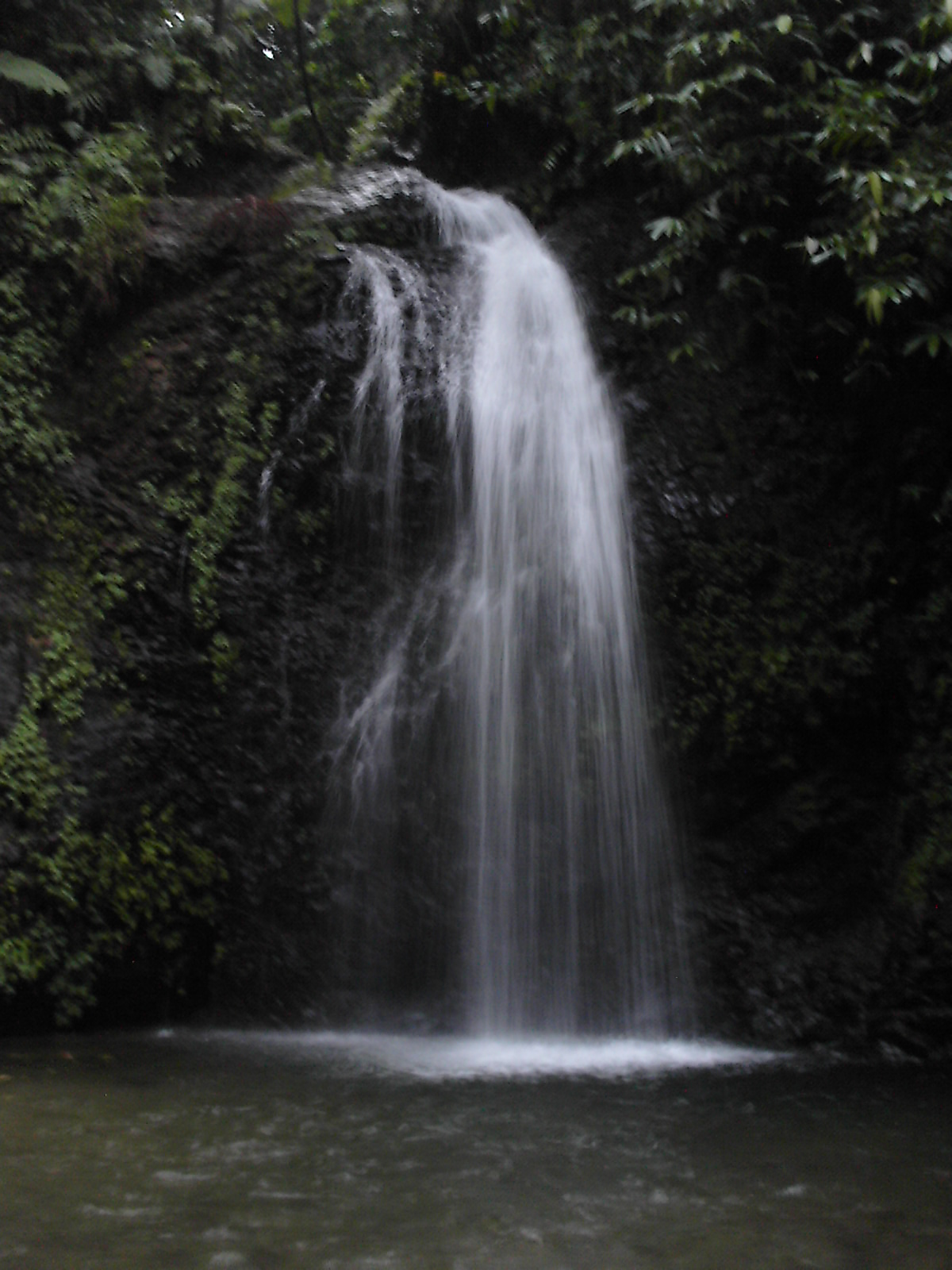
- The waterfall of Saut Gendarme, in Fonds-Saint-Denis

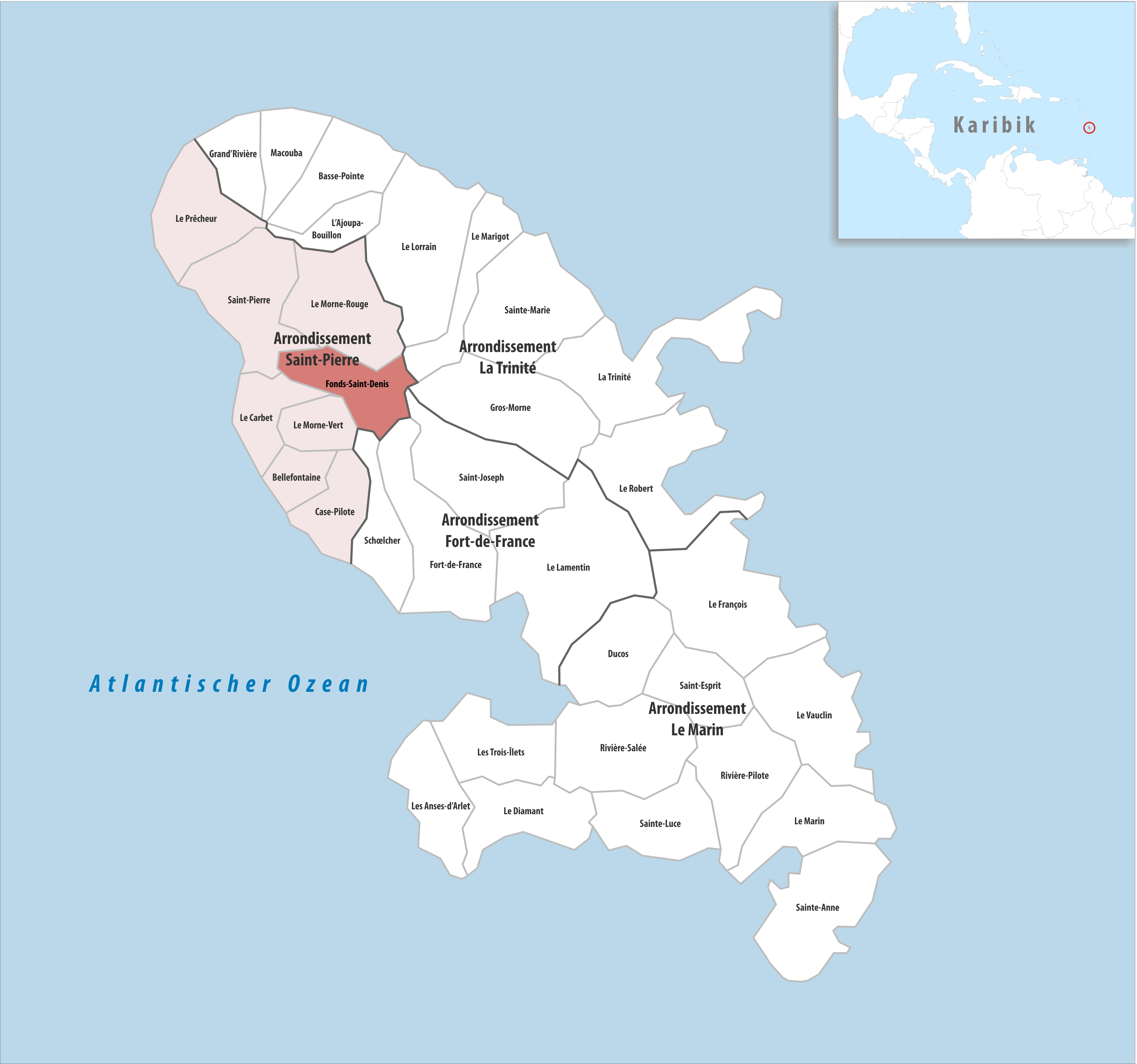
- Location of the commune (in red) within Martinique
- Location of Fonds-Saint-Denis
- Location within France
- Coordinates: 14°44′20″N 61°08′00″W
- Country: France
- Overseas region and department: Martinique
- Arrondissement: Saint-Pierre
- Intercommunality: CA Pays Nord Martinique

Government
  - Mayor (2020–2026): Annick Guetty Comier
- Area^{1}: 24.28 km^{2} (9.37 sq mi)
- Highest elevation: 1,159 m (3,802 ft)
- Lowest elevation: 129 m (423 ft)
- Population (2023): 640
  - Density: 26/km^{2} (68/sq mi)
- Time zone: UTC−04:00 (AST)
- INSEE/Postal code: 97208 /97250
- ^{1} French Land Register data, which excludes lakes, ponds, glaciers > 1 km^{2} (0.386 sq mi or 247 acres) and river estuaries.

Fonds-Saint-Denis (French pronunciation: [fɔ̃ sɛ̃ d(ə)ni]; Martinican Creole: Fonsendèni, Fonsendini; lit. 'St. Dennis backgrounds') is a village and commune in the French overseas department and region, and island, of Martinique. It is the smallest commune of the island.

== Geography ==
=== Climate ===
Fonds-Saint-Denis has a tropical rainforest climate (Köppen climate classification Af). The average annual temperature in Fonds-Saint-Denis is 23.7 °C (74.7 °F). The average annual rainfall is 2,944.9 mm (115.94 in) with July as the wettest month. The temperatures are highest on average in September, at around 25.0 °C (77.0 °F), and lowest in February, at around 22.0 °C (71.6 °F). The highest temperature ever recorded in Fonds-Saint-Denis was 33.4 °C (92.1 °F) on 9 March 2010; the coldest temperature ever recorded was 14.4 °C (57.9 °F) on 12 February 1966.

Climate data for Fonds-Saint-Denis (1991–2020 averages, extremes 1915−present)
Month	Jan	Feb	Mar	Apr	May	Jun	Jul	Aug	Sep	Oct	Nov	Dec	Year
Record high °C (°F)	30.0 (86.0)	33.1 (91.6)	33.4 (92.1)	33.2 (91.8)	32.0 (89.6)	31.8 (89.2)	31.0 (87.8)	32.0 (89.6)	32.9 (91.2)	32.4 (90.3)	31.4 (88.5)	30.1 (86.2)	33.4 (92.1)
Mean daily maximum °C (°F)	24.5 (76.1)	24.7 (76.5)	25.6 (78.1)	26.6 (79.9)	27.2 (81.0)	26.7 (80.1)	26.5 (79.7)	27.3 (81.1)	28.0 (82.4)	27.7 (81.9)	26.5 (79.7)	25.2 (77.4)	26.4 (79.5)
Daily mean °C (°F)	22.1 (71.8)	22.0 (71.6)	22.6 (72.7)	23.5 (74.3)	24.3 (75.7)	24.2 (75.6)	24.2 (75.6)	24.7 (76.5)	25.0 (77.0)	24.8 (76.6)	23.9 (75.0)	22.9 (73.2)	23.7 (74.7)
Mean daily minimum °C (°F)	19.7 (67.5)	19.4 (66.9)	19.7 (67.5)	20.4 (68.7)	21.3 (70.3)	21.8 (71.2)	21.9 (71.4)	22.1 (71.8)	22.0 (71.6)	21.8 (71.2)	21.3 (70.3)	20.5 (68.9)	21.0 (69.8)
Record low °C (°F)	14.8 (58.6)	14.4 (57.9)	15.2 (59.4)	15.0 (59.0)	16.6 (61.9)	17.0 (62.6)	16.4 (61.5)	17.0 (62.6)	17.2 (63.0)	16.8 (62.2)	17.8 (64.0)	16.4 (61.5)	14.4 (57.9)
Average precipitation mm (inches)	237.6 (9.35)	164.7 (6.48)	129.1 (5.08)	142.8 (5.62)	166.7 (6.56)	241.3 (9.50)	354.7 (13.96)	347.2 (13.67)	308.5 (12.15)	290.3 (11.43)	302.8 (11.92)	259.2 (10.20)	2,944.9 (115.94)
Average precipitation days (≥ 1.0 mm)	23.4	18.8	16.6	15.2	15.6	20.6	24.3	23.4	20.3	20.3	21.4	21.7	241.5
Source: Météo-France

== See also ==
- Communes of Martinique
