= Le Morne-Vert =

- Commune
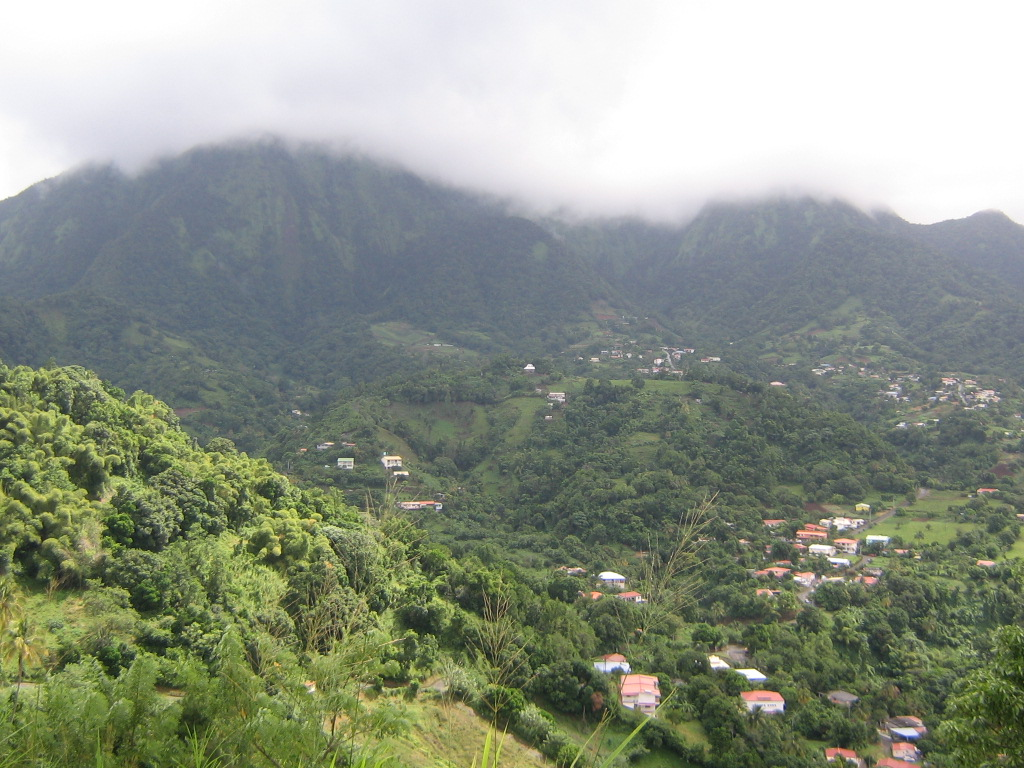
- General view of Le Morne-Vert and the Pitons du Carbet

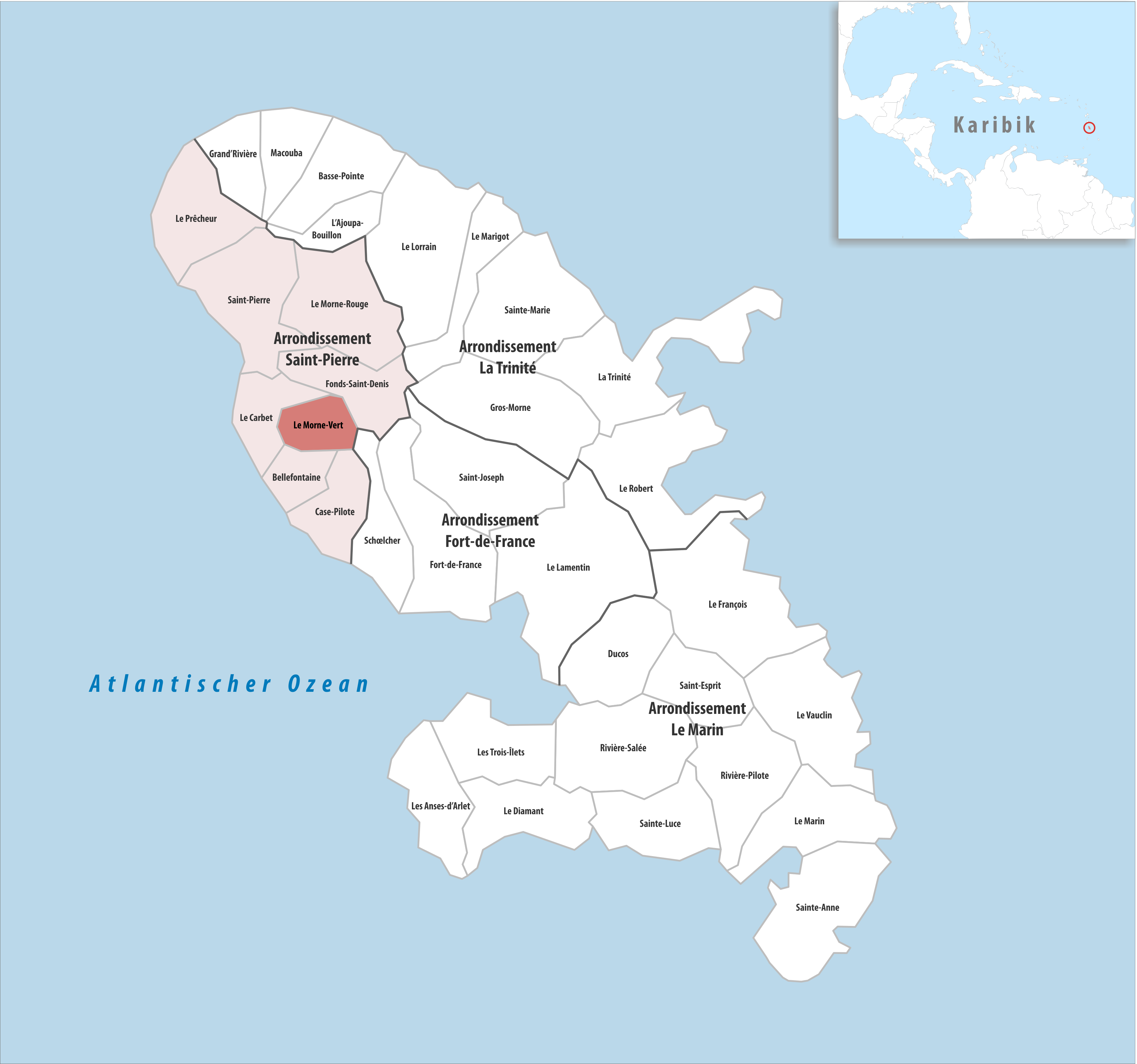
- Location of the commune (in red) within Martinique
- Location of Le Morne-Vert
- Location within France
- Coordinates: 14°42′25″N 61°08′40″W
- Country: France
- Overseas region and department: Martinique
- Arrondissement: Saint-Pierre
- Intercommunality: CA Pays Nord Martinique

Government
  - Mayor (2021–2026): Angèle Serbin
- Area^{1}: 13.37 km^{2} (5.16 sq mi)
- Population (2023): 1,718
  - Density: 128.5/km^{2} (332.8/sq mi)
- Time zone: UTC−04:00 (AST)
- INSEE/Postal code: 97233 /97226
- ^{1} French Land Register data, which excludes lakes, ponds, glaciers > 1 km^{2} (0.386 sq mi or 247 acres) and river estuaries.

Le Morne-Vert (French pronunciation: [lə mɔʁn vɛʁ]) is a village and commune in the French overseas department of Martinique.

Euroleague champion basketball player Mathias Lessort was raised in Le Morne-Vert.

== See also ==
- Communes of the Martinique department
