= William Anderson (artist) =

Scottish artist

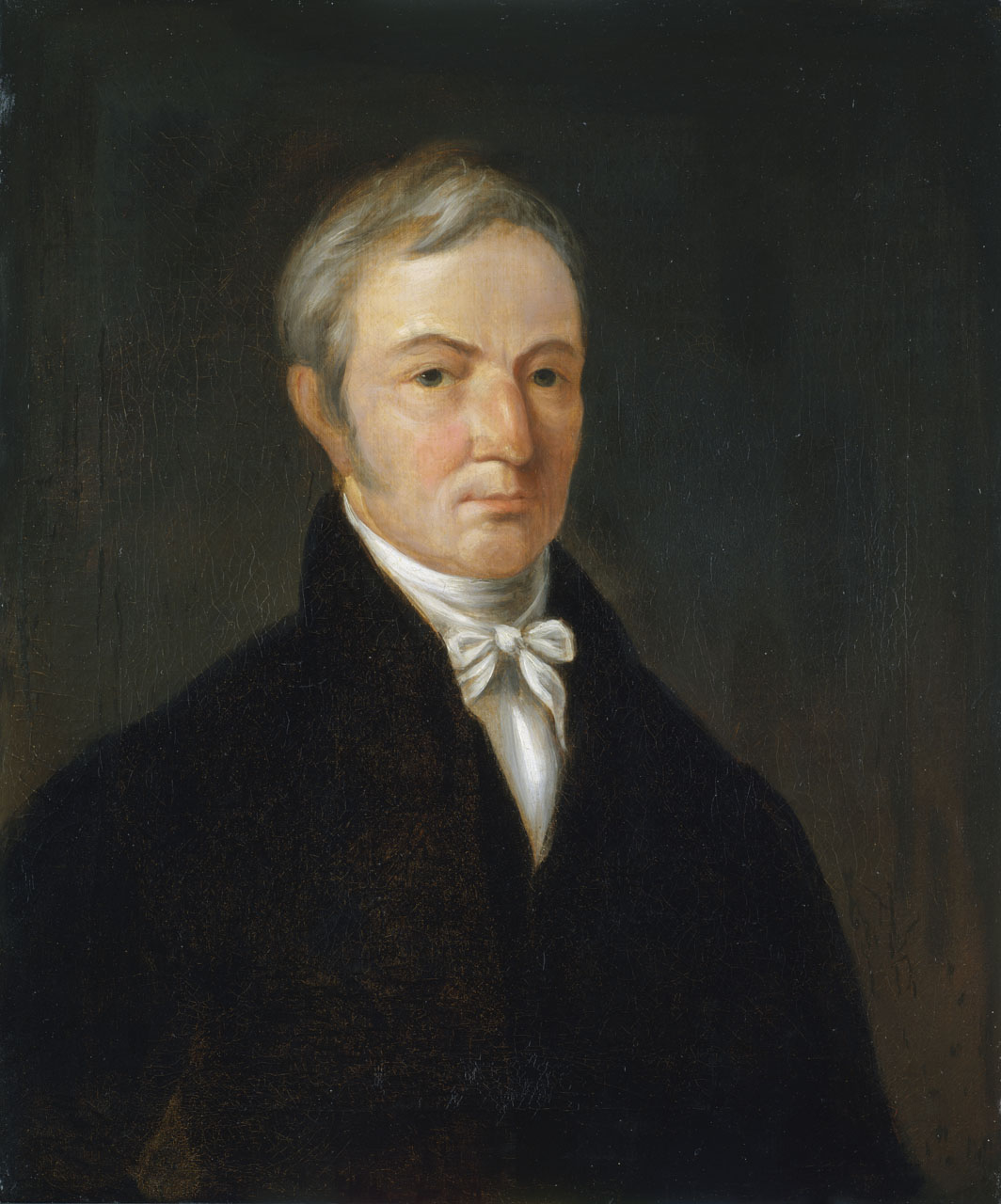
Self-portrait of Anderson

William Anderson (1757 – 27 May 1837) was a Scottish artist who specialised in marine art. He was well-regarded for his detailed and accurate portraits of ships under sail, exhibiting his works annually in London between 1787 and 1811 and then occasionally until 1834. Anderson influenced other artists, notably John Ward and others of the Hull school.

== Life ==
Anderson's early life is obscure, but he is known to have trained as a shipwright before moving to London to become a maritime painter when he was about 30. His training served him well as a painter, providing "a practical nautical knowledge" of his subjects. He earned a reputation for "accuracy and refinement of detail" and was admired for his bright, clear colours. He worked in both oils and watercolours.

He based his style on that of well-known Dutch maritime painters of the 17th century. He first exhibited at the Royal Academy in 1787 and the Royal Institution in 1810, and continued to exhibit annually until 1811. He then exhibited intermittently until 1834. His best work was executed in the years 1790–1810, during the French Revolutionary and Napoleonic Wars, at which time the demand for naval paintings was high. His painting was not restricted to marine subjects and included an exhibit in 1822 of a painting depicting the Battle of Waterloo. Like other artists of the time, Anderson's paintings of marine incidents were often based on sketches by participants and were bought by individuals who had risen in social standing and wealth during the wars.

Commissions that took Anderson back north introduced him to the Hull school of painters, notably influencing the young John Ward (1798–1849), who copied at least one of Anderson's paintings. He was also a friend and possibly a collaborator of the painter Julius Caesar Ibbetson (1759–1817). His work was influenced by his travels in the North, which led to depictions of Berwick-on-Tweed and Tynemouth. His last exhibit was of Lord Howe's fleet at Spithead at the Royal Academy in 1834, the last of 45 paintings that he exhibited there. He died in London on 27 May 1837.

== Works ==
Most of Anderson's pictures were executed at a small size and showed scenes of shipping on rivers. Works shown at exhibitions include A View of Berwick-on-Tweed and A View of Tynemouth. His history paintings include The Battle of Waterloo, The Capture of Fort Louis, Martinique, 1794, which shows the attack by Commander Robert Faulknor of HMS Zebra on Fort Saint Louis in Martinique, The Battle of Cape Finisterre, The First Battle of Groix and The Battle of the Nile . Other paintings include Shipping on the Thames at Deptford and View at the Mouth of the Thames. He also contributed drawings, perhaps of marine topics, for the engravings in Rees's Cyclopædia.

Selected works

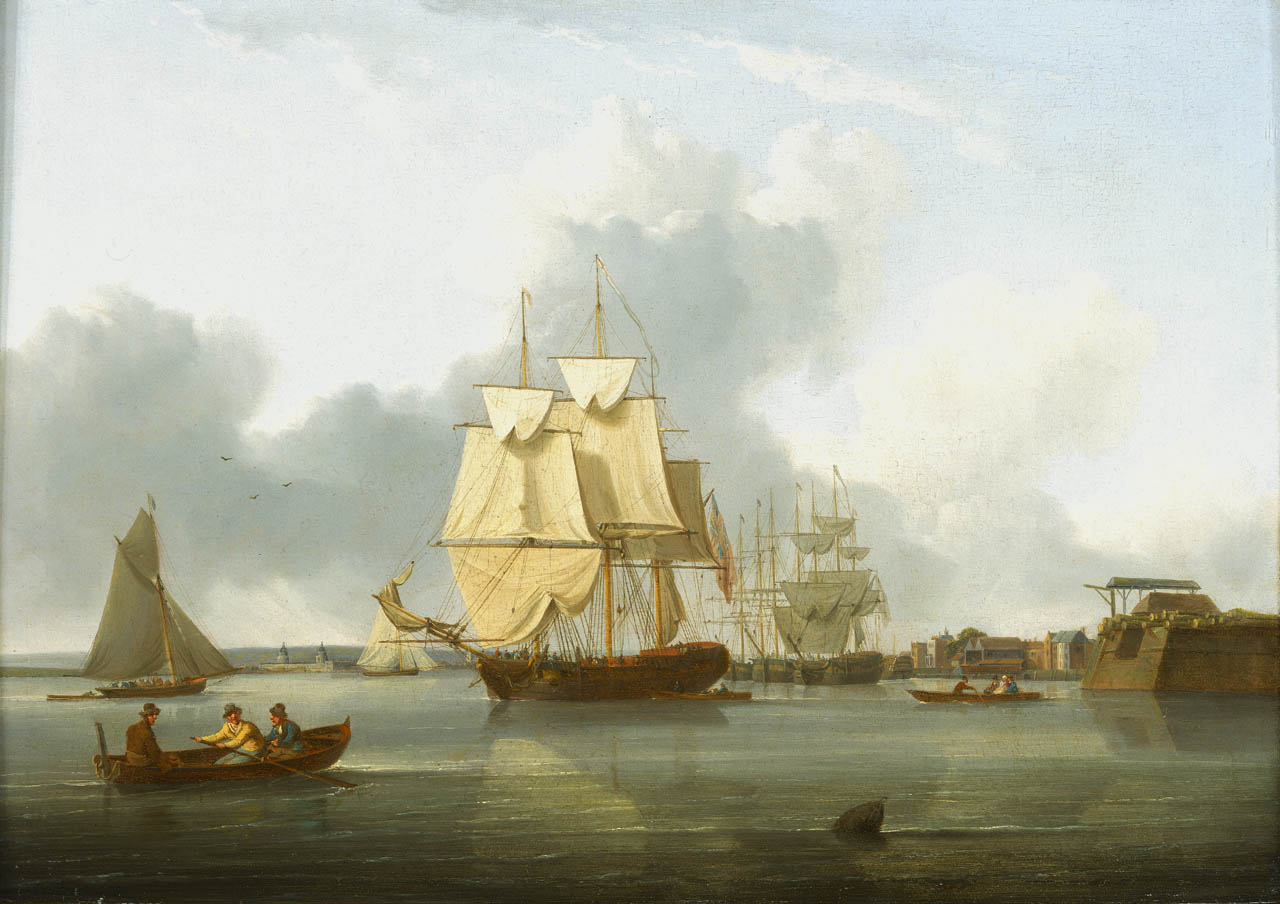
Shipping on the Thames off Deptford

Capture of Fort Saint Louis, Martinique, 1794

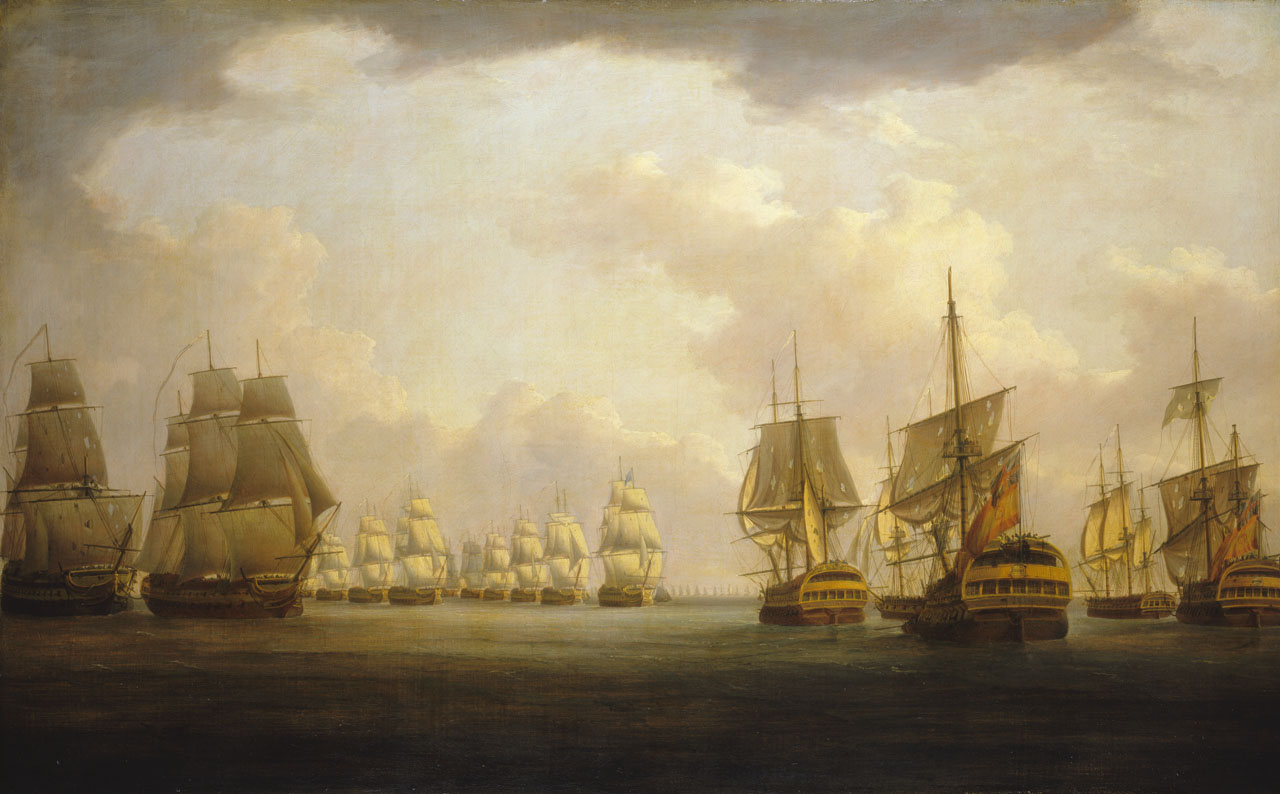
The Battle of Cape Finisterre

== Family ==
Anderson and his wife Sarah had two sons, William and George. Anderson's son, William Guido Anderson, served in the Royal Navy and was fatally wounded at the Battle of Copenhagen in 1801, as a midshipman on HMS Bellona. His other son, George Anderson, was also a painter.
