= Statue of the Empress Joséphine =

Former public statue in Fort-de-France, Martinique

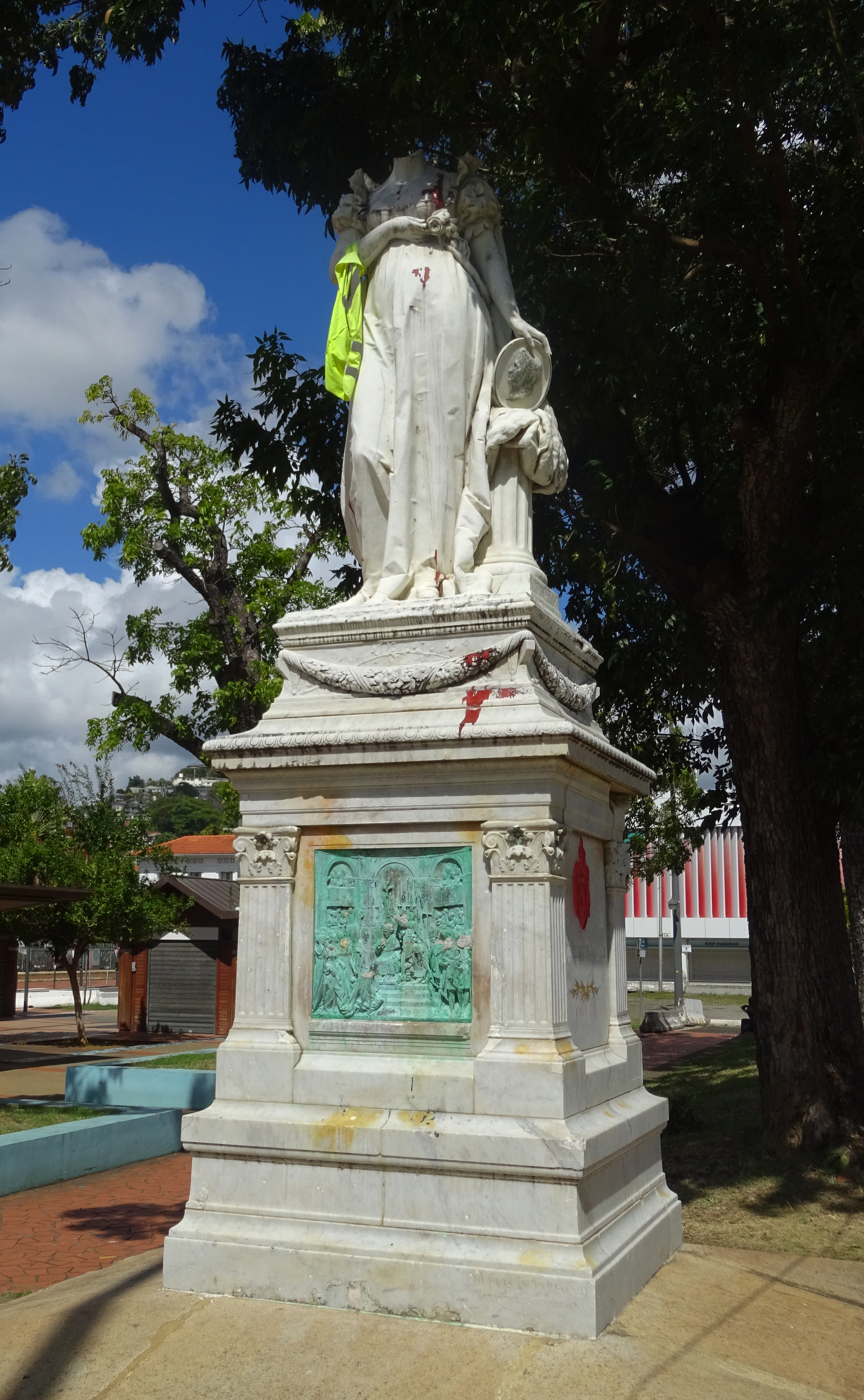
- The statue in 2019
- Artist: Gabriel Vital Dubray
- Year: 1859
- Medium: Marble
- Location: La Savane, Fort-de-France, Martinique, France

A statue of the Empress Joséphine was installed in Fort-de-France, Martinique, from 1859 until 2020. It commemorated Empress Joséphine (the first wife of Napoleon), who was born on Martinique, and was commissioned by her grandson Napoleon III from the sculptor Gabriel Vital Dubray. In 2020 it was destroyed by activists during the George Floyd protests.

== History ==
On 21 September 1991 the statue was decapitated; its head was never found. On 26 July 2020 the statue was torn down by "anti-racism protesters". This was condemned by public officials; however, a police source told the press that they had received orders not to interfere with the protesters. Around the same time the protesters also destroyed a nearby statue of Pierre Belain d'Esnambuc, erected in 1935, and several months prior, in April, they destroyed two statues of Victor Schœlcher, claiming that the authorities should honour black emancipation leaders instead of the colonial heritage.

== See also ==
- List of monuments and memorials removed during the George Floyd protests § France
