= Roman Catholic Archdiocese of Fort-de-France–Saint-Pierre =

Church district in Fort-de-France, Martinique

Archdiocese of Saint-Pierre and Fort-de-France Archidioecesis Sancti Petri et Arcis Gallicae Archidiocèse de Saint-Pierre et Fort-de-France
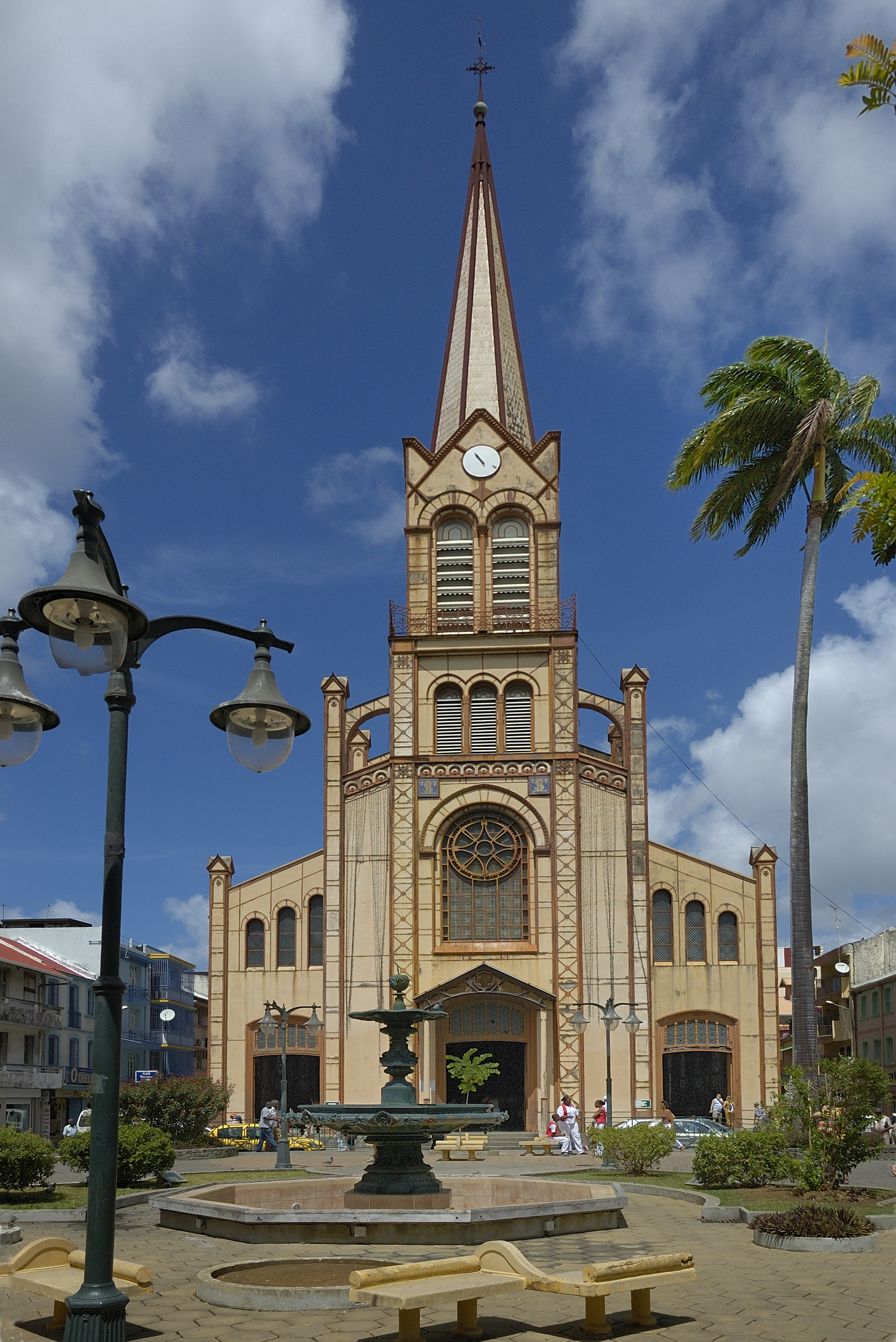
- Cathédrale Saint-Louis

Location
- Country: Martinique, France
- Headquarters: Fort-de-France
- Coordinates: 14°36′34″N 61°04′35″W

Statistics
- Area: 1,080 km^{2} (420 sq mi)
- Population: Total; Catholics: (as of 2006); 390,000; 312,000 (80.0%)

Information
- Denomination: Catholic
- Sui iuris church: Latin Church
- Rite: Roman Rite
- Established: September 27, 1850; 174 years ago
- Cathedral: St. Louis Cathedral
- Language: French

Current leadership
- Pope: Leo XIV
- Bishop: David Macaire, O.P.
- Bishops emeritus: Gilbert Marie Michel Méranville Archbishop Emeritus (2015-)

Website
- martinique.catholique.fr

The Archdiocese of Saint-Pierre and Fort-de-France (Latin: Archidioecesis Sancti Petri et Arcis Gallicae; French: Archidiocèse de Saint-Pierre et Fort-de-France), more simply known as the Archdiocese of Fort-de-France, is a Latin Church ecclesiastical territory or archdiocese of the Catholic Church in the Caribbean. The archdiocese comprises the entirety of the French overseas department of Martinique.

A metropolitan archdiocese, its ecclesiastical province includes the suffragan dioceses of Cayenne and Basse-Terre, and all are members of the Antilles Episcopal Conference.

Archbishop Gilbert Marie Michel Méranville's retirement for age reasons was accepted by Pope Francis on Saturday, 7 March 2015; he is succeeded by Msg. David Macaire, O.P., a Dominican priest who until then had been serving as prior of the convent La Sainte-Baume, in Toulon, France and as of now, the incumbent prelate.

As of 2006, the diocese contained 47 parishes, 35 active diocesan priests, 23 religious priests and 310,000 Catholics. It also has 171 Women Religious and 33 Religious Brothers.

== History ==
The diocese received its present status on 27 September 1850, when the Apostolic Prefecture of Îles de la Terre Ferme (which had lost French Guiana in 1731) was promoted from the missionary status of Apostolic Prefecture to Diocese of Martinique (Latin: Dioecesis Martinicensis; French: Diocèse de la Martinique), but also lost territory to establish the Diocese of Guadeloupe et Basse-Terre.

1853.09.12, it was renamed as Diocese of Saint-Pierre, 1902.05.08 again as Diocese of Fort-de-France–Saint-Pierre.

It was elevated to an archdiocese on 26 September 1967.

== Bishops ==
=== Episcopal incumbents ===
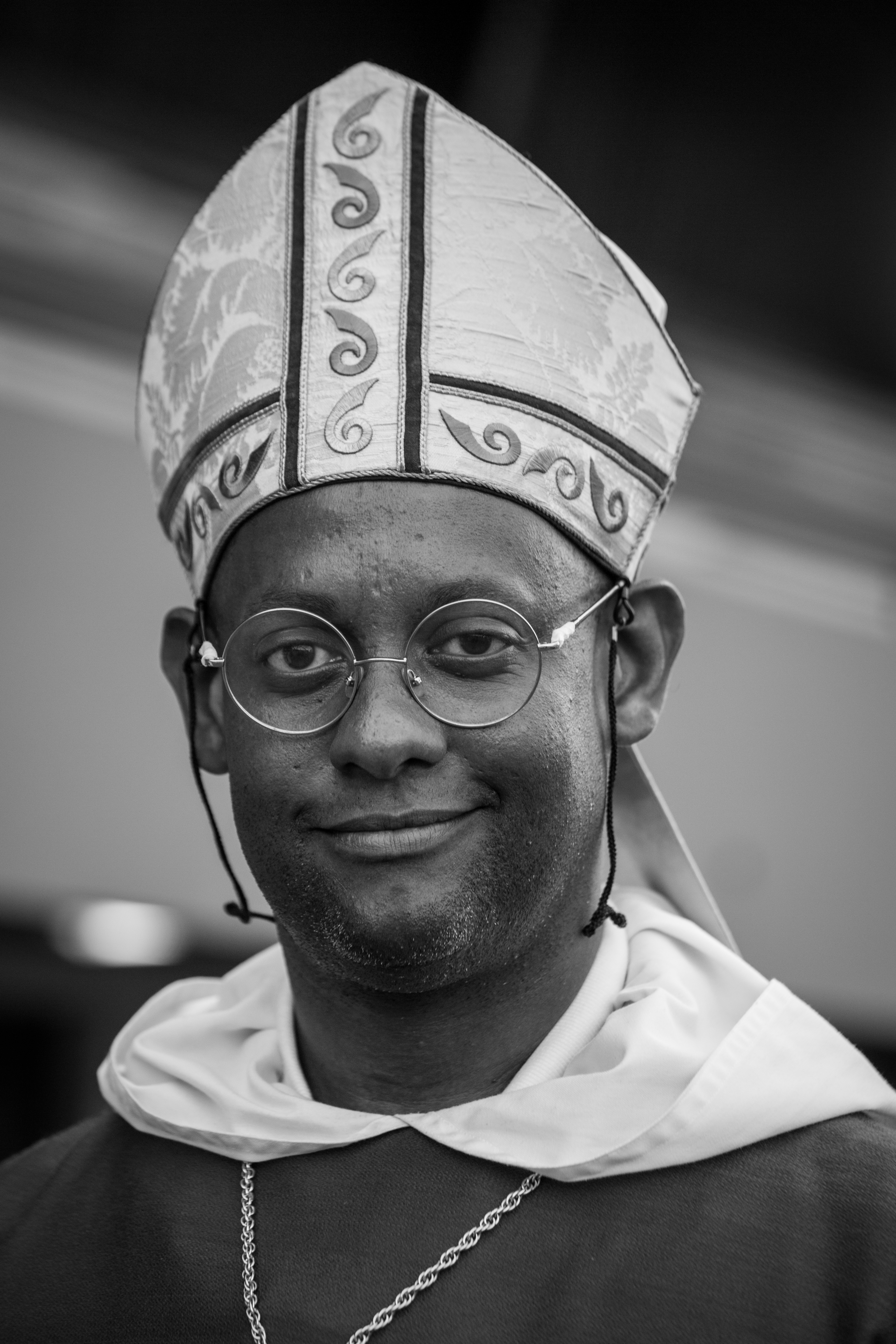
Arch-bishop David Macaire

Bishops of Saint-Pierre

- Etienne Jean François Le Herpeur (1850–1858; till 1853 as Bishop of Martinique)
- Louis-Martin Porchez (1858–1860)
- Amand-Joseph Fava (1871–1875)
- Julien-François-Pierre Carmené (1875–1897)
- Étienne-Joseph-Frédéric Tanoux (1898–1899)
- Maurice-Charles-Alfred de Cormont (1899–1902 see below)

Bishops of Fort-de-France–Saint-Pierre

- Maurice-Charles-Alfred de Cormont (see above 1902–1911)
- Joseph Félix François Malleret C.S.Sp. (1912–1914)
- Paul-Louis-Joseph Lequien (1915–1941)
- Henri-Marie-François Varin de la Brunelière C.S.Sp. (1941–1967 see below)

Metropolitan Archbishops of Fort-de-France–Saint-Pierre

- Henri-Marie-François Varin de la Brunelière C.S.Sp. (see above 1967–1972)
- Maurice Rigobert Marie-Sainte (1972–2004)
- Gilbert Marie Michel Méranville (2004–2015)
- David Macaire, O.P. (7 March 2015–present)

=== Auxiliary bishop ===
- Maurice Rigobert Marie-Sainte (1968–1972), appointed Archbishop here

== Churches ==
- Our Lady of the Assumption Church at Sainte-Marie, Martinique
