= Picq =

Picq is a surname. Notable people with the surname include:

- Ardant du Picq (1821–1870), French Army officer and military theorist
- Charles Le Picq (1744–1806), French dancer and choreographer
- Pierre-Henri Picq, architect of St. Louis Cathedral, Fort-de-France
- Stéphane Picq (1965–2025), French composer of video game music
