= Maurice Rigobert Marie-Sainte =

- Archbishop of Fort-de-France–Saint-Pierre
- Church: Catholic Church
- Archdiocese: Archdiocese of Fort-de-France–Saint-Pierre
- In office: 4 July 1972 – 8 January 2004
- Predecessor: Henri Varin de la Brunelière
- Successor: Gilbert Marie Michel Méranville
- Previous posts: Titular Bishop of Sicilibba (1968-1972); Auxiliary Bishop of Fort-de-France–Saint-Pierre (1968-1972)

Orders
- Ordination: 21 December 1955
- Consecration: 12 October 1969 by Henri Varin de la Brunelière

Personal details
- Born: 4 January 1928 Balata, Fort-de-France, Martinique, French West Indies, French Empire
- Died: 27 August 2017 (aged 89) Sainte-Anne, Martinique, France

Maurice Rigobert Marie-Sainte, (4 January 1928 – 27 August 2017), born in Fort-de-France, was a Martinican Roman Catholic prelate, who was the Archbishop of Fort-de-France and Saint-Pierre from 1972 to 2004.

== Early life ==
Monsignor Marie-Sainte was born Maurice Rigobert Marie-Sainte, a native of Fort-de-France, Martinique on 4 January 1928. Maurice was the second child of a family of 7 including 5 brothers and two sisters.

== Life Path ==
On 21 December 1955 Maurice was ordained a priest. On 12 October 1969 he was ordained bishop by Monsignor Henri Varin de la Brunelière. He succeeded Monsignor Henri Varin de la Brunelière as Archbishop Emeritus of Fort-de-France and Saint-Pierre. Being the youngest in Martinique to become archbishop in his diocese of origin at 41, he was also the first black person in France and all of French dependencies around the world in this position. His successor was Monsignor Michel Méranville who replaced him upon his retirement in 2004.

== Death ==
Monsignor Marie-Sainte died peacefully at the age of 89 on the morning of Sunday 27 August 2017 in Sainte-Anne, Martinique (France).
