= Roman Catholic Diocese of Cayenne =

Catholic diocese in French Guiana

Coordinates: 4°56′24″N 52°19′53″W

Diocese of Cayenne Dioecesis Caiennensis Diocèse de Cayenne
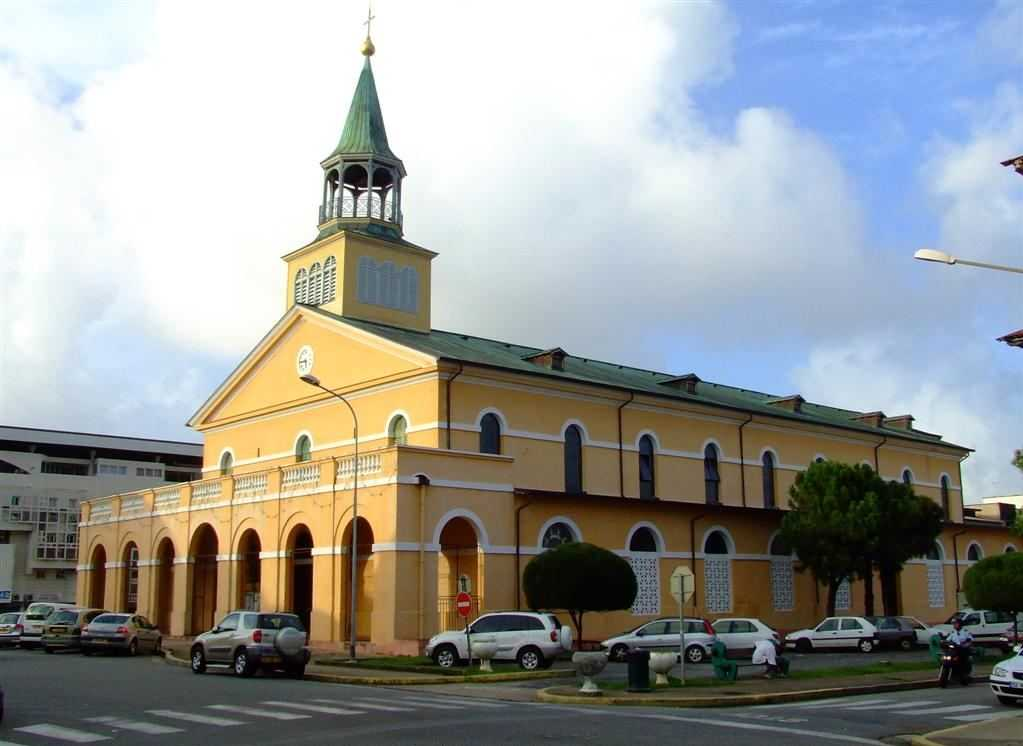
- Cayenne Cathedral

Location
- Country: French Guiana, France
- Ecclesiastical province: Fort-de-France
- Metropolitan: Archdiocese of Fort-de-France

Statistics
- Area: 1,780 km^{2} (690 sq mi)
- Population: Total; Catholics: (as of 2013); 260,000; 188,000 (72.3%)
- Parishes: 26

Information
- Denomination: Roman Catholic
- Rite: Latin Rite
- Cathedral: Cayenne Cathedral

Current leadership
- Pope: Leo XIV
- Bishop: Alain Ransay
- Metropolitan Archbishop: David Macaire
- Bishops emeritus: Emmanuel Marie Philippe Louis Lafont

Website
- website of the Diocese

The Roman Catholic Diocese of Cayenne (Latin: Dioecesis Caiennensis; French: Diocèse de Cayenne) (erected 1651, as the Prefecture Apostolic of French Guiana-Cayenne) is a suffragan diocese of the Archdiocese of Fort-de-France. It was elevated on to the Vicariate Apostolic of French Guiana-Cayenne on 10 January 1933 and to the Diocese of Cayenne on 29 February 1956. The seat of the bishop is in Cayenne Cathedral.

== Ordinaries ==
- Giustino Fabre (1923–1924)
- Leone Delaval, C.S.Sp. (1925–1932)
- Pierre-Marie Gourtay, C.S.Sp. (1933–1944)
- Alfred Aimé Léon Marie, C.S.Sp. (1945–1973)
- François-Marie Morvan, C.S.Sp. (1973–1998)
- Louis Albert Joseph Roger Sankalé (1998–2004), appointed Coadjutor Bishop of Nice
- Emmanuel Lafont (2004–2020)
- Alain Ransay (2021–present)

== See also ==
- List of Roman Catholic dioceses in South America

== External links and references ==
- Eglise Catholique De Guyane, Diocese De Cayenne official site
- "Diocese of Cayenne". Catholic-Hierarchy.
