= Emmanuel Marie Philippe Louis Lafont =

Catholic bishop (born 1945)

Emmanuel Lafont
- Bishop Emeritrus of Cayenne
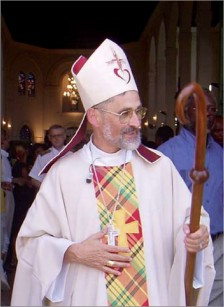
- Church: Catholic Church
- Diocese: Cayenne
- Installed: 18 June 2004
- Term ended: 26 October 2020
- Predecessor: Louis Sankalé
- Successor: Alain Ransay

Orders
- Ordination: 2 August 1970
- Consecration: 29 August 2004 by Michel Méranville

Personal details
- Born: Emmanuel Marie Philippe Louis Lafont; October 26, 1945 (age 80) Paris, France
- Education: Collège Stanislas de Paris
- Alma mater: Pontifical Gregorian University

Emmanuel Marie Philippe Louis Lafont (born 26 October 1945) is a French prelate of the Catholic Church who was Bishop of Cayenne in French Guiana from 2004 to 2020.

Lafont was born in Paris and studied in France and Rome; the Pontifical Gregorian University granted him a Licentiate in Theology. He was ordained to the priesthood for the Archdiocese of Tours on 2 August 1970. His posts have included: assistant parish priest, student ministry, youth ministry for Tours Diocese, and fourteen years of missionary work in Soweto, South Africa. While in Africa as part of the Fidei donum initiative, he also taught at Pretoria's major seminary. On returning to France, he was National Director of the Pontifical Mission Societies for two consecutive terms and served as the Secretary of the French Bishops’ Commission for Missionary Cooperation. From 2002 until his elevation to the episcopacy in 2004, he served as a parish priest in his home archdiocese.

Concerning Lafont's work as a priest in Soweto and as an activist against Apartheid, Cardinal Tomko reported:

He was the only white person, aside from local missionaries, who could drive into Soweto without any gunshots being aimed at his car. I remember the poor apartments, the dirty streets, and the inquiring looks of the people. As soon as they recognized Father Lafont, their faces started to shine. Eventually, the priest had to leave the country because of his protests against the apartheid laws and because of his advocacy on behalf of blacks.

Pope John Paul II named him Bishop of Cayenne on 18 June 2004.

Pope Francis accepted his resignation on 26 October 2020, his 75th birthday.

In April 2021, a canonical investigation was opened against Lafont, and civil complaints were filed. In October 2022, the Dicastery for Bishops handed down a sentence of guilty for sexual abuse. Lafont is confined to a monastery in France for "a life of prayer and repentance". Civil investigations are still ongoing in French Guiana.

== See also ==
- Catholic Church in French Guiana
