= St. Louis Cathedral, Fort-de-France =

St. Louis Cathedral Cathédrale Saint-Louis de Fort-de-France (in French)
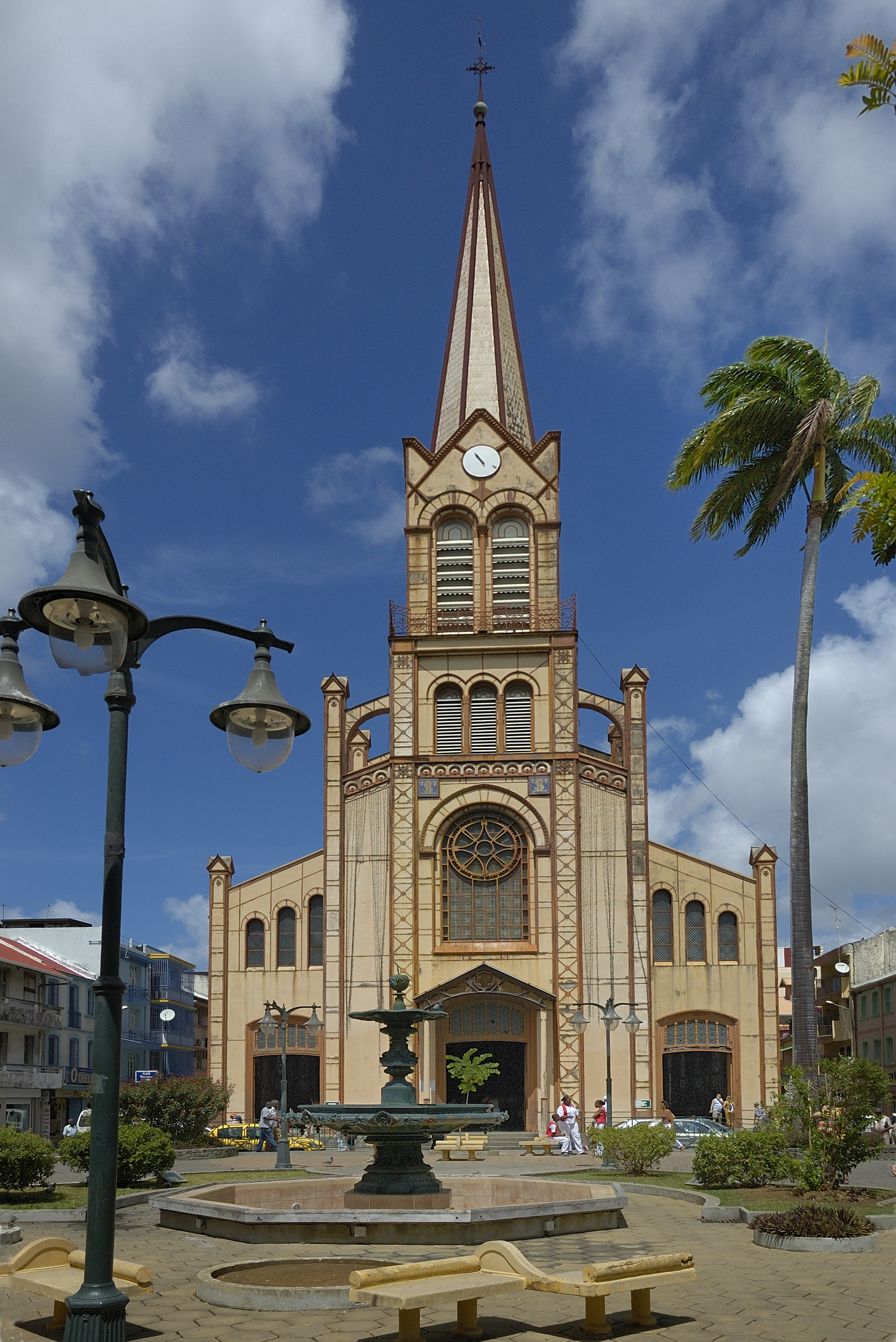
- St. Louis Cathedral, Fort-de-France
- St. Louis Cathedral; Cathédrale Saint-Louis de Fort-de-France (in French)
- 14°36′15″N 61°4′12″W
- Location: Rue Blénac, Fort-de-France
- Country: Martinique, France
- Denomination: Roman Catholic
- Website: martinique.catholique.fr/cathedrale-saint-louis

History
- Status: Cathedral
- Consecrated: 1895

Architecture
- Functional status: Active
- Heritage designation: Monument Historique n° PA00105958, 1990
- Architect: Pierre-Henri Picq
- Architectural type: church
- Style: Romanesque Revival
- Groundbreaking: 1891
- Completed: 1895

Administration
- Archdiocese: Roman Catholic Archdiocese of Fort-de-France

Clergy
- Archbishop: David Macaire

St. Louis Cathedral (French: Cathédrale Saint-Louis de Fort-de-France) is a Catholic cathedral in Martinique, an overseas department of France. It was built in the late 19th-century in the Romanesque Revival style and serves as the cathedral of the Roman Catholic Archdiocese of Fort-de-France. The church is in the downtown area of the capital Fort-de-France, at the intersection of rue Victor Schœlcher and rue Blénac.

The construction of the cathedral began in the mid-17th century and it opened in 1657. Due to natural disasters, such as fire and earthquakes, that have hit Fort-de-France over the years, the current structure dates only to 1895. It was built with an iron frame in order to withstand any further such events. It is the seventh church to be erected on the site; it was built by Pierre-Henri Picq.

== History ==
Before the present cathedral was completed in 1895, a total of six churches had previously been constructed on the site, the first of which was built in 1657. These were all destroyed by either fire, earthquakes or hurricanes. The loss of significant buildings was not uncommon in Fort-de-France, as devastating natural disasters frequently plagued the region. The cathedral that immediately preceded the present one was destroyed by fire in July 1890, a disaster that also obliterated three-quarters of the town. Pierre-Henri Picq was hired to be the architect.

In the mid-1970s, the cathedral underwent an extensive program of restoration and refurbishment. Part of this entailed repainting the exterior to a tan and brown colour. The renovation was completed in 1978. The cathedral is one of the most famous landmarks in the capital and has been labelled "the religious centrepiece" of Martinique.

== Architecture ==
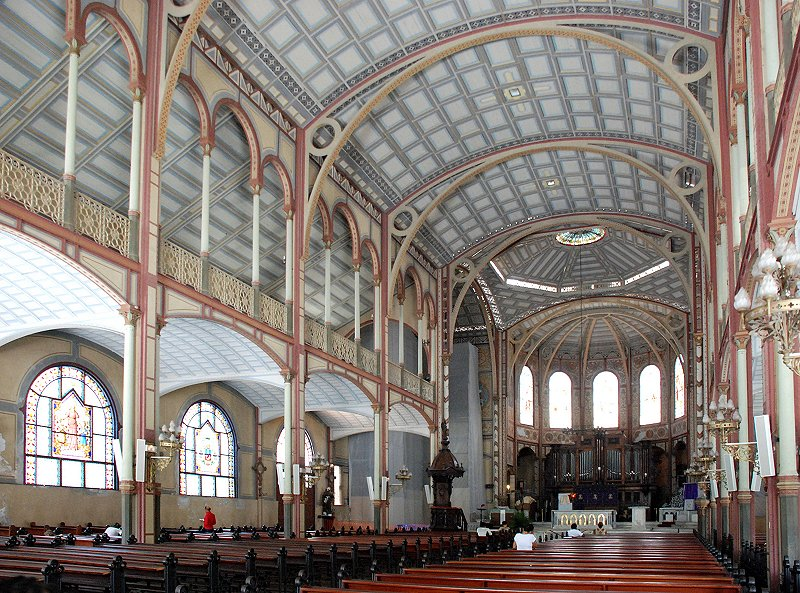
The interior of St. Louis Cathedral, facing towards the altar and sanctuary.

=== Exterior ===
St. Louis Cathedral was built in a Gothic Revival style with rounded arches in the Neo-Romanesque style. The cathedral's façade features a steeple that rises 187 feet (57 m) above the city, while its exterior walls are supported by flying buttresses. Located in front of the cathedral is a small square that contains two royal palms which appear to flank the structure. The building is located directly across the square from the consulate of the United States and is one block northwest from the park La Savane.

The entire structure has a frame of iron beams which support the walls, ceiling and steeple making the church a fine example of architecture from the time of the Industrial Revolution. As a result, the cathedral is referred to in the Caribbean as the "Iron Cathedral" and has been compared to a "Catholic railway station".

=== Interior ===
The interior of the church is noted for its "grand organ", ornate walls, beautiful stained glass windows and balustrade made of iron. Located underneath the choir loft is a crypt containing the tombs of several previous governors of Martinique.
