= John Ward (painter) =

English painter

John Ward (1798–1849) was an English painter from Kingston upon Hull, Yorkshire. He has been described as "the leading marine artist and ship portrait painter in Hull during the first half of the 19th century".

== Biography ==
John Ward was born on 28 December 1798, a son of a master mariner, Abraham Ward, also a painter and his wife Sarah (née Clark). John received an education and was apprenticed as a house painter to Thomas Meggitt. By 1826, Ward was listed in the local Hull Directory as a "House and Ship Painter".

Ward married Esther Leonard (daughter of John Leonard of Hull) on 18 April 1825 in Holy Trinity Church, Hull. They had four daughters. He was initiated as a Freemason. He was influenced by the artist William Anderson. copying some of them before establishing his own style.

Ward exhibited several paintings in 1827 at the Hull and East Riding Institute for the Promotion of the Fine Arts. He subsequently produced small watercolour paintings and some larger oil paintings, of local maritime and shipping scenes.

He also exhibited at the Royal Academy between 1840 and 1847 and at the British Institution between 1843 and 1847. He made many engravings of his own works.

Ward died on 28 September 1849 from cholera. It was not until 1883 that his importance was recognized when the local press briefly described his life.

Many of his works are now in public collections, including the Ferens Art Gallery, Hull Maritime Museum and National Gallery of Art, Washington, D.C..

In 1981 an exhibition of his works was held at the Ferens Art Gallery to coincide with the opening of the Humber Bridge.

=== Gallery ===
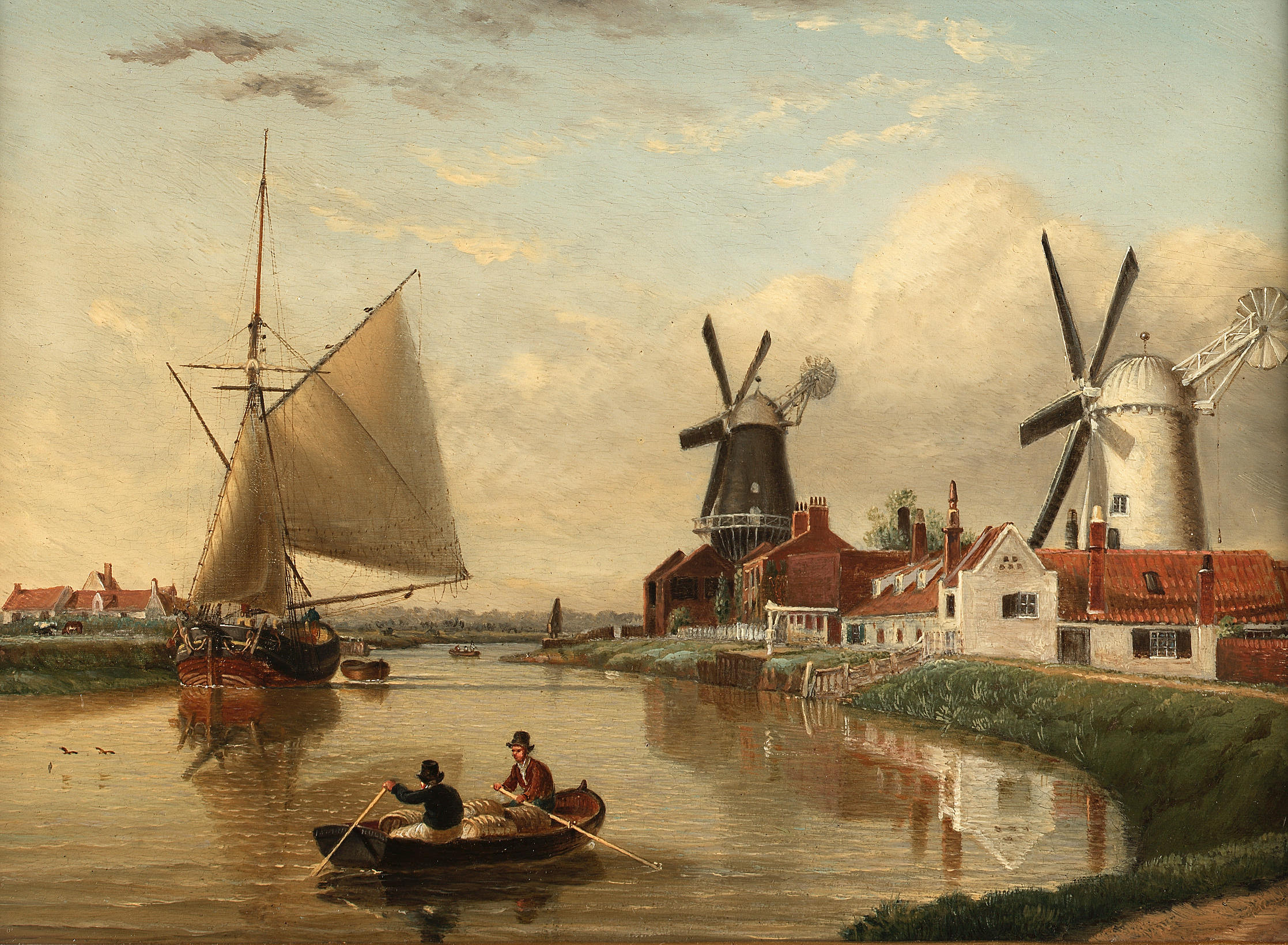
"Stoneferry", oil on panel

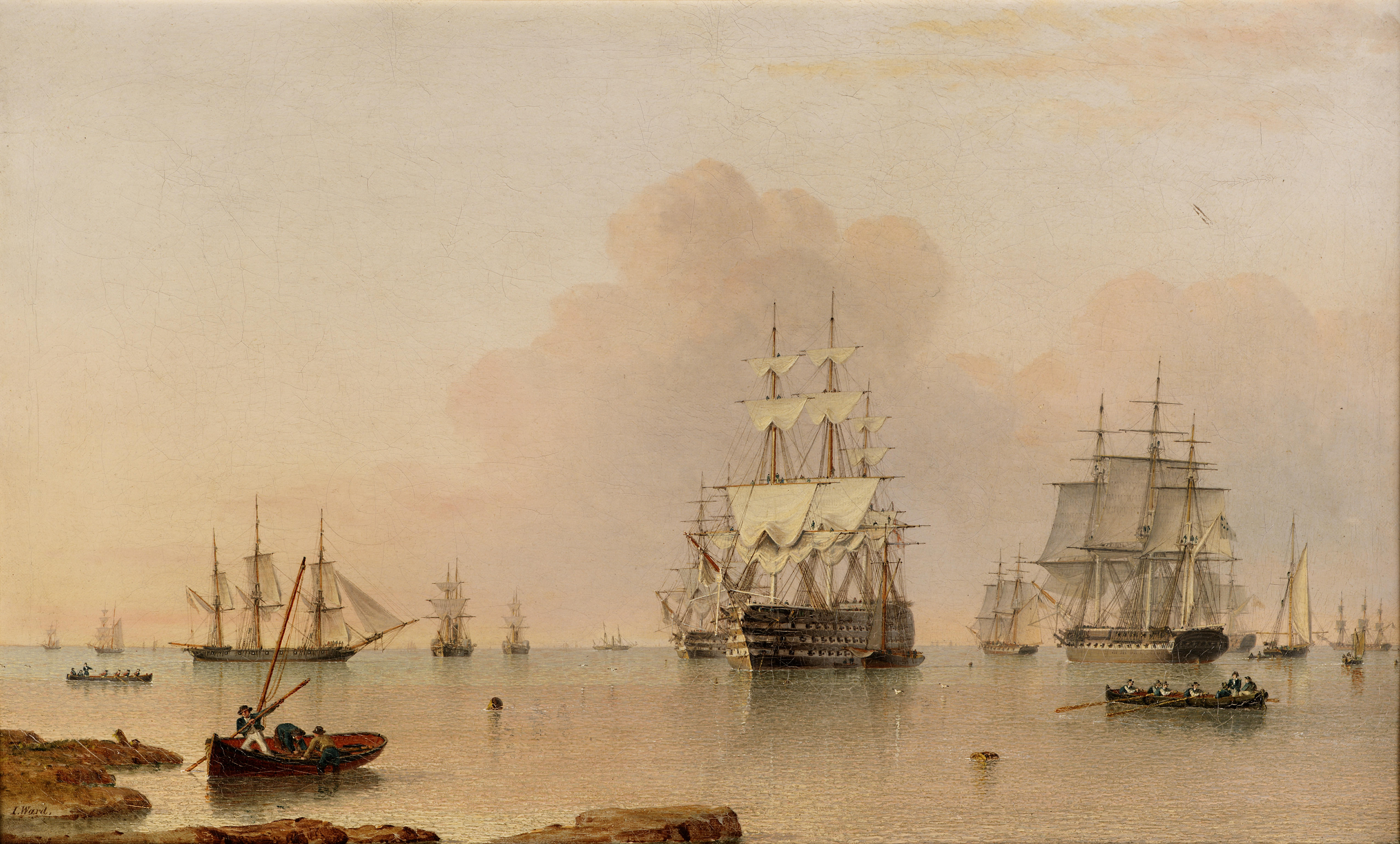
"H.M.S. Britannia at Anchor with the Fleet", oil on canvas

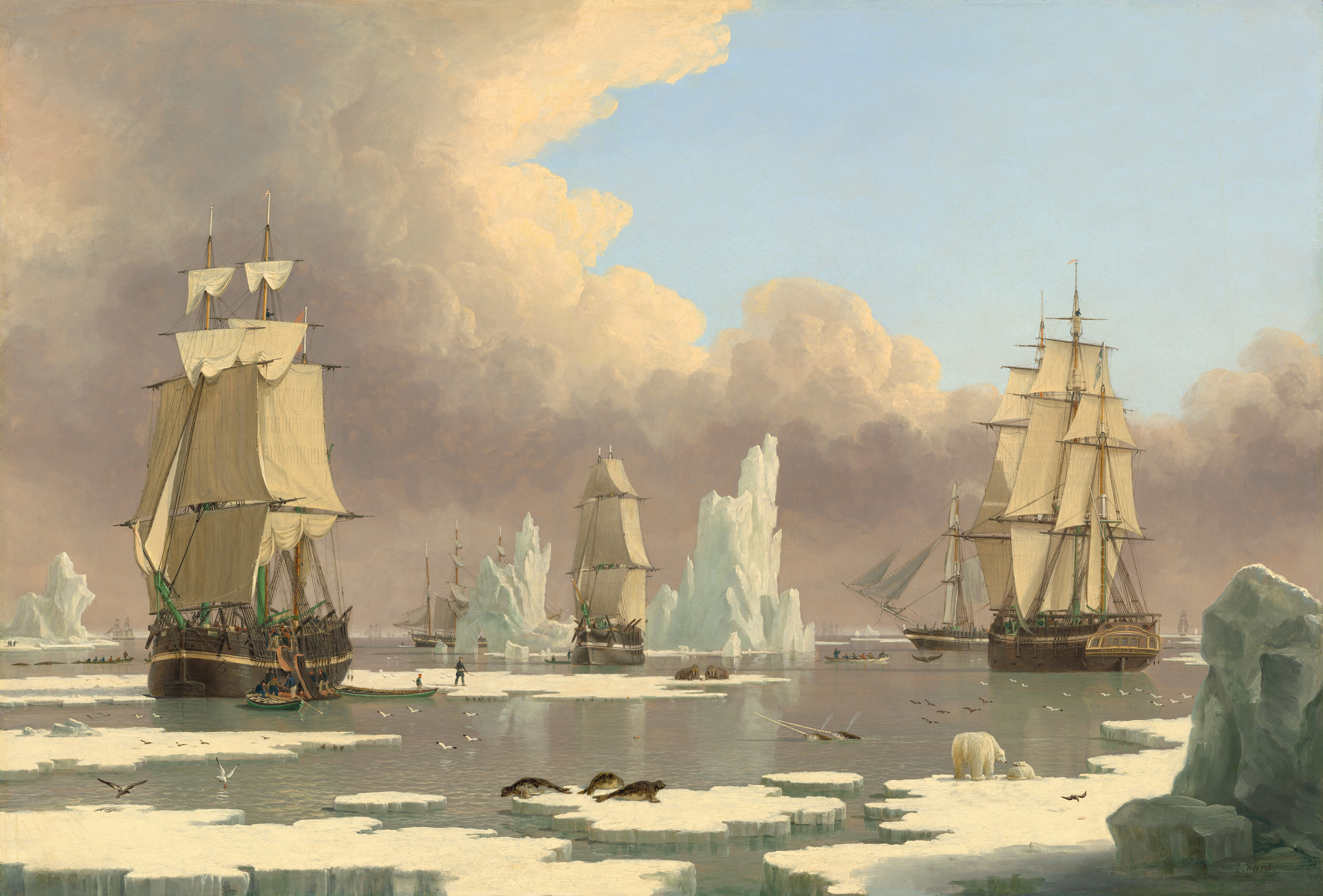
"'The Northern Whale Fishery - The Swan and Isabella", oil on canvas, c. 1840

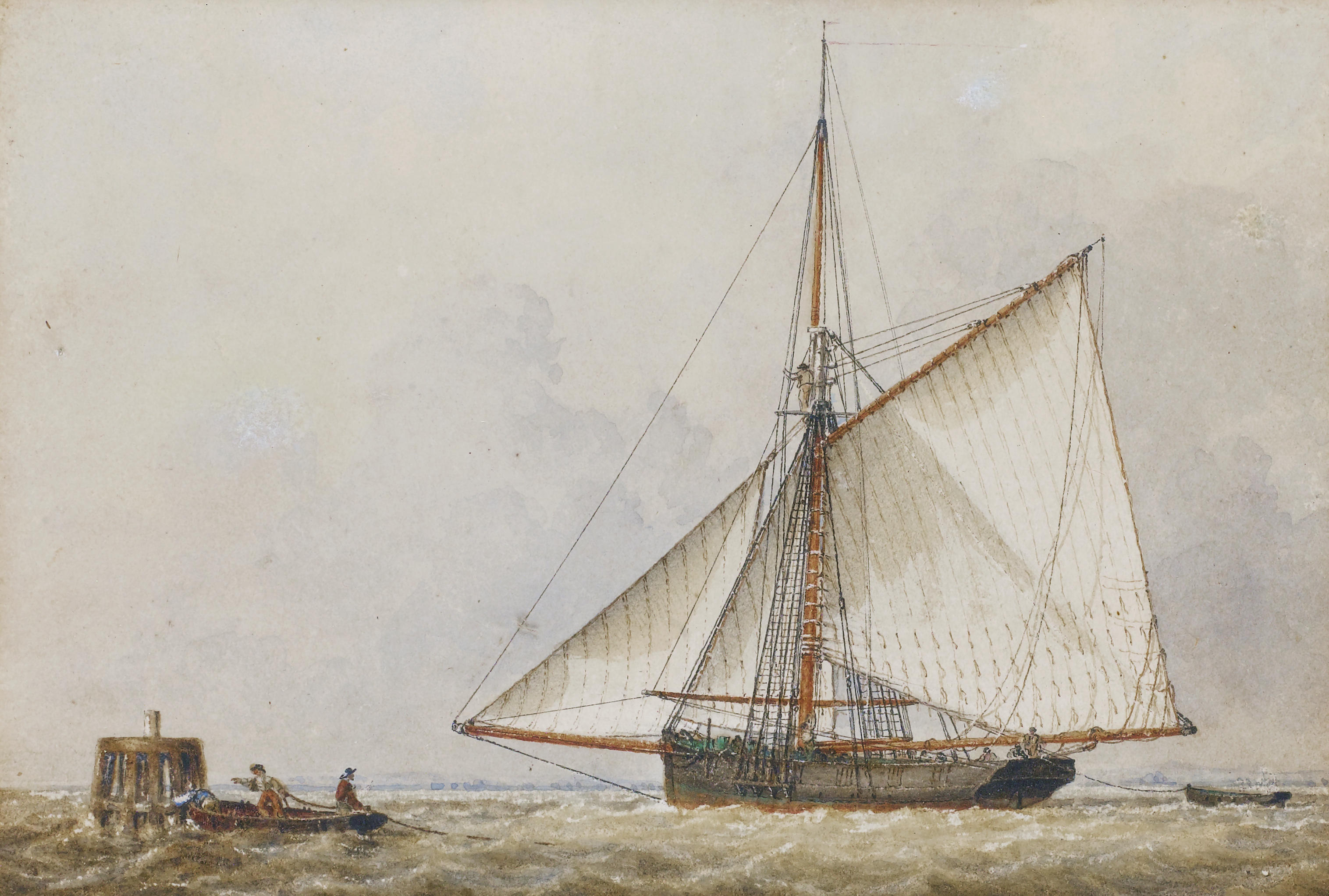
"A trading cutter shortening sail as members of her crew carry a mooring rope to a wooden dolphin nearby", pen, Indian ink and watercolour

== 2009 art theft ==
In June 2009, one of Ward's paintings, "Schooners Ellen Crawford and Dwina" (1843), was stolen from Hull Maritime Museum. The painting, worth £10,000, was recovered three months later after being found hanging on the thief's dining room wall; he had stolen the painting as a present for his artist wife. At his trial, the Crown Court judge described the painting as "part of the heritage of the city of Hull, building on its reputation and art links with the maritime world".
