= Cayenne Cathedral =

- Cathédrale Saint-Sauveur de Cayenne
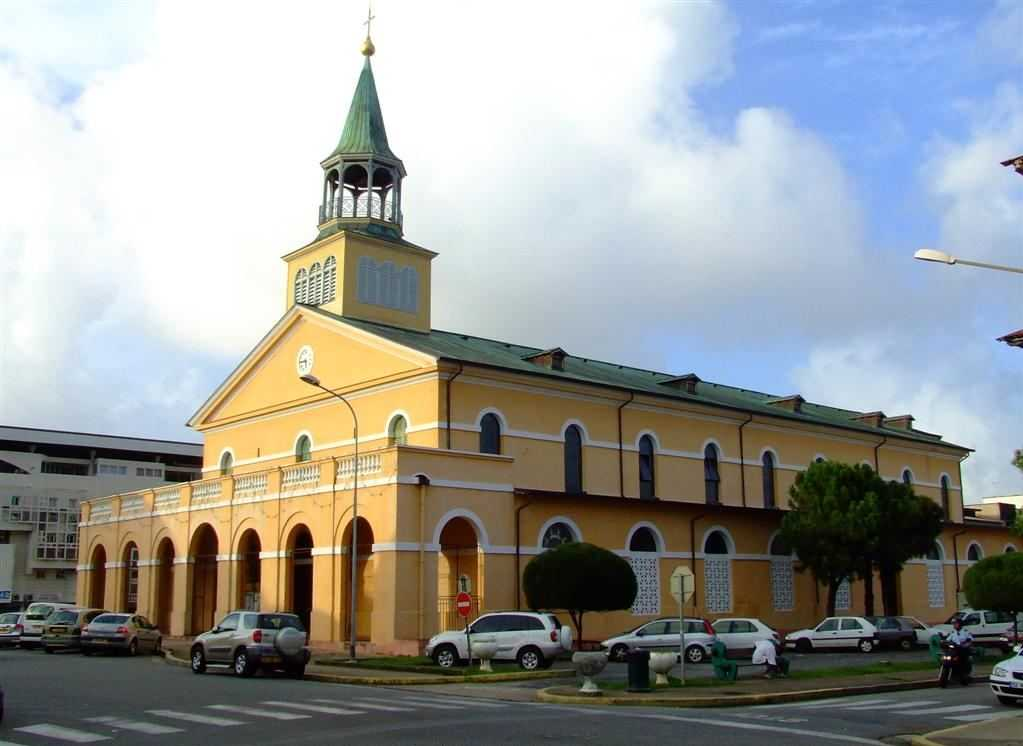
- Cayenne Cathedral
- 4°56′23″N 52°19′54″W
- Location: Cayenne, French Guiana
- Country: France
- Denomination: Roman Catholic Church

History
- Former name: Saint Nicolas Church
- Consecrated: 9 November 1934

Architecture
- Architect: Victor Toubi

Specifications
- Materials: Stone and brick

Cayenne Cathedral (French: Cathédrale Saint-Sauveur de Cayenne) is a Roman Catholic cathedral, seat of the Diocese of Cayenne. It is a national monument of France, located in the town of Cayenne, capital of French Guiana.

== History ==
Construction of the first church started in 1825 and was completed in 1833. It was originally named the Saint Nicolas Church. In 1923, it was decided to replace the church with a stone and brick structure. Construction started in 1925, and was finished in 1933. On 9 November 1934, it was consecrated. The Cayenne Cathedral was enlarged between 1952 and 1954, and is the largest church in French Guiana. It was declared a monument on 29 October 2012.
