= La Savane (Martinique) =

Park in Martinique

Coordinates: 14.6031°N 61.0675°W

La Savane (French pronunciation: [la savan]) is a 12½ acre park located on the Fort-de-France Bay in Fort-de-France, Martinique. It was formerly known as Jardin du Roi (garden of the king) and its first purpose is said to have been to harbor scientific experiments on plants that were new to the colony at that time.

The park has no fence. Its Caribbean gardens face Fort Saint Louis (formerly known as Fort Royal) on the east side. On the west side the park borders the Bibliothèque Schoelcher (or Schoelcher Library), a Romanesque-Byzantine building initially part of the Paris Exposition of 1889, dismantled, shipped to Martinique and re-built in Fort-de-France. La Savane is home to a statue of Joséphine de Beauharnais, born on the island on 23 June 1763, first wife of Napoleon and Empress of France. The Carrara marble statue, created by Vital Dubray, was vandalized and is now missing its head. In 1991, the statue was symbolically decapitated and spattered with red paint. The acts of vandalism were done on the belief that Joséphine had influenced her husband to issue the Law of 20 May 1802, which reinstated slavery in the French colonial empire (including Martinique).The statue was never repaired by the city administration, and every year more red paint was added to it.In July 2020, the statue was torn down and destroyed by rioters in the wake of the George Floyd protests.The park also shelters a tiny colorful market offering exotic items, souvenirs and snacks.
