= Gilbert Marie Michel Méranville =

- Archbishop Emeritus of Fort-de-France–Saint-Pierre
- Church: Catholic Church
- Archdiocese: Archdiocese of Fort-de-France–Saint-Pierre
- In office: 14 November 2003 – 7 March 2015
- Predecessor: Maurice Rigobert Marie-Sainte
- Successor: David Macaire

Orders
- Ordination: 20 December 1959
- Consecration: 18 April 2004 by Maurice Rigobert Marie-Sainte

Personal details
- Born: 4 February 1936 (age 90) Le Vauclin, Martinique, French West Indies, French Empire

Gilbert Marie Michel Méranville (born 4 February 1936) is the Roman Catholic archbishop emeritus of the Archdiocese of Fort-de-France in Martinique. Archbishop Méranville was ordained a priest in 1959, and on 14 November 2003, he succeeded Archbishop Maurice Rigobert Marie-Sainte as the Metropolitan Archbishop of Fort-de-France. His resignation for age reasons was accepted by Pope Francis on Saturday, 7 March 2015. That day, Pope named Father David Macaire, O.P., prior of the Dominican convent of La Sainte-Baume, in Toulon, France, as Archbishop of Fort-de-France.
