= David Macaire =

21st-century Martiniquais Catholic bishop

The Most Reverend David Macaire O.P.
- Archbishop of the Archdiocese of Fort-de-France–Saint-Pierre
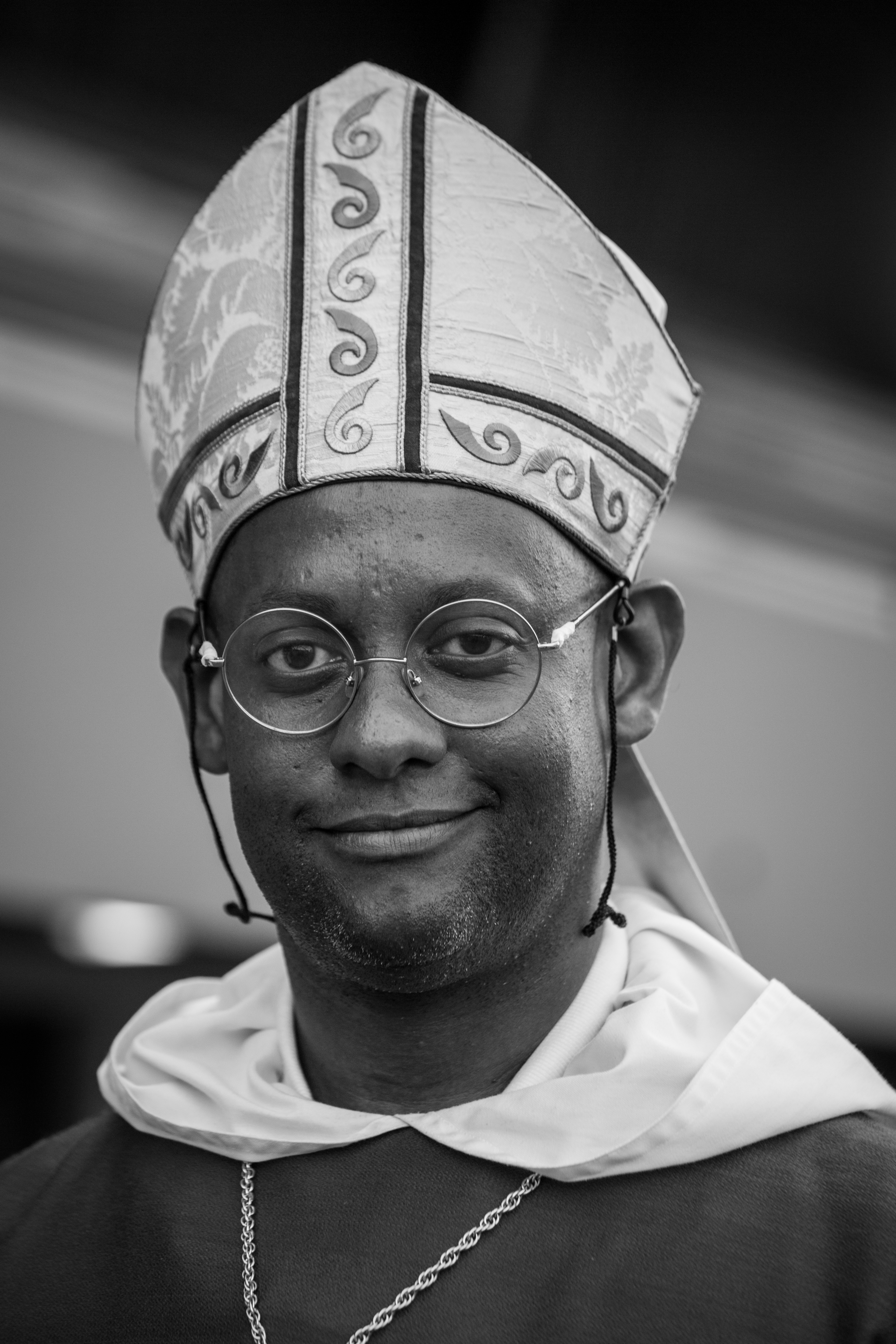
- Macaire in July 2015
- Church: Catholic Church
- Archdiocese: Archdiocese of Fort-de-France–Saint-Pierre
- In office: 2015–
- Predecessor: Gilbert Marie Michel Méranville

Orders
- Ordination: 23 June 2001 by Jean-Louis Bruguès OP
- Consecration: 12 April 2015 by Chibly Langlois
- Rank: Archbishop

Personal details
- Born: 20 October 1969 (age 56) Nanterre, France
- Motto: Jesum ostende (Jesus shows)
- Coat of arms

David Thomas Daniel Macaire OP (born 20 October 1969) is a Martiniquan Catholic prelate who has served as the Archbishop of Fort-de-France–Saint-Pierre since 2015.

== Personal life ==
Macaire was born in Nanterre to Jean-David (Marceau) Macaire and Jenny Macaire, née Léger. His father Jean-David worked as a recipient for P&T, while his mother Jenny works as a school health nurse and as a marriage and family counselor. His parents were devout Catholics and emigrants from Martinique. From a young age Macaire and his family would read and discuss the bible every evening. When he was four months old his family moved back to Martinique.

He attended primary school at the Dominican College of Our Lady of Deliverance at Le Morne-Rouge, Martinique, from 1972-1984, and secondary school at the Schœlcher High School in Fort-de-France, Martinique, from 1984-1987. He then studied at the National School of Equipment Technicians in Montpellier, and then worked as a technical assistant of public works for the state in both mainland France and Martinique from 1988 to 1994. At the age of 25 he left his job to join religious life, feeling called to the Dominican order after going on a religious retreat.

On 17 September 1995 Macaire joined the Dominican Order. He took his final perpetual vows in 1998. On 23 June 2001 he was ordained a priest of order of friars preachers by Jean-Louis Bruguès OP. From 2001 to 2015 Macaire served as prior of the convent of La Sainte-Baume, in Toulon, France. On 7 March 2015 it was announced that Macaire would be succeeding archbishop Gilbert Marie Michel Méranville of the Archdiocese of Fort-de-France–Saint-Pierre. He was consecrated archbishop of the diocese on 12 April 2015, by Haitian cardinal Chibly Langlois, with Marc Aillet and Méranville serving as the co-consecrators. The event took place at the Cathédrale Saint-Louis.
