= Fort Desaix =

Fort in Fort-de-France, Martinique

- Fort-de-France, Martinique in France

Site information
- Type: Vauban fort
- Owner: Government of France
- Controlled by: French Armed Forces

Location
- Coordinates: 14°36′59″N 61°03′55″W

Site history
- Built: 1768–1772
- Built by: Kingdom of France
- In use: 1772–present
- Battles/wars: British invasion of Martinique (1794); British invasion of Martinique (1809)

Garrison information
- Garrison: 33rd Regiment of Marine Infantry

Fort Desaix is a Vauban fort and one of four forts that protect Fort-de-France, the capital of Martinique. The fort was built from 1768 to 1772 and sits on a hill, Morne Garnier, overlooking what was then Fort Royal. Fort Desaix was built in response to the successful British attack on Fort Royal in 1762 and was intended to prevent any future attacker from using Morne Garnier to site cannon that could then bombard Fort Royal from above.

== History ==
The fort took the name Fort Bourbon as early as 1766, Fort la Convention in 1793, Fort George during the British occupations (1793–1802, 1809–1814), and became Fort Desaix in 1802. Napoleon Bonaparte renamed the fort to honor General Louis Desaix (1768–1800). The original fort in the area is Fort Saint Louis, which is located at Fort-de-France, and which is still home to a French naval base. Two other forts were added in the 19th century: Fort Tartenson and Fort Gerbault.

The British captured Fort Desaix twice, first in 1794 and again in 1809.

Construction works on Morne Garnier began already during the Seven Years' War, as early as 1759, but, in the context of the war, progressed slowly. After the war's end, work there took precedence. The French Navy (the Marine) committed to spend about 11 million livre tournois on this fort. On 1 June 1769, an engineer by the name of Le Bœuf proposed the construction of a lunette in front of then Fort Bourbon. Construction was completed in 1780. A 300-meters-long subterranean gallery linked the lunette to the main body of the fort. The lunette was named after the then Governor General of Martinique, the Marquis de Bouillé. During the British attack in March 1794, the lunette resisted for 14 days, after holding off numerous assaults and suffering extensive bombardment. Fort Bourbon surrendered on 22 March, two days after the British captured Fort Royal.

At the time of the British attack on Martinique in 1809, the fort had an irregular pentagonal shape as it followed the terrain. The British besieged Fort Desaix from 10 to 19 February as they emplaced their 14 cannon and 28 mortars and howitzers. They then commenced an unrelenting bombardment that lasted until the French capitulated on 24 February after the British fire had dismounted most of their guns (some 98) and exploded a powder magazine. The French had had some 113 cannon and mortars, and some 1500 to 2200 men at the start of the siege. Their resistance had cost the French over 200 casualties from the bombardment alone. Fort Royal had already surrendered on the 10th, so with the fall of Fort Desaix, all resistance on Martinique ceased. After the battle the British substantially demolished the fort.

A Court of Inquiry in Paris in December 1809 stripped Admiral Louis Thomas Villaret de Joyeuse, the Governor General of Martinique, and some of his subordinates of their rank and honors, holding them responsible for problems with the fortification of Fort Desaix and the loss of the island.

The fort returned to French control in 1814, in a severely reduced state. In 1848 it was restored, but was of limited defensive importance. It was refitted in 1880 and 1905 to house a battery of coastal artillery.

Between 1940 and 1943, while under the administration of the Vichy High Commissioner in the Antilles, Admiral Georges Robert, the fort housed 286 tons of the Bank of France's gold reserves, delivered by the cruiser Émile Bertin. The gold reserve had originally been destined for Canada.

== Today ==
Today, Fort Desaix is the headquarters for the French armed forces in the Antilles and the 33rd Regiment of Marine Infantry, which consists of five companies, two of which are actual line companies.
