= Hôtel de Ville, Fort-de-France =

Town hall in Fort-de-France, France

Hôtel de Ville
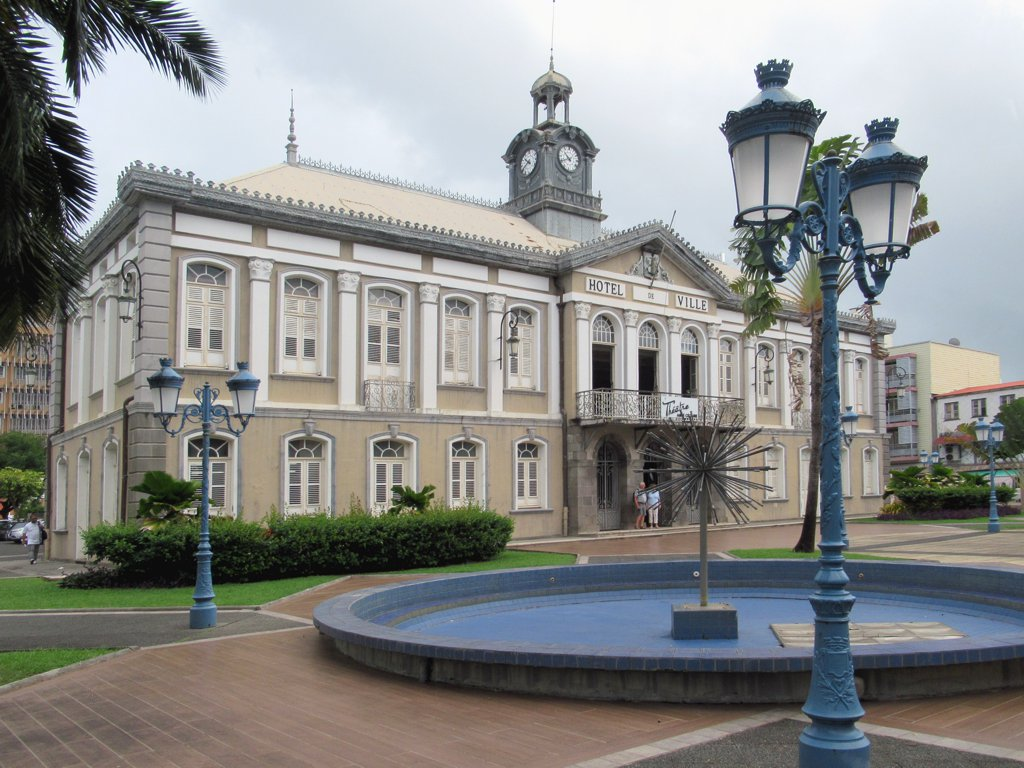
- The main frontage of the Hôtel de Ville in December 2019

General information
- Type: City hall
- Architectural style: Neoclassical style
- Location: Fort-de-France, Martinique
- Coordinates: 14.6066°N 61.0699°W
- Completed: 1901

Design and construction
- Architects: Sieur Krous and Sieur De Laguarigue

Monument historique
- Official name: Hôtel de ville
- Type: Inscrit
- Designated: 1979
- Reference no.: PA00105944

The Hôtel de Ville (French pronunciation: [otɛl də vil], City Hall) is a municipal building in Fort-de-France, Martinique, in the Caribbean Sea, standing on Rue Victor Sévère. It was designated a monument historique by the French government in 1979.

== History ==
The first municipal building in the town was the Maison Commune, on Rue Victor Hugo, which was completed in 1848. In the early 1880s, the town council decided to commission a more substantial building. The site they selected was occupied by the old hospice of the college of Saint-Victor, which dated back to the early 19th century.

Construction started in 1884 but was delayed by a major fire on 22 June 1890 and then by a cyclone on 18 August 1891. The initial design work was undertaken by Sieur Krous but, following the delays, it was taken over by Sieur De Laguarigue. It was designed in the neoclassical style, built in ashlar stone and was officially opened by the mayor, Victor Sévère, on 21 September 1901.

The design involved a symmetrical main frontage of 13 bays facing onto Rue Victor Sévère. The centre section of three bays, which was slightly projected forward, featured three round headed openings on the ground floor, and three French doors with a balcony on the first floor. The wings were fenestrated by segmentally headed windows with keystones on the ground floor and by segmentally headed windows without keystones on the first floor. The windows on the first floor were flanked by Ionic order pilasters supporting a frieze, a series of panels and a cornice with iron fretwork. Above the central section, there was a pediment with a coat of arms in the tympanum, and a clock tower with a small belfry behind. Internally, the principal rooms were the Salle de Conseil (council chamber) and the Salle des Mariages (wedding room).

A statue created by the sculptor, Albert-Ernest Carrier-Belleuse, in 1870, depicting a slave with his chains broken, was installed in the foyer. The mayor, Antoine Siger, was shot and killed while standing on the balcony during an election campaign on 29 April 1908. An annex, with a theatre incorporating an Italian-style auditorium with 800 seats, was added to the building in 1912.

A new high-rise municipal office block was erected behind the building, facing on to Rue de la République, in 1970. The new structure stood on tall piers and was left open on the ground floor, while the windows on the upper floors were fronted with steel slats. The mayor and poet, Aimé Césaire, used the wedding room on the first floor of the old building as his office until he retired in 2001. Following his death in April 2008, the old building was renamed the Théâtre Aimé Césaire to commemorate his life.
