= Julienne Salvat =

French teacher, poet, and actress (1932–2019)

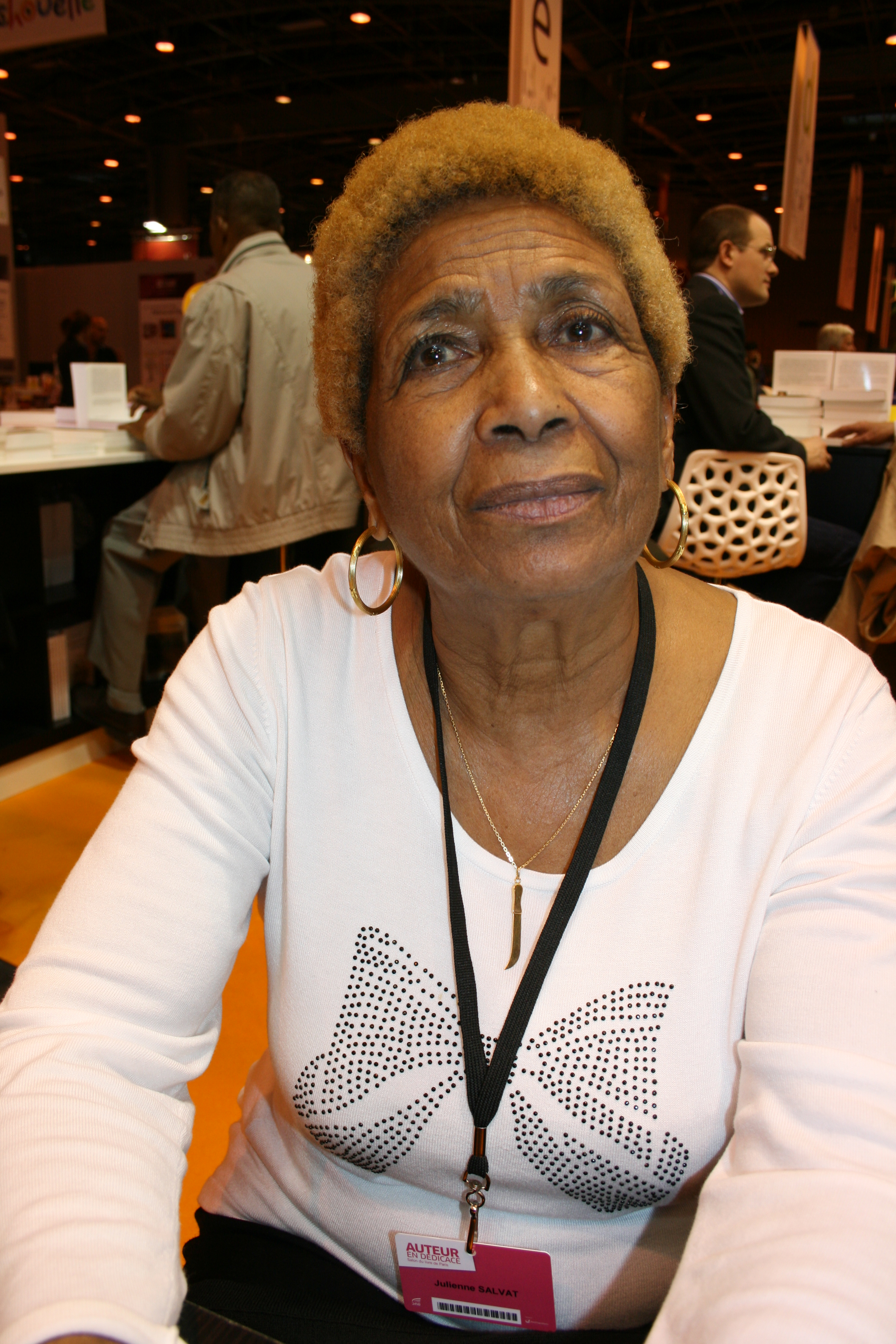
Julienne Salvat, 2011

Julienne Salvat (12 May 1932 – 11 March 2019) was a French teacher, poet, Femme de lettres, and actress from Martinique who spent a large part of her career in Réunion. She was the recipient of the Silver Medal from the Société Académique ASL in 2010.

== Biography ==
Julienne Salvat was born in Fort-de-France, Martinique on 12 May 1932.

She was a French teacher first in Martinique and in Bordeaux, before her relocation to Réunion, working in Saint-Denis, Réunion from 1965 until 1992. In addition to her teaching career, she devoted herself to theater and poetry. Salvat militated for Reunionese culture within the associations Union for the Defense of Reunion Identity (UDIR) and Association Reunion Communication and Culture (ARCC). She animated poetic and literary events, and regularly participated in various national and international fairs and festivals of poetry and theater. Salvat was an Indian Ocean delegate member of the Société des poètes français; as well as a member of Centre Réunionnais d'Action Culturelle (CRAC), L’ADELF (Association des Ecrivains de Langue Française), and Maison des Ecrivains et de la Littérature.

Salvat died in France on 11 March 2019, and was buried in Bègles.

== Awards ==
- 2010, Silver Medal, Société Académique ASL

== Selected works ==
- Tessons enflammés (poetry, [1993).
- Poèmes d’Elles (collection of women's poetry from the Indian Ocean region, edited and prefaced by Julienne Salvat, 1997).
- Chants de veille (poetry, 1998).
- Fractiles (poetry, 2001).
- La lettre d'Avignon (novel, 2002).
- Feuillesonge (poetry, 2006).
- Camille, récits d'hier et d'aujourd'hui (novel, 2007).
