= Fort Saint Louis (Martinique) =

Seaside Fortress in Fort-de-France, Martinique

Coordinates: 14.5999°N 61.0664°W

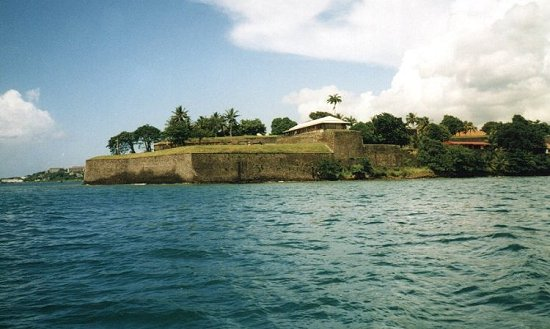
Fort Saint Louis, Martinique

Fort Saint Louis (often hyphenated as Fort Saint-Louis) is a seaside fortress in Fort-de-France, Martinique. The present-day fort has evolved from earlier strongholds that were erected on the site as early as 1638, and has been known in previous incarnations as Fort Royal and Fort de la Republique. The modern-day Fort Saint Louis is both an active naval base and a listed historic site of France. There are daily tours of the fort, though the portion that is still a naval base is off-limits.

== Naval base ==
Fort Saint Louis is under command of the capitaine de vaisseau in charge of the navy and the naval air forces for the Caribbean (COMAR ANTILLES). The forces based here include the surveillance frigates Ventôse (F733) and Germinal (F735), the patrol and support vessel Dumont d'Urville (A624) and the Confiance-class patrol vessel La Combattante (P735). One Engins de Débarquement Amphibie – Standards (EDA-S) landing craft is to be delivered to naval forces based in Martinique by 2025. The landing craft is to better support coastal operations in the region.

The active part of the fort includes the administrative buildings of the base, the service for naval constructions, the radio station of Pointe des Sables, ammunition storage facilities (at the end of Fort de France), and the Rivière Salée station (20 km away).

=== Environment ===
Fort Saint Louis has a commanding view of the anchorage of Fort-de-France, the island's capital city. It stands on a rocky peninsula at the edge of Fort-de-France Bay.

The fort has been home to many generations of a small but enduring colony of Green Iguana. The species, Iguana iguana, is not indigenous to Martinique and the reptiles are thought to have arrived by boat from either French Guiana or the Îles des Saintes and thrived in the fort area after their release or escape.

== History ==
In 1635, during the reign of Louis XIII, Pierre Belain d'Esnambuc and the Compagnie des Îles de l'Amérique established a French colony in Martinique, which the company governed until 1650. In 1638, Jacques Dyel du Parquet (1606-1658), nephew of Pierre Belain d'Esnambuc and first governor of Martinique, decided to have Fort Saint Louis built to protect the city against enemy attacks. The fort was soon destroyed, and rebuilt in 1669, when Louis XIV appointed Jean-Charles de Baas-Castelmore, the Marquis of Baas, as governor-general. Under his orders and those of his successors, particularly the Count of Blénac, the fort was built along the lines of a Vauban design.

On 19 July 1674, during the Third Anglo-Dutch War, Admiral de Ruyter led a Dutch fleet of eighteen warships, nine storeships, and fifteen troop transports bearing 3,400 soldiers in an attack on the fort. The attack lasted three days before the Dutch gave up. After the initial Dutch attack, Governor Sainte Marthe called a war council. Sieur de Gemozat, the Lieutenant du Roi (an engineering officer), was the only member to absolutely reject the option to surrender. Still, Captain Aycard, at ruinous personal cost, scuttled his fully freighted ship to prevent the Dutch vessels from entering the Carénage; the King rewarded the captain by authorizing him thereafter to fly an admiral's pennant wherever he went. During the siege, Thomas-Claude Renart de Fuschamberg, future Marquis d'Amblimont, and commander of the warship Les Jeux, used his vessel's guns to prevent the Dutch frigates from approaching the fort more closely, and the Dutch land forces from over-running the North Bastion. Today, the actions of Aycard, de Baas, de Gemozat and D'Amblimont are memorialized in structures in the fort that bear their names.

In 1677, Charles de La Roche-Courbon, comte de Blénac, became Governor-General, holding the post until 1683. He was responsible for the 10-year effort that resulted in the building of a 487-meter wall around the peninsula, the wall being four meters high and two meters thick. Comte de Blénac served as Governor-General again from June 1684 to February 1691, and again from 24 Nov 1691 until his death in 1696. His successor was the Marquis d'Amblimont, who had played an important role in the repulse of the Dutch.

In January 1759, the fort repulsed a British attack led by George Rodney. A second British attack three years later was successful. The British forces occupied two hills overlooking Fort Saint Louis, Morne Garnier and Morne Tartenson. Fort Saint Louis, although strong on the seaward side, was ill-prepared to resist bombardment from above and an attack from the landward. The British were therefore able to force its surrender. During this and subsequent periods of British occupation, the fort bore the name Fort Edward. On 11 February 1763, after the Treaty of Paris returned Martinique to French control, the British left and the fort resumed its name of Fort Royal. The French proceeded to construct a second fort, Fort Bourbon, on Morne Garnier to protect Fort Saint Louis. In 1793, with the advent of the French Revolution, the fort's name was changed to Fort de la Republique.

British forces capturing the fort on 20 March 1794 during the Battle of Martinique

In February 1794, British expeditionary force under Admiral John Jervis invaded Martinique, capturing the colony after a 28-day campaign. By 20 March only Fort Bourbon and Fort Royal still held out. Jervis ordered the fourth-rate ship of the line HMS Asia (64 guns), and the sloop, HMS Zebra to take Fort Saint Louis. Asia was unable to get close, and so Commander Faulknor of Zebra volunteered to undertake the capture without the help of the larger vessel. Despite facing heavy fire, he ran his sloop close under the walls. He and his ship's company used Zebra's boats to land. The British stormed the fort and captured it. Meanwhile, the boats of the British fleet captured Fort Royal and two days later Fort Bourbon capitulated.

The governor of Martinique at the time was Donatien de Rochambeau. The British occupied the fort from 22 May 1794 until September 1802 when the Treaty of Amiens again returned Martinique to France. The fort was renamed Fort Saint Louis. The British captured Martinique again in 1809. During their attack, Commander Charles John Napier of the brig-sloop Recruit noticed that Fort Edward, as he termed it, appeared abandoned. He took a gig and with four men, landed, scaled the fort's walls, and hoisted a British flag. Sir Alexander Cochrane immediately landed marines to occupy the fort and turn its mortars, which its fleeing garrison had not spiked, against the French.

Vice-admiral Louis Thomas Villaret de Joyeuse, who had become governor in September 1802, was still in office at the time of the British attack. A Court of Inquiry in Paris in December 1809 stripped Villaret and some of his subordinates of their rank and honors, holding them responsible for problems with the fortification of Fort Desaix and the subsequent loss of the island. The British occupied the fort from 21 February 1809 to 8 October 1814, and again briefly in 1815 after Napoleon escaped from Elba. Several British regiments, such as the Royal Welsh Fusiliers, the 63rd (The West Suffolk) Regiment of Foot, and others, have 'Martinique 1809' as one of their battle honors. Between 1850 and 1896, the French installed a number of artillery pieces at the fort and at Pointe des Negres to protect the bay.
