= Fort-de-France Bay =

Bay of Martinique

Coordinates: 14°34′N 61°3′W

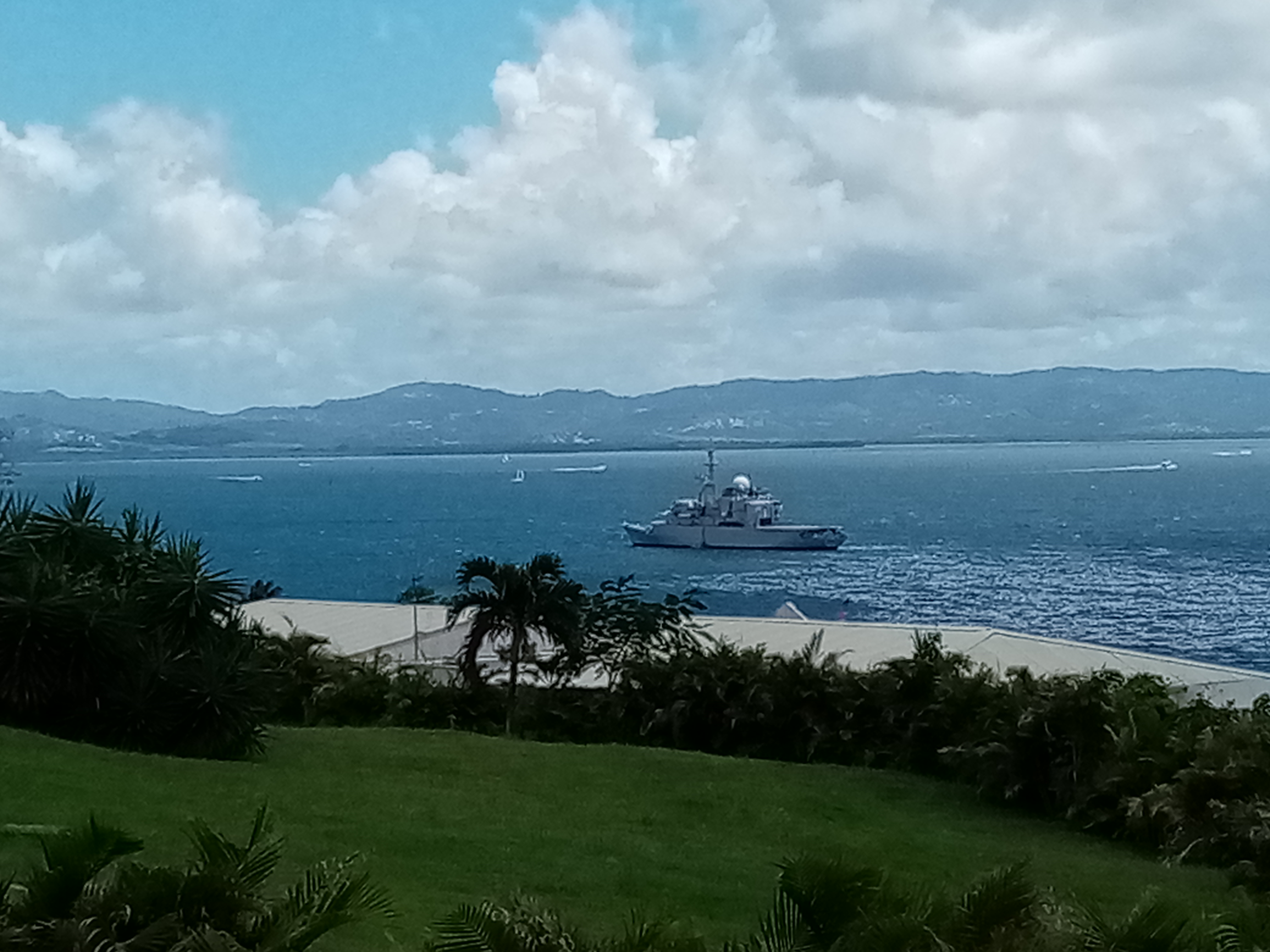

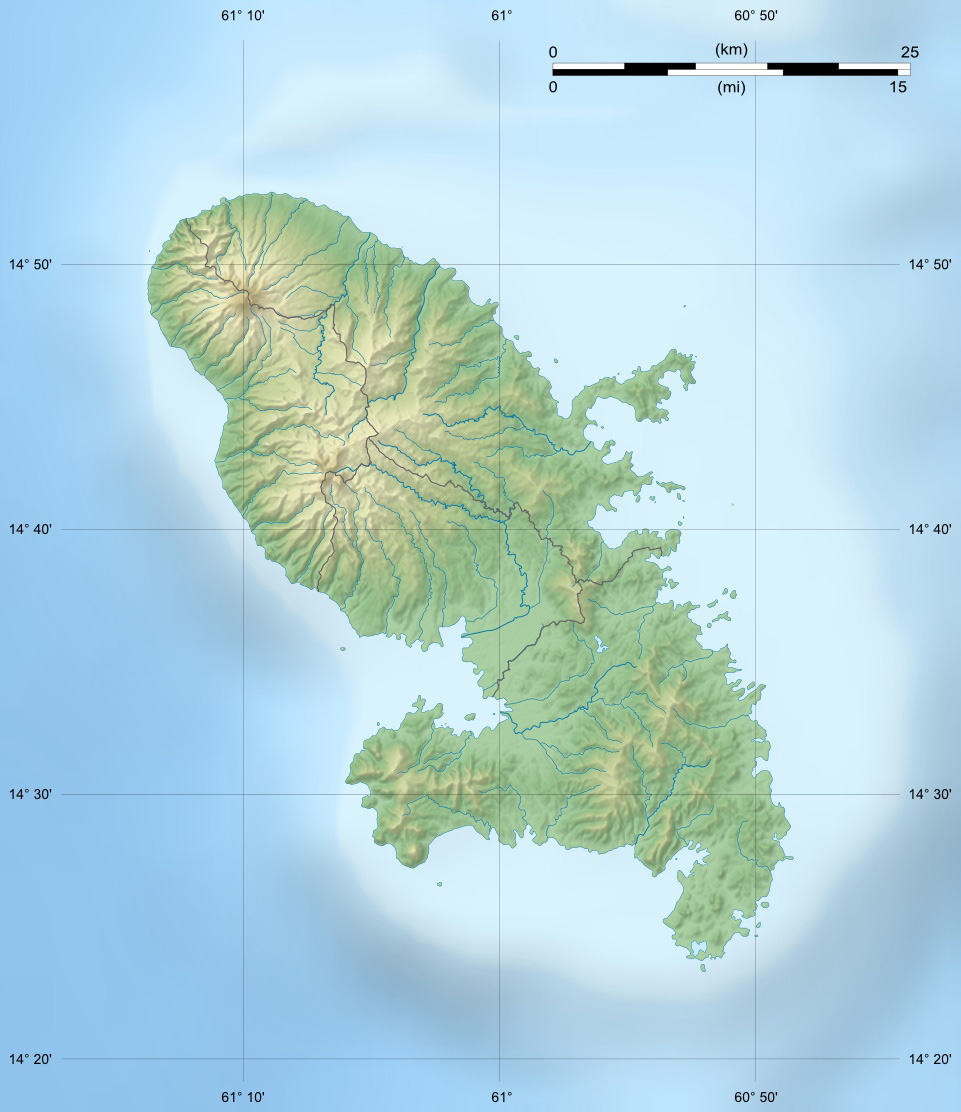
- Location within Martinique
- Location: Martinique
- Type: Bay
- Settlements: Fort-de-France, Les Trois-Îlets

Fort-de-France Bay (French: Baie de Fort-de-France, pronounced [bɛ də fɔʁ də fʁɑ̃s]) is a large inlet of the Caribbean Sea, off the coast of Martinique. It is named after Martinique's capital, Fort-de-France, located north of the bay.

== Important Bird Area ==
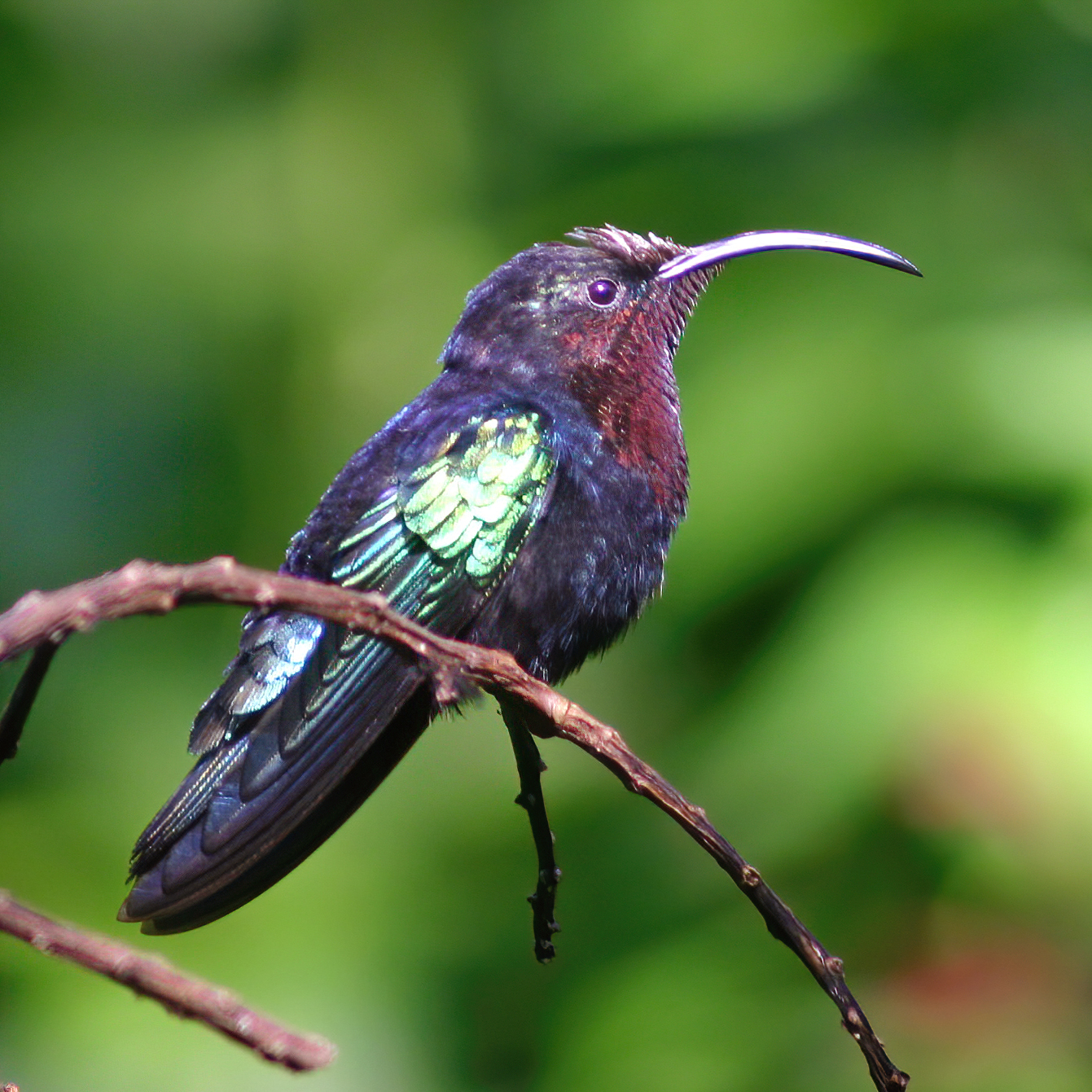
Purple-throated caribs are resident in the IBA

A tract of some 3,361 ha, encompassing the largest area of mangroves in Martinique, on the eastern side of the bay, has been recognised as an Important Bird Area (IBA) by BirdLife International because it supports populations of green-throated and purple-throated caribs, Antillean crested hummingbirds, Caribbean elaenias, Lesser Antillean flycatchers, Lesser Antillean pewees, scaly-breasted thrashers, Martinique orioles, Lesser Antillean saltators and Lesser Antillean bullfinches.
