= Fort-de-France =

Commune and capital city of Martinique

- Prefecture and commune
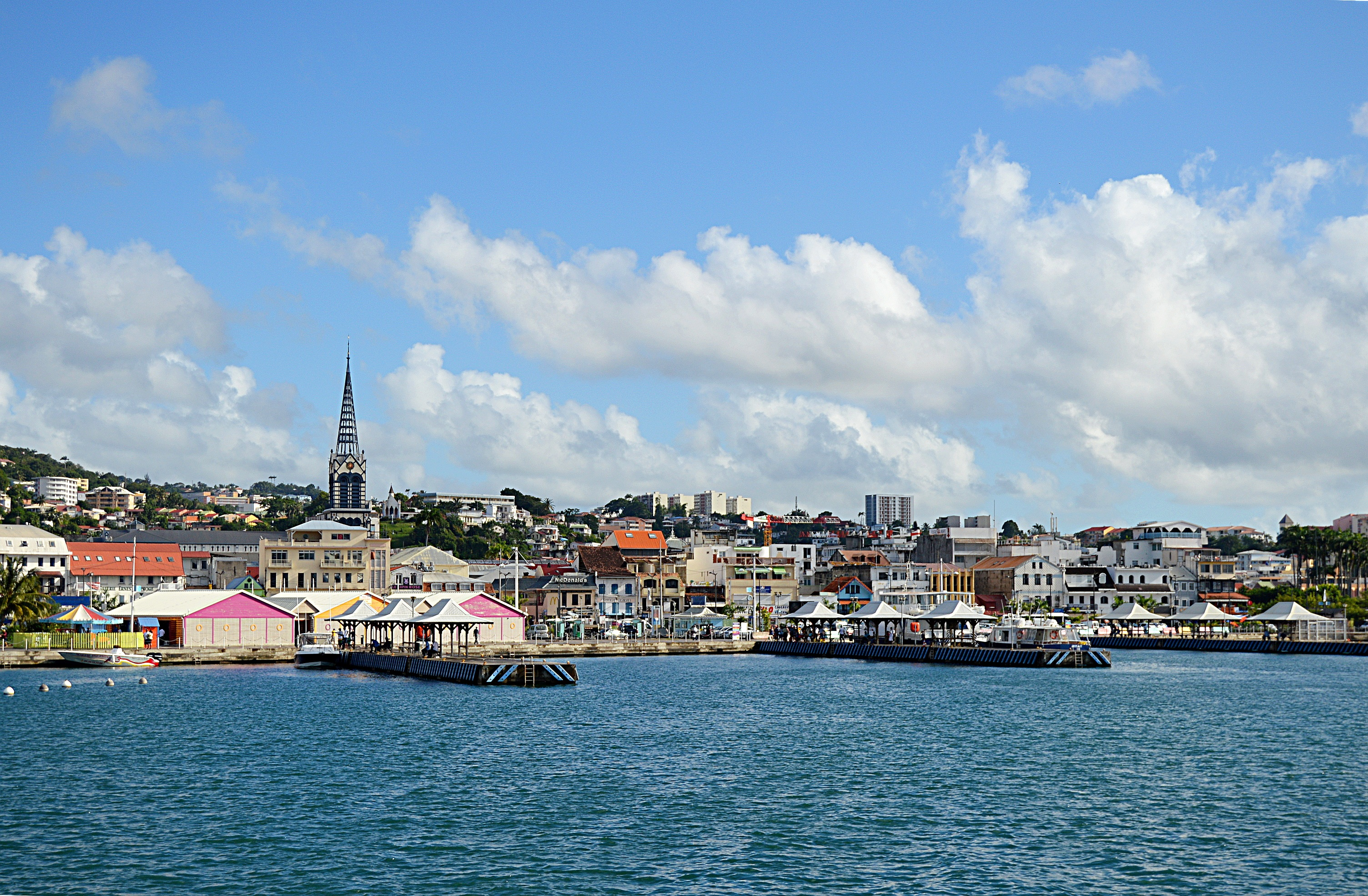
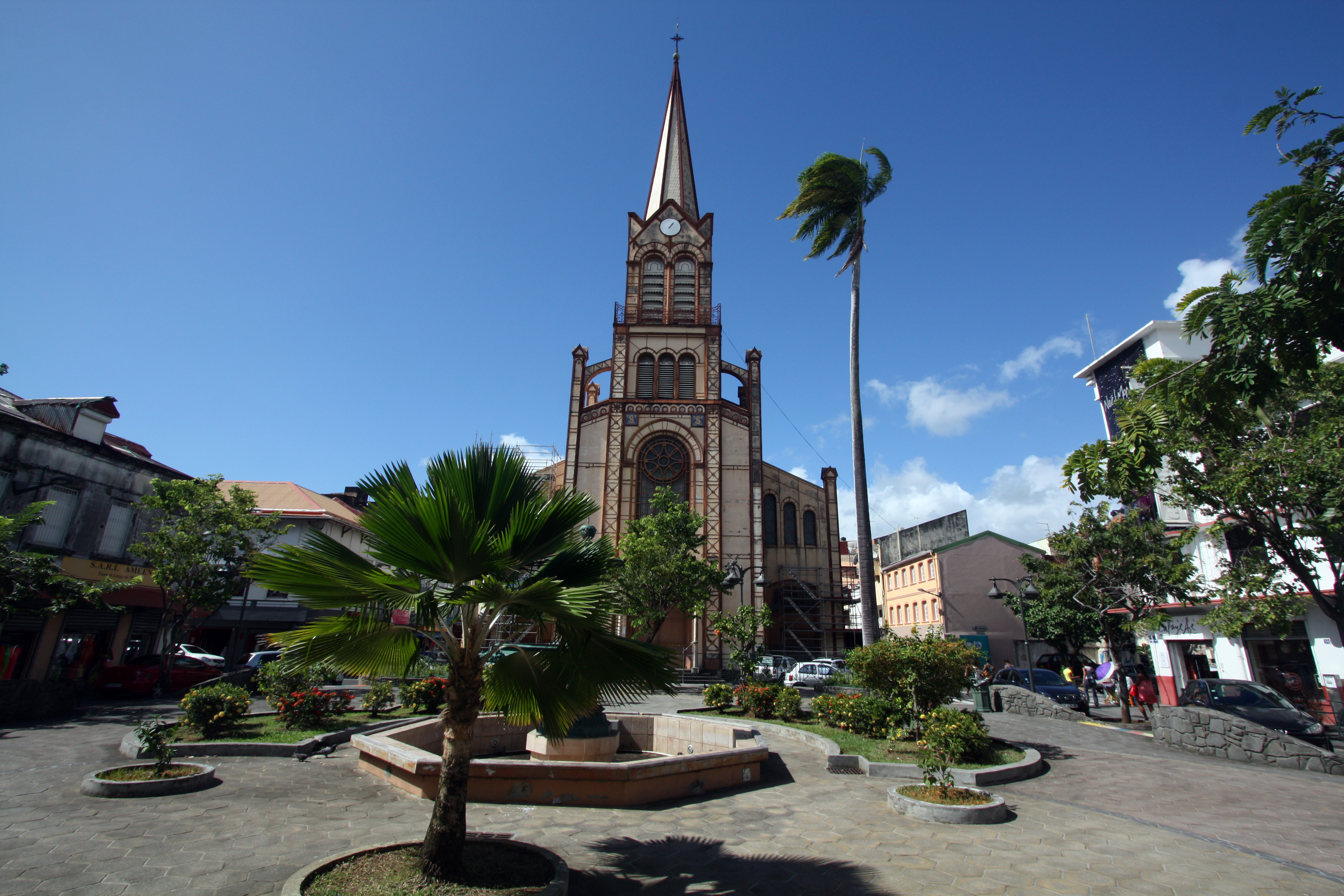
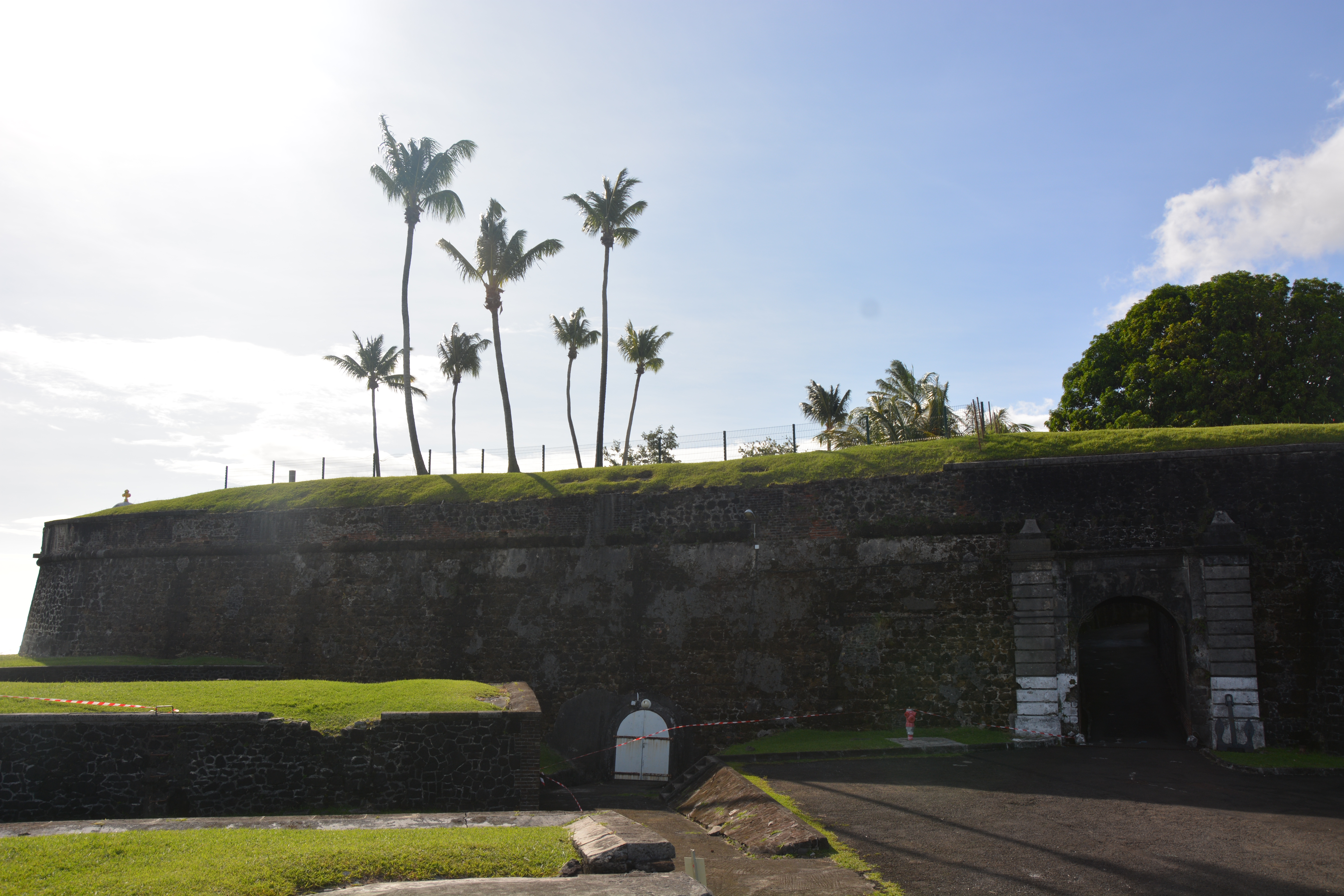
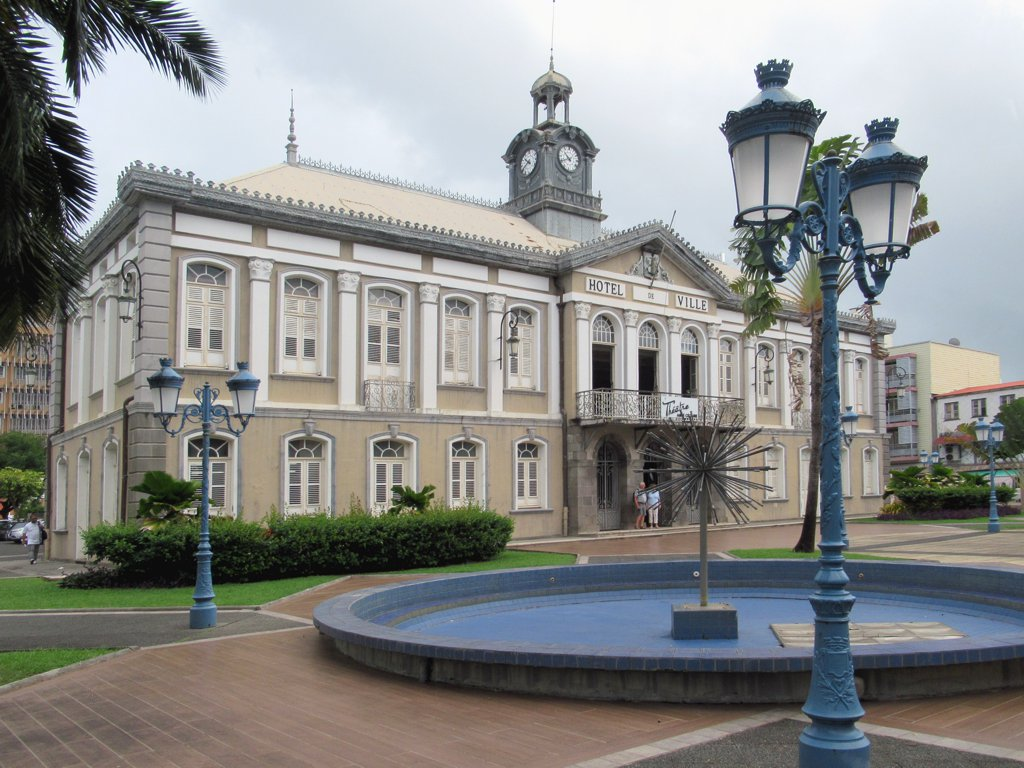
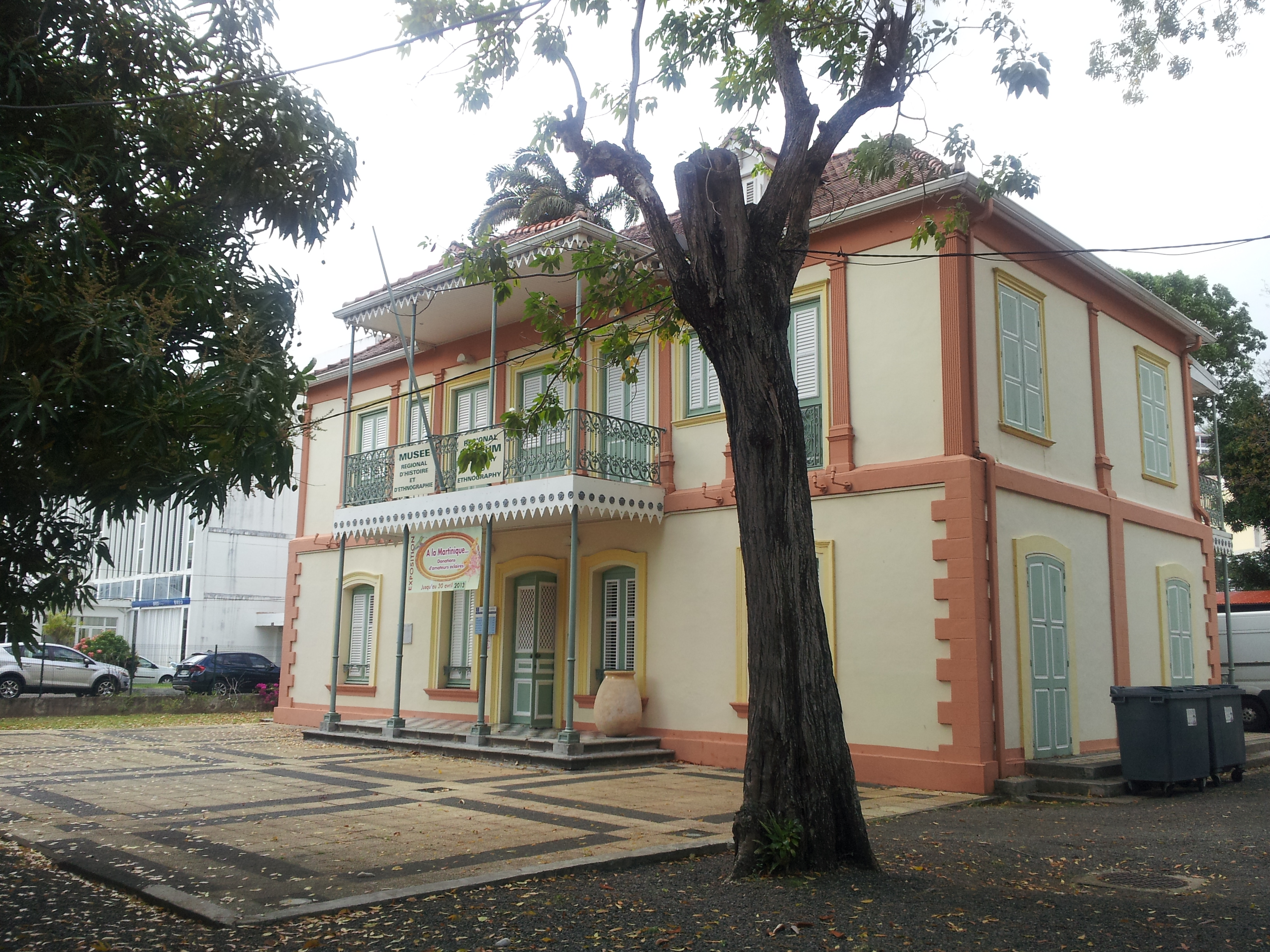
- Top: Fort-de-France skyline; Middle: Fort-de-France Cathedral, Fort Saint Louis; Bottom: Hôtel de Ville (town hall), Regional Museum of History and Ethnography of Martinique

- Coat of arms

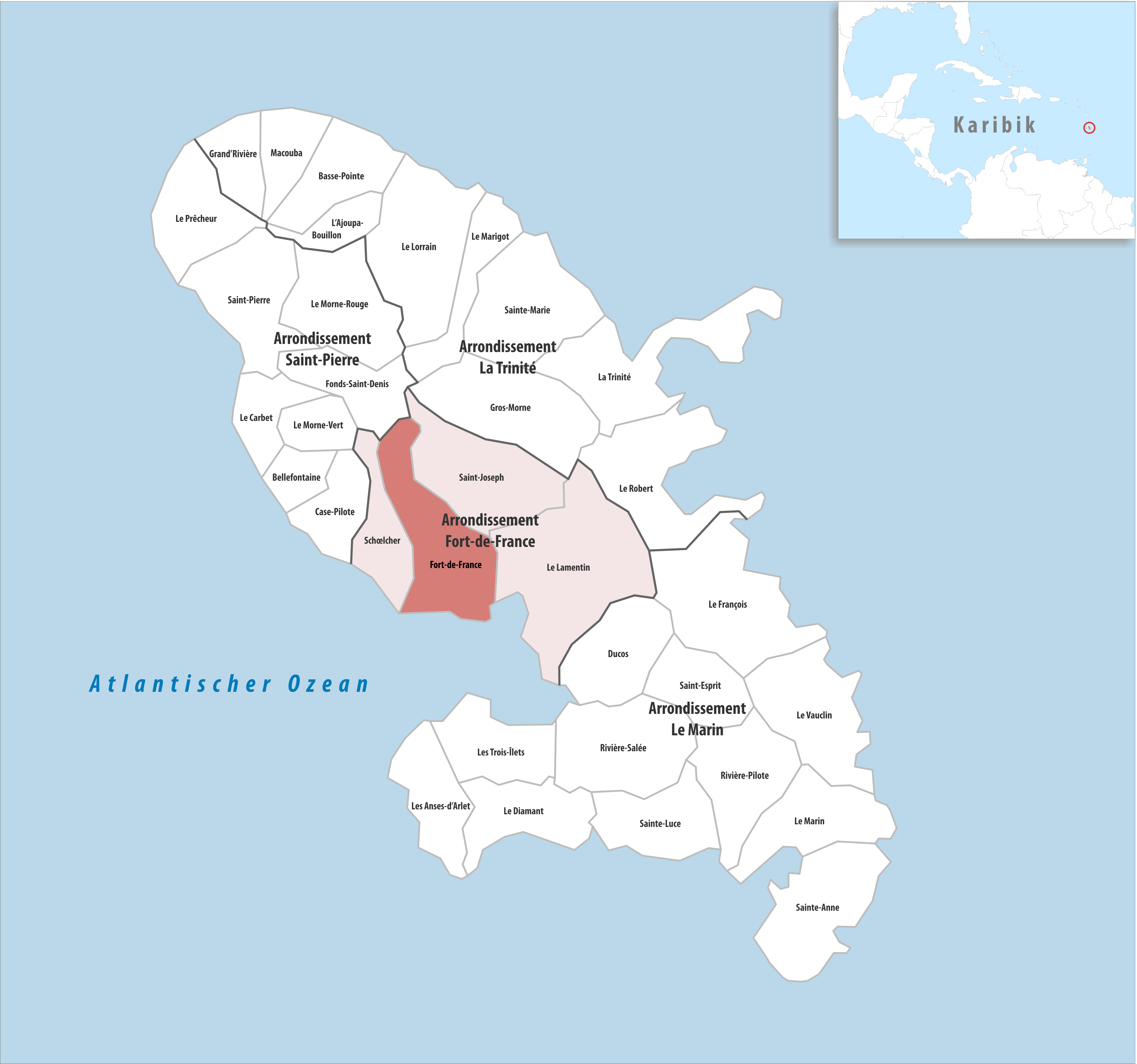
- Location of the commune (in red) within Martinique
- Location of Fort-de-France
- Coordinates: 14°36′00″N 61°04′00″W
- Country: France
- Overseas region and department: Martinique
- Arrondissement: Fort-de-France
- Intercommunality: CA Centre de la Martinique

Government
  - Mayor (2020–2026): Didier Laguerre (PPM)
- Area^{1}: 44.21 km^{2} (17.07 sq mi)
- Highest elevation: 1,070 m (3,510 ft)
- Lowest elevation: 0 m (0 ft)
- Population (2023): 75,506
  - Density: 1,708/km^{2} (4,423/sq mi)
- Time zone: UTC−04:00 (AST)
- INSEE/Postal code: 97209 /97200 and 97234 (Quartier de Balata)
- ^{1} French Land Register data, which excludes lakes, ponds, glaciers > 1 km^{2} (0.386 sq mi or 247 acres) and river estuaries.

Fort-de-France (/ˌfɔːr də ˈfrɒ̃s/, US also /ˌfɔːrt də ˈfræns/, French: [fɔʁ də fʁɑ̃s]; Martinican Creole: Fodfwans) is a commune and the capital city of Martinique, an overseas department and region of France located in the Caribbean.

== History ==
Before it was ceded to France by Spain in 1635, the area of Fort-de-France was known as Iguanacaera, which translates to "Iguana Island" in the indigenous Kariʼnja language. In 1638, Jacques Dyel du Parquet (1606–1658), nephew of Pierre Belain d'Esnambuc and first governor of Martinique, decided to have Fort Saint Louis built to protect the city against enemy attacks. The fort was soon destroyed, and rebuilt in 1669, when King Louis XIV appointed the Marquis of Baas as governor general. Under his orders and those of his successors, particularly the Count of Blénac, the fort was built with a Vauban design. In the 1680s, the area was settled and became the French colonial capital in the Caribbean and the New World, eventually developing into the city of Fort-de-France and it was governed by the Code Noir ("Black Code"), which was a French decree that regulated slavery in the French colonies including Martinique. King Louis XIV issued the Code Noir in 1685, which detailed the conditions of slavery and also restricted the freedoms of free black people.

Originally named Fort-Royal, the administrative capital of Martinique was over-shadowed by Saint-Pierre, the oldest city in the island, which was renowned for its commercial and cultural vibrancy as "The Paris of the Caribbean".

The name of Fort-Royal was changed to a short-lived "Fort-La-Republique" during the French Revolution, and finally settled as Fort-de-France sometime in the 19th century. The old name of Fort-Royal is still used today familiarly in its Creole language form of "Foyal", with the inhabitants of the city being "Foyalais".

The city was captured by a British expedition which captured Martinique in 1762, but the island was returned to French control in the Treaty of Paris. In 1839, the city was struck by a minor earthquake and 1890 saw an outbreak of fire which razed part of the city. The Hôtel de Ville (town hall) was completed in 1901.

By the turn of the 20th century, however, Fort-de-France became economically important after the volcanic eruption of Mount Pelée destroyed the town of Saint-Pierre in 1902.

Until 1918, when its commercial growth began, Fort-de-France had an inadequate water supply, was partly surrounded by swamps, and was notorious for yellow fever. Now the swamps are drained to make room for extensive suburbs.

On 3 August 1945, Fort-de-France's hydrobase became the site of Martinique's first fatal airliner crash. A Sikorsky S-43 (NC15066) on Pan Am Flight 216 arriving from Port of Spain at 10:11 was landed in poor weather conditions due to safety concerns by the crew and subsequently sank within 10 minutes, killing 4 of the 14 occupants.

== Geography ==
Fort-de-France, also known as the Fort of France, lies on Martinique's west coast at the northern entrance to the large Fort-de-France Bay, at the mouth of the Madame River. The city occupies a narrow plain between the hills and the sea but is accessible by road from all parts of the island.

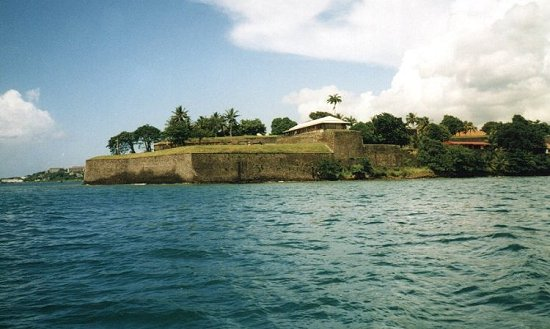
Fort Saint Louis seen from the sea.

The frigate Ventôse seen behind the old fort.

== Climate ==
Fort-de-France has a tropical rainforest climate (Köppen Af), characterised by very warm to hot and humid weather year-round. The wettest months are from July to November when hurricanes are a frequent threat, although substantial rainfall occurs in all months. The hottest month on average is September, and the coldest month on average is February.

Climate data for Fort-de-France (1991–2020 averages, extremes 1932–present)
Month	Jan	Feb	Mar	Apr	May	Jun	Jul	Aug	Sep	Oct	Nov	Dec	Year
Record high °C (°F)	31.5 (88.7)	32.1 (89.8)	33.6 (92.5)	33.0 (91.4)	33.9 (93.0)	33.6 (92.5)	33.6 (92.5)	33.0 (91.4)	33.8 (92.8)	33.0 (91.4)	32.1 (89.8)	31.3 (88.3)	33.9 (93.0)
Mean daily maximum °C (°F)	27.7 (81.9)	27.9 (82.2)	28.5 (83.3)	29.3 (84.7)	29.8 (85.6)	29.6 (85.3)	29.7 (85.5)	30.2 (86.4)	30.5 (86.9)	30.2 (86.4)	29.2 (84.6)	28.2 (82.8)	29.2 (84.6)
Daily mean °C (°F)	25.0 (77.0)	24.9 (76.8)	25.4 (77.7)	26.2 (79.2)	26.8 (80.2)	27.0 (80.6)	26.9 (80.4)	27.3 (81.1)	27.5 (81.5)	27.2 (81.0)	26.4 (79.5)	25.6 (78.1)	26.4 (79.5)
Mean daily minimum °C (°F)	22.2 (72.0)	22.0 (71.6)	22.3 (72.1)	23.1 (73.6)	23.6 (74.5)	24.3 (75.7)	24.2 (75.6)	24.4 (75.9)	24.5 (76.1)	24.2 (75.6)	23.7 (74.7)	23.0 (73.4)	23.5 (74.3)
Record low °C (°F)	17.8 (64.0)	17.3 (63.1)	18.6 (65.5)	18.9 (66.0)	19.9 (67.8)	20.0 (68.0)	18.4 (65.1)	19.5 (67.1)	17.9 (64.2)	20.2 (68.4)	19.7 (67.5)	17.4 (63.3)	17.3 (63.1)
Average precipitation mm (inches)	113.9 (4.48)	76.5 (3.01)	70.5 (2.78)	108.8 (4.28)	133.0 (5.24)	154.1 (6.07)	205.6 (8.09)	246.7 (9.71)	213.9 (8.42)	243.0 (9.57)	236.7 (9.32)	147.8 (5.82)	1,950.5 (76.79)
Average precipitation days (≥ 1.0 mm)	18.6	14.1	12.2	12.6	13.2	17.0	20.6	19.2	17.2	18.0	19.2	18.1	200.0
Mean monthly sunshine hours	204.2	197.6	222.1	209.5	207.5	190.3	201.5	224.6	205.3	187.4	183.2	204.0	2,437
Source 1: Météo France
Source 2: Meteociel.fr (sunshine 1981-2010)

== Population ==
Historical population
Year	Pop.	±% p.a.
1961	84,811	—
1967	96,943	+2.25%
1974	98,807	+0.27%
1982	99,844	+0.13%
1990	100,080	+0.03%
1999	94,049	−0.69%
2007	89,794	−0.58%
2012	85,667	−0.94%
2017	80,041	−1.35%
Source: SPLAF and INSEE (1967-2017)

== Naval port ==
Fort Saint Louis in Fort-de-France is a French naval base.

== Government ==
As of 27 June 2021, the Mayor of Fort de France is Serge Letchimy replacing Alfred Marie-Jeanne as the new mayor of the capitol. With a participation rate of little over 44% the Letchimy Party Alians Matinik received 37,72% of the votes, whereas Marie Jeanna who came in a close second with Gran Sanblé Pou Matinik acquired 35,27% of the votes. The commune of Fort-de-France makes up Martinique's 3rd constituency for the National Assembly.

== Main sights ==
- Fort Desaix
- La Savane, a park
- Jardin de Balata, a botanical garden
- Fort-de-France Cathedral
- A statue of Empress Joséphine, the wife of Napoleon in the gardens of La Savane was destroyed by anti-racist protestors in 2020.

== Transport ==
Martinique Aimé Césaire International Airport is located in a suburb outside Fort-de-France.

== Notable people ==
- Louis François Auguste Souleyet (1811–1852), zoologist, malacologist, died in Fort-de-France
- Suzanne Lacascade (1884–1966), writer
- Manon Tardon (1913–1989), Resistance fighter
- Frantz Fanon (1925–1961), psychiatrist, political philosopher revolutionary
- Julienne Salvat (1932–2019), teacher, poet, actress
- Karine Jean-Pierre (born 1974), White House Press Secretary
- Jean-Michel Lucenay (born 1978), fencer

== See also ==
- Communes of the Martinique department
