= Martinican literature =

Literature from Martinique

Martinican literature is primarily written in French or Creole and draws upon influences from African, French and Indigenous traditions, as well as from various other cultures represented in Martinique. The development of literature in Martinique is linked to that of other parts of the French Caribbean but has its own distinct historical context and characteristics.

The writing of Martinique is strongly linked to political and philosophical theory. Writers and theories originating from Martinique, such as Aimé Césaire, Paulette Nardal, Frantz Fanon and Édouard Glissant have been influential on wider Francophone literature and thought. This impact has also extended beyond the French-speaking world, including Anglophone literature and literary theory.

Martinican literature often explores themes of identity, postcolonialism, slavery and nationalism. It is marked by the historical and political context of Martinique as a former French colony and current overseas department and region.

== History ==
=== Pre-colonial era ===
Reproduction of petroglyphs on a rock in Montravail, Martinique

Before the arrival of Columbus in the Caribbean in 1494, the main ethnic groups of Martinique were the Arawak and the Kalinago. Patrick Chamoiseau and Raphaël Confiant find traces of an indigenous storytelling tradition in petroglyphs carved into rocks. While there is no literary tradition from this period in the conventional sense, influences from Indigenous modes of storytelling remain in the literature of Martinique.

=== Colonial era ===
Early writing in French originating from Martinique was written by colonial settlers from Europe, primarily in the form of descriptions of the region. This was primarily done by missionaries and priests such as Jean-Baptiste Du Tertre, who published Histoire générale des Antilles habitées par les Français from 1667 to 1671.

It was not until the late eighteenth century that writing produced by writers born in Martinique and elsewhere in the Antilles began to appear. These texts were written by those in the white béké class of descendants of European settlers. While writing by black and mixed-race authors began to emerge in Haiti and a Haitian literature began to develop in the nineteenth century after independence in 1804, the written output of Martinique, still a French colony, continued to originate primarily from béké writers.

=== 20th Century ===
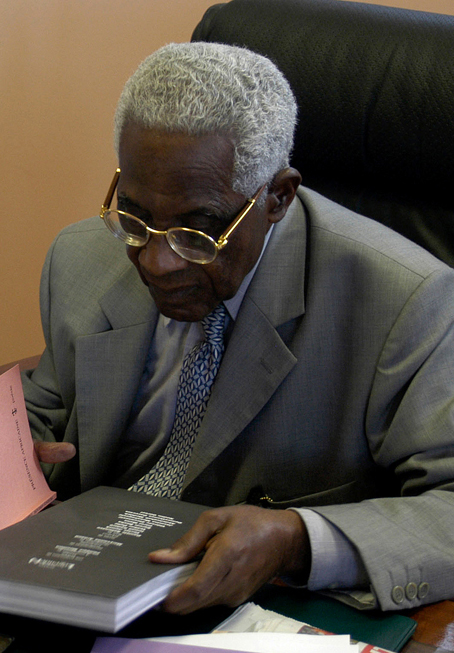
Aimé Césaire, one of the founders of the Négritude movement

There were three main schools of thought in Martinican literature and theory during the twentieth century: Négritude, Antillanité and Créolité.

In the early twentieth century, non-white poets began to publish poetry. Eugène Agricole was the first black Antillean poet to publish a volume of poetry, Fleurs des Antilles in 1900. Early black Martinican literature was written in a derivative style that attempted to assimilate with writing from Metropolitan France. A black Martinican literary tradition began to develop in the 1920s and 1930s. Aimé Césaire and Négritude were instrumental in the development of this tradition.

Négritude was founded in the 1930s by a group of students in Paris and the movement underwent many transformations and was practiced differently by its various proponents.

In 1939, Césaire published the highly influential book-length poem, Cahier d'un retour au pays natal, which reflects on cultural identity and is regarded as one of the most important Négritude texts.

In 1946, Martinique became an overseas department of France. Césaire, who was not only a poet but also a politician, was involved in passing the law implementing departmentalization. The status of the island as part of the French republic has influenced much of its literature, which often deals with questions of cultural identity and nationalism.

Poetry was the main genre associated with Négritude and made up most of the Antillean literary production in the 1940s and 1950s, but Martinican writers began writing novels in this period as well, such as Mayotte Capécia's I Am a Martinican Woman (1948), Raphaël Tardon's Starkenfirst (1947) and Joseph Zobel's La Rue Cases-Nègres (1950).

The novel became the dominant form of literature in Martinique from 1960 onwards. In the 1960s, an interest in literature in Creole began to emerge. This was to some extent related to the support for pro-independence movements, which often advocated for Creole as a national language. However, French remains the primary language for the production of literature in Martinique, though many writers incorporate Creole into their writing.

At the forefront of the study and promotion of Antillean culture and identity was Édouard Glissant, whose body of work includes poetry, essays, theater and novels. He was critical of Césaire and Négritude and emphasized the historical and sociocultural context of the Caribbean and the hybridity of Antillean identity. His contributions to literary theory, especially the poetics of relation, have had an important influence on postcolonial literature and criticism.

In the 1970s, a greater number of women writers began to publish writing which explored themes of gender and Antillean identity.

In the 1980s, influenced by Édouard Glissant, Martinican writers became interested in tracing the Creolization, or the process of the formation of Antillean language and identity through the mixing of cultural influences. In 1989, Jean Bernabé, Patrick Chamoiseau and Raphaël Confiant published In Praise of Creoleness (French: Éloge de la créolité), an essay which serves as the manifesto for the Créolité movement. These ideas are reflected in the works of these three authors as well as others. Chamoiseau's 1992 novel Texaco explores the process of creolization and has had an important impact on Francophone literature.

== Négritude ==
Martinican writing in the mid-twentieth century was marked by the Négritude movement established by Francophone intellectuals during the 1930s by Martinican poet Aimé Césaire with Léon Damas, Léopold Sédar Senghor. Other important figures included Paulette Nardal and her sister Jane Nardal, also from Martinique. Négritude is both a cultural and political movement that emphasizes collective experience, history and African identity among black diaspora. There is an emphasis on the shared experience of slavery. Césaire's legacy remains an inspiration and important influence on postcolonial literature and thought and Négritude has inspired other movements.

== Créolité ==
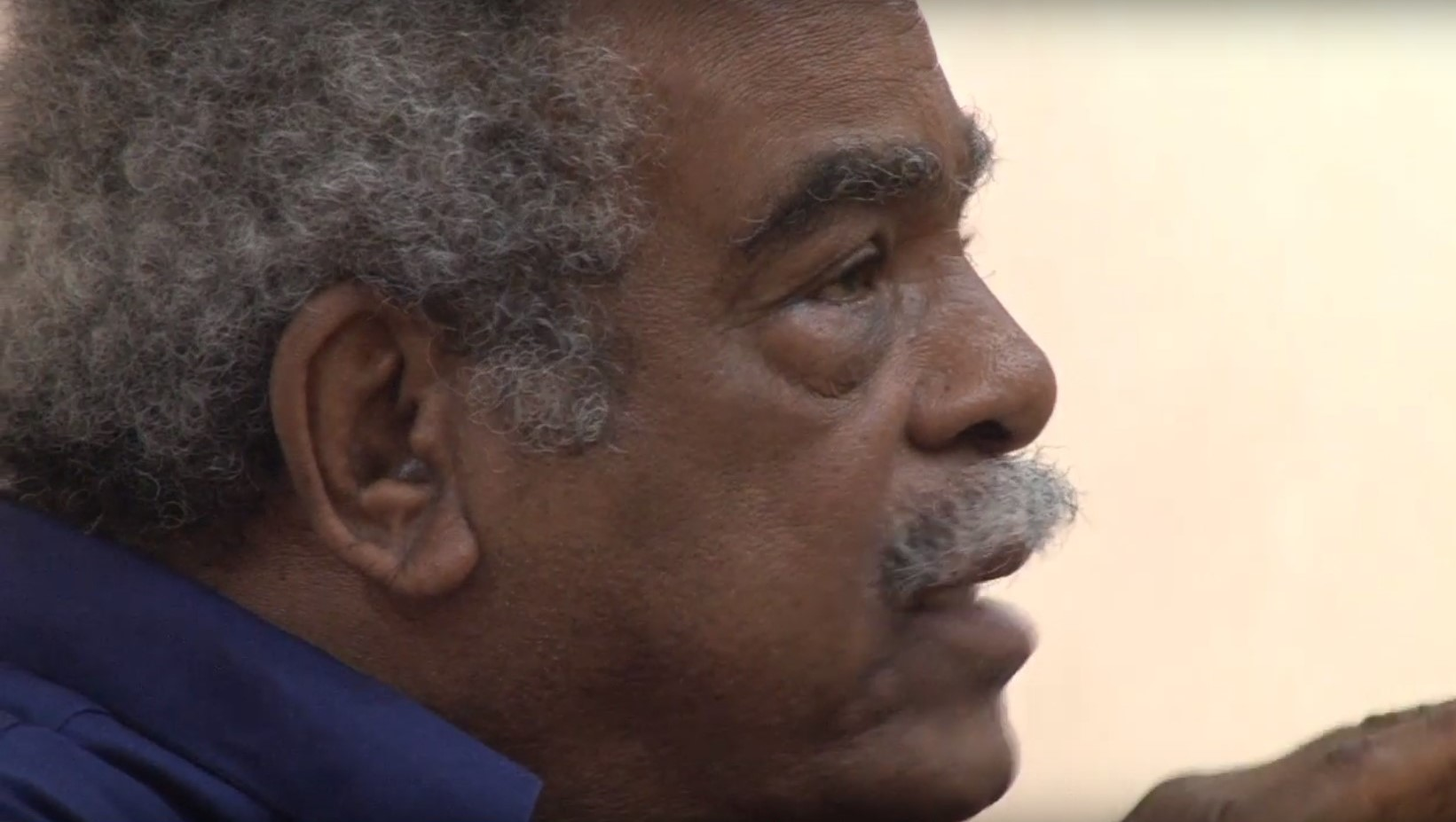
Édouard Glissant

Créolité emerged in response to Négritude's singular focus on Africa and emphasizes the heterogeneity of Antillean culture and identity. The movement was founded by Jean Bernabé, Patrick Chamoiseau and Raphäel Confiant in the 1980s and is inspired by Édouard Glissant's concepts of Antillanité and Creolization. The ideas and aesthetics of Créolité can be found in much contemporary Martinican writing, including an emphasis on oral tradition and creole language and identity.

== Martinican women's writing ==
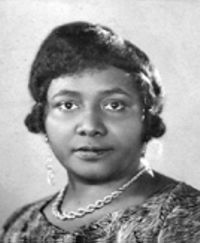
Paulette Nardal, an important contributor to the Négritude movement

Much scholarship related to the literature of Martinique focuses on men's contributions and both the Négritude and Créolité movements have been criticised for being patriarchal. Women's writing emerged later in the development of Martinican literature but Martinican women have had important contributions both to Francophone women's writing and Caribbean literature and thought as a whole.

Sisters Jan and Paulette Nardal played a significant role in the creation of Négritude. Paulette Nardal translated works from the Harlem Renaissance into French, introducing the founders of Négritude to the work of African-American intellectuals, which influenced the development of the movement.

Mayotte Capécia's I Am a Martinican Woman was published in 1948, making it the first book by a woman of color to be published in France.

== Notable writers ==
- Mayotte Capécia
- Marie-Magdeleine Carbet
- Aimé Césaire
- Patrick Chamoiseau
- Raphaël Confiant
- Frantz Fanon
- Edouard Glissant
- Paulette Nardal
- Joseph Zobel

== See also ==
- Black Skin, White Masks
- Cahier d'un retour au pays natal
- Discourse on Colonialism
- Texaco
- Caribbean literature
- Francophone literature
