= Antilla (magazine) =

- Founder(s): Henri Pied
- Editor-in-chief: Tony Delsham (until 2024)
- Staff writers: Raphaël Confiant; Patrick Chamoiseau
- Founded: 1981`
- Political alignment: Left-wing; Environmentalism
- Language: French
- Website: antilla-martinique.com

Antilla is a weekly French-language political and economic magazine from Martinique. The founder of the magazine, Henri Pied, has headed it since its creation in 1981. From 1990 until his death in 2024, Tony Delsham was its editor-in-chief. Written in French, the articles often have Creole headlines. However, the publication occasionally prints solely Creole articles.

The magazine's chief competitor is France-Antilles.
