= Ada Quayle =

Jamaican novelist

Ada Quayle was the pseudonym of Kathleen Louise Woods, née Robinson (1920 – December 2002), a Jamaican novelist and author of a historical novel, The Mistress (1957).

== Life ==
Kathleen Robinson was born to a mixed-race marriage in Jamaica in 1920. She married an English husband, whom she had apparently met on a boat to Kenya in Egypt. She moved to England during the Second World War, working there as a wireless operator. After the war she settled in Manchester, where she wrote The Mistress.

The "rather predictable" plot of The Mistress, set in Jamaica in 1915, is one of "plantation decadence and deterioration," dominated by "lust, avarice and cruelty." The novel "explores the psychological (and psycho-sexual) legacy of a slave economy" after emancipation. In one scene, a white landowner, Neil, finds he has blood on himself after whipping a black labourer, Sammy Johnson. The landowner's distress at what he feels as racial contamination has ambivalent erotic undertones. The novel contains passing references to Jamaican folk traditions such as the Junkanoo dance, and an Obeahman, Chi-Ju-Ju. Both white and black characters speak in Jamaican creole.

In a 1958 article on emerging Caribbean writers, Sylvia Wynter called The Mistress "a competent historical piece," though gave it no extended treatment. Frank Collymore, reviewing the novel for BIM, characterised its style as "that clipped staccato style which one might be tempted to call the earnest heming way." However, "much can be forgiven," Collymore continued, "so well is the story developed, so intense its presentation, so powerful its characterization."

Wynter also identified Quayle as the first woman novelist from the Caribbean. This claim doesn't account for several who preceded her. Mayotte Capécia's Je suis martiniquaise had been published in 1948. (The novel is most known for Frantz Fanon's virulent critique of its characters in Black Skin, White Masks.) Defender of British colonialism and producer of the West Indian Review, Esther Hyman, had published four novels by 1953. Three women from Dominica also wrote novels before 1958. Phyllis Shand Allfrey had published The Orchid House in 1953, Elma Napier had published two novels even earlier, in the 1930s, and Jean Rhys had already published four, with her most famous fifth, Wide Sargasso Sea, still to come in 1966.

However, a novel by a woman from the Caribbean was still considered remarkable in the 1950s.

Woods died in Suffolk in December 2002.

== Works ==
- The Mistress. Letchworth, Hertfordshire: MacGibbon & Kee, 1957. Paperback reprint, London: Four Square Books, 1961.
