= Marie-Joseph Pernock =

Martiniquais politician

Deputy of the National Assembly
- In office 1966-06-20 – 1967-04-02

Personal details
- Born: 1897-06-04 Le Lorrain, Martinique
- Died: 1975-06-01 Le Lorrain, Martinique
- Party: Socialist Party

Joseph Pernock (4 June 1897 in Le Lorrain, Martinique – 1 June 1975) was a politician from Martinique who served in the French National Assembly from 1966-1967. A school was named in his honour in Le Lorraine, the Lycée Polyvalent Joseph Pernock, on the 6 December 1980.
