= Hortense Spillers =

American literary critic (born 1942)

Hortense J. Spillers
- Born: April 24, 1942 (age 84)
- Education: University of Memphis (B.A., 1964) University of Memphis (M.A., 1966) Brandeis University (Ph.D., 1974)
- Occupations: Professor, literary critic, Black feminist scholar
- Employer: Vanderbilt University
- Known for: Essays on African-American literature
- Notable work: "Mama's Baby, Papa's Maybe: An American Grammar Book" (1987); Comparative American Identities: Race, Sex, and Nationality in the Modern Text (1991)

Hortense J. Spillers (born April 24, 1942) is an American literary critic, Black feminist scholar, and professor emeritus at Vanderbilt University. Spillers is known for her work on African-American literature, collected in Black, White, and In Color: Essays on American Literature and Culture, published by the University of Chicago Press in 2003, and Comparative American Identities: Race, Sex, and Nationality in the Modern Text, published by Routledge in 1991.

== Life ==
Spillers grew up in Memphis, Tennessee. She received her B.A. degree from University of Memphis in 1964 and M.A. in 1966, and her Ph.D. in English at Brandeis University in 1974. While at the University of Memphis, she was a disc jockey for the all-Black radio station WDIA.

She has held positions at Haverford College, Wellesley College, Emory University, and Cornell University. She has received grants from the Rockefeller and Ford Foundations. In 2013, she was the founding editor of The A-Line: A Journal of Progressive Thought.

Spillers was elected to the American Academy of Arts and Sciences in 2021. She received an honorary doctorate from Yale University in 2024. She is in the process of two new writing projects.

== Work ==
=== "Mama's Baby, Papa's Maybe" ===
Spillers is best known for her 1987 scholarly essay "Mama's Baby, Papa's Maybe: An American Grammar Book", one of the most cited essays in African-American literary studies. Through naming typical stereotypes ascribed to Black women, Spillers refuted the negative perceptions asserted throughout the Moynihan Report.

The essay is considered to be especially important to the field of Afro-pessimism, as many of the field's most prominent theorists—Frank Wilderson III, Saidiya Hartman, and Calvin L. Warren—draw on Spillers' ideas throughout their works. However, Spillers does not identify as an Afro-pessimist. The essay brings together Spillers' work in African-American studies, feminist theory, semiotics, and cultural studies to articulate a theory of African-American female gender construction.

In a 2006 interview entitled "Whatcha Gonna Do?—Revisiting Mama's Baby, Papa's Maybe: An American Grammar Book", Spillers shared insight into her writing process, stating that she wrote "Mama's Baby, Papa's Maybe" with a sense of hopelessness and that she was partially writing in response to All the Women Are White, All the Blacks Are Men, But Some of Us Are Brave (1982). Spillers was writing in order to create a theoretical taxonomy for Black women to be studied in the academy.

=== Black, White, and in Color ===
In 2003, she published the book Black, White, and in Color, a collection of essays from throughout her career. Some of these were inspired by the 1982 Barnard Center Conference. Spillers attended this conference and was struck by the lack of representation of Black women's sexuality. A chapter in the book, entitled "Interstices: A Small Drama of Words", re-examines the harmful characterization of Black women in literature and in society at large. Spillers argues that Black women's sexuality is poorly described in speech because of institutions of white supremacy, which in turn objectifies and silences them.

Further, Spillers claims that Black women are uniquely positioned between Black men and white women, forced to choose their gender or their race. Spillers argues that Black men are still given the agency to act upon their sex whereas women are subjected to "the paradox of nonbeing." This paradox describes how Black women's sexualities are never validated, and so they cannot sympathize with white women on the basis of sex.

=== Collaboration with other Black feminists ===
Spillers has been referenced numerous times by Black feminist lesbian group the Combahee River Collective. In an interview between Beverly Guy-Sheftall and Barbara Smith, Smith cites Spillers as one of a variety of scholars that "were able to find each other during that period" in salons. Smith, Spillers, and other Black feminists of the time formed what was known as the Afric-American Female Intelligence Society of Boston.

== Works ==
=== Books ===
==== As author ====
- Black, White, and in Color: Essays on American Literature and Culture. University of Chicago Press, 2003.

==== As editor ====
- Comparative American Identities: Race, Sex, and Nationality in the Modern Text. New York: Routledge, 1991.
- Conjuring: Black Women, Fiction, and Literary Tradition (co-edited with Marjorie Pryse). Indiana University Press, 1985.

=== Articles ===
- "'Born Again': Faulkner and the Second Birth". In Fifty Years after Faulkner, edited by Jay Watson and Ann J. Abadie, University Press of Mississippi, 2016.
- "Art Talk and the Uses of History". Small Axe, vol. 19, no. 3, 2015.
- "Views of the East Wing: On Michelle Obama". Communication and Critical/Cultural Studies, vol. 6, no. 3, 2009.
- "'Whatcha Gonna Do?': Revisiting 'Mama's Baby, Papa's Maybe: An American Grammar Book': A Conversation with Hortense Spillers, Saidiya Hartman, Farah Jasmine Griffin, Shelly Eversley, & Jennifer L. Morgan". Women's Studies Quarterly, vol. 35, no. 1/2, 2007.
- "Twentieth-Century Literature's Andrew J. Kappel Prize in Literary Criticism, 2007". Twentieth Century Literature, vol. 53, no. 2, 2007.
- "The Idea of Black Culture". CR: The New Centennial Review, vol. 6, no. 3, 2006.
- "A Tale of Three Zoras: Barbara Johnson and Black Women Writers". Diacritics, vol. 34, no. 1, 2004.
- "Topographical Topics: Faulknerian Space". Mississippi Quarterly, vol. 57, no. 4, 2004.
- "Travelling with Faulkner". Critical Quarterly, vol. 45, no. 4, 2003.
- "'All the Things You Could Be by Now, If Sigmund Freud's Wife Was Your Mother': Psychoanalysis and Race". Boundary 2, vol. 23, no. 3, 1996.
- "The Crisis of the Negro Intellectual: A Post-Date". Boundary 2, vol. 21, no. 3, 1994.
- "Moving on Down the Line". American Quarterly, vol. 40, no. 1, 1988.
- "Mama's Baby, Papa's Maybe: An American Grammar Book". Diacritics, vol. 17, no. 2, 1987.
- "'An Order of Constancy': Notes on Brooks and the Feminine". The Centennial Review, vol. 29, no. 2, 1985.
- "A Hateful Passion, a Lost Love". Feminist Studies, vol. 9, no. 2, 1983.
- "Formalism Comes to Harlem", Black American Literature Forum, vol. 16, no. 2, 1982.
- "The Works of Ralph Ellison". PMLA, vol. 95, no. 1, 1980.
- "A Day in the Life of Civil Rights". The Black Scholar, vol. 9, no. 8/9, 1978.
- "Ellison's 'Usable Past': Toward a Theory of Myth". Interpretations, vol. 9, no. 1, 1977.
- "A Lament". The Black Scholar, vol. 8, no. 5, 1977.
- "Martin Luther King and the Style of the Black Sermon". The Black Scholar, vol. 3, no. 1, 1971.

=== Reviews ===
- "Review: Kinship and Resemblances: Women on Women". Feminist Studies, vol. 11, no. 1, 1985.
- "Review: Lorraine Hansberry: Art of Thunder, Vision of Light. Special Issue of Freedomways". Signs, vol. 6, no. 3, 1981.
- "Review: 'GET YOUR ASS IN THE WATER AND SWIM LIKE ME': NARRATIVE POETRY FROM BLACK ORAL TRADITION by Bruce Jackson". The Black Scholar, vol. 7, no. 5, 1976.
- "Review: Black Popular Culture, by Michele Wallace, Gina Dent; Black Macho and the Myth of the Superwoman. by Michele Wallace; Invisibility Blues--From Pop to Theory by Michele Wallace". African American Review, vol. 29, no. 1, 1995.
