= Manman Dlo contre la fée Carabosse =

Manman Dlo contre la fée Carabosse (Water Mother Versus the Carabossa Fairy) is a French-language play in two acts, written by Martinican author Patrick Chamoiseau. As an example of a work of the Créolité movement, it focuses on indigenous and black Caribbean characters and uses many Creole words and phrases.

Taking place in La Merveille, the World of the Marvelous, the play depicts the struggle between Carabossa, who is colonizing the Caribbean with her "Greco-Latin magic", and the indigenous spirits and goddesses.

== Characters ==
- Manman Dlo, a native water goddess. The Antillean equivalent of Mami Wata and Yemaja.
- Le Conteur, the narrator, a traditional Antillean storyteller. This character also portrays Papa Zombi.
- Zita-trois-pattes, another indigenous goddess.
- Les trois filles, the daughters of Zita.
- Engagé, a creature who has sold his soul to the devil.
- Algoline, Manman Dlo's daughter.
- Bon-bleu, a nervous breadfruit.
- La Fée Carabosse, a red-haired European witch.
- Balai, Carabossa's mechanical broom.
- Marianne La Po-Figue
