= Saidiya Hartman =

American academic and writer (born 1961)

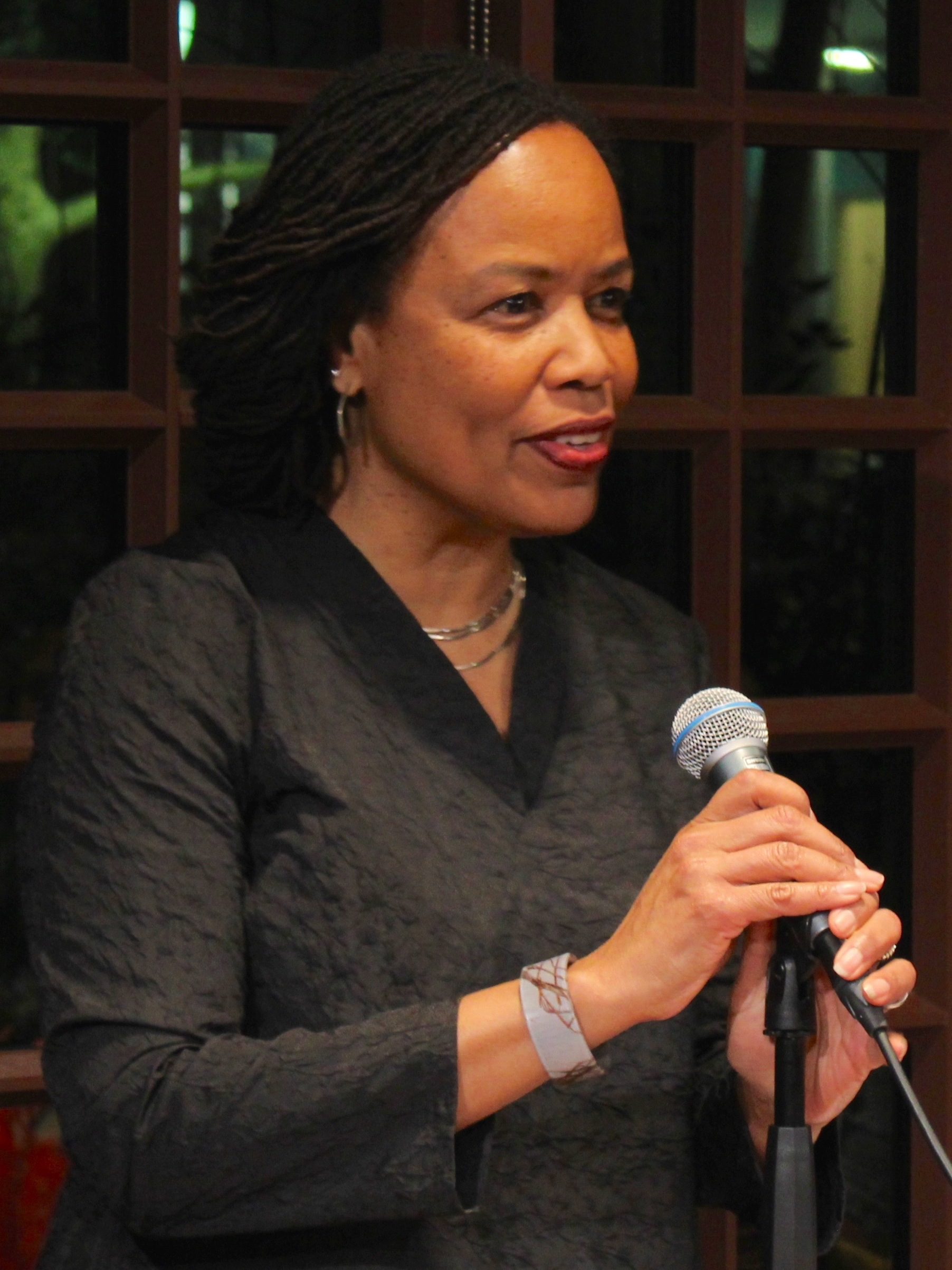
- Hartman in 2020
- Born: Valarie Hartman; 1961 (age 64–65); New York City, New York, United States
- Education: Wesleyan University (BA); Yale University (PhD)
- Occupations: Writer, academic
- Known for: Critical fabulation
- Notable work: Scenes of Subjection; Lose Your Mother; Wayward Lives, Beautiful Experiments
- Awards: MacArthur Fellow

Saidiya Hartman (born 1961) is an American academic and writer focusing on African-American studies. She is currently a professor at Columbia University in their English department. Her work focuses on African-American literature, cultural history, photography and ethics, and the intersections of law and literature.

== Early life and education ==
Hartman was born in 1961 and grew up in Brooklyn, New York City. She earned a BA from Wesleyan University and a PhD from Yale University in 1992, where she completed her doctoral dissertation, "Performing Blackness: Staging Subjection and Resistance in Antebellum Culture," in American Studies, advised by Alan Trachtenberg.

== Career ==
Hartman worked at the University of California, Berkeley, from 1992 to 2006 in the Department of English and African American Studies. In 2007, Hartman joined the faculty of Columbia University, specializing in African-American literature and history. In 2020, she was promoted to university professor at Columbia.

Hartman has been granted a Fulbright scholarship, a Rockefeller grant, and is both a Whitney Oates Fellow and University of California President's Fellow; she was awarded the 2007 Narrative Prize from Narrative Magazine and the Gustav Myers Award for Human Rights. She became a Cullman Fellow in 2016, and received the Guggenheim Fellowship in 2018. Hartman won a MacArthur Fellowship in 2019.

She was named a fellow of the American Academy of Arts and Sciences and a Royal Society of Literature International Writer in 2022. As of 2024, Hartman was elected and became an International Fellow of the British Academy due to outstanding work in the field of social sciences and cultural history surrounding African-American literature.

== Critical work ==
Hartman's major fields of interest are African-American and American literature and cultural history, slavery, law and literature, gender studies, and performance studies. She worked on the editorial board of the journal Callaloo since at least 2015.

She is the author of Scenes of Subjection: Terror, Slavery, and Self-Making in Nineteenth-Century America (1997), Lose Your Mother: A Journey Along the Atlantic Slave Route (2007), and Wayward Lives, Beautiful Experiments: Intimate Histories of Social Upheaval (2019). Hartman's work has been widely cited.

=== Theoretical concepts ===
Hartman introduced the idea of "critical fabulation" in her article "Venus in Two Acts". The term signifies a writing methodology that combines historical and archival research with critical theory and fictional narrative. Critical fabulation is a tool that Hartman uses in her scholarly practice to make productive sense of the gaps and silences in the archive of trans-Atlantic slavery that absent the voices of enslaved women. Critical fabulation takes as its point of departure the imbalances in the representation within the archive and the way that imbalance repeats slavery's structural violence. Critical fabulation is a means of telling "an impossible story" and revealing the mechanisms that impede its telling. Hartman writes: "I think of my work as bridging theory and narrative. I am very committed to a storied articulation of ideas, but working with concepts as building blocks enables me to think about situation and character as well as my own key terms." This idea is further explored through a feminist perspective in Hartman's recent contribution to the Feminist Art Coalition, The Plot Of Her Undoing (2020), wherein she discusses the necessities of resistance to an overarching and dominant masculine narrative, and the need it establishes for pushing back against frameworks pursuing the erasure of misogynistic history.

Hartman also theorizes the "afterlife of slavery" in Lose Your Mother: A Journey Along the Atlantic Slave Route. Hartman outlines this theory as slavery's imprint on all sectors of society, as evidenced in historical archives, which live on through the social structure of the society and its citizens: "skewed life chances, limited access to health and education, premature death, incarceration, and impoverishment." Hartman further fleshes out the afterlives of slavery through the ways in which photographic capture and enclosure spill into domestic spaces. She writes: "[The hallway] is the liminal zone between the inside and outside for the one who stays in the ghetto; the reformer documenting the habitat of the poor passes through without noticing it, failing to see what can be created in cramped space."

=== Study of slavery ===
Hartman has made literary and theoretical contributions to the understanding of slavery. Her first book, Scenes of Subjection: Terror, Slavery, and Self-Making in Nineteenth-Century America, is an examination of, among other topics, the intersection of slavery, gender, and the development of progressivism in the United States through the exploration of blank genealogies, memory, and the lingering effects of racism. Working through a variety of cultural materials –- diaries, journals, legal texts, slave and other narratives, and historical song and dance—Hartman explores the precarious institution of slave power.

Her second book, Lose Your Mother: A Journey Along the Atlantic Slave Route (2007), confronts the troubled relationships among memory, narratives, and representation.

More recent narratives and interviews with Hartman's revolve around the ideas of 'unfreedom', and the persistence of slavery as a concept in the modern day with the resurgence of white nationalism and xenophobia.

Frank Wilderson, who coined the term Afro-pessimism, has praised Hartman as an Afro-pessimist scholar, though Hartman herself has not called herself nor her work such.

=== Work in archives ===
Hartman has contributed insight into the forms and functions of the historical archive, providing both critiques of and methodological guides to approaching the archive in scholarly work. In both Scenes of Subjection and Lose Your Mother, Hartman accesses and critically interrogates the historical archive. In the case of Lose Your Mother, much of this is done through the combined re-reading of historical narratives of slavery and through the connection of these narratives to the physical location of Ghana. Hartman centers much of her interrogation of slavery's archive on Elmina Castle and inserts her own voice as one way to counter the silences surrounding forgotten slaves and slave narratives. Hartman also recognizes that in her use of official records in her works, she runs "the risk of reinforcing the authority of these documents even as [she tries] to use them for contrary purposes." This serves to ensure she does not suppress the archives of the Black Atlantic by way of using said archives to ensure historical integrity and narrative restraint.

Hartman introduces such a concept of narrative restraint, "the refusal to fill in the gaps and provide closure," in her previously mentioned article "Venus in Two Acts". Unable to write about the girl named Venus on the slaver ship Recovery, owing to her brief appearance in the archive, Hartman's attempts to resuscitate possible narratives for her ultimately lead to failure. Hartman restrains her desire to imaginatively recreate Venus's final days with respect to the archive and narrative restraint in mind.

=== The Promised Land ===
Hartman explains how Black people in the Diaspora, with no knowledge of their past, both try to imagine and hunger for a past promised land: "The heirs of slaves wanted a past of which they could be proud, so they conveniently forgot the distinctions between the rulers and the ruled and closed eyes to slavery in Africa. They pretended that their ancestors had once worn the king's vestments and assumed grand civilization of Asante as their own." This led to surprise when encountering Ghanaians who favored migrating to the U.S. to escape impoverishment. Hartman notes: "From where we each were standing, we did not see the same past, nor did we share a common vision of the Promised Land."

=== Wayward Lives, Beautiful Experiments ===
Hartman's work Wayward Lives, Beautiful Experiments: Intimate Histories of Riotous Black Girls, Troublesome Women, and Queer Radicals (2019) explores the lives of various Black women in Harlem and Philadelphia throughout the 1890s. Hartman describes the boundaries of Black life and womanhood through both interracial and intra-racial relationships, and critiques how Black women's sexuality was policed and constructed within an ideology of criminality around the turn of the twentieth century. She illustrates how Black women navigate society under surveillance, threat of violence, and partial or conditional citizenships. Their movements serve as acts of resistance against not only the state, but the examination of Black life by policy researchers, sociologists, and reformers aiming to "improve" Black women. Hartman also writes about the lives that slip from the archive into oblivion and are overshadowed by the figures of white and famous men, like the unnamed Black girl posed as Venus in Thomas Eakins' Photograph 308.

The work further serves to diverge from traditional slave narratives and their use of the Transatlantic, focusing more primarily on modernized scenarios of diaspora and resistance as those Hartman experienced both in New York and Ghana in order to better resonate with a young audience of survivors of surveillance and erasure. Around seven years of research went into the production went into the creation of this work.

The book won the 2019 National Book Critics Circle Award for Criticism. In 2024, The New York Times listed it as #96 in the top 100 books of the 21st century.

== Works ==
- Scenes of Subjection: Terror, Slavery, and Self-Making in Nineteenth-Century America (Oxford University Press, 1997)
- Lose Your Mother: A Journey Along the Atlantic Slave Route (Farrar, Straus and Giroux, 2007)
- "Venus in Two Acts" (Small Axe, 2008)
- Wayward Lives, Beautiful Experiments: Intimate Histories of Riotous Black Girls, Troublesome Women, and Queer Radicals (W. W. Norton & Company, 2019)
- "Notes on Feminisms 2 - The Plot of Her Undoing" (Feminist Art Coalition, 2020)
