= Tony Delsham =

French writer, novelist, and journalist (1946–2024)

- Delsham in 2016
- Born: André Pétricien; 4 February 1946 Fort-de-France, Martinique
- Died: 16 July 2024 (aged 78)
- Occupation: Novelist and journalist
- Period: 1971–2024

André Pétricien (4 February 1946 – 16 July 2024), better known by his pen name Tony Delsham, was a French writer, novelist, and journalist from Martinique. From 1990 until his death in 2024, Pétricien was editor-in-chief for Antilla. Many of his novels discuss issues such as drug abuse and AIDS.

== Biography ==
Born in Fort-de-France on 4 February 1946, Delsham's father served in the French Armed Forces during the Second World War. His family came from Grand'Rivière but Delsham finished his schooling in Schœlcher. Starting from the age of 16, Delsham worked as a concert organizer where he presented various rock and roll shows.

After obtaining his bachelor's degree in 1965, Delsham would serve in the 40th Artillery Regiment based in Châlons-sur-Marne (which later became Châlons-en-Champagne). He returned to Martinique in 1970 where he noted the "alienation of Creole thought" which he attributed, among other things, to French Radio and Television and the daily newspaper France-Antilles. Two years later he founded the press company Éditions MGG (later renamed Martinique Editions in 1999) to publish more books in the territory. Critics have praised Delsham's popular writing for his positive and realistic portrayals of women.

Delsham died on 16 July 2024, at the age of 78.

== Bibliography ==
=== Novels ===
- Le Salopard, Paris, Presses de la Circex, 1971.
- Xavier : Le drame d'un émigré antillais, Fort-de-France, Éditions M.G.G., 1981.
- Ma Justice, Fort-de-France, Éditions M.G.G., 1982.
- Les Larmes des autres, roman antillais, Fort-de-France, Éditions M.G.G., 1983.
- Lapo Farine, roman antillais, Fort-de-France, Éditions M.G.G., 1984.
- Panique aux Antilles, Fort-de-France, Éditions M.G.G., 1985.
- Tracée sans horizon, Fort-de-France, Éditions M.G.G., 1985.
- L'Impuissant, Fort-de-France, Éditions M.G.G., 1986.
- L'Ababa, Fort-de-France, Éditions M.G.G., 1987.
- Series :
  - Volume 1 : Fanm Dèwó, roman antillais, Schœlcher, MGG, 1993.
  - Volume 2 : Antan Robè, roman antillais, Schœlcher, MGG, 1994.
  - Volume 3 : Lycée Schœlcher, Schœlcher, MGG, 1995.
  - Volume 4 : Choc, Schœlcher, MGG, 1996.
  - Volume 5 : Dérives, roman antillais, Schœlcher, MGG, 1999.
- Kout fè, Schœlcher, MGG, 1994.
- Papa, est-ce que je peux venir mourir à la maison ?, Schœlcher, MGG, 1997.
- Gwo Pwèl, vies coupées, Schœlcher, MGG, 1998.
- Gueule de journaliste, Schœlcher, MGG, 1999.
- Négropolitains et euro-blacks, Schœlcher, MGG, 2000.
- Tribunal femmes bafouées, Schœlcher, Martinique Éditions, 2001.
- Chauve qui peut à Schœlcher (detective comedy), Schœlcher, Martinique Éditions, 2003.
- Series :
  - Volume 1 : M'man Lèlène, Schœlcher, Martinique Éditions, 2004.
  - Volume 2 : Une Petite Main, chargez !, Schœlcher, Martinique Éditions, 2004.
  - Volume 3 : Le Fromager, Schœlcher, Martinique Éditions, 2005.
- Paris, il faut que tu saches., Schœlcher, Martinique Éditions, 2007.

=== Bandes dessinées ===
- M.G.G, editor in chief, 1972–1975.
- Colick Blag Bo kaye, editor, 1972–1975.
- Le retour de Monsieur Coutcha (compilation), scenario by Tony Delsham, drawings by Patrick Chamoiseau (under the pseudonym "Abel ), Fort-de-France, Éditions M.G.G., 1984.
