= Jean Bernabé =

French writer from Martinique (1942–2017)

Jean Bernabé (1942 in Le Lorrain, Martinique – 12 April 2017 in Fort-De-France, Martinique) was a writer and linguist.

Bernabé was a professor of language and culture at the Université des Antilles et de la Guyane. He was an important figure in the créolité movement, having co-authored the seminal 1989 essay on the subject, Eloge de la créolité (In Praise of Creoleness), with Patrick Chamoiseau and Raphaël Confiant.

Although Bernabé's work lauds the Créole language, on which he has written seminal works, his literary creation is exclusively in the French language, to make it more accessible to international readers. However, he also had an influence on the emergence of modern literature in Créole.

== Biography ==
Bernabé studied Classics at the Sorbonne and in 1982, he defended his thesis in Linguistics on Antillean Créole titled Fondal Natal : Grammaire basilecticale approchée des Créoles guadeloupéen et martiniquais, which was published by Harmattan in 1983. From 1973, Bernabé worked at the Centre Universitaire des Antilles in Guadeloupe until it was moved to Martinique in 1982, at which point he returned to Martinique as well. In 1975, while still writing his thesis, he founded the Groupe d'Etudes et de Recherches en Espaces créolophones (GEREC) in Guadeloupe. This later became GEREC-F, the F added to acknowledge the enduring francophone presence in antillean society and the coexistence of the two languages. In 1976, he founded the journal Espace Créole.

Bernabé began writing fiction near the end of his University career, publishing his first novel, Le bailleur d'étincelle in 2002. Though written in French, his novels aim to promote and preserve Martinican oral tradition.

Bernabé was one of the founders of French creolistics and created the first modern phonemic orthography for Martinican and Guadeloupean Créole languages, as well as a lexicon compiling all French-based Créole languages. His research focused not only on linguistics but also on Créole identity. In 1989, along with Patrick Chamoiseau and Raphaël Confiant, he wrote Éloge de la créolité, presenting their vision of Créole identity and founding the créolité movement. Bernabé played an active role in the recognition of Créole in policy and education and advocated for the introduction of a Certificate of aptitude for secondary school teachers (CAPES) in Créole, for which he wrote school books on Créole spelling, grammar and literature.

Bernabé became more engaged in political matters, writing critiques online on issues such as departmentalization, migration, violence and cultural identity. He was critical of the French administration of its Overseas departments and regions, viewing it as a continuation of colonial rule, and advocating for independence. Some of his positions, including his opposition to Négritude have been controversial among his peers.

== Bibliography ==
- Fondal-Natal, essay (1976)
- Fondas-Kréyol, essay (1982)
- Eloge de la créolité, essay (1989) (with Patrick Chamoiseau and Raphaël Confiant)
- Grammaire Créole (2000)
- La Graphie créole (2001)
- La Gable créole (2001)
- Le Bailleur d'étincelle, novel (2002)
- Précis de syntaxe créole (2003)
- Le partage des ancêtres, novel (2004)
- Sur les chemins de l'histoire antillaise. Mélanges offerts à Lucien Abenon (with Serge Mam-lam-Fouck, 2006)
- La Malgeste des mornes, novel (2006)
- Litanie pour le nègre fondamental, novel (2008)
- Obidjoul (2013)
- La France, pays de race blanche (2016)
- La dérive identitariste, essay (2016)
