= L'Ajoupa-Bouillon =

- Commune
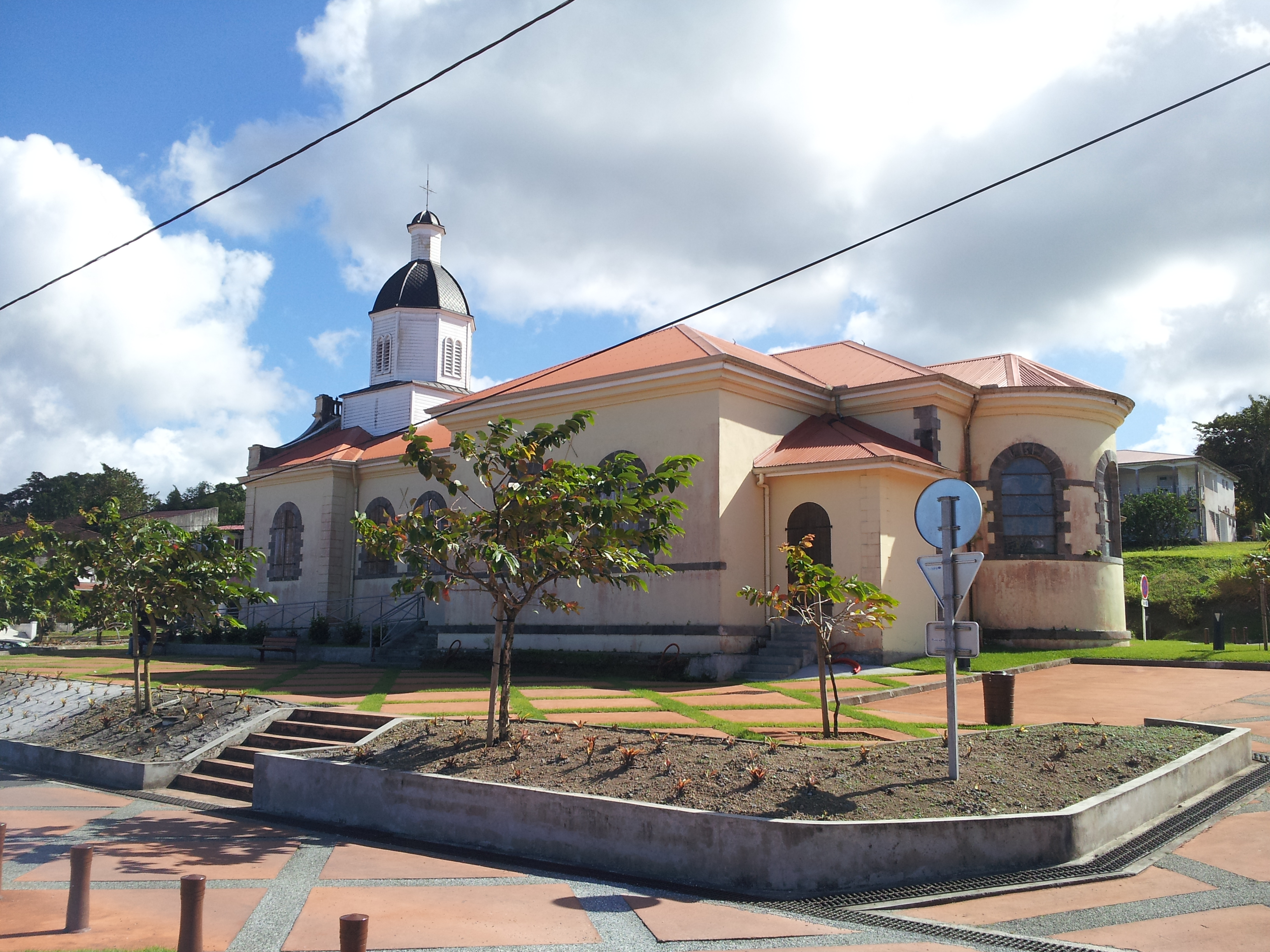
- The Church of the Immaculate Conception, in L'Ajoupa-Bouillon

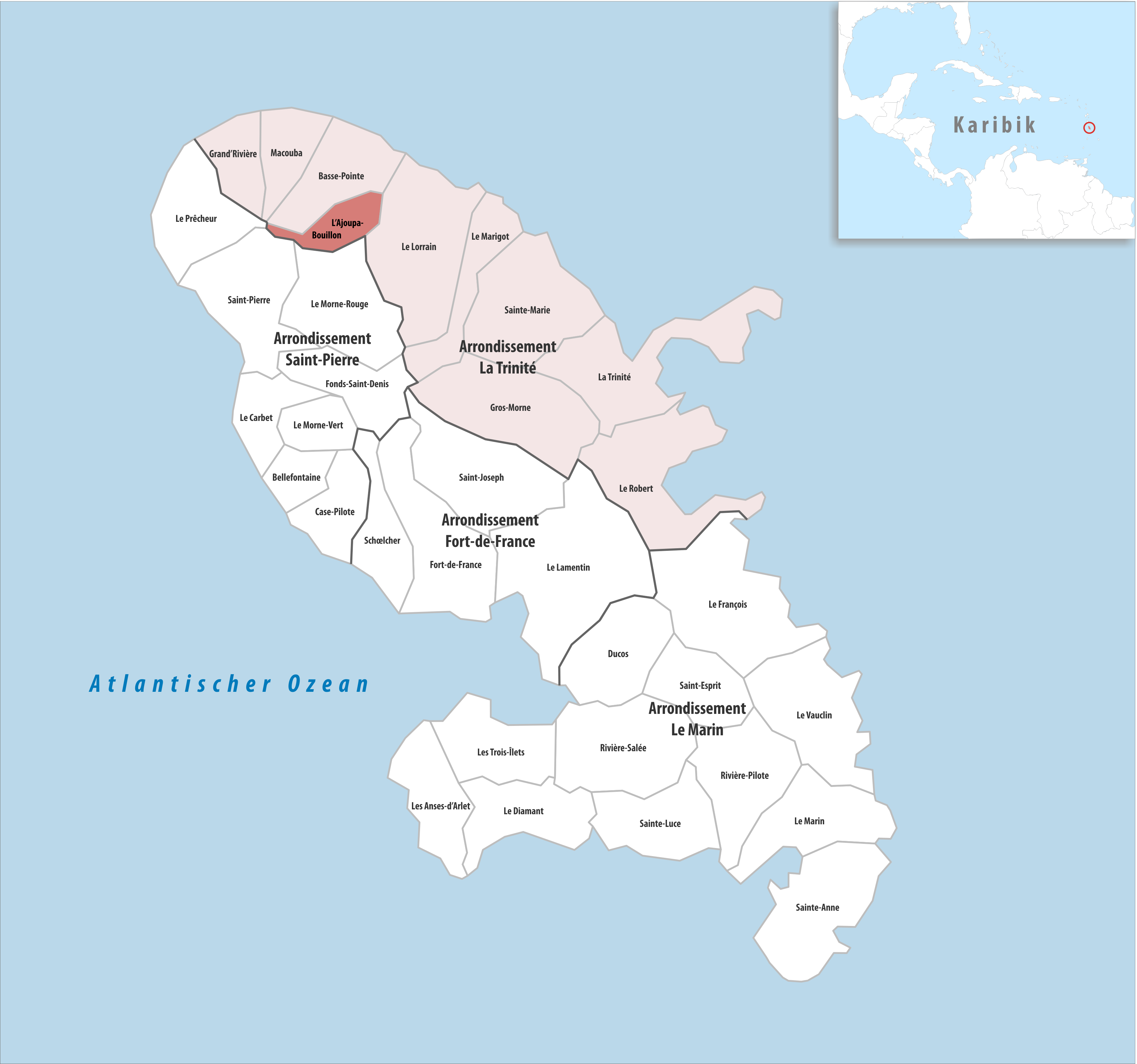
- Location of the commune (in red) within Martinique
- Location of L'Ajoupa-Bouillon
- Coordinates: 14°49′N 61°07′W
- Country: France
- Overseas region and department: Martinique
- Arrondissement: La Trinité
- Intercommunality: CA Pays Nord Martinique

Government
  - Mayor (2020–2026): Maurice Bonté
- Area^{1}: 12.30 km^{2} (4.75 sq mi)
- Elevation: 200 m (660 ft)
- Population (2023): 1,682
  - Density: 136.7/km^{2} (354.2/sq mi)
- Time zone: UTC−04:00 (AST)
- INSEE/Postal code: 97201 /97216
- ^{1} French Land Register data, which excludes lakes, ponds, glaciers > 1 km^{2} (0.386 sq mi or 247 acres) and river estuaries.

L'Ajoupa-Bouillon (French pronunciation: [laʒupa bujɔ̃]; Martinican Creole: Lajoupabouyon), commonly known as L'Ajoupa (Lajoupa), is a commune and town in the French overseas department and region, and island, of Martinique.

== Geography ==
=== Climate ===
L'Ajoupa-Bouillon has a tropical rainforest climate (Köppen climate classification Af). The average annual temperature in L'Ajoupa-Bouillon is 24.4 °C (75.9 °F). The average annual rainfall is 3,795.0 mm (149.41 in) with November as the wettest month. The temperatures are highest on average in September, at around 25.7 °C (78.3 °F), and lowest in February, at around 22.8 °C (73.0 °F). The highest temperature ever recorded in L'Ajoupa-Bouillon was 34.1 °C (93.4 °F) on 7 April 1998; the coldest temperature ever recorded was 14.2 °C (57.6 °F) on 3 February 2005.

Climate data for L'Ajoupa-Bouillon (1991–2020 averages, extremes 1978−present)
Month	Jan	Feb	Mar	Apr	May	Jun	Jul	Aug	Sep	Oct	Nov	Dec	Year
Record high °C (°F)	30.1 (86.2)	32.8 (91.0)	31.6 (88.9)	34.1 (93.4)	32.1 (89.8)	32.3 (90.1)	32.1 (89.8)	33.0 (91.4)	33.5 (92.3)	33.6 (92.5)	33.1 (91.6)	31.6 (88.9)	34.1 (93.4)
Mean daily maximum °C (°F)	26.1 (79.0)	26.1 (79.0)	26.4 (79.5)	27.3 (81.1)	28.0 (82.4)	27.9 (82.2)	28.0 (82.4)	28.8 (83.8)	29.3 (84.7)	28.8 (83.8)	27.8 (82.0)	26.7 (80.1)	27.6 (81.7)
Daily mean °C (°F)	22.9 (73.2)	22.8 (73.0)	23.0 (73.4)	23.9 (75.0)	24.8 (76.6)	25.0 (77.0)	25.1 (77.2)	25.5 (77.9)	25.7 (78.3)	25.3 (77.5)	24.6 (76.3)	23.6 (74.5)	24.4 (75.9)
Mean daily minimum °C (°F)	19.8 (67.6)	19.4 (66.9)	19.7 (67.5)	20.5 (68.9)	21.5 (70.7)	22.1 (71.8)	22.1 (71.8)	22.3 (72.1)	22.0 (71.6)	21.8 (71.2)	21.4 (70.5)	20.5 (68.9)	21.1 (70.0)
Record low °C (°F)	15.4 (59.7)	14.2 (57.6)	15.0 (59.0)	15.2 (59.4)	18.4 (65.1)	19.5 (67.1)	18.0 (64.4)	18.5 (65.3)	18.4 (65.1)	18.0 (64.4)	17.0 (62.6)	14.9 (58.8)	14.2 (57.6)
Average precipitation mm (inches)	249.5 (9.82)	172.9 (6.81)	187.9 (7.40)	276.4 (10.88)	274.1 (10.79)	288.3 (11.35)	354.2 (13.94)	381.4 (15.02)	390.1 (15.36)	405.9 (15.98)	486.9 (19.17)	327.4 (12.89)	3,795 (149.41)
Average precipitation days (≥ 1.0 mm)	24.5	20.0	19.6	19.1	19.8	22.5	26.0	25.9	22.4	24.1	25.0	23.3	272.2
Source: Météo-France

== Tourism ==
Nature aficionados can enjoy the L'Ajoupa Gardens, with a variety of plants and flowers. Furthermore, a long walk called "Gorges De La Falaise", starting from the commune centre, lead the people to the core of the tropical forest, with some marked halts at cascades and important points.

== Population ==
Historical population
Year	Pop.	±% p.a.
1967	1,855	—
1974	1,864	+0.07%
1982	1,731	−0.92%
1990	1,739	+0.06%
1999	1,761	+0.14%
2007	1,659	−0.74%
2012	1,788	+1.51%
2017	1,874	+0.94%
2023	1,682	−1.79%
Source: INSEE

== See also ==
- Communes of Martinique
