= Black Skin, White Masks =

1952 book by Frantz Fanon

- The cover of the first edition
- Author: Frantz Fanon
- Original title: Peau noire, masques blancs
- Translator: Charles L. Markmann (1967); Richard Philcox (2008)
- Language: French
- Series: Collections Esprit. La condition humaine
- Subjects: Black race Racial discrimination Racism; Nigrescence
- Publisher: Éditions du Seuil (France); Grove Press (US)
- Publication date: 1952
- Publication place: France
- English publication date: 1967
- Media type: Print
- Pages: 222

Black Skin, White Masks (French: Peau noire, masques blancs) is a 1952 book by philosopher-psychiatrist Frantz Fanon. The book is written in the style of autoethnography, with Fanon sharing his own experiences while presenting a historical critique of the effects of racism and dehumanization, inherent in situations of colonial domination, on the human psyche.

The violent overtones in Fanon can be broken down into two categories: The violence of the colonizer through annihilation of body, psyche, culture, along with the demarcation of space, and secondly, the violence of the colonized as an attempt to retrieve dignity, sense of self, and history through anti-colonial struggle.

== Summary ==
Black Skin, White Masks applies a historical critique on the complex ways in which identity, particularly Blackness, is constructed and produced. Fanon confronts complex formations of colonized psychic constructions of Blackness. He applies psychoanalysis to explain the feelings of dependency and inadequacy that black people experience. Fanon portrays white people as having a deep-seated fear of educated blacks.

He argues that, no matter how assimilated to white norms a black person may become, whites will always exercise a sense of 'inferiority.' This way of thinking was designed to keep 'Blacks' stuck in an "inferior status within a colonial order." The divided self-perception of a Black Subject who has lost his native cultural origin, and embraced the culture of the Mother Country, produces an inferior sense of self in the "Black Man."

The Black Man will try to appropriate and imitate the culture of the colonizer—donning the "white masks" of the book's title. Such behavior is more readily evident in upwardly mobile and educated Black people who can afford to acquire status symbols within the world of the colonial ecumene, such as an education abroad and mastery of the language of the colonizer.

Based upon, and derived from, the concepts of the collective unconscious and collective catharsis, the sixth chapter, "The Negro and Psychopathology", presents brief, deep psychoanalyses of colonized black people, and thus proposes the inability of black people to fit into the norms (social, cultural, racial) established by white society (the colonizer). That "a normal Negro child, having grown up in a normal Negro family, will become abnormal on the slightest contact of the white world." That, in a white society, such an extreme psychological response originates from the unconscious and unnatural training of black people, from early childhood, to associate "blackness" with "wrongness".

That unconscious mental training of black children is effected with comic books and cartoons, which are cultural media that instil and affix, in the mind of the white child, the society's cultural representations of black people as villains. When black children are exposed to images of villainous black people, the children will experience a psychopathology (psychological trauma), which mental wound becomes inherent to their individual, behavioral make-up: a part of the child's personality. That the early-life suffering of said psychopathology – black skin associated with villainy – creates a collective nature among the men and women who were reduced to colonized populations.

In Black Skin, White Masks, Fanon speaks about Mayotte Capécia and Abdoulaye Sadji, writers contemporary with him. Fanon describes I Am a Martinican Woman and Nini, mulâtresse du Sénégal as examples of some of the cultural damage of colonization. Capécia, a black woman, wants to marry a white man despite the social and cultural boundaries in place. Fanon believes Capécia is desperate for white approval. The colonial culture has left an impression on black Martinican women to believe that "whiteness is virtue and beauty" and that they can in turn "save their race by making themselves whiter."

In section B of chapter seven, on "The Black Man and Hegel", Fanon examines the dialectics of the philosopher and conveys his suspicions of the black man being under the rubric of a philosophy modeled after whiteness. According to Fanon there is a conflict that takes form internally as self-deprecation because of this white philosophical affirmation.

== Reception ==
First published in French in Paris, Black Skin, White Masks (1952) did not attract much mainstream attention in English-speaking countries. It explored the effects of colonialism and imposing a servile psychology upon the colonized man, woman, and child. The adverse effects were assessed as part of the post-colonial cultural legacy of the Mother Country to former imperial subjects. The book was translated into English by Charles L. Markmann, and published by Grove Press in 1967. In 2008 Grove published a new translation of the book, by Richard Philcox, which, it claims, "updates its language for a new generation of readers". Opinions are mixed as to which translation is preferable.

Together with Fanon's The Wretched of the Earth, it received wider attention during cultural upheavals starting in the 1960s, in the United States as well as former colonial countries in the Caribbean and Africa. It is considered an important anti-colonial, anti-racist, and Afro-pessimist work in Anglophone countries. But in Francophone countries, the book is ranked as a relatively minor Fanon work in comparison to his later, more radical works. The topic is explicitly connected culturally to the societies of the ethnic African and other peoples of color living within the French Colonial Empire (1534–1980).

Black Skin, White Masks has been criticized as sexist and homophobic. Among other statements, the book contains the remarks, "Just as there are faces that just ask to be slapped, couldn't we speak of women who just ask to be raped", and "when a woman lives the fantasy of rape by a black man, it is a kind of fulfilment of a personal dream or an intimate wish", and "the Negrophobic man is a repressed homosexual".

Some of the book's psychological and psychiatric insights remain valid, especially as applied by peoples of diverse colonial and imperial histories, such as the Palestinians and Kurds in the Middle East, the Tamils in Sri Lanka, the African Americans in the US, and Puerto Ricans, in their contemporary struggles for cultural and political autonomy. Contemporary theorists of nationalism and of anti-colonialism, of liberation theology and of cultural studies, have preferred Frantz Fanon's later culturally and politically revolutionary works, such as The Wretched of the Earth (1962).

Black Skin, White Masks continues to generate debate. In 2015, leading African studies scholar Lewis R. Gordon published a book titled What Fanon Said: A Philosophical Introduction To His Life And Thought.

Anthony Elliott writes that Black Skin, White Masks is a seminal work.

== Freedom and Blackness ==
Freedom and Blackness, according to Sidney Mintz, is not a culture deliberately set upon breaking "cultural rules and norms"; instead, its focus is to be free. Free to express themselves in a way that is authentic to the Caribbean culture, and free to be able to live free from those who were once called master. A culture separate from that of their European colonizers yet still be recognized on an equal level. This movement of freedom and blackness requires knowledge on multiple interdisciplinary studies, such as politics for emancipation, racial inequalities and post-emancipation, all within the context of a post-colonial world.

Colonization, instead of helping countries, has destroyed culture all over the world. Colonization has enforced the thought process of "white supremacy" and has suppressed/eradicated cultures all over the Caribbean. An example of this, according to Fanon, is the Malagasy culture. He explains that the Malagasy culture has been colonized so much that if they were to be liberated, they would be left with nothing. Fanon regulates imagination of Blackness by his willingness to merely "envisage" through a rubric of epidermalization, which is yet another form of enclosure.

== Body Schema ==
Fanon reworks phenomenologist Maurice Merleau-Ponty's concept of the "body schema" in the fifth chapter of Black Skin, White Masks. For Merleau-Ponty, the body schema refers to the set of tendencies or habits a body acquires in its interaction with the world, typically operating at a preconscious or nonconscious level. He famously claims that "acquiring a habit [is] the reworking and renewal of the body schema." Fanon challenges this understanding by arguing that the body schema is not simply shaped by habitual bodily action but by an "implicit knowledge" of the world that is inherently social and racialized. For Fanon, the formation of one's bodily awareness is from the outset marked by sociogenesis, that is, by social and historical forces.

On this basis, Fanon introduces the concept of the historical racial schema, emphasizing that Black individuals acquire their body schema under the white gaze within a white-dominated world. The racist discourses and practices that saturate this world shape how Black bodies are perceived and lived. This schema offers an account of how the lived experience of Blackness, always positioned as inferior and cast as a phobic or hated object—is inseparable from the long history of racism, slavery, and colonialism. These historical processes are woven into the very conditions of Black being-in-the-world, such that the experience of Black existence is haunted by a structural and inescapable alienation.

From this, Fanon develops a third schema: the epidermal racial schema. This concept articulates the lived experience of self-alienation specific to Black existence. In this schema, the Black subject is forced to adopt the white gaze, perceiving themselves as the object constructed by racist stereotypes. As Fanon writes, "disoriented, incapable of confronting the Other, ... I transported myself on that particular day far, very far, from myself and gave myself up as an object" (92). By focusing on the epidermis, the surface of the skin, Fanon highlights how racism is not only discursive but deeply embodied. He implies that any critique of racism that overlooks its phenomenological and affective dimensions is ultimately insufficient.

Fanon's theorization of the body schema, historical racial schema, and epidermal racial schema has deeply influenced later thinkers in Black Studies and critical race theory. Scholars such as Hortense Spillers, Fred Moten, Calvin Warren, and Rizvana Bradley have taken up his emphasis on the visceral experience of racial objectification and the body as a site where racism is enacted. The notion of the "epidermal" also inspires Simone Browne's concept of digital epidermalization, which explores how the mechanisms Fanon described continue to operate in contemporary digital surveillance technologies.

== Phobogenesis ==
Phobogenesis is a term derived from psychiatry and psychoanalysis, and is specifically obtained from the concept of the phobic object. This is a thing or person that elicits "irrational feelings of dread, fear, and hate" in a subject, and whose threat is often exaggerated. In the context of race, Fanon postulates that the black person is a phobogenic object, sparking anxiety in the eyes of white subjects. Fanon's definition of phobia is based on that of French psychologist Angelo Hesnard, who defined phobia as a "neurosis characterized by the anxious fear of an object (in the broadest sense of anything outside the individual) or, by extension, of a situation". Thus, black people as a phobogenic object elicit insecurity in white people.

Fanon follows Hesnard's definition to assert that this insecurity causes both fear and hatred of the phobogenic object at the same time. Therefore, in Fanon's theory, the white subject finds the black person both revolting and threatening simultaneously. The reaction induced by the phobogenic object is extremely irrational and exaggerated, as is the danger posed by it. The object is attributed "evil intentions and ... a malefic power", giving excessive weight to its threat to the white subject. This reaction prioritizes emotion and affect in a manner that "defies all rational thinking", Fanon's words, highlighting that the psychiatric aspect of racial hatred is not clearly or rationally explicable. As described by Fanon, the whole ideology sticks to one principle of perspective (the picture or illusion in one's mind) about something to convey a feeling or attitude.

== See also ==
- Afro-pessimism
- Cultural studies
- Inversion in post-colonial theory
- Pan-Africanism
- Post-colonial literature
- Post-colonialism
- The Colonizer and the Colonized (1965), by Albert Memmi
- The Wretched of the Earth (1961), by Frantz Fanon
- Culture of Martinique
