= Afro-pessimism (critical framework) =

Theoretical framework that connects Blackness and social death

Afro-pessimism is a critical framework that describes the ongoing effects of racism, colonialism, and historical processes of enslavement, including the transatlantic slave trade and their impact on structural conditions as well as the personal, subjective, and lived experience and embodied reality of Black people.

== Definitions ==
In the 2018 Oxford Bibliography entry on Afro-pessimism written by Patrice Douglass, Selamawit D. Terrefe, and Frank B. Wilderson III, Afro-pessimism can be understood as "a lens of interpretation that accounts for civil society's dependence on anti-Black violence—a regime of violence that positions Black people as internal enemies of civil society". They argue this violence "cannot be analogized with the regimes of violence that disciplines the Marxist subaltern, the postcolonial subaltern, the colored but nonblack Western immigrant, the nonblack queer, or the nonblack woman".

According to Wilderson, the scholar who coined the term as it functions most popularly today, Afro-pessimism theorizes Blackness as a position of, using the language of scholar Saidiya Hartman, "accumulation and fungibility", that is as a condition of, or relation to, ontological death, as opposed to a cultural identity or human subjectivity.

Jared Sexton locates the foundational thread of Afro-pessimism in the "motive force of a singular wish inherited in no small part from Black women's traditions of analysis, interpretation, invention, and survival". As opposed to humanist anthropologists, historians, sociologists, and political scientists who engage the history of Black subjectivity as one of entrenched political discrimination and social ostracization, Afro-pessimists across disciplines have argued that Black people are constitutively excluded from the category of the self-possessing, rights-bearing human being of modernity. Wilderson writes that "Blacks do not function as political subjects; instead, our flesh and energies are instrumentalized for postcolonial, immigrant, LGBT, and workers' agendas."

== History and influences ==
Wilderson has cited the work of Saidiya Hartman, Zakiyyah Iman Jackson, Joy James, Achille Mbembe, Christina Sharpe, Hortense Spillers, and Sylvia Wynter as influences and predecessors of the framework, although not of all these scholars agree with such characterization of their own work. Sharpe has named Dionne Brand, particularly her 2001 work A Map to the Door of No Return: Notes to Belonging, as writing in conversation with the concepts of Afro-pessimism by "mapping and creating a language for thinking, for articulating Black (social) life lived alongside, under, and in the midst of the ordinary and extraordinary terror of enforced Black social death".

Other accounts have traced similar lines of thinking to Frantz Fanon and 20th-century Black revolutionary movements, such as the Black Power movement. In the late 20th century, scholars including Derrick Bell, Lewis Gordon, and Cornel West developed concepts of antagonism and abjection that bear similarities to components of Afro-pessimism but without reaching the same conclusions.

== Reception ==
Orlando Patterson's book Slavery and Social Death, first published in 1982, forms a theoretical point of departure for almost all strands of Afro-pessimism. In a 2018 interview about the Kerner Report, Patterson had this to say about Afro-pessimism:

We're going through a period of extreme despair about the situation of African-Americans. The most extreme form of this despair is a movement called Afro-pessimism, which holds that Black Americans are still viewed as they were viewed in the slavery days as different, inferior, and as outsiders. I find myself in an odd situation because the Afro-pessimists draw heavily on one of my books, 'Slavery and Social Death,' which is ironic, because I'm not a pessimist. I don’t think we're in a situation of social death, because one of the elements of social death is that you're not recognized as an integral member of the civic community, the public sphere, and we certainly are, on the political and cultural levels. And we're very integrated in the military, which is the quintessence of what defines who belongs. The Afro-pessimists are right, though, to point to persisting segregation in the private sphere.

Shaul Magid compares Afropessimism with the view of antisemitism as inherent to non-Jewish society and therefore unsolvable. He argues that both movements are not making empirical claims, but rather theological or ontological ones.

== See also ==
- Black Skin, White Masks
- Anti-Black racism
