= Jacqueline Manicom =

French writer (1935–1976)

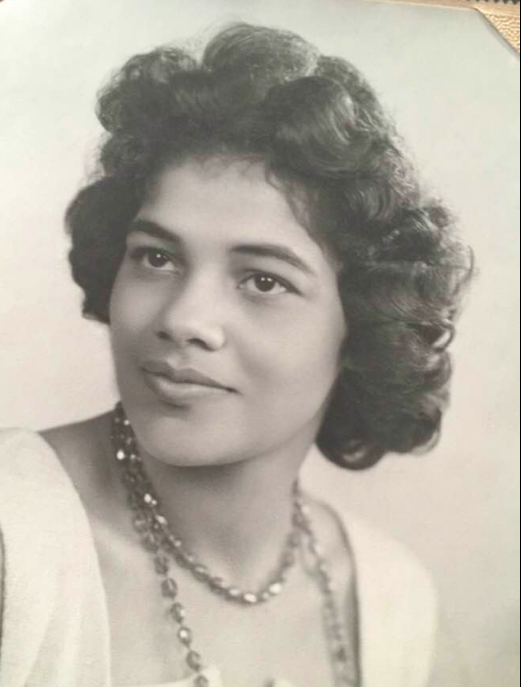
- Manicom in 1961
- Born: 1935; Guadeloupe
- Died: 1976 (aged 40–41)
- Occupations: Writer, midwife

Jacqueline Manicom (1935–1976) was a Guadeloupean writer, professor, broadcaster, feminist, and midwife, author of the novels Mon examen de blanc (1972) and La graine : journal d'une sage-femme (1974).

== Early life ==
Manicom was born in Guadeloupe, the eldest of twenty children born to parents of South Asian origin. She trained as a midwife, and studied law and philosophy in Paris.

== Career ==
Manicom worked at a public hospital in Paris as a young woman. She also worked in radio and television, and taught philosophy courses. In the late 1960s she worked with Simone de Beauvoir on women's rights in France, was a founding member of Choisir la Cause des Femmes (CHOISIR), and especially focused her activism on the legalization of abortion. She and her husband founded a family planning clinic in Guadeloupe.

Manicom wrote two autobiographical novels in French, Mon examen de blanc (1972) and La graine : journal d'une sage-femme (1974), both stories of Caribbean immigrant women in medical settings, both with themes of race, class, gender, and sexuality in the context of French colonialism and French Caribbean independence.

== Personal life ==
Manicom married philosophy professor Yves Letourneur. They had two children. She died in 1976, aged 41.
