= Raphaël Confiant =

Martiniquan writer

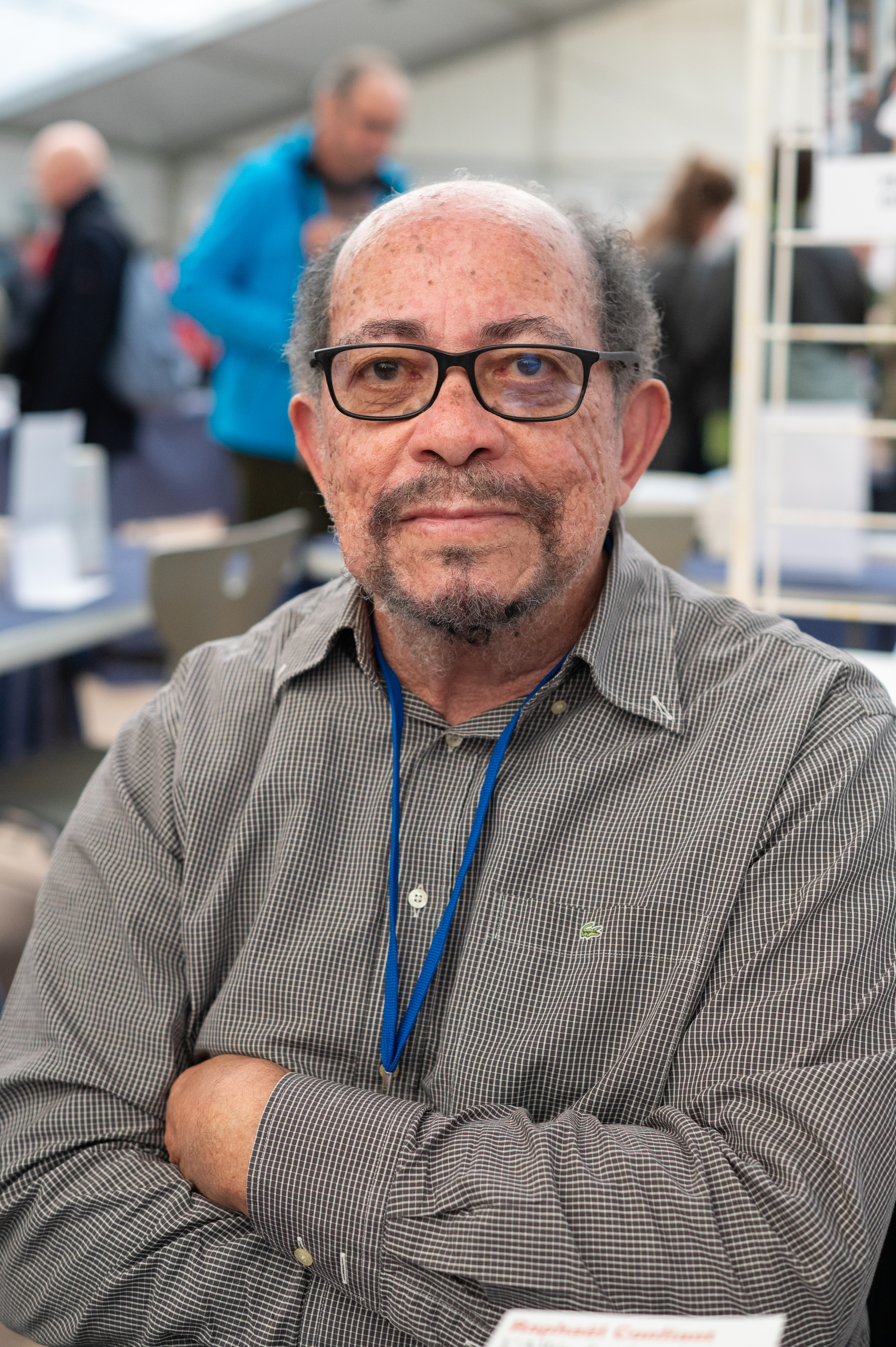
- Raphaël Confiant au festival international de géographie 2024
- Born: January 25, 1951; Le Lorrain
- Occupations: Writer, poet, professor
- Years active: 1979–present
- Movement: Créolité
- Awards: Prix littéraire des Caraïbes (1989); Casa de las Américas Prize (1993); Casa de las Américas Prize (2016); Prix Carbet de la Caraïbe et du Tout-Monde (1994); Prix RFO du livre (1998); Prix Tropiques (2010); Prix Décembre (1991)

Raphaël Confiant (French: [ʁafaɛl kɔ̃fjɑ̃]; born January 25, 1951) is a Martinican writer known for his literary commitment towards Creole literature.

== Life and career ==
Raphaël Confiant was born in Le Lorrain, Martinique. He studied English and political science at the Sciences Po Aix and law at Paul Cézanne University in Aix-en-Provence, France. During the 1970s, Confiant became a militant proponent of use of the Creole language and later worked with Jean Bernabé and Patrick Chamoiseau to create the créolité movement. The three authors co-authored in 1989 the seminal text of the créolité movement, Éloge de la créolité (French for 'In Praise of Creoleness'), in addition to other theoretical texts. The créolité movement is often characterized as a reaction to the Négritude movement, which emphasized the African origins of the Antillean people. Créolité, on the other hand, emphasizes the diversity of Antillean ancestry and cultural heritage, which includes Chinese, Indian, and European influences, among others. The movement seeks to understand the diverse identities and histories of the people of the Antilles through the lens of literature and language and eschews the universal in favor of a diverse view of language and identity. Confiant is highly critical of Négritude and in 1993, he published a critique of Négritude founder Aimé Césaire called Aimé Césaire: une traversée paradoxale du siècle (Aimé Césaire: a Paradoxical Journey Across the Century).

Confiant is a well-known writer in both Creole and French and was a lecturer at the University of the French West Indies and Guiana (UAG). He served as dean of the Faculty of Arts and Humanities at UAG from 2013 to 2016.

After publishing his first novels in Creole and suffering very poor sales, Confiant took another approach in 1988 by publishing his first French-language novel, Le Nègre et l'Amiral, set in Martinique during World War II. The novel was welcomed by the French literary crowd as a new voice in French-language literature. Narrowly missing the Goncourt Prize in 1991 with his second French novel, Eau de Café, Confiant has ever since continued writing in French, even translating his first Creole-language novels. The themes of some of his novels seem to be dictated by the anniversaries of French West Indian events like the 1902 Mount Pelée eruption (with Nuée Ardente, published in 2002) or the 1854 arrival of East-Indian indentured servants (La Panse du Chacal, 2004).

== Bibliography ==
=== In Creole ===
- Jik dèyè do Bondyé, short stories, 1979
- Jou Baré, poems, 1981
- Bitako-a, novel, 1985
- Kòd Yanm, novel, 1986
- Marisosé, novel, 1987
- Dictionnaires des titim et sirandanes, 1997

=== In French ===
- Le Nègre et l'Amiral, novel, 1988, Prix Antigone
- Eloge de la créolité, essay, 1989 (with Jean Bernabé and Patrick Chamoiseau)
- Lettres créoles: tracées antillaises et continentales de la littérature (1635–1975), essay, 1991
- Eau de Café, novel 1991, Prix Novembre
- Ravines du devant-jour, narration, 1993, Prix Casa de las Americas
- Commandeur du sucre, narration, 1993
- Aimé Césaire, une traversée paradoxale du siècle, essay, 1993
- L'Allée des Soupirs, novel, 1994, Prix Carbet de la Caraïbe et du Tout-Monde
- Bassin des ouragans, narration, 1994
- Les maîtres de la parole créole, story, 1995
- Contes créoles, story, 1995
- Le Gouverneur des dés, narration, 1995
- Mamzelle Libellule, novel, 1995. Mamzelle Dragonfly, trans. Linda Coverdale (Farrar Straus & Giroux, 1999)
- La Savane des pétrifications, narration, 1995
- La Vierge du Grand Retour, novel, 1996
- La baignoire de Joséphine, narration, 1997
- Le Meurtre de Samedi-Gloria, novel, 1997, Prix RFO du livre
- L'archet du colonel, novel, 1998
- Régisseur du rhum, narration, 1999
- Le Cahier de Romance, narration, 2000
- Brin d'amour, novel, 2001
- Nuée ardente, narration, 2002
- La Panse du Chacal, novel, 2004
- Adele et la Pacotillieuse, novel, 2005
- Trilogie tropicale, 2006
- Nègre marron, 2006
- Case à Chine, 2007
- Les Ténèbres extérieures, 2008
- Black is Black, 2008
- Le Chien fou et le Fromager, 2008
- L'Hôtel du Bon Plaisir, 2009
- La Jarre d'or, 2010
- Citoyens au-dessus de tout soupçon, roman policier, 2010
- Du rififi chez les fils de la veuve, roman policier, 2012
- Rue des Syriens, 2012
- Les Saint-Aubert, L'en-allée du siècle 1900-1920, 2012
- Bal masqué à Békéland, roman policier, 2013
- Le Bataillon créole, 2013
- Les Saint-Aubert, Les trente-douze mille douleurs 1920-1940, 2014
- Citoyens au-dessus de tout soupçon..., 2014
- Madame St-Clair, reine de Harlem, 2015
- Du rififi chez les fils de la veuve, 2017
- L'épopée mexicaine de Romulus Bonnaventure, 2018
- L'Enlèvement du mardi gras, 2019
- Grand Café Martinique, 2020
- Deux détonations, 2020
- Du Morne-des-Esses au Djebel, 2020
- La Muse ténébreuse de Charles Baudelaire, 2021
