= Texaco (novel) =

1992 French novel by Patrick Chamoiseau

Texaco is a 1992 novel by Patrick Chamoiseau, a French author who was born and raised in Martinique. The book was awarded the Prix Goncourt in its year of publication. It was translated into English from the original French and Creole by Rose-Myriam Réjouis and Val Vinokurov and selected as a New York Times Notable Book of the Year in 1997.

== Plot ==
The novel presents a historical and personal perspective of Texaco, a shantytown suburb just outside Martinique's capital Fort-de-France. The main narrative of the story is told through the voice of Marie-Sophie Laborieux, daughter of a freed slave, who recounts her family history from the beginning of the 1820s through to the late 20th century. These recollections of her history draw both on her personal memory and the stories told to her by her father. The accounts begin after a man called Christ – an employee of the urban services bureau tasked to rationalize the shantytown of Texaco – is sent to Marie-Sophie. In describing his impact on her community, Marie-Sophie refers to Christ as "one of the riders of our apocalypse" and "the angel of destruction".

Texaco follows a non-linear plot line, with Marie-Sophie's personal narrative providing an account of history viewed from the perspective of her family. As Marie-Sophie puts it: "I began to tell him the story of our Quarter and of our conquest of the City, to speak in the name of us all, pleading our cause, telling my life." In addition to this complex story arrangement, Chamoiseau weaves in brief excerpts from notebooks, journals and letters. These small sections, which provide a historical context to the island of Martinique, are attributed to journals written by Marie-Sophie in the mid-1960s, as well as passages from a book called The Urban Planner's Notes to the World Scratcher.

=== Protagonists ===
Marie-Sophie Laborieux is the narrator and daughter of Esternome and Idoménée. She lost her parents at a young age, selling fish in the city and working as a housekeeper before building a home in Texaco and becoming a leader of her community.

Esternome (Marie-Sophie's father) is the focal point for half of Texaco. He was born on a plantation but worked as a house slave until being granted freedom after saving the plantation owner (béké)'s life.

== Major themes and ideas ==
=== Language ===
In a New York Times article from 1997, Leonard Michaels emphasized the importance of language from the perspective of the narrator: "Written words – diaries, letters, notebooks – are regularly quoted, but Marie-Sophie's living word is the heart of the novel. And it is she who raises the book's central thematic preoccupation, which is language."

In a Los Angeles Times review of the same year, Jonathan Levi said: "As heroic as the tales of Marie-Sophie, her papa, Esternome, and mama, Idomenee, it is Chamoiseau's chabin language that is the true heroine of 'Texaco'. Marie-Sophie's battles...are nothing less than the wars between French and Creole, between the classic and the patois, the colonizer and the colonized."

=== Spirituality and spiritual identity ===
Texaco begins with the introduction of the character Christ. New York Times reviewer Leonard Michaels noted: "The city-planner Christ is meant, as one imagines, to be seen initially as the god of suffering, annihilating local customs and beliefs in exchange for abstract redemption... Thus he mirrors the relationship between Christian France and the multiracial, multilingual descendants of black slaves, who have fashioned a sizable part of their identity out of the manner, traits and blood of their oppressors."

=== Magical realism ===
In Texaco there are several uses of magical realism. Oona Patrick describes it as integral and necessary to the book because: "...using magical realism is the only way this story could be told in full, natural because the magic emanates from an existing culture's beliefs."

== Impact ==
Novelist and essayist Caryl Phillips noted that Texaco has had a significant impact on the advancement on French Caribbean history: “Patrick Chamoiseau has emerged at an important time in French Caribbean literature... he has helped the writers and the intellectuals of the French Caribbean to recognize the importance of oral transmission."

Marie José Nzengou-Tayo's article "Literature and Diglossia: The Poetics of French and Creole 'intellect' in Patrick Chamoiseau's Texaco" argues that the novel is significant in providing an expression of Creolization through its use of simile and metaphorical terms to express abstract ideas and give voice to oral stories, beliefs and myths.

In 2009, Wasafiri magazine included Texaco on its list of 25 Most Influential Books published in the previous quarter-century.

== External sources ==
- 1997 Los Angeles Times review of Texaco by Jonathan Levi
- 2012 Mail & Guardian article about Texaco by Percy Zvomuya
