= Omise'eke Natasha Tinsley =

American professor and writer (b. 1971)

- Citizenship: American
- Occupation: Professor
- Employer: University of California, Santa Barbara
- Known for: Black Studies, African and African Diaspora Studies
- Notable work: Beyoncé in Formation: Remixing Black Feminism

Omise'eke Natasha Tinsley is Professor of Black Studies at the University of California, Santa Barbara. Previously she was an Associate Professor of African and African Diaspora Studies at the University of Texas at Austin. She is trained in literary critique, and does work in Caribbean Studies, Black Diaspora Studies, Gender and Women's Studies, and Pop Culture Studies. She is the author of Thiefing Sugar: Eroticism between Women in Caribbean Literature (Duke University Press, 2010), and Ezili′s Mirrors: Imagining Black Queer Genders (Duke University Press, 2018). She received the F.O. Matthiessen Visiting Professorship of Gender and Sexuality at Harvard for the 2018–2019 school year. Her latest work Beyoncé in Formation: Remixing Black Feminism (University of Texas Press, 2018) was published in November 2018. It is based on her course at University of Texas Austin entitled Beyoncé Feminism, Rihanna Womanism, which launched in Spring 2015.

She received her Ph.D. in Comparative Literature at the University of California, Berkeley in 2003.

== Beyoncé in Formation: Remixing Black Feminism ==
Tinsley released Beyoncé in Formation: Remixing Black Feminism in 2018 through the University of Texas Press. Tinsley was inspired to write the book after moving to Texas as a new mother and black woman and really connecting to Beyoncé, who herself is a black mother from Texas. She started teaching the course "Beyoncé Feminism, Rihanna Womanism" in 2015, which proved to be very popular with the student body. Tinsley was approached about writing a book sometime after the release of the critically acclaimed album Lemonade in 2016 and was inspired by the record to write Beyoncé in Formation. The book uses songs and lyrics from Lemonade to explain feminist theories, specifically ideas surrounding black feminism, as well as including stories from the author's own life that help explain why she (and so many others) have such a strong connection to Beyoncé's work. In the introduction of the book, Tinsley describes it as "a popular music study and a memoir, this book puts Lemonade in conversations with representations of black Southern femininities from blues to New Orleans bounce, quadroon balls to the Country Music Awards, and Love and Hip Hop: Atlanta to #BlackTransLivesMatter."

The book is broken down into three sections, with each one highlighting a different aspect of black feminism that Beyoncé utilizes in Lemonade:

- Family Album: Making Lemonade out of Marriage, Motherhood and Southern Tradition
- "Most Bomb Pussy": Toward Black Feminist Pleasure Politics
- Calling for Freedom: Black Women's Activism in the US South

In each section, Tinsley cites specific Beyoncé lyrics and music video visuals to support the theories that she outlines throughout the book.
