= Abdoulaye Sadji =

Senegalese writer (1910–1961)

Abdoulaye Sadji (1910 in Rufisque, Senegal – 25 December 1961 in Dakar) was a Senegalese writer and teacher.

== Life ==
The son of a Muslim priest, a marabout, Sadji was educated in a Quranic school before attending French schools. After training as a teacher at the École Normale William Ponty in Gorée, he became one of the first African high-school teachers, working in various parts of Senegal. In 1932, he became only the second Senegalese person to earn a bachelor's degree.

In the 1950s, Sadji worked for a radio station in Dakar and in 1953, together with Léopold Sédar Senghor, he wrote a reading-book for elementary schools. Entitled La Belle Histoire de Leuk-le-Lièvre, this book preserves traditional Senegalese oral tales and is regarded as a classic collection of traditional stories from Africa. As one of the founders of Négritude, Senghor referred to Sadji as a pioneering practitioner of the values associated with Négritude.

Sadji published two novels, Maïmouna: petite fille noire (1953) and Nini, mulâtresse du Sénégal (1954), along with a number of short stories, of which "Tounka" (1952) and "Modou-Fatim" (1960) are the best-known. His works often revolve around young girls from the countryside who are trying to adapt to a life in the city.
