= Patrick Chamoiseau =

Martiniquais writer (born 1953)

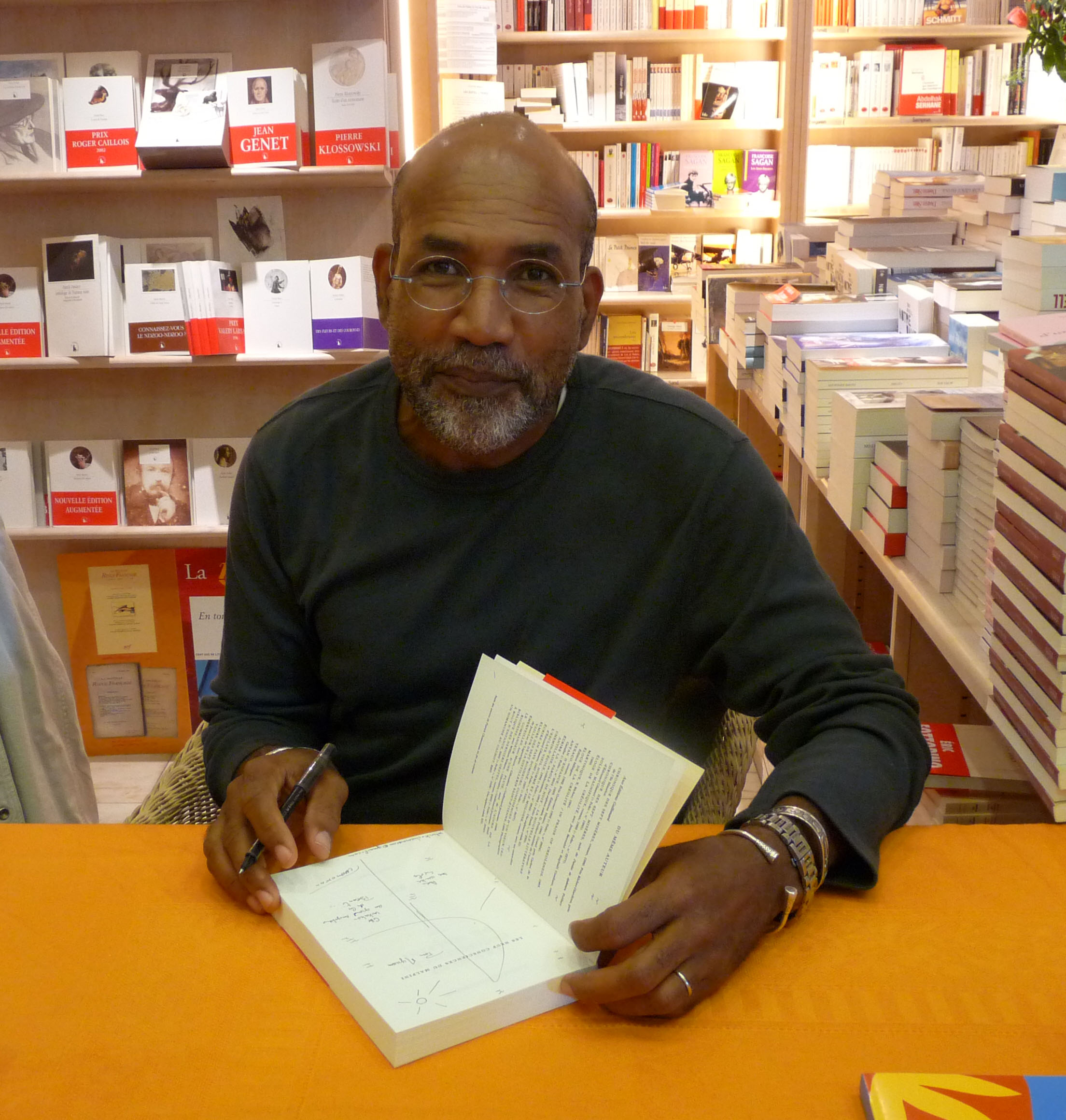
- Chamoiseau in Strasbourg, June 2009
- Born: 3 December 1953 (age 72); Fort-de-France, Martinique
- Writing career
- Notable work: Texaco
- Notable awards: Prix Goncourt; Prince Claus Award
- Literary movement: créolité

Patrick Chamoiseau (French pronunciation: [patʁik ʃamwazo]; born 3 December 1953) is a French author from Martinique known for his work in the créolité movement. His work spans a variety of forms and genres, including novels, essays, children's books, screenplays, theatre and comics. His novel Texaco was awarded the Prix Goncourt in 1992.

== Biography ==
Chamoiseau was born on 3 December 1953 in Fort-de-France, Martinique, where he resides. After he studied law in Paris, France, he returned to Martinique, inspired by Édouard Glissant to take a close interest in Creole culture.

In 1981, Chamoiseau was the co-author, with Georges Puisy, of a historical work on the Antilles under the reign of Napoléon Bonaparte, Delgrès : les Antilles sous Bonaparte. In 1989, he was the co-author of Éloge de la créolité (In Praise of Creoleness) with Jean Bernabé and Raphaël Confiant.

Chamoiseau has received several awards. In 1990, he received the Prix Carbet for Antan d'enfance, the first book in an autobiographical trilogy collectively titled Une enfance créole. His 1992 novel Texaco has been described as "a masterpiece, the work of a genius, a novel that deserves to be known as much as Fanon's The Wretched of the Earth and Césaire's Return to My Native Land." In 1999, Chamoiseau was honoured with a Prince Claus Award for his contribution to Caribbean society.

Chamoiseau's writing style has sometimes been compared to that of Louis-Ferdinand Céline, for how they explore the relationship between the written and the oral.

== Writing style and approach ==
=== Masculinity versus femininity ===
The dynamics and relationship between men and women have been a long-time subject of literature in the Caribbean. The concept of "masculinity" versus "femininity" is a literary theme indicative of Caribbean literature. Patrick Chamoiseau, like many other authors from the Caribbean, uses this theme in many of his literary works. However, as there are a larger number of male writers that come out of the Caribbean, this topic of conversation is primarily male driven and takes the "masculinist" perspective.

Chamoiseau has often been criticized as a somewhat patriarchal literary figure after having founded the masculinist Créolité movement in the Antilles archipelago. The founding of this movement was intended to bring pride and nationalism to the male Antillean population that had been emasculated for centuries by being barred from holding positions of power and authority by their European colonizers.

However, his literary work in the children's story "Kosto et ses deux enfants" (from Émerveilles) is in stark contrast to his typical patriarchal and masculine nature. The representation of men in Caribbean literature is typically portrayed in a negative light; in the story, this theme is contrasted by the main male character becoming an upstanding and respectable father figure.

=== Créolité ===
A question that many writers from the Caribbean try to answer is: "What does it mean to be Caribbean?" This question is the subject of a search for identity, and the word that Chamoiseau and his colleagues used to answer this question is "Creoleness". Creoleness refers to how different cultures adapt and blend on islands or isolated areas, which in the case of the Caribbean, refers to the blending of African, Polynesian, and Asian cultures with that of their European colonizers. This idea of Creoleness contrasts the idea of "Americanness" in that it existed prior to America, and that "Americanness" excludes it interaction with the indigenous population.

This relates to Patrick Chamoiseau's writing style in that his choices are purposeful as his overall goal is to express this concept of Creoleness. Creole Folktales is a prime example from his works. The collection itself takes place around the 17th century in the French Antilles and Chamoiseau casts storyteller-narrator and uses creole in order to recreate the tradition of storytelling in the Antilles that was primarily oral. Chamoiseau chooses these aspects to add to his writings as oral and historical accuracy are important in the representation of the Antilles and are crucial in bring awareness to Creoleness.

== Bibliography ==
=== Novels ===
- Chronique des sept misères (1986). Chronicle of the Seven Sorrows, trans. Linda Coverdale (University of Nebraska Press, 1999).
- Solibo magnifique (1988). Solibo Magnificent, trans. Rose-Myriam Réjouis and Val Vinokurov (Pantheon, 1998; Granta, 1999).
- Texaco (1992). Translated by Rose-Myriam Réjouis and Val Vinokurov (Pantheon/Granta, 1997).
- L'Esclave vieil homme et le Molosse (1997). US title: Slave Old Man (The New Press, 2018) / UK title: The Old Slave and the Mastiff (Dialogue Books, 2018), trans. Linda Coverdale.
- Biblique des derniers gestes (2002).
- Un dimanche au cachot (2008).
- Les Neuf consciences du malfini (2009).
- L'Empreinte à Crusoé (2012). Crusoe’s Footprint, trans. Jeffrey Landon Allen and Charly Verstraet (University of Virginia Press, 2022).
- Hypérion victimaire : Martiniquais épouvantable (2013). Republished as J'ai toujours aimé la nuit (2017).
- Le Conteur, la Nuit et le Panier (2021)
- Le Vent du nord dans les fougères glacées (2022)

=== Autobiography ===
- Antan d'enfance (1990). Childhood, trans. Carol Volk (University of Nebraska Press/Granta, 1999).
- Chemin d'école (1994). School Days, trans. Linda Coverdale (University of Nebraska Press, 1997; Granta, 1998).
- À bout d'enfance (2005).
- La matière de l'absence (2016). The Matter of Absence, trans. Carrie Jaurès Noland (Liverpool University Press, 2025).

=== Essays ===
- Éloge de la créolité (1989). With Jean Bernabé et Raphaël Confiant.
- Martinique (1989). Photographs by Michel Renaudeau and Emmanuel Valentin.
- Lettres créoles : tracées antillaises et continentales de la littérature : Haiti, Guadeloupe, Martinique, Guyane : 1635-1975 (1991). With Raphaël Confiant
- Guyane : traces-mémoires du bagne (1994). Photographs by Rodolphe Hammadi.
- Ecrire en pays dominé (1997).
- Frères migrants (2017). Migrant Brothers, trans. Matthew Amos and Fredrik Rönnbäck (Yale University Press, 2018).
- Manifestes, with Édouard Glissant (2021). Manifestos, trans. Betsy Wing and Matt Reeck (Goldsmiths Press, 2022).
- Baudelaire Jazz (2022).
- Faire-Pays - Éloge de la responsabilisation (2023).

=== Other ===
- Manman Dlo contre la fée Carabosse (1982).
- Au temps de l'antan : contes du pays Martinique (1989). US title: Creole Folktales (The New Press, 1994) / UK title: Strange Words (Granta, 1998), trans. Linda Coverdale.
- Elmire des sept bonheurs (1998). Seven Dreams of Elmira, trans. Mark Polizzotti (Zoland Books, 1999). Photographs by Jean-Luc de Laguarigue.
- Le Papillon et la Lumière (2011). Illustrated by Ianna Andreadis.
- Veilles et Merveilles Créoles (2013).
- Osons l'hospitalité, with Michel Le Bris (2022).

=== Screenplays ===
- L'Exil du roi Behanzin (1994). Directed by Guy Deslauriers.
- Le Passage du Milieu (2000). Directed by Guy Deslauriers.
- Biguine (2004). Directed by Guy Deslauriers.
- Nord Plage (2004). Directed by José Hayot.
- Aliker (2009). Directed by Guy Deslauriers.

=== Comics ===
- "Monsieur Coutcha" by Tony Delsham. Monthly comic that started in 1972, illustrated by Chamoiseau under the pseudonym "Abel". Compiled and published as Le retour de Monsieur Coutcha (1984).
- Delgrès : les Antilles sous Bonaparte (1981). Illustrated by Georges Puisy.
- Encyclomerveille d'un tueur #1 : L'orphelin de Cocoyer Grands-Boi (2009). Illustrated by Thierry Ségur.

=== Children's literature ===
- Émerveilles (1998).

== Honors and awards ==
- 1986: Prix Kléber Haedens, for Chronique des sept misères
- 1986: Prix de l'île Maurice, for Chronique des sept misères
- 1987: Prix international francophone Loys Masson, for Chronique des sept misères
- 1988: Grand Prix de la littérature de jeunesse, for Au temps de l’antan
- 1989: "Mention" Premio Grafico Fiera di Bologna per la Gioventù de la Foire du livre de jeunesse de Bologne (Italie) for Au temps de l'antan : contes du pays Martinique
- 1990: Prix Carbet de la Caraïbe, for Antan d'enfance
- 1992: Prix Goncourt for Texaco
- 1999: Prince Claus Award
- 2002: Prix Spécial du Jury RFO, for Biblique des derniers gestes
- 2008: Prix du Livre RFO, for Un dimanche au cachot
- 2010: Commandeur des Arts et des Lettres
- 2016: Prix international Nessim Habif, Académie royale de langue et de littérature françaises de Belgique, for La Matière de l'absence
- 2019: Best Translated Book Award (Slave Old Man)
- 2023: Prix Marguerite-Yourcenar

== See also ==
- Caribbean literature
- Postcolonial literature
