= Marie-Magdeleine Carbet =

Afro-Martiniquais writer (1902–1996)

- Born: Louise Eugénie Anna Marie-Magdeleine; 25 August 1902; Ducos, Martinique
- Died: 10 January 1996 (aged 93); Fort-de-France, Martinique

Marie-Magdeleine Carbet, the pen name Anna Marie-Magdeleine (25 August 1902 – 10 January 1996), was an Afro-Martiniquais writer and educator. She and her lesbian partner co-wrote poems, stories and songs under the joint pseudonym Carbet, which left them free to explore sensitive topics, usually forbidden to women. She won several literary prizes from French cultural organizations.

== Early life ==
Louise Eugénie Anna Marie-Magdeleine, who went by Anna, was born on 25 August 1902, in Ducos on the island of Martinique to Inès (called Aya) and Eugène Marie-Magdeleine. At the time, the island was a French colony and her father was born within the first decade after slavery was abolished. His family surname had been Constantin and throughout his life he and his wife were referred to as Mssr. and Mme. Constantin colloquially, though officially, after his marriage, his surname was Marie-Magdeleine. After finishing her primary schooling in her home village, Marie-Magdeleine attended school in Fort-de-France on scholarship, earning her secondary school diplomas at the age of seventeen.

In 1923, Marie-Magdeleine left for Paris to continue her education. Primarily, she studied for the next four years at the University of Paris to earn her teaching credentials for vocational education (French: Certificat d'Aptitudes Professionnelles), which included courses in domestic science, dressmaking and handicrafts, but she also took courses in art at the School of Fine Arts, journalism, and law. Completing her studies in 1928, she returned to Martinique and taught in the Fort-de-France Girls' Secondary School (French: Lycée de Jeunes Filles) until 1935. Soon after her return to Martinique, Marie-Magdeleine began a twenty-five year relationship with a divorcée, variously reported as Olympe Claude or Claude Tricot. The women adopted the surname Carbet and openly lived together as a lesbian couple and family with Claude's son, Peter. The pseudonym Carbet, was taken from the name of the Le Carbet district of Martinique and was a tangible representation of their identification with their homeland. Claude was a fellow teacher, and the two co-wrote poems, stories, and songs under their shared surname. The adoption of the pseudonym allowed Carbet to write about issues usually forbidden to women and discuss issues, such as marginalization, race and sexuality.

In 1935, Carbet returned to France to teach. While there, she participated in a variety of cultural activities: publishing articles, critiques and essays, in such journals as Droit et Liberté, associated with MRAP; broadcasting a performance over Radio France from the Eiffel Tower; participating in clubs; and establishing the first black Caribbean theatre in Paris in 1937 with Claude. In 1938, they staged a play, Dans sa case which they co-wrote, at the Salle Jean Goujon, which was one of the first productions solely created and produced by blacks in Paris. Ironically, though Paulette Nardal was Carbet's sister-in-law, there is no evidence that Carbet participated in the Négritude movement associated with Nardal in the 1930s. In 1939, she was chosen by Georges Mandel of the French Overseas ministry to collect folklore in Martinique. Soon after she left France, the Germans invaded, the country surrendered, and Philippe Pétain was appointed Prime Minister of France. Mandel's vocal opposition of the Nazi regime resulted in his arrest and because Carbet had been appointed by Mandel, she was barred from returning to France and her folklore mission was cancelled. She returned to the Girls' Secondary School to teach, but was removed from that post in 1940 by government representatives.

In 1941, Carbet opened a private school, teaching English and dressmaking and providing tutoring, on Lamartine Street in Fort-de-France. After four years, she closed the school and with Claude, opened a book store, Cité du Livre, on Schoelcher Street, which they operated until 1957, when their relationship dissolved. In 1957, Carbet returned alone to France, and began her most productive literary period over the next decade. Between 1957 and 1970, she served on the editorial board and national council of the Movement against Racism and for Friendship among People (French: Mouvement contre le racisme et pour l'amitié des peuples (MRAP)) and produced newspaper articles and six volumes of poetry. She continued with radio broadcasting, as well as speaking at lectures and conferences, to promote the culture of the French Antilles. After 1970, Carbet switched her literary activity toward Canada, publishing with Leméac in Montreal and participating with the Association of Catholic Writers through 1984. In 1988, Carbet returned to Fort-de-France and lived with her sister Mathilde.

== Death and legacy ==
Carbet died on 10 January 1996 in Fort-de-France. She was awarded the Literary Prize for the Caribbean in 1970 for Rose de ta grâce and the ADELF Critical Prize in 1975. Both awards were given by the Association of French-Speaking Writers (French: Association des écrivains de langue française (ADELF)). Carbet was awarded the Grand Prix Humanitaire de France for service to arts and letters for her overall body of work.

== Selected works ==
- Féfé et Doudo, stories (1936) with Claude Carbet
- Point d'Orgue, poetry (1958)
- Écoute, soleil-dieu, poetry (1961)
- Viens voir ma ville, poetry (1963)
- Rose de ta grace, poetry (1970), received the Prix littéraire des Caraïbes from the Association des écrivains de langue française
- Au péril de ta joie, novel (1972)
- D'une rive à l'autre, novel (1975)
- Mini-poèmes sur trois méridiens, poetry (1977)
- Au sommet, la sérénité, novel (1980)

== See also ==
- Caribbean literature
- Caribbean poetry
