= Frank B. Wilderson III =

American playwright and film critic (born 1956)

- Born: April 11, 1956 (age 70); New Orleans, Louisiana, U.S.
- Education: Dartmouth College (BA); Columbia University (MFA); University of California, Berkeley (PhD)
- Writing career
- Genres: Fiction, critical race studies, philosophy, poetry
- Notable awards: American Book Award (2008); Hurston/Wright Legacy Award (2009)

Frank Benjamin Wilderson III (born April 11, 1956) is an American writer, dramatist, filmmaker and critic. He is a professor of African American studies at the University of California, Irvine. He received his BA in government and philosophy from Dartmouth College, his Master of Fine Arts from Columbia University, and his PhD in rhetoric and film studies from the University of California, Berkeley.

== Early life ==
Wilderson was born in New Orleans, and grew up in a Catholic family in Ann Arbor, Michigan, and Minneapolis, Minnesota, during the civil rights movement. His father was a university professor. In middle school in Chicago, where his family lived when his father was on sabbatical, he organized a civil disobedience campaign to make the Pledge of Allegiance non-mandatory at his school.

When Wilderson's family moved to Berkeley, California he joined the protests there. Student activists and intellectuals were regulars in his parents' home throughout his early life, and his family was supportive of the Black Panthers. He went to Marshall-University High School in Minneapolis.

== Education ==
Wilderson began his undergraduate education in philosophy and government at Dartmouth College in 1974. Wilderson's sister Fawn Wilderson-Legos also attended the school. He continued to organize protests and engage in civil disobedience while in university and was suspended for two years after being arrested in relation to a protest against the poor conditions of immigrant construction workers there. While suspended, Wilderson worked as a laborer, freelance writer, and waste collector, hitchhiking around the U.S.

Back at Dartmouth, he participated in the Afro-American Society and was president of the Black Student Union. Wilderson also played football for the first two seasons he was there, in the position of outside linebacker.

After graduating in 1978, he worked for several years as a stockbroker in Minneapolis until returning to school to get an MFA in creative writing at Columbia University.

He moved to South Africa in 1989, where he lived for five years, teaching at University of the Witwatersrand, Vista University, and Khanya College. There, he was one of two Americans elected to the African National Congress in the early 1990s, and was a member of its armed wing UMkhonto weSizwe.

Wilderson received a Ph.D. in rhetoric and film studies at the University of California, Berkeley, in 2004. At Berkeley, he helped organized a protest against the trial of members of the Third World Liberation Front. Wilderson was arrested and charged for felonies related to his actions in the protest.

== Career ==
=== Writing ===
Wilderson has been described as one of the first writers in the tradition of Afro-pessimism.

In "Grammar and Ghosts: The Performative Limits of African Freedom", Wilderson asserts that the violent emergence of the nation originates in slavery. This violence leads to nationalities that are "shaped and comprised by slavery." The African diaspora shares a violent history that configures the African identity and thus fails to cohere in a national identity at all.

Wilderson's writing has appeared in Social Identities, Social Justice, Les Temps modernes, Konch Magazine, Obsidian II, and Paris Transcontinental.

His political memoir Incognegro: a Memoir of Exile and Apartheid chronicles his time in Johannesburg when he participated in the African National Congress and worked as a university professor. Incognegro won the 2008 American Book Award, and the Hurston/Wright Legacy Award for Nonfiction.

His book Afropessimism was longlisted for the 2020 National Book Award for Nonfiction.

=== Other work ===
Wilderson worked as a dramaturge for Lincoln Center Theater's productions of Zora Neale Hurston and Langston Hughes's Mule Bone and Mbongeni Ngema's Township Fever; and for the Johannesburg Market Theater's production of George C. Wolfe's The Colored Museum.

Wilderson III also directed the film Reparations......Now (2005).

== Awards ==
- 1988 Jerome Foundation Artist Fellowship
- 1988 Loft-McKnight Fellowship for Prose
- Judith Stronach Award for Poetry
- Crothers Short Prose Award
- Maya Angelou Award for Best Fiction Portraying the Black Experience in America
- Eisner Prize for Creative Achievement of the Highest Order, for Incognegro
- 2008 American Book Award, for Incognegro
- 2009 Hurston/Wright Legacy Award for Nonfiction, for Incognegro

== Works ==
=== Books ===
- Incognegro: From Black Power to Apartheid and Back. Beacon Press. 2007. ISBN 978-0-8070-7268-4.
- Red, White & Black: Cinema and the Structure of US Antagonisms. Duke University Press. 2010. ISBN 978-0-8223-4692-0.
- Afropessimism. Liveright. 2020. ISBN 978-1-63149-614-1.

=== Chapbooks ===
- Sideways Between Stories. Commune Editions. 2016.

=== Selected articles ===
- "Gramsci's Black Marx: Whither the Slave in Civil Society?". Social Identities. 9 (2). 2003. doi:10.1080/1350463032000101579.
- "The Prison Slave as Hegemony's (Silent) Scandal". Social Justice. 30 (2). 2003.
- "The Vengeance of Vertigo: Aphasia and Abjection in the Political Trials of Black Insurgents". InTensions (5). 2011.
- "Social Death and Narrative Aporia in 12 Years a Slave". Black Camera. 7 (1). Fall 2015.
- "The Violence of Presence: Metaphysics in a Blackened World". The Black Scholar. 43 (4). 2015. doi:10.5816/blackscholar.43.4.0117.
