= Mayotte Capécia =

Martiniquan writer (1916–1955)

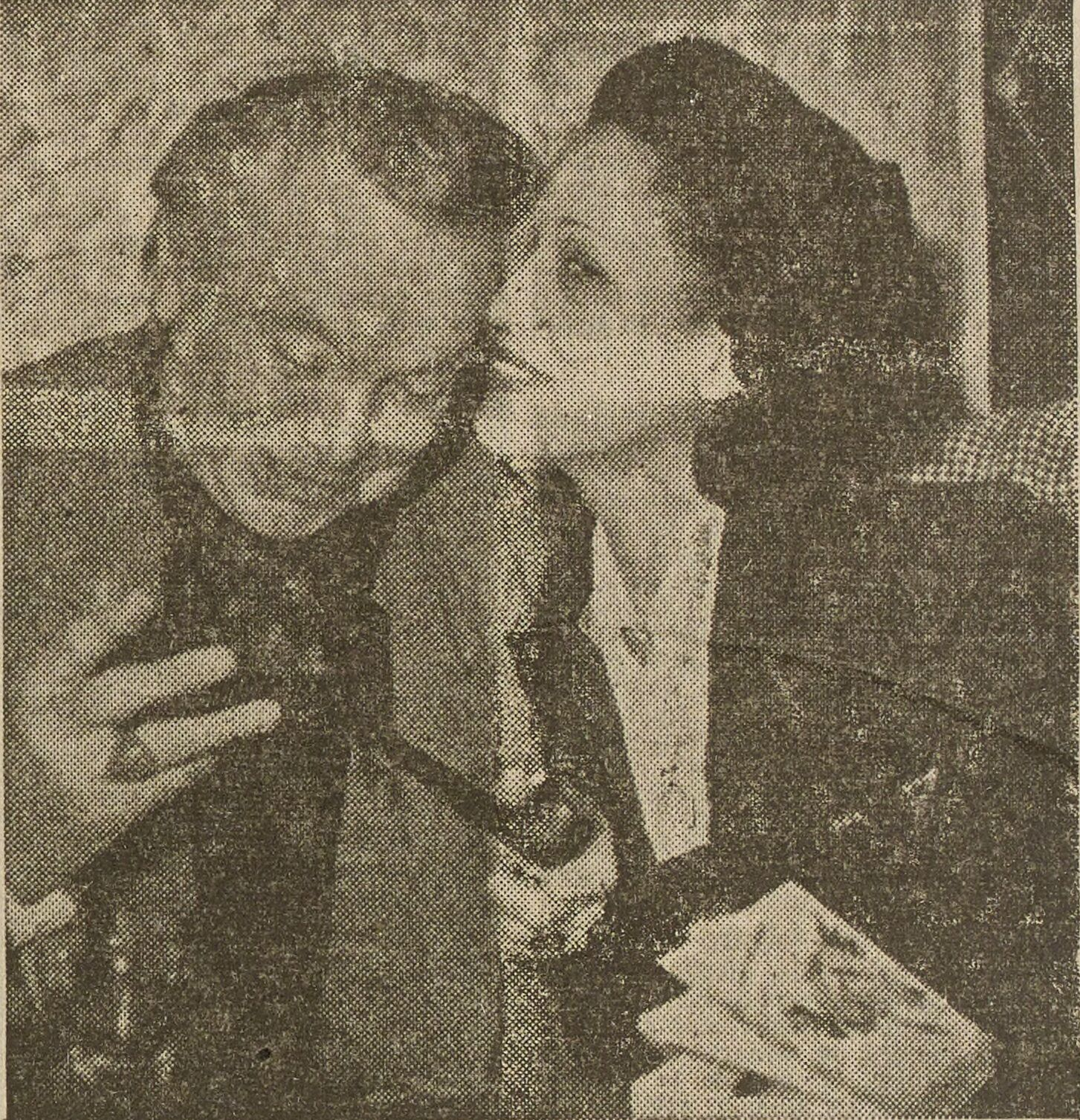
- Mayotte Capécia (right) with writer and literary critic Léo Larguier
- Born: Lucette Céranus; February 17, 1916; Le Carbet, Martinique
- Died: November 24, 1955 (aged 39); Paris, France
- Occupation: Author
- Notable work: I Am a Martinican Woman

Lucette Céranus Combette (17 February 1916 – 24 November 1955), known by her pen name Mayotte Capécia was a writer from Martinique. She is best known for her novel I Am a Martinican Woman (French: Je suis martiniquaise), published in 1948, which was the first book published in France by a woman of color.

Her work was brought to public attention primarily due to Frantz Fanon's critiques of her novels in his 1952 book Black Skin, White Masks, in which he denounced them for demonstrating self-hatred and valorizing whiteness. Later critics have reconsidered Fanon's criticism, interpretations of Combette's novels, their significance to Caribbean literature, the extent to which Combette's writing is autobiographical, and the authorship of her novels. Her writing has been reread from a feminist perspective, with Lizbeth Paravisini-Gebert considering it to be foundational in the development of Caribbean feminist literature.

== Biography ==
Lucette Céranus was one of twins born on 17 February 1916 to a single mother in Le Carbet in Martinique, then a French colony. Details of her life have been ambiguous because of the semi-autobiographical nature of I Am a Martinican Woman, whose protagonist shares her pseudonym. However, the narrative departs from her real life.

Her father, Eugène Combette had left Martinique before the birth of the twins to join the French Navy and later married one of his aunt's god-daughters in 1917. Upon hearing of the marriage, Céranus' mother, Théodosie Clémencia Émilie Céranus left Le Carbet and raised Céranus and her sister Reine until they were seven years old, when Céranus was sent to stay with one of her father's sisters in Le Carbet and Reine was entrusted to a teacher who moved between cities and villages on the coast. Unlike her sister, Céranus was able to attend school during this period, but overall, she received little education in her childhood.

A few years later, the sisters rejoined their mother in Fort-de-France until her death in late 1928 or early 1929, after which the twins returned to Le Carbet. At the age of thirteen or fourteen, they were invited to be integrated in their father's family on the condition that they take care of their half-siblings and give up education, which Céranus refused, and the two returned to Fort-de-France, where they worked at a factory. Two years later, Céranus had a relationship with the son of an elite white Béké family, after which she gave birth to a son in June 1933, at the age of seventeen.

Céranus later met a Syrian merchant who helped her establish a business, where she combined a grocery store and a laundry service. They had a daughter in January 1938 but their relationship was strained and Céranus ended the relationship in 1940 or 1941.

In Spring 1941, Céranus met a French naval officer named André, who was a supporter of the Vichy regime. They had a son together and their relationship lasted two years, until André had to return to France at the end of Admiral Robert's administration in the Antilles. He documented their love story and sent Céranus his memoir by mail, which was later incorporated into the second half of I Am a Martinican Woman.

Céranus' father only officially acknowledged the twins shortly before his death in 1946, and Céranus took on his surname, becoming "Lucette Céranus Combette".

In 1946, Combette moved to Paris because of financial difficulties and alienation. She continued to struggle financially and worked as a cook and a seamstress. Reine joined her in Paris the following year, and her children joined them in 1948. Despite having a weak command of written language at the time, she published her first novel, I Am a Martinican Woman in 1948, which won the Prix des Antilles in 1949. Her second novel, The White Negress was released in 1950. Both works are inspired heavily by her own life.

Combette died of cancer on 24 November 1955 in Paris.

== I Am a Martinican Woman and The White Negress ==
Combette published two novels, I Am a Martinican Woman (1948) and The White Negress (1950). I Am a Martinican Woman is written in first person and presented as the autobiography of Mayotte Capécia, while The White Negress is written in third person about a woman named Isaure. Both books feature fair-skinned, mixed-race Martinican women as protagonists and handle themes of racial identity, interracial relationships and alienation.

In I Am a Martinican Woman, the first part of the novel follows the childhood of Mayotte Capécia, a mixed-race girl growing up in Le Carbet. The second part is set during World War II, with Admiral Robert in control of Martinique, and focuses on the story of the relationship between Mayotte and André, a white French officer. Over the course of the novel, Mayotte increasingly internalizes racist ideology and seeks to associate herself with whiteness.

The White Negress similarly follows a fair-skinned, mixed race woman who idealizes whiteness and seeks relationships with white men to gain proximity to whiteness. Unlike Mayotte, the protagonist, Isaure begins to grow to accept her blackness. This novel takes place entirely during Admiral Robert's regime and tackles the war more directly than the previous book.

=== Authorship ===
At the time that I Am a Martinican Woman was published, Combette was barely literate and the book was written with the help of ghostwriters. The book was advertised as an autobiography, in which "for the first time, a woman of colour tells her life story." However, it is neither completely faithful to Combette's life, nor written by a single woman named Mayotte Capécia. The second part of the novel is largely adapted from the memoir written by André, the French naval officer, with some passages almost totally reproduced. Christiane Makward analyzed archives of Combette's letters and notes, concluding that upon arriving in Paris, Combette was practically illiterate, but that she studied reading and writing after receiving the opportunity to publish her writing. Makward suggests that her first novel was written with major contributions from editors at the Côrrea publishing house, which published her books. The style of Combette's second novel differs significantly from the first, which may indicate improvement in Combette's writing, or a different approach in the collaboration between her and her co-writers at the publishing house.

The discovery of the shared and uncertain authorship of these novels has led some, such as Albert James Arnold to accuse the publication of Mayotte Capécia's novels of being a hoax by Combette and Edmond Buchet, the Publishing Director of Côrrea. Arnold also considers the use of André's memoir to be plagiarism.

Mayotte Capécia was accepted as the true identity of the author until 1995, when Beatrice Stith Clark, who translated the novels into English, discovered the real identity of the author to be Lucette Céranus Combette. Christiane Makward's 1999 book, Mayotte Capécia ou l'Alienation selon Fanon reveals the details of Combette's life, obtained from Combette's son, Claude and her sister, Reine.

=== Fanon's critique ===
In Black Skin, White Masks, Fanon attacks Combette's writing for embodying self-hatred and 'lactification', or the internalisation of feelings of inferiority and the aspiration towards whiteness among black people. He accuses Mayotte of betraying her blackness by pursuing white men and having children with them.

However, Fanon's critique has been criticized as being sexist and commodifying women by treating them as instrumental in the dynamic between black and white men, and as mere objects of desire. Fanon also overlooks the question of authorship and the extent to which the work is autobiographical, treating it as a true account of a real Mayotte Capécia.

=== Other interpretations and reception ===
The initial reception towards I Am a Martinican Woman was mixed. The literary critic René Étiemble denounced the novel, whose primary love interest is an officer who served in the Vichy regime, for idealizing a man who held racist ideas and supported the head of the regime, Philippe Pétain.

On the other hand, other readers celebrated the novel for providing a new perspective and for its description of the Antilles. It earned Combette some success among literary circles and she met several famous figures in the art and literary worlds, including Josephine Baker, Katherine Dunham, Léon Damas, Richard Wright and Henry Miller. I Am a Martinican Woman was translated into German and Swedish soon after its release and it won the Prix des Antilles in 1949.

However, few critics other than Fanon wrote about Combette's work until the late twentieth century, when feminist scholars began to reconsider Fanon's reading, viewing it as sexist and reductive. Paulette Richards, Christiane Makward, Myriam Cottias and Madeleine Dobie, among others have studied Combette's writing from a new perspective, considering the previously hidden biographical context and the historical context of the society in which Combette lived.
