= Créolité =

Literary movement first developed in the 1980s

Créolité (French pronunciation: [kʁeɔlite]) is a literary movement first developed in the 1980s by the Martinican writers Patrick Chamoiseau, Jean Bernabé and Raphaël Confiant. They published Eloge de la créolité (In Praise of Creoleness) in 1989 as a response to the perceived inadequacies of the négritude movement. Créolité, or "creoleness", is a neologism which attempts to describe the cultural and linguistic heterogeneity of places like the Antilles and, more specifically, of the French Caribbean.

"Creoleness" may also refer to the scientifically meaningful characteristics of Creole languages, the subject of study in creolistics.

== History ==
Créolité can perhaps best be described in contrast with the movement that preceded it, la négritude, a literary movement spearheaded by Aimé Césaire, Léopold Sédar Senghor and Léon Damas in the 1930s. Négritude writers sought to define themselves in terms of their cultural, racial and historical ties to the African continent as a rejection of French colonial political hegemony and of French cultural, intellectual, racial and moral domination. Césaire and his contemporaries considered the shared black heritage of members of the African diaspora as a source of power and self-worth for those oppressed by the physical and psychological violence of the colonial project. In the words of Lewis, it is a "transitory" movement, "agent of revolutionary change" stimulated by a desire to express a Black singularity and a Black unity.

Later writers such as the Martinican Edouard Glissant came to reject the monolithic view of "blackness" portrayed in the négritude movement. Indeed, an initial naming of this movement following négritude as créolitude in 1977 gave way to créolité, with a change in suffix indicating a "strong semantic contrast." Backdropping créolité, in the early 1960s, Glissant advanced the concept of Antillanité ("Caribbeanness"), which claimed that Caribbean identity could not be described solely in terms of African descent. Caribbean identity came not only from the heritage of ex-slaves, but was equally influenced by indigenous Caribbeans, European colonialists, East Indian and Chinese (indentured servants). Glissant and adherents to the subsequent créolité movement (called créolistes) likewise stress the unique historical and cultural roots of Creole regions while still rejecting imperialist (especially French) dominance in these areas. Glissant points out that the slaves that were brought there and their descendants are no longer merely African "migrants", but became "new beings in a different space", part of a new identity born from a mixing of cultures and differences.

The authors of Eloge de la créolité describe créolité as "an annihilation of false universality, of monolinguism, and of purity." (La créolité est une annihilation de la fausse universalité, du monolinguisme et de la pureté). In particular, the créolité movement seeks to reverse the dominance of French as the language of culture and literature in French-based Creole areas. Instead it valorizes the use of Creole languages in literary, cultural and academic contexts. Indeed, many of the créolistes publish their novels in both Creole and French. They advocate a heterogeneous identity and proudly bear their differences and are "neither Europeans, nor Africans, nor Asians, we proclaim ourselves Créoles". (ni Européens, ni Africains, ni Asiatiques, nous nous proclamons créoles).

== Bibliography ==
- Bernabé, Jean, Patrick Chamoiseau & Raphaël Confiant (1989), Éloge de la créolité, Paris: Gallimard. p. 28.
- Ormerod, Beverley (1998), "The Martinican concept of "creoleness": A multiracial redefinition of culture", Mots Pluriels, 7, archived from the original on 2006-09-28.
- Wittmann, Henri (1999). "Prototype as a typological yardstick to creoleness." The Creolist Archives Papers On-line, Stockholms Universitet.

== See also ==
- Creole peoples
- Creolization
- Négritude
- Postcolonial literature
- Suzanne Césaire
