= Le Lorrain =

- Commune
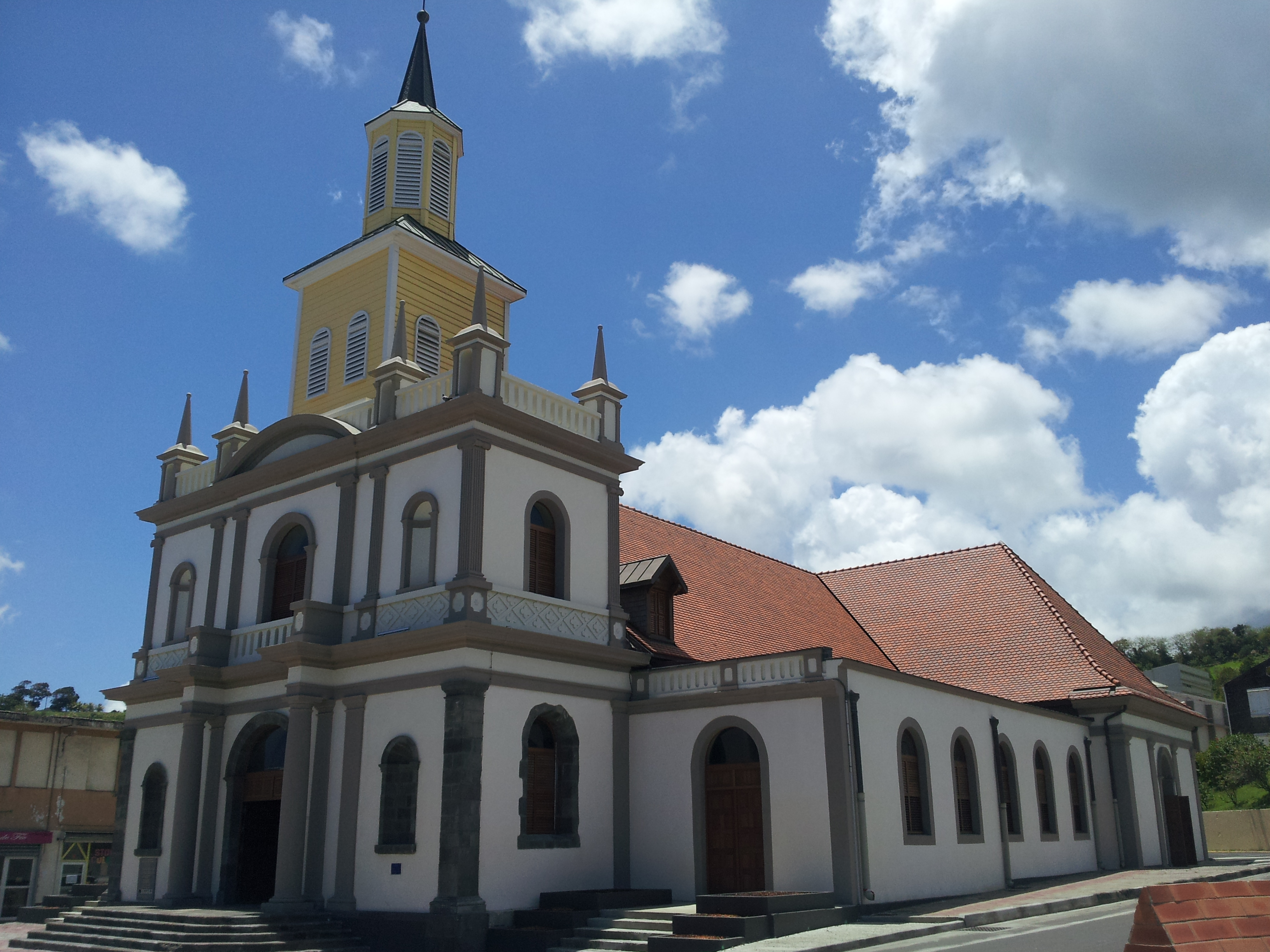
- The church of Saint-Hyacinthe of Lorrain

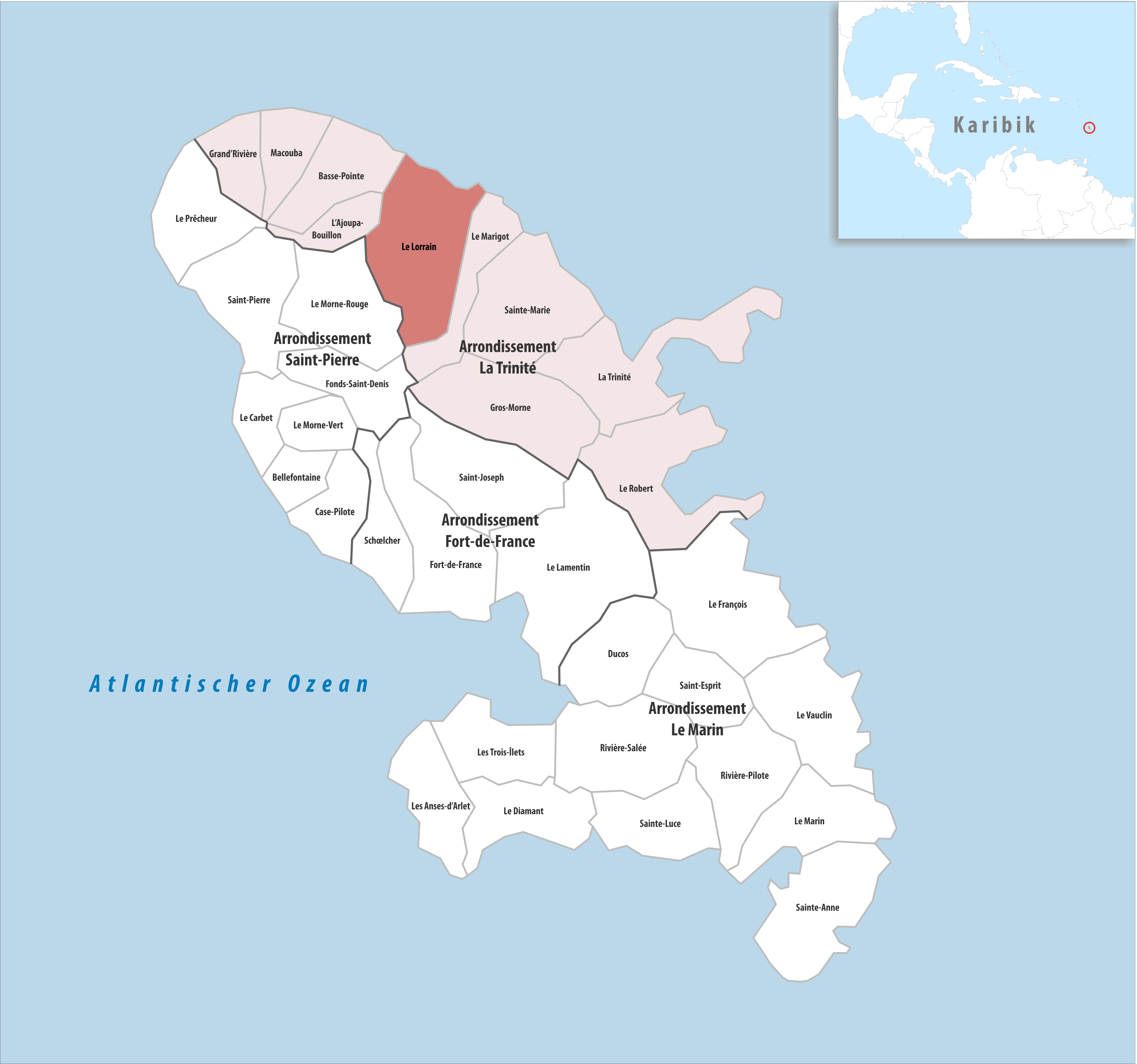
- Location of the commune (in red) within Martinique
- Location of Le Lorrain
- Location within France
- Coordinates: 14°50′N 61°04′W
- Country: France
- Overseas region and department: Martinique
- Arrondissement: La Trinité
- Intercommunality: CA Pays Nord Martinique

Government
  - Mayor (2020–2026): Justin Pamphile
- Area^{1}: 50.33 km^{2} (19.43 sq mi)
- Highest elevation: 885 m (2,904 ft)
- Lowest elevation: 0 m (0 ft)
- Population (2023): 6,566
  - Density: 130.5/km^{2} (337.9/sq mi)
- Time zone: UTC−04:00 (AST)
- INSEE/Postal code: 97214 /97214
- ^{1} French Land Register data, which excludes lakes, ponds, glaciers > 1 km^{2} (0.386 sq mi or 247 acres) and river estuaries.

Le Lorrain (French pronunciation: [lə lɔʁɛ̃]; Martinican Creole: Loren) is a town and commune in the French overseas region and department of Martinique. It was originally called Grande-Anse and was renamed as such in the late 19th century. The economy is dominated by agriculture, mainly sugercane and bananas. It is nicknamed "banana kingdom".

== History ==
Le Lorrain was originally called Grande-Anse after a local river, and was renamed as such in the late 19th century. The region was inhabited by Arawak people in the first century CE, and Caribs later, who were driven out by the French in 1658 after France took control of Martinique in 1635. In the last part of the 17th century, a church and parish was established. The French developed it into an agricultural center and crops like tobacco, sugarcane, and coffee were grown using the local population as slaves.

By the 18th century, several plantations developed in the region. While slavery was initially abolished in 1792, it was restored in the early 19th century. In 1833, a revolt by the local people resulted in several deaths, and the parish became the commune of Le Lorrain in 1840. While slavery was officially abolished in 1848, agriculture continued in the region, largely supported by Indian laborers. The town avoided damage from the eruption of Mount Pelée in 1902, and the rum industry developed in the early 20th century. The commune faced severe shortages during the Second World War.

== Geography ==
Le Lorrain is a town and commune in the Arrondissement of La Trinité in the French overseas region and department of Martinique. It is located along Martinique's North Atlantic coast, and forms part of the intercommunality of Pays Nord Martinique. It covers an area of 50.3 km^{2} (19.4 sq mi), and is the fourth largest commune in the department.

== Demographics and economy ==
As per the 2023 census, Le Lorrain had a population of 6,566 individuals.

Historical population
Year	Pop.	±% p.a.
1967	9,172	—
1974	8,611	−0.90%
1982	7,929	−1.03%
1990	8,084	+0.24%
1999	8,234	+0.20%
2007	7,716	−0.81%
2012	7,294	−1.12%
2017	6,878	−1.17%
2023	6,566	−0.77%
Source: INSEE

The economy of Le Lorrain is dependent on agriculture, and it is nicknamed "banana kingdom" for it banana cultivation.

== See also ==
- Communes of the Martinique department
