= Frantz Fanon =

French psychiatrist and philosopher (1925-1961)

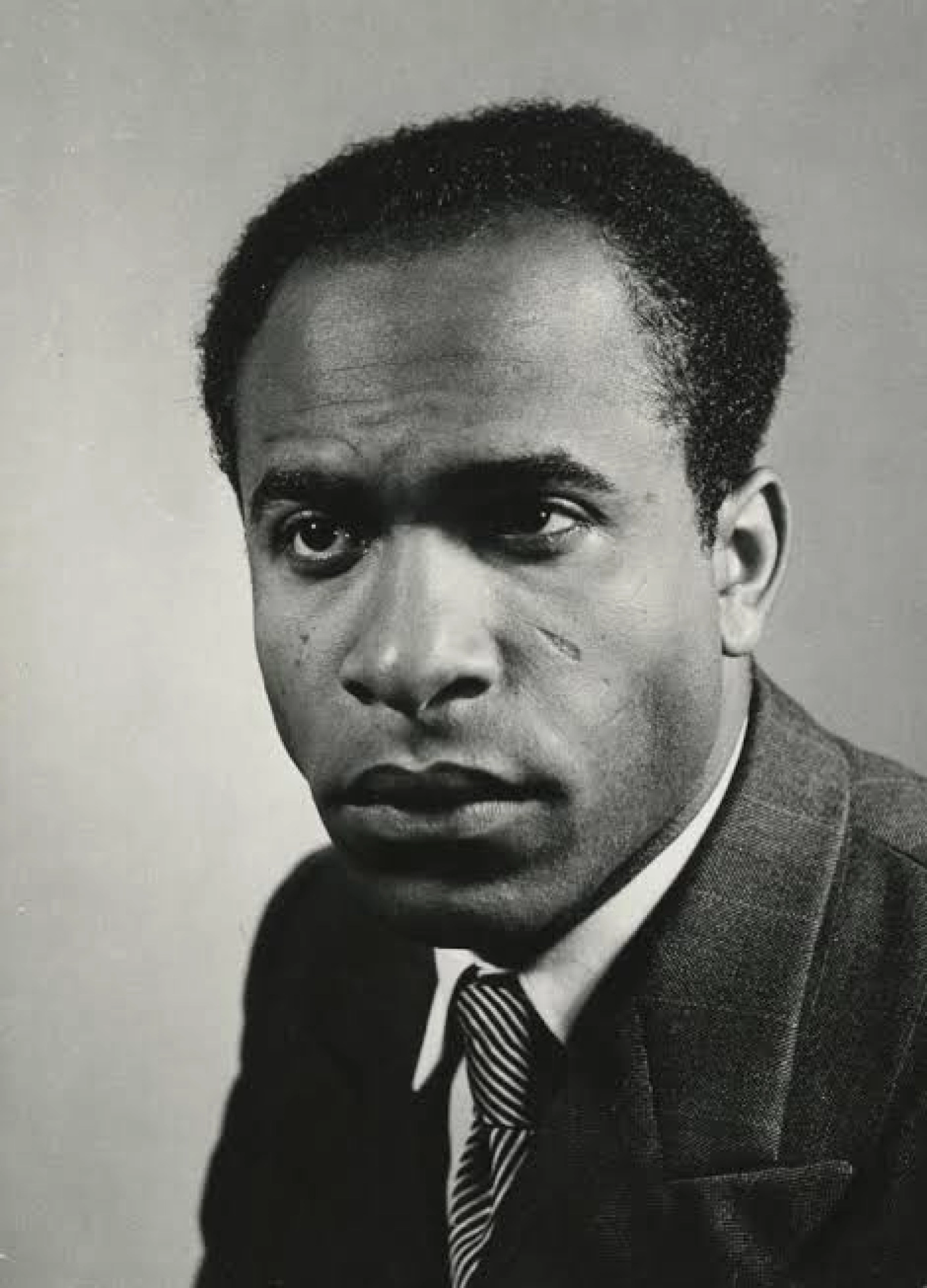
- Born: Frantz Omar Fanon; 20 July 1925; Fort-de-France, Martinique, France
- Died: 6 December 1961 (aged 36); Bethesda, Maryland, U.S.
- Resting place: Martyrs' Cemetery; Aïn Kerma, Algeria
- Citizenship: France
- Spouse: Josie Dublé Fanon (m. 1952)
- Partner: Michèle Weyer (1948)
- Children: 2, including Mireille

Education
- Education: University of Lyon (MD, 1951)

Philosophical work
- Era: Contemporary philosophy
- Region: Africana philosophy
- School: Black existentialism Critical theory Existential phenomenology
- Main interests: Decolonization, postcolonialism, revolution, psychopathology of colonization, racism, psychoanalysis
- Notable works: Black Skin, White Masks (1952); The Wretched of the Earth (1961)
- Notable ideas: Double consciousness, colonial alienation, to become black, sociogeny, total liberation, by any means necessary

Frantz Omar Fanon (/ˈfænən/, US: /fæˈnɒ̃/; French: [fʁɑ̃ts fanɔ̃]; 20 July 1925 – 6 December 1961) was a French psychiatrist and political philosopher from Martinique, who made critical contributions to the fields of post-colonial studies and critical theory. As well as an intellectual, Fanon was a political radical and Pan-Africanist, concerned with the psychopathology of colonization and the human, social, and cultural consequences of decolonization.

In the course of his work as a physician and psychiatrist, Fanon supported the Algerian War of independence (1954–1962) from France and joined the Algerian National Liberation Front. Jansen and Osterhammel characterise Fanon as "the most influential anticolonial thinker of his time". For more than five decades, the life and works of Fanon have inspired national liberation movements and other freedom and political movements in Sri Lanka, South Africa, and the United States.

Fanon formulated a model for community psychology, believing that many mental health patients would have an improved prognosis if they were integrated into their family and community instead of being treated with institutionalized care. He also helped found the field of institutional psychotherapy while working at Saint-Alban under François Tosquelles and Jean Oury.

== Life and career ==
=== Early life ===
Frantz Omar Fanon was born on 20 July 1925 in Fort-de-France, Martinique, which was then part of the French colonial empire, into a middle class family. His father, Félix Casimir Fanon, worked as a customs officer. Fanon's mother, Eléanore Médélice, who was of Afro-Caribbean and Alsatian descent, was a shopkeeper.

Fanon was the third of four sons in a family of eight children. Two of his siblings died young, including Fanon's sister Gabrielle, with whom he was very close. The young Frantz Fanon was an avid football player and played the sport in Martinique, later organizing football matches for patients and staff while working at the Blida-Joinville psychiatric hospital in Algeria.

=== World War II ===
In June 1940, the German victory in the Battle of France resulted in the French Third Republic capitulating to Nazi Germany. Martinique came under the control of French Navy elements under Admiral Georges Robert, who were loyal to the collaborationist Vichy regime in France. The war disrupted imports from Metropolitan France to Martinique, leading to major shortages on the island, while Robert's authoritarian regime repressed Martinican Allied sympathizers, hundreds of whom escaped to nearby Caribbean islands. Fanon later described the pro-Vichy regime in Martinique as taking off their masks and behaving like "authentic racists". In January 1943, he fled Martinique during the wedding of one of his brothers, and travelled to the British colony of Dominica in order to link up with other Allied sympathizers.

Robert's regime was overthrown by a local uprising in June 1943, which Fanon would later acclaim as "the birth of the [Martinican] proletariat" as a revolutionary force. Following the uprising, Fanon "enthusiastically" returned to Martinique, where the pro-Allied Free French leader Charles de Gaulle had appointed Henri Tourtet as the colony's new governor. Tourtet raised the 5th Antillean Marching Battalion to serve in Free French Forces (FFL), and Fanon quickly enlisted in the unit at Fort-de-France.

He underwent basic training before boarding a troopship bound for Morocco in March 1944. After Fanon arrived in Casablanca, he was shocked to discover the extent of racial discrimination in the FFL. Fanon was transferred to a Free French military base in Béjaïa, Algeria, where he witnessed firsthand the antisemitism and Islamophobia of the pieds-noirs, many of whom had supported racist laws promulgated by the Vichy regime.

In August 1944, Fanon embarked on another troopship at Oran to participate in Operation Dragoon, the Allied invasion of German-occupied Provence. After the American VI Corps secured a beachhead, Fanon's unit came ashore at Saint-Tropez and advanced inland. In Doubs, he participated in several engagements near Montbéliard and was seriously wounded by shrapnel, which resulted in him being hospitalized for two months. Fanon was awarded a Croix de Guerre by Colonel Raoul Salan for his military service. In early 1945, he rejoined his unit and fought in the Battle of Alsace.

After German forces had been pushed out of France and Allied troops crossed the Rhine into Germany, Fanon and his fellow black troops were removed from their formations and sent southwards to Toulon as part of de Gaulle's policy of removing non-white soldiers from the French army. Fanon was transferred to Normandy to await repatriation to the West Indies.

Although Fanon had been initially eager to participate in the Allied war effort, the racism he witnessed during the war disillusioned him. Fanon wrote to his brother Joby from Europe that "I've been deceived, and I am paying for my mistakes... I'm sick of it all." In the fall of 1945, a newly-discharged Fanon returned to Martinique, where he focused on completing his baccalauréat in philosophy at the prestigious Lycée Victor-Schœlcher in Fort-de-France. During this time, he campaigned for Aimé Césaire (one of the founders of Négritude and a teacher at the Lycée) who was running to become Martinique's deputy to the first National Assembly of the French Fourth Republic. Though Césaire never taught Fanon directly, his writings had a profound impact on Fanon's thought. Staying in Martinique long enough to finish his baccalauréat, Fanon returned to Metropolitan France in 1946 to study medicine.

=== France ===
Fanon was educated at the University of Lyon, where he also studied literature, drama, and philosophy, sometimes attending Merleau-Ponty's lectures. During this period, he wrote three plays, of which two survive. After qualifying as a psychiatrist in 1951, Fanon did a residency in psychiatry at Saint-Alban-sur-Limagnole under the radical Catalan psychiatrist François Tosquelles, who invigorated Fanon's thinking by emphasizing the role of culture in psychopathology.

In 1948, Fanon started a relationship with Michèle Weyer, a white medical student, who soon became pregnant. He left her for an 18-year-old high school student, Josie, whom he married in 1952. At his friends' urging, he later recognized his daughter, Mireille, although he had no contact with her. Paulin Joachim, who knew Fanon, said that on a number of occasions he had seen Fanon hit Josie.

In Lyon, while completing his residency, Fanon wrote and published his first book, Black Skin, White Masks (1952), an analysis of the negative psychological effects of colonial subjugation upon black people. Originally, the manuscript was a doctoral dissertation, submitted at Lyon, entitled Essay on the Disalienation of the Black, which was a response to the racism that Fanon experienced while studying psychiatry and medicine at the University in Lyon. The rejection of the dissertation prompted Fanon to publish it as a book. (Note: In 1951, for his doctor of medicine degree, he submitted another dissertation of narrower scope and a different subject: Altérations mentales, modifications caractérielles, troubles psychiques et déficit intellectuel dans l'hérédo-dégénération spino-cérébelleuse : à propos d'un cas de maladie de Friedreich avec délire de possession ("Mental alterations, character modifications, psychic disorders, and intellectual deficit in hereditary spinocerebellar degeneration: A case of Friedreich's disease with delusions of possession").)

Left-wing philosopher Francis Jeanson, leader of the pro-Algerian independence Jeanson network, read Fanon's manuscript and, as a senior book editor at Éditions du Seuil in Paris, gave the book its new title and wrote its epilogue.

After receiving Fanon's manuscript at Seuil, Jeanson invited him to an editorial meeting. Amid Jeanson's praise of the book, Fanon exclaimed: "Not bad for a nigger, is it?" Insulted, Jeanson dismissed Fanon from his office. Later, Jeanson learned that his response had earned him the writer's lifelong respect, and Fanon acceded to Jeanson's suggestion that the book be entitled Black Skin, White Masks.

In the book, Fanon described the unfair treatment of black people in France and how they were disapproved of by white people. Frantz argued that racism and dehumanization directed toward black people caused feelings of inferiority among black people. This dehumanization prevented black people from fully assimilating into white society and into full personhood. This caused psychological strife among black people, as even if they spoke French, obtained an education, and followed social customs associated with white people, they would still never be regarded as French or a Man. Instead, black people are defined as "Black Man" rather than "Man". See further discussion of Black Skin, White Masks under Work, below.

=== Algeria ===
After his residency, Fanon practiced psychiatry at Pontorson, near Mont Saint-Michel, for another year and then from 1953, in Algeria. He was chef de service at the Blida-Joinville Psychiatric Hospital in Algeria. He worked there until his deportation in January 1957.

Fanon's methods of treatment started evolving, particularly by beginning sociotherapy to connect with his patients' cultural backgrounds. He also trained nurses and interns. Following the outbreak of the Algerian revolution in November 1954, Fanon joined the Front de Libération Nationale (FLN), after having made contact with Pierre Chaulet at Blida in 1955. Working at a French hospital in Algeria, Fanon became responsible for treating the psychological distress of the French soldiers and officers who carried out torture in order to suppress anti-colonial resistance. Fanon was also responsible for treating Algerian torture victims.

Fanon made extensive trips across Algeria, mainly in the Kabylia region, to study the cultural and psychological life of Algerians. His lost study of "The marabout of Si Slimane" is an example. These trips were also a means of conducting clandestine activities, notably during his visits to the ski resort of Chrea, which hid an FLN base.

=== Joining the FLN and exile from Algeria ===
By summer 1956, Fanon realized he could no longer support French efforts, even indirectly, through his hospital work. In November, he submitted his "Letter of Resignation to the Resident Minister", which later became an influential text of its own in anti-colonialist circles.

There comes a time when silence becomes dishonesty. The ruling intentions of personal existence are not in accord with the permanent assaults on the most commonplace values. For many months, my conscience has been the seat of unpardonable debates. And the conclusion is the determination not to despair of man, in other words, of myself. The decision I have reached is that I cannot continue to bear a responsibility at no matter what cost, on the false pretext that there is nothing else to be done.

Shortly afterwards, Fanon was expelled from Algeria and moved to Tunis, where he joined the FLN openly. He was part of the editorial collective of Al Moudjahid, for which he wrote until the end of his life. He also served as Ambassador to Ghana for the Provisional Algerian Government (GPRA). He attended conferences in Accra, Conakry, Addis Ababa, Leopoldville, Cairo and Tripoli. Many of his shorter writings from this period were collected posthumously in the book Toward the African Revolution. In this book, Fanon reveals war tactical strategies; in one chapter, he discusses how to open a southern front to the war and how to run the supply lines.

Upon his return to Tunis, after his exhausting trip across the Sahara to open a Third Front, Fanon was diagnosed with leukemia. He went to the Soviet Union for treatment and experienced remission of his illness. When he returned to Tunis once again, he dictated his testament, The Wretched of the Earth. When he was not confined to his bed, he delivered lectures to Armée de Libération Nationale (ALN) officers at Ghardimaou on the Algerian–Tunisian border. He traveled to Rome for a three-day meeting with Jean-Paul Sartre, who had greatly influenced his work. Sartre agreed to write a preface to Fanon's last book, The Wretched of the Earth.

==== 1959 assassination attempt ====
In 1959, as Fanon took on a more prominent role within the FLN, he became a target of French forces. That year, operatives of La Main Rouge (the Red Hand), an anti-FLN paramilitary group funded by French intelligence, tracked him to Rome, where he had traveled for medical treatment following a car accident in Morocco. Before an FLN operative could pick Fanon up from the airport, a bomb planted beneath the operative's vehicle detonated prematurely, killing a child nearby. Following the incident, Fanon left Rome and returned to exile in Tunis.

=== Death, burial and aftermath ===
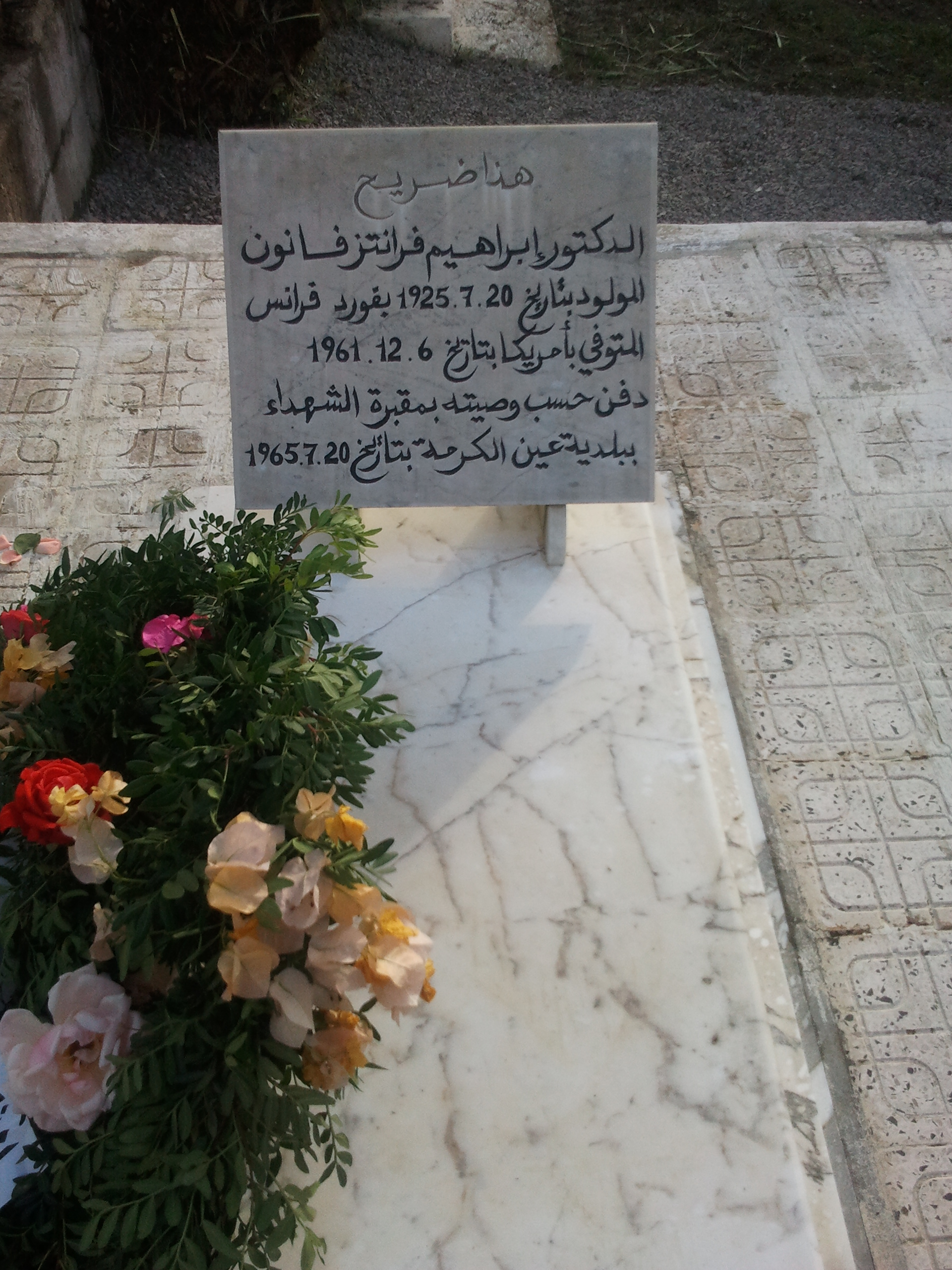
Fanon's grave in Aïn Kerma, Algeria

With his health declining, Fanon's comrades urged him to seek treatment in the U.S. as his Soviet doctors had suggested. In the fall of 1961 the CIA arranged a trip with his wife and son, and a promise of diplomatic cover, for further leukemia treatment at a National Institutes of Health facility. Fanon arrived with his family in New York City on 3 October 1961 and spent the three months left to him in Washington, D.C. and Bethesda, Maryland.

During his time in the United States, Fanon was handled by CIA agent C. Oliver Iselin III. As Lewis R. Gordon points out, the circumstances of Fanon's stay are somewhat disputed: "What has become orthodoxy, however, is that he was kept in a hotel without treatment for several days until he contracted pneumonia." This view, that the CIA hastened Fanon's death by facilitating denial of treatment, was also spread by French intellectuals such as Simone de Beauvoir and Claude Lanzmann. Iselin offered a more nuanced view of the delay, saying in 2015 that,

[a]fter Fanon’s arrival in Washington, he remained in [the Dupont Circle Hotel] for a week before being admitted to NIH. He was very disappointed at the delay, as was I, but it took that long to clear all the bureaucratic hurdles for admission. Some critics have suggested this delay was contrived so that Fanon could be “debriefed.” This was not so. Knowing Fanon’s political views and aware of his distrust of our motives, I avoided political discussion with him and concentrated on establishing rapport and making his stay at the hotel as comfortable as possible.

Iselin also claimed to have helped find an apartment for Fanon's wife Josie and admission to a private school in Washington, D.C. for his son, Olivier. As both members of Fanon's family were black, Iselin contrived a diplomatic cover to assist them in navigating the racism endemic to the city: Olivier was admitted to St. Albans preparatory school as the son of an Arab diplomat.

At 3:00 pm on 6 December 1961, Fanon died from the double pneumonia he had contracted two days earlier, at the National Institutes of Health Clinical Center in Bethesda, Maryland. He had begun leukemia treatment at NIH on 10 October but far too late. He had been admitted under the name of Ibrahim Omar Fanon, a Libyan nom de guerre he had assumed in order to enter a hospital in Rome after being wounded in Morocco during a mission for the Algerian National Liberation Front.

He was buried in Algeria after lying in state in Tunisia, where his body had been delivered by the US Air Force at the request of the FLN. Iselin happened to arrive in Tunis the day before Fanon's funeral. The FLN invited the CIA agent to attend the ceremony in Ghardimaou, where he was photographed. Later, Fanon's body was escorted across the Algerian border, where it was then carried on foot by an Algerian honor guard to a martyrs' (Chouhada) graveyard at Aïn Kerma in eastern Algeria. Isselin was again invited to the burial and followed the cortege through the desert on foot.

Frantz Fanon was survived by his wife, Josie (née Dublé), their son, Olivier Fanon, and his daughter from a previous relationship, Mireille Fanon-Mendès France. Josie Fanon later became disillusioned with the government and, after years of depression and drinking, died by suicide in Algiers in 1989. Mireille became a professor of international law and conflict resolution and serves as president of the Frantz Fanon Foundation. Olivier became president of the Frantz Fanon National Association, founded in Algiers in 2012.

== Works ==
=== Black Skin, White Masks ===
Black Skin, White Masks was first published in French as Peau noire, masques blancs in 1952 and is one of Fanon's most important works. In Black Skin, White Masks, Fanon psychoanalyzes the oppressed black person who is perceived to have to be a lesser creature in the white world that they live in, and studies how they navigate the world through a performance of whiteness. Particularly in discussing language, he talks about how the black person's use of a colonizer's language is seen by the colonizer as predatory, and not transformative, which may create insecurity in the black's consciousness. He recounts that he himself faced many admonitions as a child for using Creole French instead of "real French", or "French French", that is, "white" French. Ultimately, he concludes that "mastery of language [of the white/colonizer] for the sake of recognition as white reflects a dependency that subordinates the black's humanity".

The reception of his work has been affected by English translations which are recognized to contain numerous omissions and errors, while his unpublished work, including his doctoral thesis, has received little attention. As a result, it has been argued that Fanon has often been portrayed as an advocate of violence (it would be more accurate to characterize him as a dialectical opponent of nonviolence) and that his ideas have been extremely oversimplified. This reductionist vision of Fanon's work ignores the subtlety of his understanding of the colonial system. For example, the fifth chapter of Black Skin, White Masks translates, literally, as "The Lived Experience of the Black" ("L'expérience vécue du Noir"), but Markmann's translation is "The Fact of Blackness", which leaves out the massive influence of phenomenology on Fanon's early work.

Black Skin, White Masks has been criticized as sexist and homophobic. Among other statements, the book contains the remarks, "Just as there are faces that just ask to be slapped, couldn't we speak of women who just ask to be raped", and "when a woman lives the fantasy of rape by a black man, it is a kind of fulfillment of a personal dream or an intimate wish", and "the Negrophobic man is a repressed homosexual".

=== A Dying Colonialism ===
A Dying Colonialism is a 1959 book by Fanon that provides an account of how, during the Algerian Revolution, the people of Algeria fought their oppressors. They changed centuries-old cultural patterns and embraced certain ancient cultural practices long derided by their colonialist oppressors as "primitive," in order to destroy the oppressors. Fanon uses the fifth year of the Algerian Revolution as a point of departure for an explication of the inevitable dynamics of colonial oppression.

The militant book describes Fanon's understanding that for the colonized, “having a gun is the only chance you still have of giving a meaning to your death.” It also contains one of his most influential articles, "Unveiled Algeria", that signifies the fall of imperialism and describes how oppressed people struggle to decolonize their "mind" to avoid assimilation.

=== The Wretched of the Earth ===
In The Wretched of the Earth (1961, Les damnés de la terre), published shortly before Fanon's death, Fanon defends the right of a colonized people to use violence to gain independence. In addition, he delineated the processes and forces leading to national independence or neocolonialism during the decolonization movement that engulfed much of the world after World War II. In defence of the use of violence by colonized peoples, Fanon argued that human beings who are not considered as such (by the colonizer) shall not be bound by principles that apply to humanity in their attitude towards the colonizer. His book was censored by the French government.

For Fanon in The Wretched of the Earth, the colonizer's presence in Algeria is based on sheer military strength. Any resistance to this strength must also be of a violent nature because it is the only "language" the colonizer speaks. Thus, violent resistance is a necessity imposed by the colonists upon the colonized. The relevance of language and the reformation of discourse pervades much of his work, which is why it is so interdisciplinary, spanning psychiatric concerns to encompass politics, sociology, anthropology, linguistics and literature.

His participation in the Algerian Front de Libération Nationale from 1955 determined his audience as the Algerian colonized. It was to them that his final work, Les damnés de la terre, translated into English by Constance Farrington as The Wretched of the Earth, was directed. It constitutes a warning to the oppressed of the dangers they face in the whirlwind of decolonization and the transition to a neo-colonialist, globalized world.

== Influences ==
Fanon was influenced by a variety of thinkers, including Jean-Paul Sartre and Jacques Lacan, and the intellectual traditions of Marxism and Négritude. Aimé Césaire, a leader of the Négritude movement, was a particularly significant influence.

Césaire was a mentor to Fanon on the island of Martinique, where he was first introduced to Négritude during his lycée days on the island. Césaire coined the term and presented his ideas in Tropiques, the journal that he edited with his wife, Suzanne Césaire, in addition to in his now classic Cahier d'un retour au pays natal ("Journal of a Homecoming"). Fanon referred to Césaire's writings in his own work. For example, he quoted Césaire at length in "The Lived Experience of the Black Man", a heavily anthologized essay from Black Skins, White Masks.

== Legacy ==
Fanon has had an influence on anti-colonial and national liberation movements. In particular, Les damnés de la terre was a major influence on the work of revolutionary leaders such as Ali Shariati in Iran, Steve Biko in South Africa, Amílcar Cabral in Guinea-Bissau and Ernesto Che Guevara in Cuba. Of these, only Guevara was primarily concerned with Fanon's theories on violence; for Shariati and Biko the main interest in Fanon was "the new man" and "black consciousness" respectively.

For the American liberation struggle known as the Black Power movement, Fanon's work was especially influential. His book Wretched of the Earth is quoted directly in the preface of Stokely Carmichael (Kwame Ture) and Charles Hamilton's book, Black Power: The Politics of Liberation which was published in 1967, shortly after Carmichael left the Student Nonviolent Coordinating Committee (SNCC). Carmichael and Hamilton include much of Fanon's theory on colonialism in their work, beginning by framing the situation of former slaves in America as a colony situated inside a nation. "To put it another way, there is no "American dilemma" because black people in this country form a colony, and it is not in the interest of the colonial power to liberate them".

Another example is the indictment of the black middle class or what Fanon called the "colonized intellectual" as the indoctrinated followers of the colonial power. Fanon states, "The native intellectual has clothed his aggressiveness in his barely veiled desire to assimilate himself to the colonial world". A third example is the idea that the natives (African Americans) should be constructing new social systems rather than participating in the systems created by the settler population. Ture and Hamilton contend that "black people should create rather than imitate".

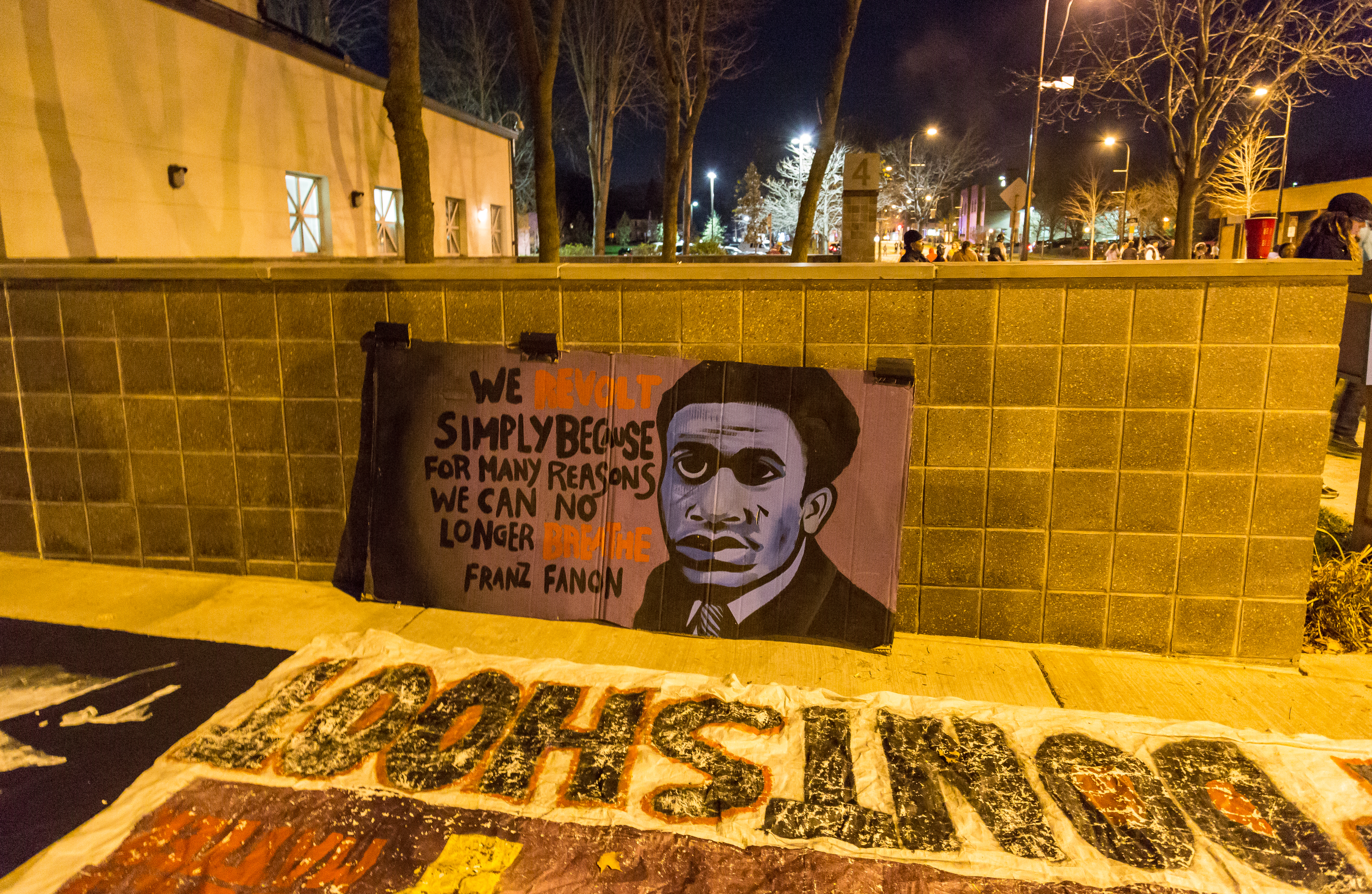
A banner outside the Minneapolis Police Department fourth precinct following the officer-involved shooting of Jamar Clark in November 2015.

The Black Power group that Fanon had the most influence on was the Black Panther Party (BPP). In 1970 Bobby Seale, the Chairman of the BPP, published a collection of recorded observations made while he was incarcerated entitled Seize the Time: The Story of the Black Panther Party and Huey P. Newton. While describing one of his first meetings with Huey P. Newton, Seale describes bringing him a copy of Wretched of the Earth. There are at least three other direct references to the book, all of them mentioning ways in which the book was influential and how it was included in the curriculum required of all new BPP members.

Beyond just reading the text, Seale and the BPP included much of the work in their party platform. The Panther 10 Point Plan contained six points which either directly or indirectly referenced ideas in Fanon's work. These six points included their contention that there must be an end to the "robbery by the white man", and "education that teaches us our true history and our role in present day society".

One of the most important elements adopted by the BPP was the need to build the "humanity" of the native. Fanon claimed that the realization by the native that s/he was human would mark the beginning of the push for freedom. The BPP embraced this idea through the work of their Community Schools and Free Breakfast Programs.

Bolivian Indianist Fausto Reinaga also had some Fanon influence and he mentions The Wretched of the Earth in his magnum opus La Revolución India, advocating for decolonisation of native South Americans from European influence. In 2015, Raúl Zibechi argued that Fanon had become a key figure for the Latin American left. In August 2021 Fanon's book Voices of liberation was one of those brought by Elisa Loncón to the new "plurinational library" of the Constitutional Convention of Chile.

Fanon's influence extended to the liberation movements of the Palestinians, the Tamils, African Americans and others. More recently, radical South African poor people's movements, such as Abahlali baseMjondolo (meaning 'people who live in shacks' in Zulu), have been influenced by Fanon's work. His work was a key influence on Brazilian educationist Paulo Freire, as well.

Fanon has also profoundly affected contemporary African literature. His work serves as an important theoretical gloss for writers including Ghana's Ayi Kwei Armah, Senegal's Ken Bugul and Ousmane Sembène, Zimbabwe's Tsitsi Dangarembga, and Kenya's Ngũgĩ wa Thiong'o. Ngũgĩ goes so far to argue in Decolonizing the Mind (1992) that it is "impossible to understand what informs African writing" without reading Fanon's Wretched of the Earth.

The Caribbean Philosophical Association offers the Frantz Fanon Prize for work that furthers the decolonization and liberation of mankind.

Fanon's writings on black sexuality in Black Skin, White Masks have garnered critical attention by a number of academics and queer theory scholars. Interrogating Fanon's perspective on the nature of black homosexuality and masculinity, queer theory academics have offered a variety of critical responses to Fanon's words, balancing his position within postcolonial studies with his influence on the formation of contemporary black queer theory.

Fanon's legacy has expanded even further into Black Studies and more specifically, into the theories of Afro-pessimism and Black critical theory. Thinkers such as Sylvia Wynter, David Marriott, Frank B. Wilderson III, Jared Yates Sexton, Calvin Warren, and Zakkiyah Iman Jackson have taken up Fanon's ontological, phenomenological, and psychoanalytic analyses of the Negro and the "zone of non-being" in order to develop theories of anti-Blackness. Putting Fanon in conversation with prominent thinkers such as Sylvia Wynter, Saidiya Hartman, and Hortense Spillers, and focusing primarily on the Charles Lam Markmann translation of Black Skin, White Masks, Black critical theorists and Afropessimists take seriously the ontological implications of the "Fact of Blackness" and "The Negro and Psychopathology", formulating the Black or the Slave as the non-relational, phobic object that constitutes civil society.

=== Namesakes ===
Numerous institutions and places bear the name of Frantz Fanon.

==== Algeria ====
- Algiers:
  - Boulevard Frantz Fanon (also known as Avenue du Docteur Frantz Fanon) runs through Alger Centre and is the site of the former headquarters of the National Library of Algeria.
  - Lycée Frantz-Fanon, a secondary school in downtown Algiers.
  - École Frantz Fanon, a school in Bab El Oued overlooking the Bay of Algiers.
- Annaba: Hôpital Frantz Fanon, a hospital in the city.
- Béjaïa: Hôpital Frantz Fanon, a hospital in the city.
- Blida: The psychiatric hospital where Fanon worked as head of service (1953–1956) was renamed the Frantz-Fanon Psychiatric Hospital of Blida.
- Bordj Bou Arréridj: Rue Dr Frantz Fanon, a street in the city.
- Boumerdès:
  - Cité Frantz Fanon, a residential neighborhood.
  - Poste Frantz Fanon, a post office operated by Algérie Poste.
- Dar El Beïda: Impasse Frantz Fanon, a cul-de-sac in the Algiers suburb.
- Oran: Place Frantz Fanon, a historic public square.
- Rouïba: Rue Frantz Fanon, a street in the Algiers suburb.
- Sétif: Rue Frantz Fanon, a street in the city.

==== France ====
- Gennevilliers: Allée Frantz-Fanon, a public pedestrian walkway located in the Paris metropolitan area.
- Montpellier: Centre Frantz Fanon, a community center in the city.
- Montreuil: Rue Frantz Fanon, a street in the eastern Paris suburb.
- Paris: Rue Frantz-Fanon, a street located in the 20th arrondissement.
- Saint-Denis: Square Frantz Fanon, a public municipal park.

==== French Guiana ====
- Kourou: Rue Frantz Fanon, a street in the commune.

==== Guadeloupe ====
- Saint-François: Rue Frantz Fanon, a street in the commune.

==== Italy ====
- Turin: Centro Frantz Fanon, an ethno-psychiatry and psychological counseling center established in 1996 for migrants and asylum seekers.

==== Martinique ====
- Fort-de-France: Centre Culturel Frantz Fanon, a cultural center in Fanon's birthplace.
- La Trinité: Lycée Frantz-Fanon, the city's primary public high school.
- Le Vauclin: Rue Frantz Fanon, a street in the commune.
- Rivière-Pilote: Avenue Frantz Fanon, an avenue in the commune.
- Schœlcher: Amphithéâtre Frantz Fanon, an amphitheater on the Schœlcher campus of the University of the French Antilles.

==== Netherlands ====
- Utrecht: Stichting Frantz Fanon Centrum (also known as Frantz Fanon Centrum), a Dutch organization based in the city.

==== Nigeria ====
- Gwarimpa Estate: Frantz Fanon Crescent, a residential street in the Abuja district.

==== Senegal ====
- Dakar: Auditorium Frantz Fanon, located on Rue Vincens.

==== Somalia ====
- Hargeisa: Frantz Fanon University, a private university located in the Somaliland capital.

==== South Africa ====
- Durban: Frantz Fanon School, a political education center established in 2020 by Abahlali baseMjondolo at the eKhenana Commune.

==== United States ====
- Los Angeles: Fanon Research and Development Center, an academic research center active from 1973 to 1987 at the Charles R. Drew Postgraduate Medical School.
- New Brunswick: Fanon Research Collective, an interdisciplinary working group at the Center for Cultural Analysis at Rutgers University.
- New York City: Frantz Fanon Lab for Decolonial Psychology, a clinical and community psychology research lab at Queens College (originally founded at The New School as the Frantz Fanon Lab for Intersectional Psychology).
- Prescott: Frantz Fanon Community Strategy Center (FFCSC), a social justice and community engagement center at Prescott College.

=== Works ===
- Black Skin, White Masks (1952), (1967 translation by Charles Lam Markmann: New York: Grove Press)
- A Dying Colonialism (1959), (1965 translation by Haakon Chevalier: New York, Grove Press)
- The Wretched of the Earth (1961), (1963 translation by Constance Farrington: New York: Grove Weidenfeld)
- Toward the African Revolution (1964), (1969 translation by Haakon Chevalier: New York: Grove Press)
- Alienation and Freedom (2018), eds Jean Khalfa and Robert J. C. Young, revised edition (translation by Steve Corcoran: London: Bloomsbury)

=== Books on Fanon ===
- Williams, James S. (2023). Frantz Fanon, Reaktion Books.
- Anthony Alessandrini (ed.), Frantz Fanon: Critical Perspectives (1999, New York: Routledge)
- Gavin Arnall, Subterranean Fanon: An Underground Theory of Radical Change (2020, New York: Columbia University Press)
- Stefan Bird-Pollan, Hegel, Freud and Fanon: The Dialectic of Emancipation (2014, Lanham, Maryland: Rowman & Littlefield Publishers Inc.)
- Hussein Abdilahi Bulhan, Frantz Fanon and the Psychology Of Oppression (1985, New York: Plenum Press), ISBN 0-306-41950-5
- David Caute, Frantz Fanon (1970, London: Wm. Collins and Co.)
- Alice Cherki, Frantz Fanon. Portrait (2000, Paris: Éditions du Seuil)
- Patrick Ehlen, Frantz Fanon: A Spiritual Biography (2001, New York: Crossroad 8th Avenue), ISBN 0-8245-2354-7
- Joby Fanon, Frantz Fanon, My Brother: Doctor, Playwright, Revolutionary (2014, United States: Lexington Books)
- Peter Geismar, Fanon (1971, Grove Press)
- Irene Gendzier, Frantz Fanon: A Critical Study (1974, London: Wildwood House), ISBN 0-7045-0002-7
- Nigel C. Gibson (ed.), Rethinking Fanon: The Continuing Dialogue (1999, Amherst, New York: Humanity Books)
- Nigel C. Gibson, Fanon: The Postcolonial Imagination (2003, Oxford: Polity Press)
- Nigel C. Gibson, Fanonian Practices in South Africa (2011, London: Palgrave Macmillan)
- Nigel C. Gibson (ed.), Living Fanon: Interdisciplinary Perspectives (2011, London: Palgrave Macmillan and the University of Kwa-Zulu Natal Press)
- Nigel C. Gibson and Roberto Beneduce Frantz Fanon, Psychiatry and Politics (2017, London: Rowman and Littlefield International and The University of Witwatersrand Press)
- Alexander V. Gordon, Frantz Fanon and the Fight for National Liberation (1977, Moscow: Nauka, in Russian)
- Lewis R. Gordon, Fanon and the Crisis of European Man: An Essay on Philosophy and the Human Sciences (1995, New York: Routledge)
- Lewis Gordon, What Fanon Said (2015, New York, Fordham) ISBN 9780823266081
- Lewis R. Gordon, T. Denean Sharpley-Whiting, & Renee T. White (eds), Fanon: A Critical Reader (1996, Oxford: Blackwell)
- Peter Hudis, Frantz Fanon: Philosopher of the Barricades (2015, London: Pluto Press)
- Christopher J. Lee, Frantz Fanon: Toward a Revolutionary Humanism (2015, Athens, OH: Ohio University Press)
- David Macey, Frantz Fanon: A Biography (2012, 2nd ed., London: Verso), ISBN 978-1-844-67773-3
- David Marriott, Whither Fanon?: Studies in the Blackness of Being (2018, Palo Alto, Stanford UP), ISBN 9780804798709
- Richard C. Onwuanibe, A Critique of Revolutionary Humanism: Frantz Fanon (1983, St. Louis: Warren Green)
- Adam Shatz, The Rebel's Clinic: The Revolutionary Lives of Frantz Fanon (2024, Farrar, Straus and Giroux), ISBN 9780374176426
- Ato Sekyi-Otu, Fanon's Dialectic of Experience (1996, Cambridge, Massachusetts: Harvard University Press)
- T. Denean Sharpley-Whiting, Frantz Fanon: Conflicts and Feminisms (1998, Lanham, Maryland: Rowman & Littlefield Publishers Inc.)
- Renate Zahar, Frantz Fanon: Colonialism and Alienation (1969, trans. 1974, Monthly Review Press)

=== Films on Fanon ===
- Isaac Julien, Frantz Fanon: Black Skin White Mask, a 1996 documentary (San Francisco: California Newsreel)
- Frantz Fanon, une vie, un combat, une œuvre, a 2001 documentary
- Concerning Violence: Nine scenes from the Anti-Imperialist Self-Defense, a 2014 documentary written and directed by Göran Olsson that is based on Frantz Fanon's essay "Concerning Violence", from his 1961 book The Wretched of the Earth.
- Luce – the main character of the movie wrote a paper about Frantz Fanon and is said to be inspired by his ideology.
- Fanon, a 2025 biopic directed by Jean-Claude Barny about Frantz Fanon's life and involvement in the Algerian independence movement.

=== Artworks ===
During a short residency for the 2011 Lyon Biennale, South African artist Tracey Rose conceived the video installation artwork In the Castle of My Skin, titled after the book by George Lamming. The four-hour artwork is a faux audition for the five-year-old French boy described in Black Skin, White Masks. The artist said the artwork arrived as a vision whilst walking through Lyon late one night. At the time, she was not aware that Fanon had lived there nor that Black Skin, White Masks had been written during Fanon's years there.

== See also ==
- French philosophy
- History of Martinique
- Achille Mbembe
- Postcolonialism
