= Academy of Democratic Modernity =

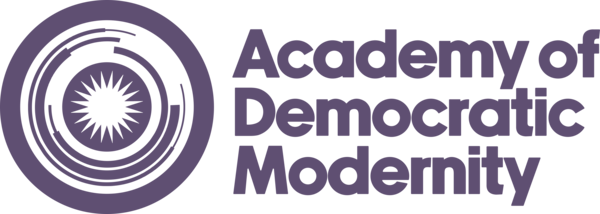
- Abbreviation: ADM
- Formation: 18 March 2022
- Type: Non-profit association
- Purpose: Political education, publications, international networking
- Headquarters: Geneva, Switzerland
- Website: https://democraticmodernity.com/

The Academy of Democratic Modernity (ADM) is an internationally active association focusing on political, social and theoretical questions related to the concept of Democratic Modernity. The initiative was founded on 18 March 2022. Since October 2024, the Academy of Democratic Modernity works as a non-profit association based in Geneva, Switzerland.

== History ==
The Academy of Democratic Modernity was founded on 18 March 2022, the anniversary of the Paris Commune, by activists and academics as a collective initiative.

In the following years, the initiative developed into an international network. Since October 2024 it works as an association in Switzerland with its seat in Geneva. Publications initially appeared in English and German and were later expanded to Spanish, French and Italian. Selected texts are also published in additional languages, including Portuguese, Hindi and Greek.

== Aims and objectives ==
The Academy of Democratic Modernity aims to disseminate and discuss the ideas and experiences of the Kurdistan Freedom Movement and its paradigm of Democratic Modernity. Through publications, educational work and international networking, the association seeks to foster dialogue with activists, scholars and social movements.

Thematically, ADM addresses issues such as democratic autonomy, women's liberation, youth organization, social ecology, communal economy, art and culture, and international solidarity. Its activities are framed as contributions to the development of alternative political and social models beyond capitalist modernity.

== Organization ==
The Academy of Democratic Modernity is organized as a non-profit association. Its governing bodies are the board and the general assembly, which convenes annually. The association's work is largely based on voluntary engagement and is primarily financed through donations.

== Activities ==
=== Publications ===
ADM regularly publishes articles, brochures and theoretical texts on political, social and ecological topics, including democratic modernity, internationalism, anti-capitalism, women's liberation, ecology and culture.

=== Conferences ===
The Academy of Democratic Modernity organizes and coordinates international conferences and meetings.

- The Art of Freedom – Strategies for Organising and Collective Resistance (Basel, 17–19 November 2023), with more than 180 participants from approximately 30 countries.
- Science for Society – Revolutionary Political Thought of Kurdistan (Slovenia, 2024), organized in cooperation with academic and civil society organizations.
- Peoples’ Platform Europe 2025 – Reclaim the Initiative! (Vienna, 17–19 February 2025), an international conference bringing together approximately 800 delegates from more than 160 organizations across 35 countries. ADM served as the main organizer of the event, which was also covered by independent media outlets.

Speakers at the conference included philosopher Silvia Federici, political theorist John Holloway, sociologist William I. Robinson, and jurist Mireille Fanon Mendès-France.

=== Educational work ===
The association organizes international educational seminars, workshops and panel discussions on political, social and ecological issues.

== International cooperation ==
The Academy of Democratic Modernity is part of various international networks, including the World Social Forum, Peoples’ Platform Europe and the Global Tapestry of Alternatives.

In addition, ADM has participated in international forums and congresses documented by external networks, including the Global Confluence on Radical Democracy, Autonomy, and Self-Determination, accompanied by the Global Tapestry of Alternatives and the conference, The Politics of Social Ecology: From Theory to Praxis of the Transnational Institute of Social Ecology (TRISE) in Athens in 2024.
