= Sociogeny =

Development of a social phenomenon

Sociogeny (French: sociogénie, from the Latin socius, i.e., "association" or "social," and the Greek γένεσις, denoting "origin") or sociogenesis is the development of a social phenomenon. That a phenomenon is sociogenetic thus indicates that it is socially produced, as opposed to ontologically given, immutable, or static. The concept was developed by Frantz Fanon in his 1952 book Black Skin, White Masks.

== Concept ==
Fanon was a Martinican writer, revolutionary, and psychoanalyst whose work focused on the pathologies and neuroses produced through European colonialism. In Black Skin, White Masks, Fanon expanded upon Freud's concepts of ontogeny and phylogeny, alongside which Fanon placed sociogeny. Freud employed ontogeny, a term borrowed from the field of biology, to describe the natural development of the individual subject; phylogeny, Freud proposed, could be used to understand the development of groups of subjects, such as families or societies.

Building upon Freud's work, Fanon developed the concept of sociogeny, which he employed to articulate how socially produced phenomena, such as poverty or crime, are linked to certain population groups as if those groups were biologically or ontogenetically predisposed towards those phenomena. The conflation of sociogeny and ontogeny – i.e., the conflation of a sociogenetic phenomena with an ontogenetic or "natural" predilection – plays an important role in the social construction of race, according to Fanon.

Since the time of Fanon's writing, the concept of sociogeny has been taken up by many scholars in disciplines such as sociology, psychology, Black studies, women's studies, and postcolonial studies. In particular, sociogeny has been a cornerstone in the thinking of Sylvia Wynter.
