= Devers =

Devers may refer to:

== People ==
- Amy Devers (born 1971), American furniture designer
- Claire Devers (born 1955), French film director and screenwriter
- Gail Devers (born 1966), American track and field athlete
- Gilles Devers (born 1956), French lawyer and academic
- Jacob L. Devers (1887–1979), American general
- Marcos Devers (born 1950), American politician
- Rafael Devers (born 1996), Dominican baseball player

== Places ==
- Devers, Texas, United States
