= Ontogeny (psychoanalysis) =

Ontogeny in a psychoanalytical context is the development of the whole organism, viewed from the light of occurrences during the life, not in the last place in the pre-history of early childhood, which has become unconscious, according to Sigmund Freud. After the possibilities of ontogenesis have been exhausted, phylogenesis might be explanatory of the development of a neurosis.

Frantz Fanon, a Martinican writer and analyst whose work focused on the pathologies and neuroses produced through European colonialism, adapted Freud's concept of ontogeny. Fanon developed the concepts of sociogeny and sociogenesis to explain how socially produced phenomena, such as poverty or crime, are linked to certain groups as if those groups were biologically – or ontogenetically – predisposed towards those phenomena. The conflation of sociogeny and ontogeny, Fanon argued, plays an important role in the social construction of race.

== See also ==
- Ontogeny
- Phylogenetics
- Phylogeny (psychoanalysis)
