= Ontogeny =

Origination and development of an organism

The initial stages of human embryogenesis

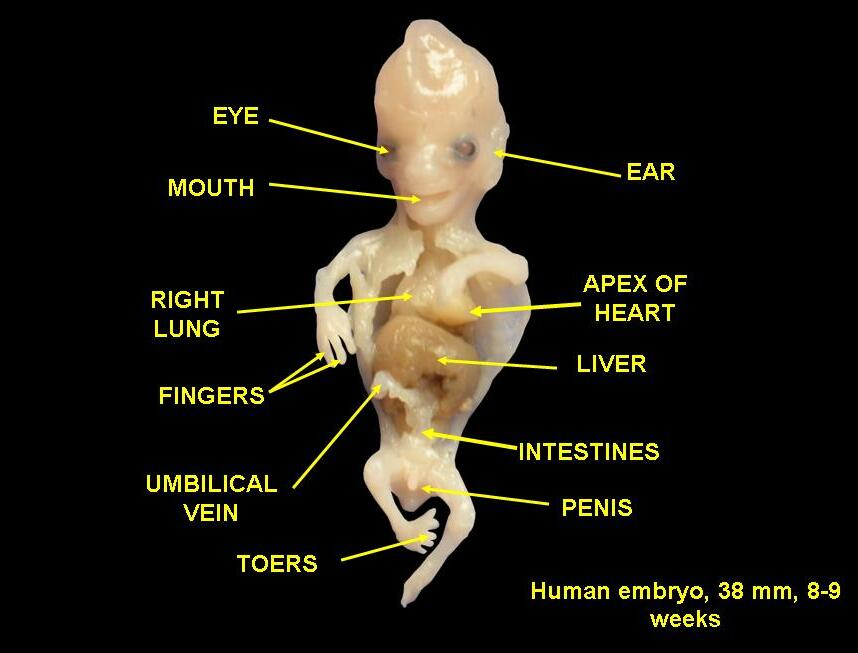
Parts of a human embryo

Ontogeny (also ontogenesis) is the origination and development of an organism (both physical and psychological, e.g., moral development), usually from the time of fertilization of the egg to adult. The term can also be used to refer to the study of the entirety of an organism's lifespan.

Ontogeny is the developmental history of an organism within its own lifetime, as distinct from phylogeny, which refers to the evolutionary history of a species. Another way to think of ontogeny is that it is the process of an organism going through all of the developmental stages over its lifetime. The developmental history includes all the developmental events that occur during the existence of an organism, beginning with the changes in the egg at the time of fertilization and events from the time of birth or hatching and afterward (i.e., growth, remolding of body shape, development of secondary sexual characteristics, etc.). While developmental (i.e., ontogenetic) processes can influence subsequent evolutionary (e.g., phylogenetic) processes (see evolutionary developmental biology and recapitulation theory), individual organisms develop (ontogeny), while species evolve (phylogeny).

Ontogeny, embryology and developmental biology are closely related studies and those terms are sometimes used interchangeably. Aspects of ontogeny are morphogenesis, the development of form and shape of an organism; tissue growth; and cellular differentiation. The term ontogeny has also been used in cell biology to describe the development of various cell types within an organism. Ontogeny is an important field of study in many disciplines, including developmental biology, cell biology, genetics, developmental psychology, developmental cognitive neuroscience, and developmental psychobiology. Ontogeny is used in anthropology as "the process through which each of us embodies the history of our own making".

== Etymology ==
The English-language word ontogeny comes from the Greek on meaning "a being, individual"; and "existence", and from the suffix -geny from the Greek ‑γένεια (-geneia), meaning "genesis", "origin", and "mode of production".

== History ==
The term ontogeny was coined by Ernst Haeckel, a German zoologist and evolutionist in the 1860s. Haeckel, born in Germany on February 16, 1834, was also a strong supporter of Darwinism. Haeckel suggested that ontogeny briefly and sometimes incompletely recapitulated or repeated phylogeny in his 1866 book, Generelle Morphologie der Organismen ("General Morphology of Organisms"). Even though his book was widely read, the scientific community was not very convinced or interested in his ideas, so he turned to producing more publications to get more attention. In 1866, Haeckel and others imagined development as producing new structures after earlier additions to the developing organism have been established. He proposed that individual development followed developmental stages of previous generations and that the future generations would add something new to this process, and that there was a causal parallelism between an animal's ontogeny and phylogeny. In addition, Haeckel suggested a biogenetic law that ontogeny recapitulates phylogeny, based on the idea that the successive and progressive origin of new species was based on the same laws as the successive and progressive origin of new embryonic structures. According to Haeckel, development produced novelties, and natural selection would eliminate species that had become outdated or obsolete. Though his view of development and evolution wasn't justifiable, future embryologists tweaked and collaborated with Haeckel's proposals and showed how new morphological structures can occur by the hereditary modification of embryonic development. Marine biologist Walter Garstang reversed Haeckel's relationship between ontogeny and phylogeny, stating that ontogeny creates phylogeny, not recapitulates it.

A seminal 1963 paper by Nikolaas Tinbergen named ontogeny as one of the four primary questions of biology, along with Julian Huxley's three others: causation, survival value and evolution. Tinbergen emphasized that the change of behavioral machinery during development was distinct from the change in behavior during development. We can conclude that the thrush itself, i.e. its behavioral machinery, has changed only if the behavior change occurred while the environment was held constant...When we turn from description to causal analysis, and ask in what way the observed change in behavior machinery has been brought about, the natural first step is to try to distinguish between environmental influences and those within the animal...In ontogeny the conclusion that a certain change is internally controlled (is 'innate') is reached by elimination. Tinbergen was concerned that the elimination of environmental factors is difficult to establish, and the use of the word innate is often misleading.

== Developmental stages ==
Development of an organism happens through fertilization, cleavage, blastulation, gastrulation, organogenesis, and metamorphosis into an adult. Each species of animal has a slightly different journey through these stages, since some stages might be shorter or longer when compared to other species, and where the offspring develops is different for each animal type (e.g., in a hard egg shell, uterus, soft egg shell, on a plant leaf, etc.).

=== Fertilization ===
In humans, the process of fetal development starts after sperm fertilizes an egg and they fuse together, kickstarting embryonic development. The fusion of egg and sperm into a zygote changes the surrounding membrane to not allow any more sperm to penetrate the egg, so multiple fertilizations can be prevented. Fusion of a zygote also activates the egg so it can begin undergoing cell division. Each animal species might not have specifically a sperm and an egg, but two gametes that contain half of the species' typical genetic material and the membranes of these gametes fuse to start creating an offspring.

=== Cleavage ===
Not long after successful fertilization by sperm, the zygote undergoes many mitotic divisions, which are also non-sexual cell divisions. Cleavage is the process of cell division, so the starting zygote becomes a collection of identical cells which is a morula and contains cells called blastomeres. Cleavage prepares the zygote to become an embryo, which is from 2 weeks to 8 weeks after conception (fertilization) in humans.

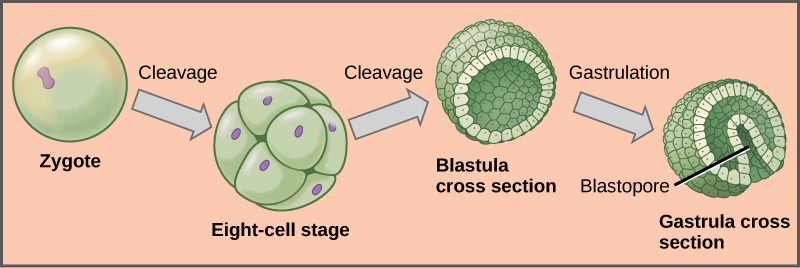
Process of zygote to gastrula in development

=== Blastulation ===
After the zygote has become an embryo, it continues dividing into a hollow sphere of cells, which is a blastula. These outer cells form a single epithelial layer, the blastoderm, that essentially encases the fluid-filled inside that is the blastocoel. The figure to the right shows the basic process that is modified in different species. Blastulation differs slightly in different species, but in mammals, the eight-cell stage embryo forms into a slightly different type of blastula, called a blastocyst. Other species such as sea stars, frogs, chicks, and mice have all the same structures in this stage, yet the orientation of these features differs, plus these species have additional types of cells in this stage.

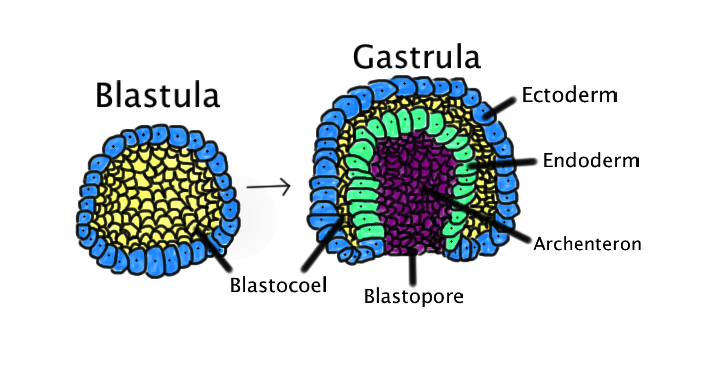
Blastula to gastrula more detailed

=== Gastrulation ===
After blastulation, the single-layered blastula expands and reorganizes into multiple layers, a gastrula (seen in the figure to the right). Reptiles, birds and mammals are triploblastic organisms, meaning the gastrula comprises three germ layers; the endoderm (inner layer), mesoderm (middle layer), and ectoderm (outer layer). As seen in the figure below, each germ layer will become multi-potent stem cells that can become a specific tissue depending on the germ layer and is what happens in humans. This differentiation of germ layers differs slightly, because not all of the organs and tissues below are in all organisms, but corresponding body systems can be substituted in place of these.

=== Organogenesis ===
In the figure below, human germ cells are able to differentiate into the specific organs and tissues they become later on in life. Germ cells are able to migrate to their final locations to rearrange themselves and some organs are made of two germ layers; one for the outside, the other for the inside. The endoderm cells become the internal linings of organisms, such as the stomach, colon, small intestine, liver, and pancreas of the digestive system and the lungs. The mesoderm gives rise to other tissues not formed by the ectoderm, such as the heart, muscles, bones, blood, dermis of the skin, bone marrow, and the urogenital system. This germ layer is more specific for species, as it is the distinguishing layer of the three that can identify evolutionarily higher life-forms (e.g., bilateral organisms like humans) from lower-life forms (with radial symmetry). Lastly, the ectoderm is the outer layer of cells that become the epidermis and hair while being the precursor to the mammary glands, central nervous system, and the peripheral nervous systems.

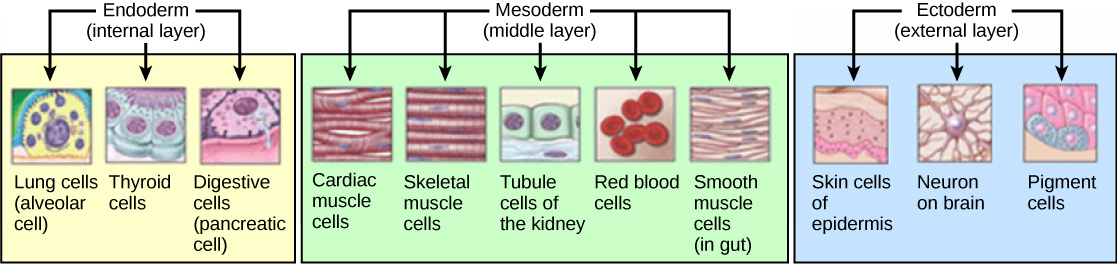
Germ layers and what tissues they become in humans

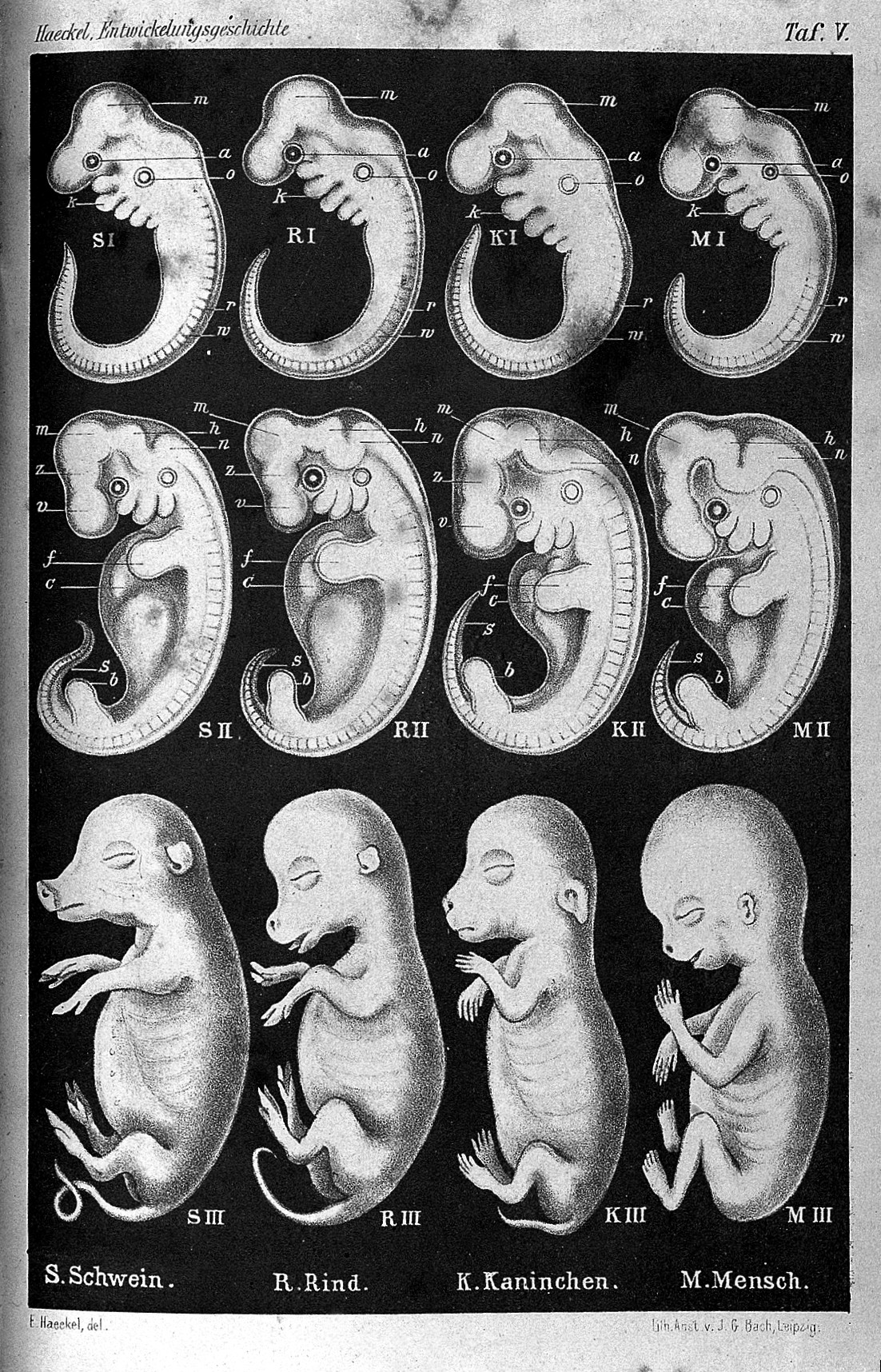
Ernst Haeckel, Anthropogenie.

The figure above shows how the development of a pig, cow, rabbit, and human offspring are similar when compared to one another. This figure shows how the germ layers can become different organs and tissues in evolutionarily higher life-forms and how these species essentially develop very similarly. Additionally, it shows how multiple species develop in a parallel manner but branch off to develop more specific features for the organism such as hooves, a tail, or ears.

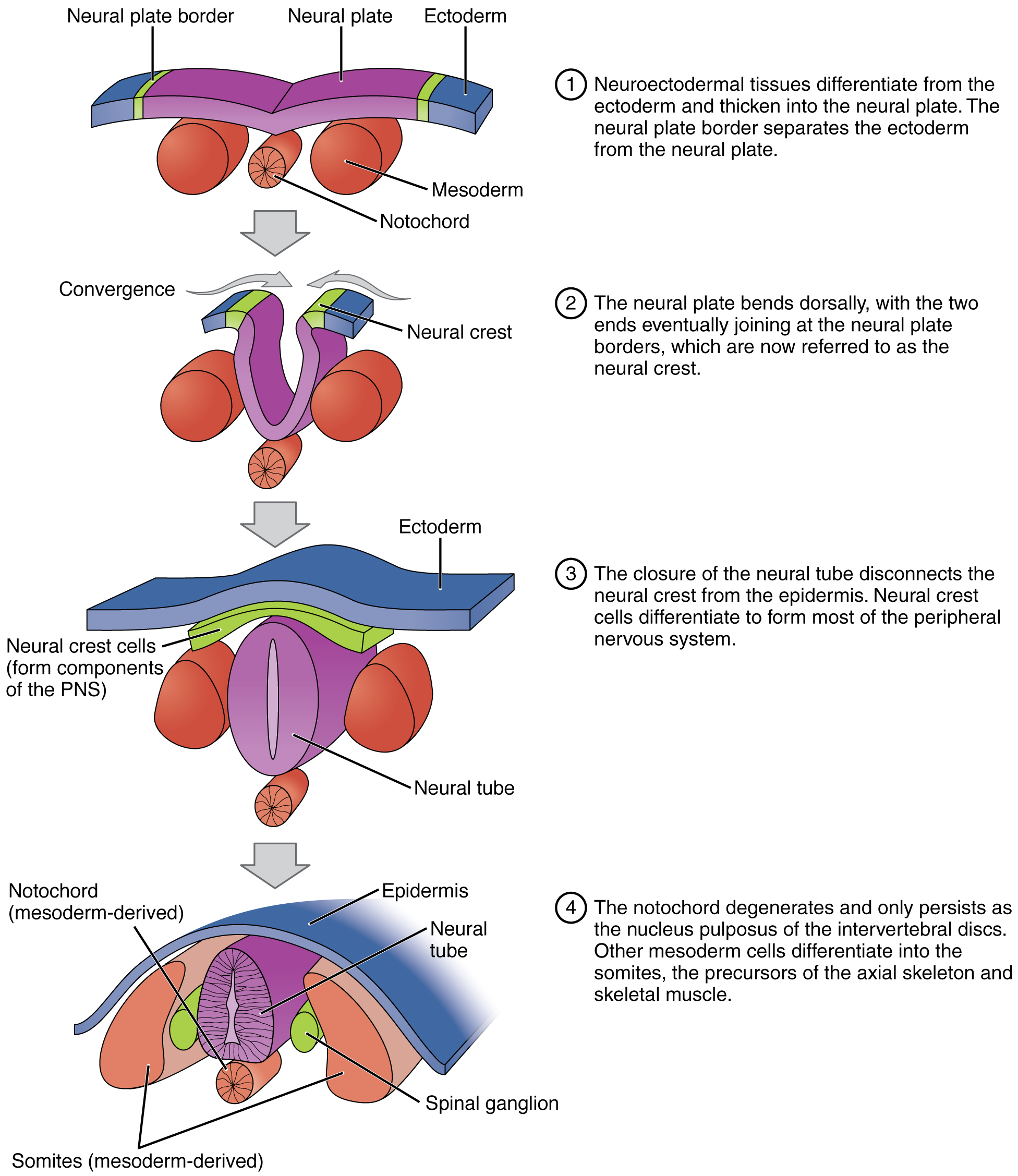
Primary neurulation detailed

==== Neurulation ====
In developing vertebrate offspring, a neural tube is formed through either primary or secondary neurulation. Some species develop their spine and nervous system using both primary and secondary neurulation, while others use only primary or secondary neurulation. In human fetal development, primary neurulation occurs during weeks 3 and 4 of gestation to develop the brain and spinal cord. Then during weeks 5 and 6 of gestation, secondary neurulation forms the lower sacral and coccygeal cord.

===== Primary Neurulation =====
The diagram to the right illustrates primary neurulation, which is the process of cells surrounding the neural plate interacting with neural plate cells to proliferate, converge, and pinch off to form a hollow tube above the notochord and mesoderm. This process is discontinuous and can start at different points along the cranial-caudal axis necessary for it to close. After the neural crest closes, the neural crest cells and ectoderm cells separate and the ectoderm becomes the epidermis surrounding this complex. The neural crest cells differentiate to become components of most of the peripheral nervous system in animals. Next, the notochord degenerates to become only the nucleus pulposus of the intervertebral discs and the mesoderm cells differentiate to become the somites and skeletal muscle later on. Also during this stage, the neural crest cells become the spinal ganglions, which function as the brain in organisms like earthworms and arthropods. In more advanced organisms like amphibians, birds and mammals; the spinal ganglions consists of a cluster of nerve bodies positioned along the spinal cord at the dorsal and ventral roots of a spinal nerve, which is a pair of nerves that correspond to a vertebra of the spine.

===== Secondary Neurulation =====
In secondary neurulation, caudal and sacral regions of the spine are formed after primary neurulation is finished. This process initiates once primary neurulation is finished and the posterior neuropore closes, so the tail bud can proliferate and condense, then create a cavity and fuse with the central canal of the neural tube. Secondary neurulation occurs in the small region starting at the spinal tail bud up to the posterior neuropore, which is the open neural folds near the tail region that don't close through primary neurulation. As canalization progresses over the next few weeks, neurons and ependymal cells (cells that create cerebral spinal fluid) differentiate to become the tail end of the spinal cord. Next, the closed neural tube contains neuroepithelial cells that immediately divide after closure and a second type of cell forms; the neuroblast. Neuroblast cells form the mantle layer, which later becomes the gray matter, which then gives rise to a marginal layer that becomes the white matter of the spinal cord. Secondary neurulation is seen in the neural tube of the lumbar and tail vertebrae of frogs and chicks and in both instances, this process is like a continuation of gastrulation.

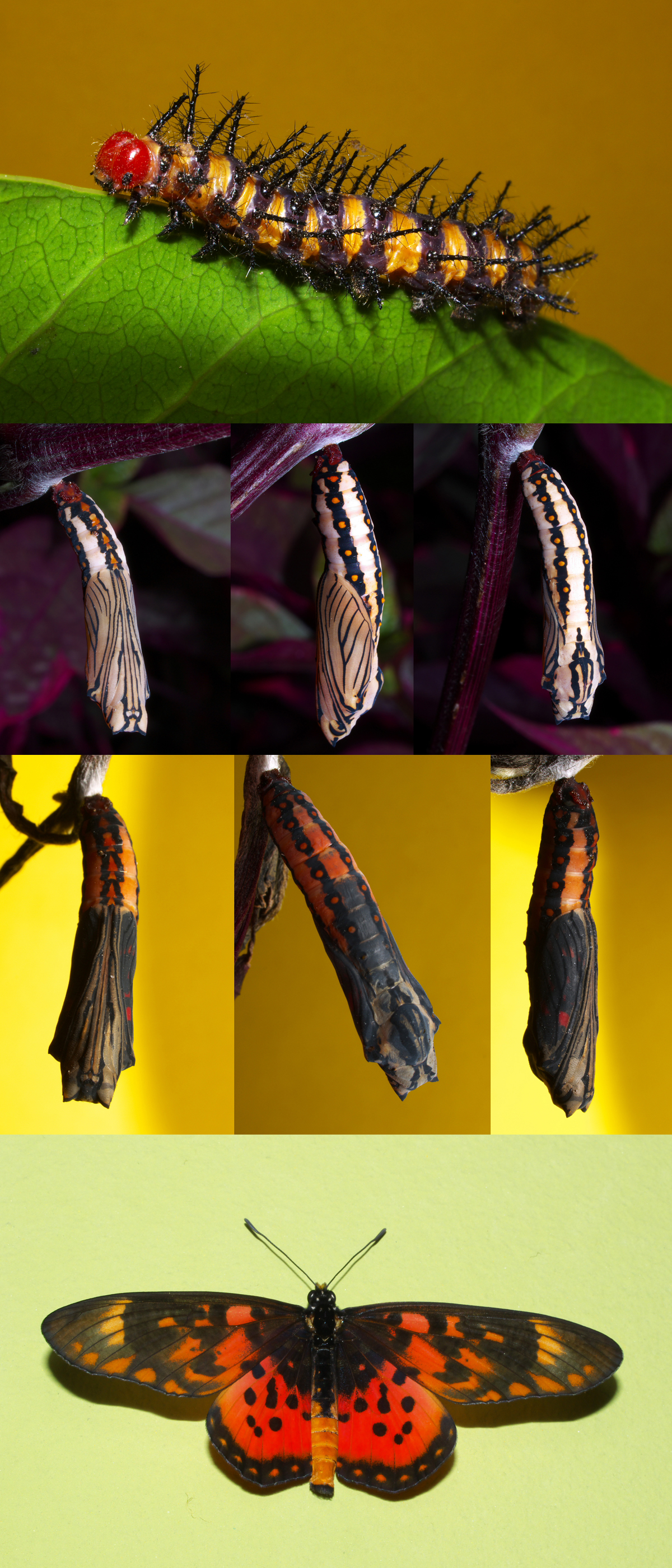
Acraea zetes caterpillar to pupae to butterfly metamorphosis by Nick Hobgood

=== Larval and juvenile phases ===
In most species, the young organism that is just born or hatched is not sexually mature yet and in most animals, this young organism looks quite different than the adult form. This young organism is the larva and is the intermediate form before metamorphosing into an adult. A well known example of a larval form of an animal is the caterpillar of butterflies and moths. Caterpillars keep growing and feeding in order for enough energy during the pupal stage, when necessary body parts for metamorphosis are grown. The juvenile phase is different in plants and animals, but in plants juvenility is an early phase of plant growth in which plants can't flower. In animals, the juvenile stage is most commonly found in social mammals, such as wild dogs, monkeys, apes, lions, wolves, and more. In humans, puberty marks the end of this stage and adolescence follows. Some species begin puberty and reproduction before the juvenile stage is over, such as in female non-human primates. The larval and pupal stages can be seen in the figure to the right.

=== Metamorphosis ===
The process of an organism's body undergoing structural and physical changes after birth or hatching to become suitable for its adult environment is metamorphosis. For example, amphibian tadpoles have a maturation of liver enzymes, hemoglobin, and eye pigments, in addition to their nervous, digestive, and reproductive systems being remodeled. In all species, molting and juvenile hormones appear to regulate these changes. The figure to the right shows the stages of life in butterflies and their metamorphosis transforms the caterpillar into a butterfly.

=== Adulthood ===
Adulthood is the stage of when physical and intellectual maturity have been achieved and this differs between species. In humans, adulthood is thought to be around 20 or 21 years old and is the longest stage of life, but in all species it ends with death. In dogs, small breeds (e.g., Yorkshire Terrier, Chihuahua, Cocker Spaniel, etc.) physically mature faster than large breeds (e.g., Saint Bernard, Great Dane, Golden Retriever, etc.), so adulthood is reached anywhere from 12 to 24 months or 1 to 2 years. In contrast, many insect species have long larval stages and the adult stage is only for reproduction. The silkworm moths don't have mouthparts and don't feed, so they have to consume enough food during the larval stage for energy to survive and mate.

==== Senescence ====
Senescence is when cells stop dividing but don't die, but these cells can build up and cause problems in the body. These cells can release substances that cause inflammation and can damage healthy nearby cells. Senescence can be induced by un-repaired DNA damage (e.g., from radiation, old age, etc.) or other cellular stress and also is the state of being old.

=== Ontogenetic allometry ===
Most organisms undergo allometric changes in shape as they grow and mature, while others engage in metamorphosis. Even reptiles (non-avian sauropsids, e.g., crocodilians, turtles, snakes, and lizards), in which the offspring are often viewed as miniature adults, show a variety of ontogenetic changes in morphology and physiology.

== See also ==
- Developmental biology
- Ernst Haeckel
- Genetics
- Recapitulation theory, the idea that ontogeny recapitulates phylogeny
- Embryology
- Organogenesis
- Ontogeny (psychoanalysis)
- Phylogenetics
- Phylogeny (psychoanalysis)
- Apoptosis
- Evo-devo (evolutionary developmental biology)
- Cellular differentiation
- Cell biology
- Nikolaas Tinbergen
- Metamorphosis
- Morphology
- Physiology
- Eco-evo-devo (ecological evolutionary developmental biology)
- Darwinism
- Fertilization
- Cleavage
- Blastulation
- Gastrulation
- Germ layers
- Neurulation
- Spinal cord
- Metamorphosis
- Larva
- Adulthood
- Senescence
