= Frantz Fanon, une vie, un combat, une œuvre =

2001 film by Cheikh Djemai

- Directed by: Cheikh Djemai
- Screenplay by: Cheikh Djemai
- Produced by: Les Productions de la Lanterne France Ô (ex RFO)
- Cinematography: Robert Millie François Rosolato
- Edited by: Jean-Pierre Sanchez
- Release date: 2001
- Running time: 52 minutes
- Countries: Algeria; France; Tunisia

Frantz Fanon, une vie, un combat, une œuvre is a 2001 documentary film.

== Synopsis ==
This movie depicts Frantz Fanon's life. A psychiatrist from Martinique, he became a spokesman for the anti-colonialist struggle. In 1952, Frantz Fanon wrote Black Skin, White Masks, an analysis of racism and the ways in which its victims internalize it. In the 50s, he aided the rebels of the Algerian anti-colonial war. Expelled from Algeria in 1956, he moved to Tunis, Tunisia, where he wrote for the rebel newspaper El Moudjahid, founded one of Africa's first psychiatric clinics and wrote several books on decolonization. He died from leukemia in Washington, D.C., at the age of 36.
