= Victor Sévère =

Deputy of the National Assembly
- In office 20 May 1906 – 31 May 1914
- In office 11 May 1924 – 31 May 1928
- In office 3 May 1936 – 31 May 1942

Personal details
- Born: 1 November 1867 Case-Pilote, (Martinique)
- Died: 2 October 1957 (aged 89) Fort-de-France, (Martinique)
- Party: Radical Party

Victor Severe (born 1 November 1867 in Case-Pilote, Martinique; died 2 October 1957) was a politician from Martinique. He was mayor of Fort de France several times between 1900 and 1945 and served in the Chamber of Deputies of France from 1906 to 1914, 1924 to 1928 and 1936 to 1942. He was also President of the General Council of Martinique from 1905 to 1906.

== Biography ==
Victor Sévère undertook his secondary studies at the lycée de Saint-Pierre where he obtained his baccalaureate, continuing to study law in France. After completing his degree, he was admitted to the Cayenne bar. In French Guiana, he was elected general councillor from 1893 to 1896. He then returned to his native Martinique and joined the bar in Fort-de-France.

Jules Sévère, his brother, was mayor of Case-Pilote from 1897 to 1913.

== Second World War ==
At the beginning of the Occupation, when Martinique was administered by Admiral Robert, Victor Sévère was fiercely opposed both to it and to the Vichy regime. In 1941, he was removed from the mayor's office in the capital and Admiral Robert appointed Jean de Laguarigue in his place. In 1942 he participated in the Resistance and was particularly noticed after the landing in North Africa. In 1943, he contributed to the formation of the National Liberation Committee which ensured that the West Indies joined the Free French Forces.
