= Toward the African Revolution =

Collection of essays written by Frantz Fanon

- First edition (French)
- Author: Frantz Fanon
- Original title: Pour la Revolution Africaine
- Language: French
- Published: 1964
- Publisher: François Maspero
- Publication place: France
- ISBN: 0-8021-3090-9

Toward the African Revolution (French: Pour la Revolution Africaine) is a collection of essays written by Frantz Fanon, which was published in 1964, after Fanon's death. The essays in the book were written from 1952 to 1961, between the publication of his two most famous works, Black Skin, White Masks and The Wretched of the Earth. Fanon expands on the themes of colonization, racism, decolonization, African unity, and the Algerian Revolution in the essays, most of which come from his time writing for El Moudjahid, the official newspaper of the FLN.

== Summary ==
The essays in Toward the African Revolution are split into five sections, roughly grouped by topic and manner of original publication. They help to trace the evolution of Fanon's thought over time, from his years working as a psychiatrist through the period when he actively worked for the FLN and his exile from Algeria in Tunisia. Most of the writing involves his political theory of opposition to colonialism as a dehumanizing force that cannot be reformed, as well as the ways in which he thought Africans ought to resist colonialism.

=== The Problem of the Colonized ===
The first section of the book (French: Le colonisé en question) deals with the views that outsiders hold of North Africans. Fanon ostensibly wrote only two other essays on this topic, but one of them, "West Indians and Africans," was actually written by Pierre Chaulet. Fanon did not want to write the article, but it was incorrectly attributed to him after it was published anonymously in El Moudjahid.

In his essay "The North African Syndrome," Fanon challenged the prejudices of French doctors against Algerians and other North Africans, whose complaints of illness or pain were often dismissed as whining or laziness. Many European psychiatrists had concluded that Africans were destined to be less intelligent and less emotionally stable than Europeans, and this approach tainted their professional practice. Written while Fanon was still studying to become a psychiatrist, he constructs the imagined, stereotypical Arab in the minds of the French doctors, who would have considered themselves more civilized: "Who are they, those creatures starving for humanity who stand buttressed against the frontiers (though I know them from experience to be terribly distinct) of complete recognition?" This is one of Fanon's early works, and it represents some of his original thinking on the institutional and societal nature of colonialism that was most dangerous to Africans, as well as a blend of the political thought and psychological expertise that he would blend throughout his life.

=== Racism and Culture ===
The second section, Racism and Culture (French: Racisme et culture), is a single speech given by Fanon in 1956 at the first Congress of Black Writers and Artists, and it was originally published in a special edition of Présence Africaine. His central point is that racism "is only one element of a vaster whole: that of the systematized oppression of a people." His target is the attempts by many European colonial governments (notably the French) to prove that they do not hold racist prejudices while they continued to colonize foreign lands and export their own cultures as the superior choice. Fanon saw a logical impossibility in someone abandoning racist ideas while also participating in a system or institution built upon racism, like colonialism.

=== For Algeria ===
This brief section (French: Pour l'Algérie) consists of a pair of letters that Fanon wrote to French residents of Algeria detailing the problems of how they viewed the country. The first, "Letter to a Frenchman," explains the "essential ignorance" that the French had of native Algerians, whom they generally dismissed as helpless beasts and never formed close relationships with. This was likely sent to R. Lacaton, a French psychiatrist who worked at the same mental hospital as Fanon in Blida (the hospital has since been named for Fanon).

The second half of this section is the letter of resignation that Fanon sent in 1956 to announce that he could no longer practice psychiatry for the French colonial government in good faith. The central problem he faced was, as one scholar put it, "the futility of practicing psychiatry in such a colonial situation." Fanon did not see any practical benefit to helping individual Algerians when the colonial system he worked in was harming the mental health of the entire population. Working at the hospital likely sped up or influenced his decision to formally abandon the colonial enterprise and join the FLN outright, as his duties at the hospital forced him to see firsthand the mental and physical effects that the war, especially the torture used by the French forces, had on Algerian independence fighters.

=== Toward the Liberation of Africa ===
Twenty of Fanon's essays that explain the movement from opposing colonialism to actively working to end it, in Algeria and elsewhere, are collected in a section titled Toward the Liberation of Africa (French: Vers la libération de l'Afrique) that takes up most of Toward the African Revolution. Most of these essays were originally published anonymously in El Moudjahid, both to protect his identity and as "an expression of revolutionary solidarity."

Especially troubling to Fanon in this portion of the book is the use of torture by French colonial authorities against Algerians. He argued that torture was not an exceptional flaw of the war, but "an expression and a means of the occupant-occupied relationship." Torture was an extreme feature of the colonial relationship, but there was no way to justify colonialism without tacitly accepting the use of torture, according to Fanon. He particularly criticized the French who opposed torture in Algeria on the grounds that it creates, in Fanon's words, "a vast dehumanization of French youth," by turning French soldiers into monsters, instead of saying that the central problem of torture was the injustice wrought upon Algerians. This position was somewhat controversial when Fanon originally published it in El Moudjahid, as it would likely alienate many on the French left who might otherwise be more supportive of the revolutionaries in Algeria.

Fanon warned in other essays of the dangers neocolonialism posed to nominally free states: European leaders exhibited "The acceptance of a nominal sovereignty and the absolute refusal of real independence" when their colonies tried to break away. Economic domination would replace the formal political control, so that the former colonies still survived at the mercy of the old powers, and this would be justified under preserving the rights of the settlers. The competition for resources and occasional military interventions by the powerful states in their former colonies justify even more neocolonialism, as they perceive a strategic need to create and maintain spheres of influence.

=== African Unity ===
The final section, African Unity (French: Unité africaine), includes two works about the ways that African nations could work together militarily during and after the end of formal European colonialism. The first part is a log of Fanon's travels around Africa while working as a diplomat for the FLN during the Algerian War. He concludes that colonialism can only be fully defeated through a commitment to African unity and Marxist ideologies, or the powerful citizens in each newly independent country will start wars with each other: "The triumphant middle classes are the most impetuous, the most enterprising, the most annexationist in the world."

Fanon also discusses the overthrow and murder of Patrice Lumumba, the first prime minister of the Democratic Republic of the Congo. The critical mistake in the African response to the Belgian-engineered rebel movement in the Congo was to work with the United Nations to maintain peace in the country, since the United Nations, in Fanon's words, "is the legal card used by the imperialist interests when the card of brute force has failed." African nations needed their own instrument for military and diplomatic unity, so that they could respond to African problems without relying upon the institutions created and dominated by colonial powers.

== Reception ==
Toward the African Revolution was published a few years after Fanon's death. He had become an especially popular thinker in the English-speaking world around this time, and the combination of his popularity and the revolutionary nature of his ideas led one contemporary commentator to title him "a modern Marx." That reviewer particularly noted the evolution of Fanon's thought throughout the book, as the Algerian War progressed. His popularity was especially visible at American universities, as it remains today, and his works are primarily read in English. Another writer called him "a legendary hero" just three years after his death from cancer.

The book itself was not highly praised, as it was more of a collection of loose essays than Black Skin, White Masks or The Wretched of the Earth, but reviewers noted that Fanon's writing was still excellent, and that the individual essays were still valuable. Others said that because the scope of this collection gave a more complete picture of Fanon and his growth throughout time, it would serve as a good primer on Fanon's life until an actual, comprehensive biography was written.

Like Fanon's other works, Toward the African Revolution had influenced the thought of black leaders in the United States. Stokely Carmichael directly referenced Fanon's predictions about neocolonialism and the fundamental racism of colonialism in warning that individuals who were not themselves racist could not be trusted if they were still part of institutions built on racism. George Jackson and Bobby Seale also regularly quoted Fanon in their own work.
