= Frantz Fanon (book) =

2023 book by James S. Williams

- Cover
- Author: James S. Williams
- Language: English
- Series: Critical Lives
- Subject: The life and work of Frantz Fanon
- Publisher: Reaktion Books, University of Chicago Press
- Publication date: November 2023
- Media type: Print, digital
- ISBN: 978-1-78914-831-2

Frantz Fanon is a 2023 critical biography of the Martinican psychiatrist and anti-colonial thinker Frantz Fanon by British scholar of modern French literature and cinema James S. Williams. The book was published by Reaktion Books, part of its Critical Lives series, and distributed by the University of Chicago Press, the biography covers Fanon's World War II service, his role in the Algerian War of Independence, and his work as both a physician and political figure and activist.

== Summary ==
Williams presents Frantz Fanon as a psychiatrist, militant, and writer whose life spanned multiple worlds and political contexts. In the opening, the book sets out Fanon's background as both doctor and revolutionary, followed by a closer look at his early years in colonial Martinique and his enlistment in the Free French forces during the Second World War. Subsequent sections portray his postwar student experiences in Lyon, where his interactions with Négritude and existentialism shaped his early thinking on race and identity. Williams then illustrates Fanon's pioneering medical practice at Saint-Alban in southern France and Blida in northern Algeria, emphasizing the social dimensions of psychiatry and the ways Fanon's encounters with colonial violence informed his approach to treatment. Later chapters depict his work in Tunis and his increasing engagement with the National Liberation Front, culminating in discussions of his ambassadorship in Accra and his advocacy for broader African unity. Concluding parts describe Fanon's final days and the evolution of his legacy, tracing how his ideas found resonance in later movements and debates. Throughout, Williams integrates biographical narrative with Fanon's theoretical development, aligning each stage of Fanon's life with a corresponding shift in his political and clinical perspectives.

== Reviews ==
Marjorie Mayo described the book as a remarkable account, an encouragement to read Fanon's works ourselves. Mayo noted how the book cleverly outlined how Fanon developed his innovative approaches to treating colonialism throughout the years as he goes through different phases of his life; from his assumption of French education enabling Black students like himself to be assimilated, his role in the struggle of Algeria's independence, his contribution to psychiatry and his books, specifically Black Skin, White Masks (1952), the spread of European ‘civilisation’ and "the wretched of the earth". She particularly admired how the criticisms on Fanon by the left, his contribution to some Pan-African leaders and his personal shortcomings were covered in the book.

This book exhibits Fanon's lifelong search for a genuinely progressive humanism and his commitment to movement and change commended Miron Clay-Gilmore in his review of James S. Williams' Frantz Fanon. Clay-Gilmore found the book to have meticulously explored Fanon's themes of violence, sociogeny and Pan-Africanism especially for students who are interested in Fanonian thoughts across disciplines. He also found William's exploration of Fanon's life through the women in his life to be a refreshing thing. Miron Clay-Gilmore critiqued Williams' biography for overly emphasizing Fanon's ideas on sociogeny and violence, suggesting these are not central to contemporary Black/Africana Studies or Africana Philosophy. While Fanon remains influential, Clay-Gilmore argued that Williams' optimistic assessment of these themes might not align with current scholarship. However, he appreciated Williams' exploration of Fanon's evolving views on violence and universal humanism, seeing it as a valuable starting point for new debates.

Liam Johnston wrote widely on Fanon while reviewing the biography by James Williams. Because of the multiple events of life that surrounded him and the temptations to psychoanalyze him, Johnston wrote how Williams resisted such temptations and penned how Fanon not merely reacted to the events around him but rather influenced them. From his role in the French army against the Nazis where he found himself in racial unease in the racial hierarchy of the supposedly free army, his stay at Lyon where he faced racism, his coining of the term sociogeny where he argued no racial group possessed any inherent characteristics but rather was determined by social factors, his contribution to psychiatry and his role in the FLN, Johnston found the analysis of Fanon impressive. Johnston also pointed out how William saw Fanon as a performer able to inhabit convincingly the roles required of him in politics and writing. He remarked further how, for Williams, Sartre's preface of Fanon's last book The Wretched of The Earth (1961) complicated to the point of distortion Fanon's assessment of violence's role in liberation and decolonization. Johnston found the biography and the works of Fanon to remain relevant in today's resistance of Palestinians.

Tunku Varadarajan praised the work for providing "an account of the life and ideas of its protagonist that was sharply focused and wise," noting in particular that, while concise, it nonetheless offered detailed insight into Frantz Fanon's personal and political dimensions. He highlighted how the author succinctly wove essential biographical material into the narrative without losing sight of the complexities that shaped Fanon's revolutionary stance. Varadarajan also commended the book's clarity and thoroughness, contrasting it with more expansive treatments while emphasizing that it remained rich in specifics about Fanon's life and thought.

In his essay, T.J. Clark highlighted how the book challenges entrenched misconceptions about Fanon's life and work. Clark singled out Williams' correct identification of a famous photograph – long misattributed to a 1959 "writers' conference" – as actually capturing Fanon in 1957 at an FLN press conference in Tunis. Clark values Williams' book for "bearing down hard on many items of received wisdom," commending its incisive approach in debunking myths such as the notion that Fanon had time in 1959 to attend literary gatherings. By pointing to Williams’ careful research and his precise attention to detail, Clark underscores the importance of Williams’ scholarship in clarifying misreadings of Fanon's life and in offering a tighter, more accurate picture of the revolutionary psychiatrist's commitments and constraints.
