= A Dying Colonialism =

1959 book by Frantz Fanon

- Cover of the third edition
- Author: Frantz Fanon
- Original title: L'An V de la Révolution Algérienne
- Language: French
- Publication date: 1959
- Publication place: France
- Media type: Print

A Dying Colonialism (French: L'an V de la révolution algérienne) is a 1959 book by the psychiatrist Frantz Fanon, in which the author provides an account of the Algerian War. The book details cultural and political changes that emerge due to the rejection of French colonial oppression by the Algerian.

== Contents ==
Issues discussed include the role of women in the liberation struggle, changes to family life, the role of the radio, language, and medicine both as tools of oppression and complicity on one hand as well as tools of freedom and liberation, and Algeria's European minority and their role as potential allies in the conflict.

== Publication history ==
The book was originally published in France by Maspero as L'An V de la Révolution Algérienne (Year Five of the Algerian Revolution). It was translated into English in 1965 and published by Monthly Review under the title Studies In A Dying Colonialism. In 1967, it was shortened to A Dying Colonialism when appearing as a mass-market paperback by Grove Press.

== Sources ==
- Justseeds: Blog: JBbTC 105: Frantz Fanon pt.5
