= Aïn Kerma =

- Commune and town
- Location of Aïn Kerma within El Taref Province

- Location of Aïn Kerma within El Taref Province
- Country: Algeria
- Province: El Taref Province

Population (1998)
  - Total: 12,182
- Time zone: UTC+1 (CET)

Aïn Kerma is a town and commune in El Taref Province, Algeria. According to the 1998 census, it has a population of 12,182.

Frantz Fanon is buried here.
