= Mireille Fanon Mendès-France =

French jurist and anti-racist activist (born 1948)

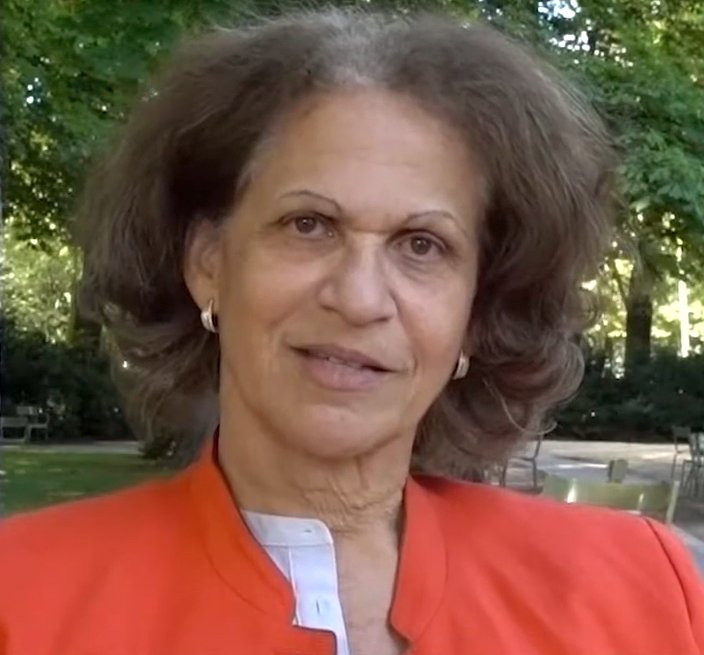
- Fanon Mendès-France in 2017
- Born: 24 November 1948 (age 77); Cahors, France
- Occupations: Jurist, activist
- Father: Frantz Fanon

Mireille Fanon Mendès-France, also Mireille Fanon-Mendès France (born 24 November 1948) is a French jurist and anti-racist activist.

== Career ==
Fanon Mendès-France teaches at Paris Descartes University. She was also a visiting professor at the University of California, Berkeley in international law and conflict resolution. She has also worked for UNESCO and the French National Assembly.

Together with Gilles Devers, she filed a complaint with the International Court of Justice on behalf of groups representing victims of Israeli attacks during the 2008–2009 Gaza War.

Since 2011, she has been an expert for the United Nations Working Group on People of African Descent. She was the president of that UN Working Group from 2014 to 2016.

== Views ==
In an interview at the Council of Europe in 2020, Fanon Mendès-France called for a new Universal Declaration of Human Rights recast so as to no longer reflect a Eurocentric definition of human beings. She acted as board member of the Jewish French Union for Peace and expressed solidarity and support for State of Palestine.

== Family ==
Fanon Mendès-France is the daughter of the French political philosopher Frantz Fanon. She is a scholar of decolonisation and a member of the Frantz Fanon Foundation. She says that her father was "blacklisted" in France, where she finds it difficult to organize events in honor of his memory.

Fanon Mendès-France is the widow of Bernard Mendès-France, the son of the French politician Pierre Mendès France, who served as president of the Council of Ministers under the French Fourth Republic.
