= David Marriott =

British philosopher & poet (born 1963)

- Born: 1963 (age 62–63)

Education
- Education: University of Sussex (PhD)

Philosophical work
- Era: 21st-century philosophy
- Region: Western philosophy
- Institutions: Emory University
- Main interests: comparative literature, psychoanalysis, Black cultural theory, philosophies of race
- Notable ideas: Fanon's n'est pas

David Marriott (born 1963) is a British philosopher, poet and Charles T. Winship Professor of Philosophy at Emory University. He is known for his works on comparative literature, psychoanalysis, Black cultural theory and philosophies of race.

== Bibliography ==
=== Academic ===
- Of Effacement: Blackness and Non-Being (Standford UP, 2023)
- Lacan Noir: Lacan in Black Studies (Palgrave Lacan Series, 2020)
- Whither Fanon?: Studies in the Blackness of Being (Stanford University Press, Cultural Memory of the Present, 2018)
- Haunted Life: Visual Culture and Black Modernity (New Jersey, Rutgers University Press, 2007)
- On Black Men (Edinburgh and New York, Edinburgh University Press and Columbia University Press, 2000)

=== Creative ===
- Letters from the Black Ark (Omnidawn, 2023, forthcoming)
- Before Whiteness (City Lights, 2022)
- Duppies (Commune Editions, 2019)
- Duppies (London: London Materials, 2017)
- In-Neuter (Equipage: Cambridge, 2012)
- The Bloods (Exeter, Shearsman Books, 2011)
- Hoodoo Voodoo (London, Shearsman Books, 2008)
- Incognegro (Cambridge, Salt Publications, 2006)
