= Ecological evolutionary developmental biology =

Subfield of biology

Ecological evolutionary developmental biology (eco-evo-devo) is a field of biology combining ecology, developmental biology and evolutionary biology to examine their relationship. The concept is closely tied to multiple biological mechanisms. The effects of eco-evo-devo can be a result of developmental plasticity, the result of symbiotic relationships or epigenetically inherited. The overlap between developmental plasticity and symbioses rooted in evolutionary concepts defines ecological evolutionary developmental biology. Host-microorganism interactions during development characterize symbiotic relationships, whilst the spectrum of phenotypes rooted in canalization with response to environmental cues highlights plasticity. Developmental plasticity that is controlled by environmental temperature may put certain species at risk as a result of climate change.

== Phenotypic plasticity ==
Phenotypic or developmental plasticity is the alteration of development through environmental factors. These factors can induce multiple types of variants that increase the fitness of an organism based on the environment they are in. These alterations can be for defense, predation, sex determination, and sexual selection.

Plasticity-driven adaptation acts on evolution in three ways by phenotypic accommodation, genetic accommodation, and genetic assimilation. Phenotypic accommodation is when an organism adjusts its phenotype to better fit its environment without being genetically induced. The trait that is selected by the environment through phenotypic accommodation can then be integrated into the genome. This process is called genetic accommodation. Genetic accommodation allows for traits that were produced by the environment to be passed on, and it gives better responses to environmental changes. Lastly, genetic assimilation is when the induced phenotype is fixed into the genome. The trait is no longer environmentally induced. At this stage plasticity is lost because when the environmental stimulus is lost the phenotype still remains.

In some cases species change their environment to suit them. This phenomenon is called niche construction. These organisms can change unfavorable conditions to fit them. These changes relieve selective pressures to give an advantage they would have otherwise. These advantages could be creating shelters like nests and burrows, modifying the environment physically or chemically, or making shade.

== Epigenetic inheritance ==
Epigenetic inheritance is the phenomenon of inheritance of epigenetic marks on DNA, which are often induced by environmental factors. A simple example of this is permutation, which was first described in plants, where shapes or colors of seeds can alter a homologous allele. These marks alter gene expression patterns, which can then be transmitted to the next generation, creating a way by which environmental cues can influence the development of the organism's offspring.

Theories of epigenetic inheritance have their basis in theories such as that which was posited by French scientist Jean-Baptiste Lamarck, otherwise known as Lamarckian inheritance. Lamarck stated that an organism can pass physical characteristics that a parent organism acquired through use or disuse during its lifetime on to its offspring. This is now known to be an incomplete and inaccurate theory, as DNA sequences are highly conserved and do not change (other than mutation) throughout an individual's lifetime. Individuals also may carry many traits or genes that they don't use at different loci. However, epigenetic inheritance, like environmental factors such as temperature, or food availability, during the parent's life, can impact developmental patterns within offspring. An example of this is nutrition during childhood: poor nutrition has been shown to hinder appropriate pubertal development in human adolescents.

This can also force some genes that were previously inactivated and silenced, such as those in heterochromatin, to become activated in euchromatin, and vice versa. The field of ecological evolutionary developmental biology aims to assess how broader ecological factors and environmental stressors, such as malnutrition and temperature in one organism, can affect the following generations of that organism, and what broader role epigenetic inheritance has on evolutionary trends.

== Symbiotic interactions ==
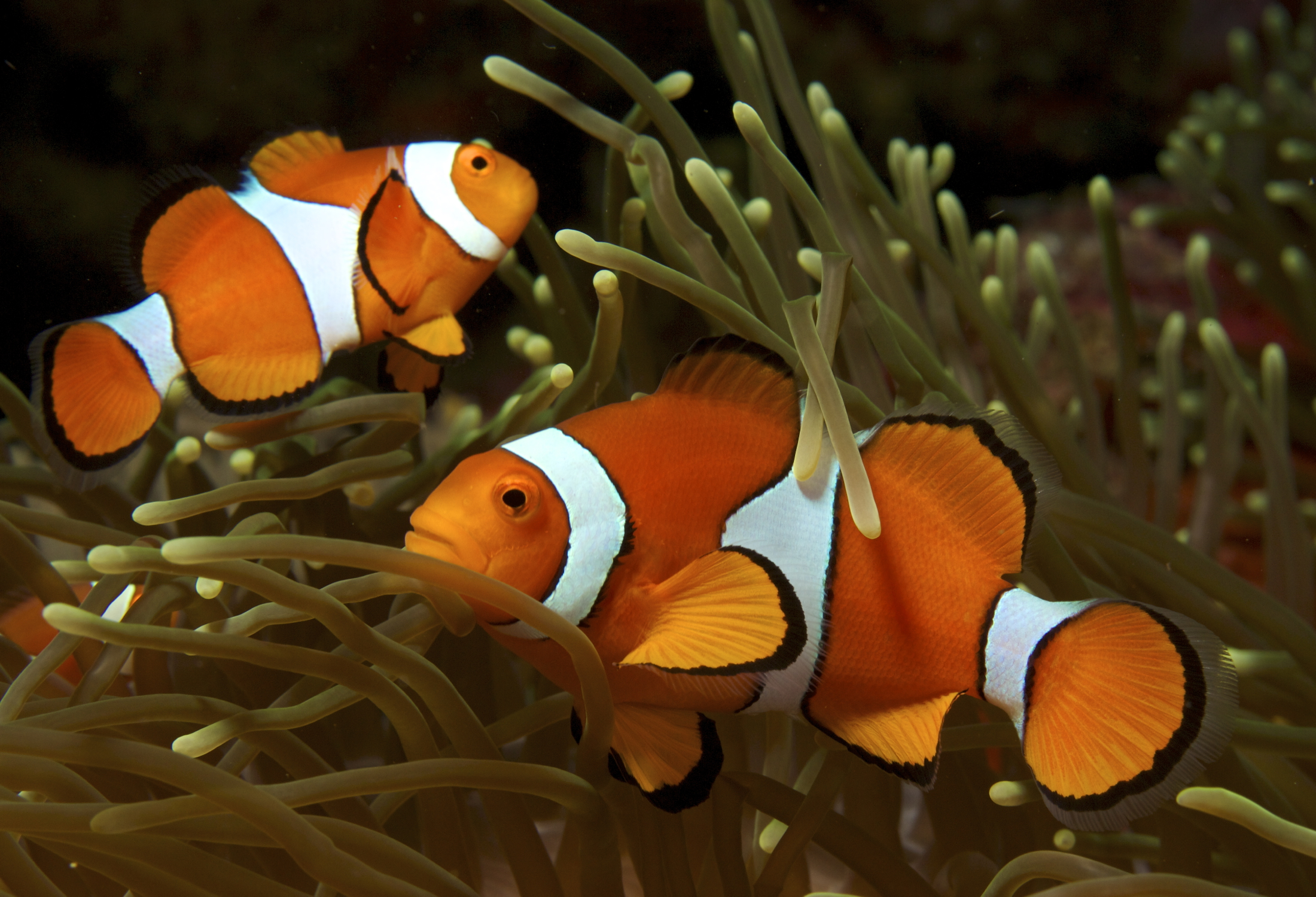
Clownfish and sea anemones exhibit mutualistic, commensal relationships, including those that affect their microbiomes.

Symbiosis describes the relationship between two species living closely together in an environment, and symbiotic interactions are significant influences on eco-evo-devo dynamics. Many symbiotic organisms have co-evolved and, over time, have become reliant on these relationships. The effect on either involved organism may be positive, neutral, or negative, and these effects are used to broadly categorize different types of symbiotic relationships. Symbiotic relationships generally fall into the categories of mutualism, commensalism, parasitism/predation, amensalism, or competition, although other categorizations may be used to describe more complex or uncommon interactions. The relationship between clownfish and anemones is one example of a mutualistic symbiosis. Mutualisms are particularly common between ectotherms, making these symbiotic relationships some of the most threatened by climate change.

=== Symbiosis and quantitative genetics ===
As it relates to the field at large, emergent research aims to ascertain the means by which these mutualistic and symbiotic relationships are influenced by broader ecological trends, and to which degree development is influenced by these symbioses. Through quantitative genetics, we understand that the overall phenotypic variance V_{P} is determined by the confluence of genetic and environmental variance, and can be related via the following equation:

V_{P} = V_{G} + V_{E}

It is well known that environmental factors affect phenotypic expression via polyphenism. Emerging research in ecological evolutionary developmental biology aims to seek out how exactly symbiotic and mutualistic relationships between species also plays a role and to what degree, such as the ability of microbiota to induce polyphenism during development, which has been studied in ciliates such as Zoothamnium niveum.

=== Ecology and the holobiont ===
As an interdisciplinary field, ecological evolutionary developmental biology also aims to seek out and study interactions between organisms that occupy part of a broader holobiont. It is now widely known that many organisms, especially large, multicellular organisms such as humans, exist within the continuum of a variety of host-microbiota interactions. For instance, it is now known that commensal interactions between different species, such as that of clownfish and sea anemones, is now modulated by various bacteria that are present on and within both organisms. Interactions such as these can be modulated by broader ecological trends within ecosystems, which can vary the quantity and quality of microbiota, directly affecting the health of the host, as well as influencing trends in organismal development and evolution at-large. Ecological evolutionary developmental biology aims to study these interactions in the context of the holobiont, addressing the interplay between epigenetics, environment, symbiosis, and host-microbial interactions in a more systematized manner.

== Climate change ==
Climate change may alter the development of organisms. As a type of developmental plasticity, the sex determination of particular animals can be influenced by the temperature of the environment. Some Reptiles and ray-finned fish rely on temperature-dependent sex determination (TSD). The determination takes place during a specific period of the embryonic development. Although the exact mechanisms of this type of sex determination remains unknown for most species, temperature sensitive proteins that determine the sex of alligators have been found. The effects of rising temperatures can already be seen in animals, for example the green sea turtle. Sea turtles produce more females when exposed to higher temperatures. As a result, adult green turtle populations are currently 65% female on cooler beaches, but can reach 85% on their warmer nesting beaches. In contrast to the rising female proportion of sea turtles, the fish that use TSD, such as the southern flounder, generally produce more males in response to higher temperatures. Species that are strongly influenced by temperature in their sex determination may be particularly at risk from climate change. From an evolutionary standpoint, sea turtles' sex chromosomes differ from other species of reptiles, and this difference makes them susceptible to TSD. Researchers believe this phenomenon is worth studying as climate change may one day have an effect on other types of vertebrates.

Rising global temperatures may decrease the amount of genetic variation, hurting specific species' chance at survival. Having a large gene pool is crucial when it comes to being able to adapt to environmental conditions and disease. Climate change can lower the amount of genetic diversity in a population over time and is extremely detrimental to the overall fitness of individuals in a given population.

Climate change affects more than just animals when it comes to development. It affects people as well, especially those in developing countries. For example, expecting mothers who are in areas where droughts are more common due to climate change, may suffer from dehydration which can have harmful effects on their child's development. Dehydration can cause amniotic fluid levels to be lower, which directly correlates to the baby's development and can even cause premature birth. Malnutrition in children is a huge problem in developing countries. Rising global temperatures can alter growing seasons for certain food groups, making it hard for children to get the proper nutrients they need for ideal human development.

Ecological, evolutionary, developmental biology compares these subgenres of biology. Interaction between organisms and the environment is very important. Climate change intensely alters these interactions and is cause for concern in regard to the overall well-being of our ecological landscape. Climate change affects humans, animals, plants, and bacteria and their symbiotic relationships with each other drastically. It is important for scientists, researchers, and people around the world to work together to find the best strategy to preserve biological diversity and to slow down the rising global temperatures and the effects of climate change.

== See also ==
- Climate change mitigation
