= Phylogeny (psychoanalysis) =

Psychoanalysis of the whole family

Phylogeny in psychoanalysis is the study of the whole family or species of an organism in order to better understand the pre-history of it. It might have an unconscious influence on a patient, according to Sigmund Freud. After the possibilities of ontogeny, which is the development of the whole organism viewed from the light of occurrences during the course of its life, have been exhausted, phylogeny might shed more light on the pre-history of an organism.

The term phylogeny derives from the Greek terms phyle (φυλή) and phylon (φῦλον), denoting “tribe” and “race”; and the term genetikos (γενετικός), denoting “relative to birth”, from genesis (γένεσις) “origin” and “birth”. Phylogenetics (/ˌfaɪloʊdʒɪˈnɛtɪks, -lə-/) is the study of evolutionary relatedness among groups of organisms (e.g. species, populations), In biology this is discovered through molecular sequencing data and morphological data matrices (phylogenetics), while in psychoanalysis this is discovered by analysis of the memories of a patient and the relatives.

== See also ==
- Ontogeny (psychoanalysis)
- Ontogeny
- Phylogenetics
