= Georges Robert (admiral) =

French sailor and administrator (1875-1965)

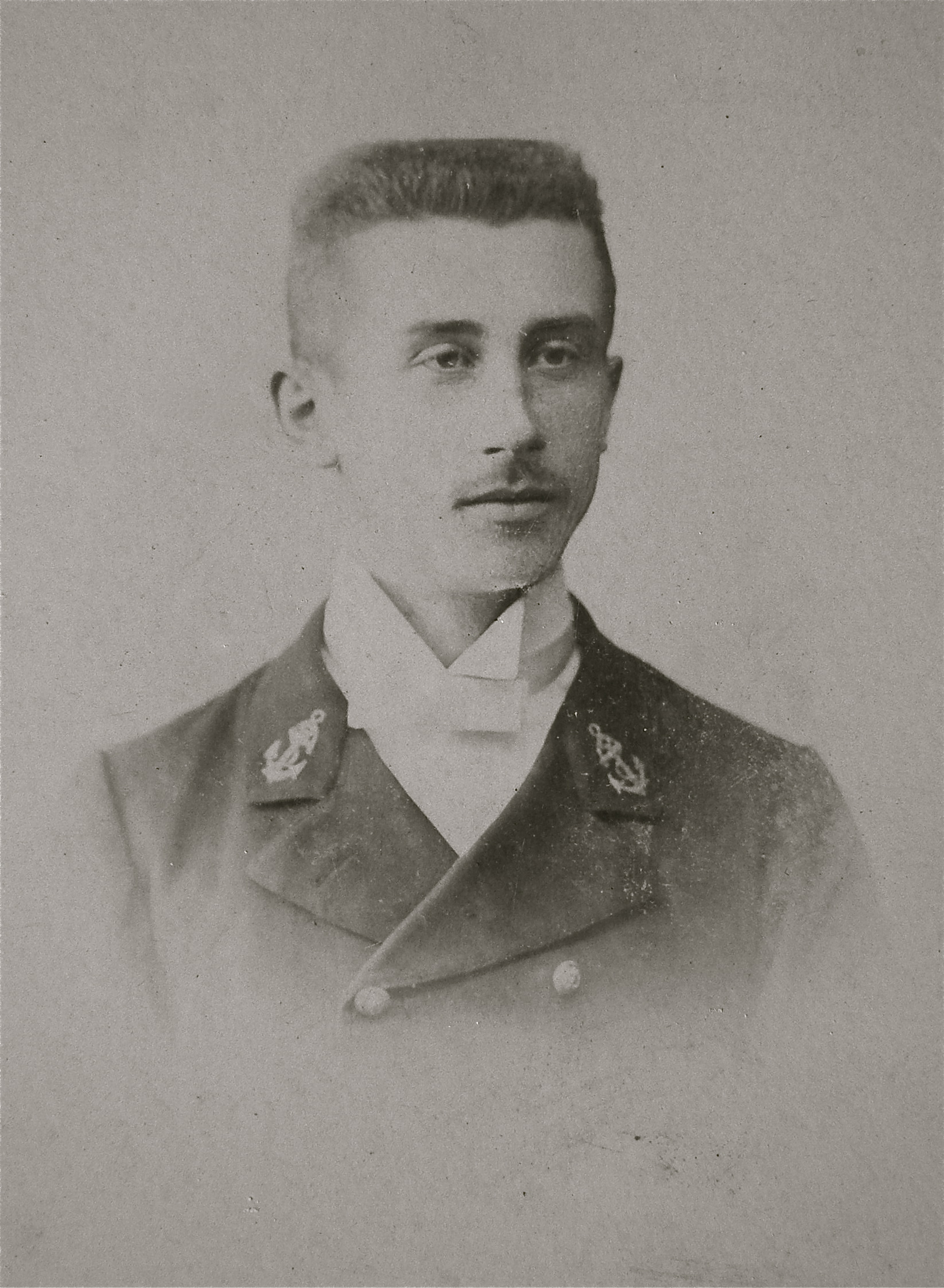
- Georges Robert in 1893
- Born: Georges Achille Marie Joseph Robert; 31 January 1875; Courseulles, French Third Republic
- Died: 2 March 1965 (aged 90); Paris, France
- Military career
- Allegiance: French Third Republic; Vichy France
- Branch: French Navy
- Rank: Admiral
- Commands: Commander in Chief of the Western Atlantic Theatre
- Known for: High commissioner to Martinique, Guadeloupe and French Guiana 1939-1943
- Awards: Grand Cross of the Legion of Honour; Order of the Francisque

Georges Robert (French pronunciation: [ʒɔʁʒ ʁɔbɛʁ]) was an officer of the French Navy, as well as a civil administrator. He ended his military career with the rank of admiral. He is mainly known for his role as High Commissioner of the Vichy regime for the French overseas territories of the Western Atlantic (French West Indies, Guiana, and Saint Pierre and Miquelon).

He was born in Courseulles on 31 January 1875, and died in Paris on 2 March 1965.

== Biography ==
=== Family and education ===
Georges Robert came from a family of manufacturers, who produced high-quality, hand-made lace. In 1893, at the age of eighteen, he entered the École navale, after studying at the Institution Saint-Joseph in Caen, then at the Naval College in Cherbourg. Georges Robert was appointed ensign in 1900 and took part in an eighteen-month campaign in Madagascar.

=== First World War ===
In 1915, as a lieutenant, he commanded the submarine Phoque, then the destroyer Mameluk. He took part in the naval operations in the Dardanelles campaign, where he was involved in rescuing the shipwrecked crew of the state transport Admiral Hamelin. After graduating from the École de guerre navale, he became a frigate captain in 1916 and commanded the torpedo boat Commandant Rivière. Then he commanded the torpedo boat Casque.

=== Between the wars ===
He was promoted to captain in 1921, rear admiral in 1926, vice admiral in 1930, and was appointed inspector general of maritime forces in the Mediterranean in 1932. He was awarded the Grand Cross of the Legion of Honour in 1936. In 1937, the year he reached the age of retirement, he was admitted to the 2nd section with the rank of admiral.

=== Second World War ===
At his own request, Robert was recalled to active duty by the Minister of Colonies, Georges Mandel, on 7 June 1939, sailing from Brest on the cruiser Jeanne d'Arc on 1 September 1939. Arriving in Fort-de-France a fortnight later, on 15 September he took up the political role of High Commissioner of France in the West Indies, Saint-Pierre-et-Miquelon, and Guiana. He had at his disposal the cruisers Émile Bertin and Jeanne d'Arc; the aircraft carrier Béarn (which carried 104 aircraft bought by France from the United States before the Armistice, diverted while en route from Canada to France); the auxiliary cruisers Barfleur and Quercy; the oil tanker Var; the aviso Ville-d'Ys; and finally a large garrison in Martinique. After the Armistice, rather than the pre-war aim of establishing a Western Atlantic theatre of operations, Robert's men were to ensure the protection of a stock of 286 tons of gold from the Bank of France, intended as payment for the war materiel purchased in the United States.

Robert refused to recognize the resolutions, of 14 June 1940, made in support of Free France by the General Councils of Martinique and Guadeloupe, taking the view that external pressure was being exerted on those legislatures. The General Councils requested the transfer of power to them by application of article 1 of the law of 15 February 1872. In Guadeloupe, the socialist politician Paul Valentino denounced the Vichy regime, and with a small group of followers went to the governor's residence to demand that rule be transferred to the Council; the governor, Constant Sorin, refused to receive them. In Martinique, Victor Sévère, then the deputy mayor of Fort-de-France, resigned, expressing his opposition. However, Robert had received a High Commissioner's powers from Vichy France, which gave him authority over the existing colonial framework in the French Caribbean. Backed by the fleet, he quickly established authority over the islands' governors, then dissolved the General Councils. In Martinique, the Council was replaced with appointees from the small white population on the island.

During the period of hostilities, Robert organised the defence of maritime communications in liaison with his British counterpart in Bermuda. In his memoire, La France aux Antilles 1939-1943, Robert argued that his support for Vichy was essential, as he had "an overriding obligation to safeguard the national sovereignty, as represented by the home government, in legal succession to the Third Republic in a period of alarming crisis". His administration made use of censorship from the start, as he stated: "The High Commissioner will inform, not be informed. My aim is to ensure complete cooperation by means of informing public opinion according to the directives of ... [Marshal Petain]". In March and April 1941, the police examined 15,767 personal letters. Suzanne Césaire ran afoul of the regime's pre-publication censorship when applying for a paper ration to print Tropiques; she could only reestablish publication after 1943. Vichy's Jewish statute was enacted and enforced; in Fort-de-France, the number of people who registered as required was sixteen. However, in Martinique some French Jews were able to find refuge from deportation for a short period, through the work of Varian Fry's Emergency Rescue Committee.

=== High Commissioner for the West Atlantic Theatre (1939-1943) ===
The United States having recognised the Vichy government, Admiral Robert negotiated with that country. In return for a guarantee of his neutrality, he obtained necessary supplies. When the United States entered the war in December 1941, Robert confirmed past commitments to Frederick Horne, U.S. Vice-Chief of American Naval Operations. Horne confided that he was preparing an important landing in Morocco at the end of October 1942. The French Admiralty received this information via emissary on 17 April 1942. In April 1943, the United States suspended supplies to the West Indies. In the resulting crisis, Vichy, which no longer had diplomatic relations with Washington, ordered the ships and gold scuttled. "He (Admiral Robert) was able to make Vichy believe that all the aircraft had been destroyed". In the same vein, he used subterfuge to save the ships, pretending to scuttle them while maintaining his neutrality.

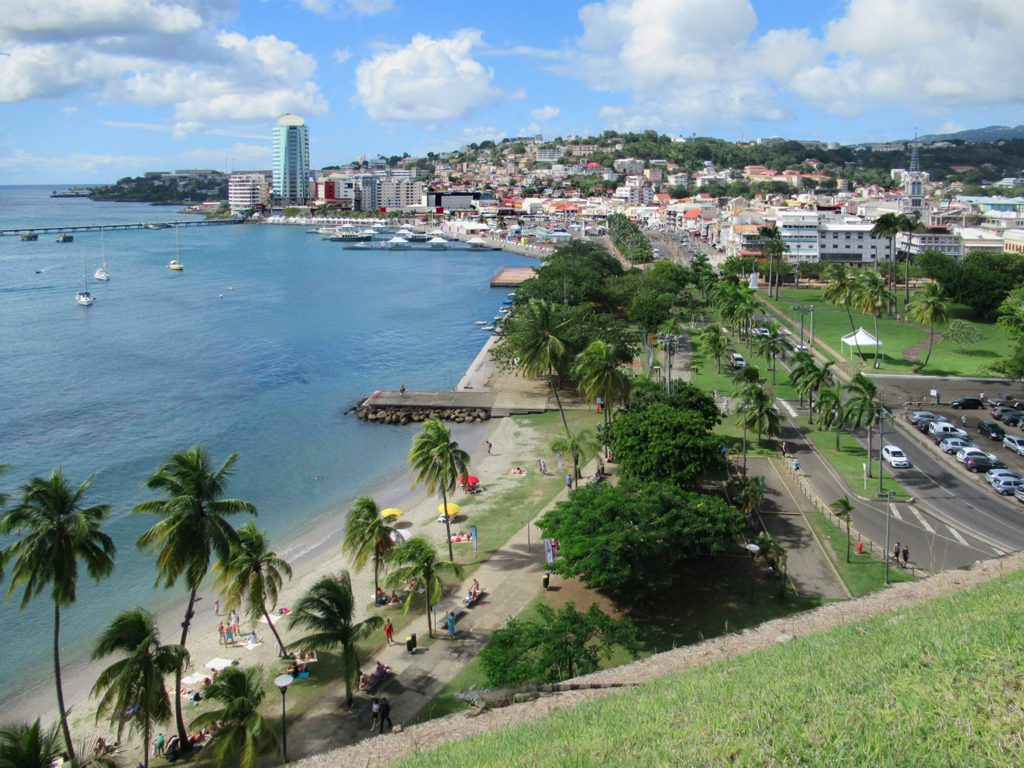
Place de la Savane, Fort de France

From April 1943, there was an uprising of the population against the Vichy administration. Firstly, there was the creation of the Martinique Committee for National Liberation (CMLN), led by Victor Sévère and Emmanuel Rimbaud. On 24 June, a crowd organised by the Martinique Committee for National Liberation gathered in Fort-de-France to cry, "Vive la France, Vive de Gaulle". The Committee appointed the diplomat Henri Hoppenot. After French Guiana rallied to Free France in March 1943, an insurrection broke out on 24 June in front of the Fort-de-France war memorial. On 29 June, the garrison of the Balata camp (a suburb of Fort-de-France) joined the dissidents under the orders of Commandant Henri Tourtet. Robert withdrew to the cruiser Émile Bertin, which was being repaired in dry dock at the Radoub basin in Fort-de-France. He refused to give in for several days of negotiations with dissident leaders and representatives of the United States, but finally announced his departure on 30 June. Admiral Robert prepared for his successor as directed by the French Committee for National Liberation (CFLN) in Algiers. On 14 July, Henri Hoppenot – then ambassador of Free France in Washington – landed on the island, mandated by the CFLN. The next day, Admiral Robert handed over his powers to him, then left the island for the United States, via Puerto Rico, with some of his entourage.

Hoppenot ratified the rallying of the island to Free France. He also appointed a new governor, René Ponton, previously a colonial administrator and Free French officer in French Equatorial Africa. On his arrival in Fort-de-France, Hoppenot courteously explained that his predecessor "had maintained complete and inviolate French sovereignty over the West Indies for four years and that at the time of supreme decisions, resisting the repeated orders that Berlin had transmitted to him from Vichy, Admiral Robert had handed over an intact gold reserve and fleet to the French authorities". This thesis of the maintenance of French sovereignty and the conservation of gold is often put forward and is based on Robert's own memoirs. It does not excuse the fact that Robert did not back Free France because of his distrust in its local representatives, or because of his view of the importance of his mission to safeguard the assets of the Banque de France; or that Pétain received him in Vichy, in 1943.

=== Operation Asterisk ===
Operation Asterisk was an Allied plan to provoke an uprising on the island if Admiral Robert had refused to negotiate a neutral settlement after accepting the armistice.

=== Antillean and Guianese response and memory ===
Throughout this period West Indians and Guianese reproached Robert for ignoring local interests. They objected to his authoritarian stance and his handling of shortages, especially of food. An early decision to base about 5,000 sailors and infantrymen on Martinique affected the social and economic balance of the island. Local residents were also unconvinced by attempts to popularise Robert through public display of his image and use of Creole to hail him as "Li bon papa Pétain". Above all, they reproached him for his contempt of local politicians, for not having sided with General de Gaulle from the outset, his repression of dissidents, and his Catholic and bourgeois origins. Thousands of young men and women left the island on small boats to join the Free French on Dominica and Saint Lucia. Robert termed them dissidents. They had to brave strong Atlantic currents and possible betrayal by smugglers. Once they had arrived and made contact with the Free French, who were headquartered on Dominica, they would be found places to train and get other support from local representatives. Dissidents were trained in Fort Dix, Camp Edwards, and Camp Patrick Henry in the United States; they were formed into the 1st Antillean Marching Battalion, then sent to North Africa, as part of the 21st Antillean anti-aircraft group, which was later integrated into the 1st Free French Division. There is a memorial dedicated to the Free French in Roseau near the Neg Mawon Emancipation Monument. A plaque was also dedicated to the volunteers of Guadeloupe, Martinique, and Guiana at the Hôtel des Invalides in Paris in 2014.

Admiral Robert's administration is still remembered by Martinicans, especially older ones. The disruption of imports from Metropolitan France led to serious shortages, and in April 1943 the United States blockade worsened living conditions. Basic necessities such as flour, salted meat, soap, and cloth were unavailable for weeks at a time and had to be substituted with local products, even cutting petrol with rum to fuel cars. The harshness of this period has become a byword, evoked in Creole by saying "an tan Robè", that is, "in Robert's time". Guadeloupeans refer to the period as "tan Sorin", Governor Sorin's time. Although the number of people still living who remember the period is dwindling, it has inspired a number of prominent literary works from Antillean authors, including Mayotte Capécia's I Am a Martinican Woman, Raphaël Confiant's Le Nègre et l'Amiral, and, in Creole, Tony Delsham's An tan Robè.

=== Trial ===
In September 1944, Admiral Robert was accused of collaboration and imprisoned in Fresnes. Provisionally released on 24 March 1946, he appeared before the High Court of Justice on 14 March 1947. He was sentenced to ten years hard labour. Yet, the sentence was suspended at the request of the Court. The judges for his case noted that he had been favourable to the British, concluding a modus vivendi with them after Operation Catapult on 3 July 1940. He had maintained his neutrality during the occupation of Saint-Pierre and Miquelon by the Free French Naval Forces. They noted his obedience to Vichy was purely formal and maintained for local diplomatic and utilitarian purposes. Also, that the testimonies of the American authorities were complimentary and that he had challenged the procedure of swearing in the Head of State, Philippe Pétain, as being "superfluous and dangerous".

He walked out of court a free man. Six months later, his sentence was remitted. On 15 April 1954, he received total amnesty and was reinstated in his rank and title of admiral and was allowed to keep his decorations. He was acquitted in 1957.

== General de Gaulle's reproaches ==
In his Mémoires de guerre, de Gaulle wrote:

Since 1940, Admiral Robert, High Commissioner, kept these colonies [French West Indies and French Guiana] under the obedience of the Marshal. With the cruisers Émile Bertin and Jeanne d'Arc, the aircraft carrier Béarn, the auxiliary cruisers: Barfleur, Quercy (auxiliary cruiser), Estérel ... as well as a large garrison, he applied a strict regime and, in return for the guarantee of his neutrality, obtained the necessary supplies from the Americans. But as events unfolded, the population and many military elements expressed their desire to join those fighting the enemy.

At the beginning of 1943, everything announced that a great movement would soon draw the French territories of America and the forces there into the liberation camp.

In June, Martinique accomplished the decisive acts. For months, Admiral Robert had been receiving countless petitions from his constituents urging him to let this ardently French territory do its duty to France. I myself had found the opportunity to send the doctor general Le Dantec to Fort-de-France in April 1943 to offer Admiral Robert a satisfactory solution. But my efforts went unanswered. On the other hand, threats and sanctions were redoubled on the spot against the resistance fighters.

== Decorations ==
- Grand-croix de la Légion d'honneur
- Order of the Francisque

== Filmography ==
- 2015: Rose and the Soldier

== Bibliography ==
- Hervé Coutau-Bégarie, Claude Huan, Mers el-Kébir. La rupture franco-britannique, Paris, Economica, 1994.
- Jean-Baptiste Bruneau, La marine de Vichy aux Antilles, juin 1940-juillet 1943, Paris, Les Indes Savantes, 2014.
- Georges Robert, La France aux Antilles de 1939 à 1943, Paris, Plon, 1950, 228 pages.
- United States Department of State, Communications between Fort-de-France and Washington 1940–1943 (with a farewell message from Roosevelt to Admiral Robert).
- Journal de bord du contre-torpilleur Mameluck n° - / 1915 (20 August – 3 December 1915) – then commanded by Lieutenant Robert – (Extract; S.G.A. "Mémoire des hommes", Cote SS Y 336, p. num. 245).
- Tibéry, Denis Lefebvre et Jean-Pierre Pécau: L'Or de France (volume 1, "La croisière de l’Emile Bertin" and volume 2, "12 milliards sous les Tropiques"), Le Lombard, 2011 and 2012.
