= Gilles Devers =

French lawyer and academic (1956–2024)

Gilles Devers (1956 – 26 November 2024) was a French lawyer and academic.

In October 2007, he was part of a working group that produced a report for the Haute Autorité de santé on methods of improving cooperation between health professionals.

Together with Mireille Fanon Mendès-France, he filed a complaint with the International Court of Justice on behalf of groups representing victims of Israeli attacks during the 2008–2009 Gaza War.

He represented the Palestinian Authority before the International Criminal Court and Polisario front before the Court of Justice of the European Union.

Devers died on 26 November 2024, at the age of 68. He was posthumously awarded the Medal of Honor of International Solidarity of the Sahrawi Arab Democratic Republic in 2024.
