= Henri Tourtet =

French soldier (1899 to 1945)

- Born: July 21, 1899; Montélimar (Drôme)
- Died: April 15, 1945 Saint-Georges-de-Didonne (Charente-Maritime)
- Buried: Nécropole nationale de Retaud (Charente-Maritime)
- Allegiance: France; Vichy France (1940-1943); French Liberation Army (1943-1945)
- Branch: Infantry
- Service years: 1917-1945
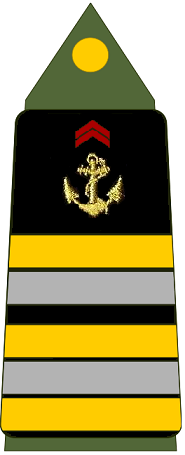
- Rank: Lieutenant-colonel (France)
- Awards: Officier de la Légion d'honneur Compagnon de la Libération; Croix de guerre 1914-1918; Croix de guerre 1939-1945; Croix de guerre des théâtres d'opérations extérieures

Henri Tourtet (Montélimar, 21 July 1899 - Mort pour la France Saint-Georges-de-Didonne 15 April 1945), was a French soldier and Companion of Liberation. After serving in the First World War, he pursued his military career in Africa, taking part in the Rif War.

During the Second World War, after taking part in the Battle of France, his sympathy for Gaullism led to him being placed under surveillance by the French state and sent to Martinique to perform lower-ranking tasks. However, he led a revolt that contributed to the island's rallying to Free France. On his return to metropolitan France at the head of a battalion he had created, he was killed during the fighting to reduce the Royan pocket.

== Biography ==
=== Youth and education ===
Henri Tourtet was born on 21 July 1899 in Montélimar, in the Drôme region of France. The son of an officer, he spent his schooling at the Ecole des Enfants de Troupe in Montreuil, Pas-de-Calais.

=== First world war ===
His father and elder brother were killed on the front in 1916. He decided to enlist and was assigned to the 23rd Infantry Regiment in March 1917. Taking part in the battles of the Chemin des Dames and the Aisne, he was promoted corporal in January 1918 and sergeant the following month. On 18 July of the same year, he was shot at Ancienville.

=== Between the world wars ===
In 1920, he was promoted to second lieutenant after attending École de l'infanterie at Saint-Maixent. Assigned to the 6th Colonial Infantry Regiment, he left for French Equatorial Africa and was transferred in 1922 to the 14th Senegalese Tirailleurs Regiment, then to the Senegalese Tirailleurs Regiment in Chad.

In 1925, he was posted to the 13th Regiment of Senegalese Tirailleurs (13th RTS) and took part in the Rif War, where he distinguished himself at the head of his platoon. He subsequently joined the 7th Senegalese Rifle Regiment, then the 13th Senegalese Rifle Regiment, before travelling through Algeria, Senegal and Guinea. He was promoted to captain in June 1931 and returned to France in 1938 when he was transferred to the 1st Marine Infantry Regiment.

=== Second world war ===
The following year, he served in the 57th Colonial Infantry Regiment at the outbreak of the Second World War. He took part in the Battle of France and was wounded by shrapnel on 11 June 1940 at Versigny. However, he refused to be evacuated and even replaced his battalion commander who had been killed in action. After the Armistice of 22 June 1940, he was posted to Fréjus but had difficulty accepting the installation of the Vichy regime. Refusing to swear an oath to Marshal Pétain, his insubordination led to him being transferred to Martinique, where he worked as a deputy examining magistrate at the Fort-de-France military court. Promoted to battalion commander in September 1941, he was sent to French Guiana in December, but was recalled the following month to Fort-de-France on the orders of Admiral Robert, High commissioner to Martinique, Guadeloupe and French Guiana, and supporter of the Vichy regime, who was keen to keep an eye on the Gaullist Tourtet.

He then spent almost two years without a command and occupied with low-level duties. However, Martinique's pro-Gaullist population was less and less inclined to tolerate the rule of the Vichy authorities and set up a Liberation Committee on 18 June 1943. On 27 June, in Balata (a military camp on the outskirts of Fort de France), a company of soldiers mutinied and claimed Commandant Tourtet as their leader. He decided to lead the mutineers, with whom he seized Fort Desaix and announced by radio that the island was joining the French army. Admiral Robert's troops surrendered without a fight and a few days later, Henri Hoppenot, representative of the French Committee of National Liberation, became governor of the island.

Promoted to lieutenant-colonel in December 1943, Henri Tourtet trained and commanded the 5th West Indian March Battalion (BMA5). Commanding this unit, he left for North Africa before returning to mainland France, where he took part in the fighting to liberate France. In April 1945, the BMA5 was present on the Atlantic coast where it was involved in the operations to reduce the Royan pocket. On 15 April, he received orders to take the village of Saint-Georges-de-Didonne within two days, and completed his task in just a few hours. While he was inspecting the area and heading out of the village to observe the German lines, he was killed by a burst of machine-gun fire. He is buried at the Rétaud national necropolis.

== Awards ==

Officier de la Légion d'honneur	Compagnon de la Libération	Croix de guerre 1914-1918
Croix de guerre 1939-1945	Croix de guerre des théâtres d'opérations extérieures	Resistance Medal; With rosette
Croix du combattant volontaire	Croix du combattant	Médaille coloniale
1914–1918 Inter-Allied Victory medal	Médaille commémorative de la guerre 1914-1918	Commemorative medal for voluntary service in Free France
Medalla de la Paz de Marruecos (Spain)		Chevalier de l'Ordre de l'Étoile noire (Benin)

== Memorials ==
- In Montélimar and Le Vésinet, his name is inscribed on the local war memorials.
- In Saint-Georges-de-Didonne, an avenue has been named in his honour. At the entrance to the latter, his name appears on the stele commemorating the liberation of April 1945.
- In Fort-de-France, at the Balata-Tourtet camp.

== Writing ==
His account of the Balata camp mutiny.

- Tourtet, Henri-Désiré (1899-1945) Troupe du groupe des Antilles. Rapport du chef de bataillon Tourtet,... au sujet des événements qui ont accompagné le ralliement de la Martinique aux Forces de l'Empire français.

== See also ==
- Henri Tourtet biography on the website of the Museum of the Order of Liberation.

== Bibliography ==
- Notin, Jean-Christophe (2000). 1061 compagnons (in French). Éditions Perrin. p. 822. ISBN 9782262016067.
- Trouplin, Vladimir (2010). Dictionnaire des Compagnons de la Libération (in French). Elytis. p. 1230. ISBN 9782356390332.
- Marcot, François (2006). Dictionnaire historique de la résistance (in French). Robert Laffont. ISBN 9782221099971.
- Marcot, François (1961). Mémorial des Compagnons 1940-1945 (in French). Imprimerie nationale. ISBN 9782221099971.
