= Gwarimpa Estate =

Housing estate in Abuja, Nigeria

Gwarimpa Estate is a developed district situated in Phase 3, in the capital city of Nigeria, Abuja. It is the largest single housing estate in Nigeria and in West Africa. The mega housing estate consist of some of the most elegant architectural designs with good roads networks and expensive houses.

== History ==
The history of the housing estate dates back to the administration of late General Sani Abacha, when it was built. The estate since then has experience a rapid development and influx population growth.

== Geography ==
Gwarimpa lies on an expanse land measuring about 1,090 hectares (117,000,000 sq ft) with seven residential areas, with seven residential areas demarcated by large avenues. Gwarimpa is adjacent to Katampe and Jahi to the north east, Kado to the east, Jabi to the south east and Life Camp to the south. While to the west and north west are Karsana and Dawaki & Kubwa respectively.

Major roads in the estate include Murtala Mohammed Expressway from the northern edge of the district and Ahmadu Bello Way to the southern part. There is another Ring Road 2 which links Gwarimpa to outskirt cities of Abuja such as Galadimawa.

Prominent hotels in the housing estate include among others; Benysta Hotel Grarimpa, House 12 Studios and Suites, Blue Palazzo Hotel, Cuzzi, Sefcon Suites and Apartments, Starview Palace Hotel, Trafford Hotel, 2/4 Apartment, Purple Tulip Hotel, Frankeys Haven Suite and Sumed Suite Annex.
