= Carnot high school Tunis =

School in Tunis, Tunisia

Lycée Carnot de Tunis
- معهد كارنو
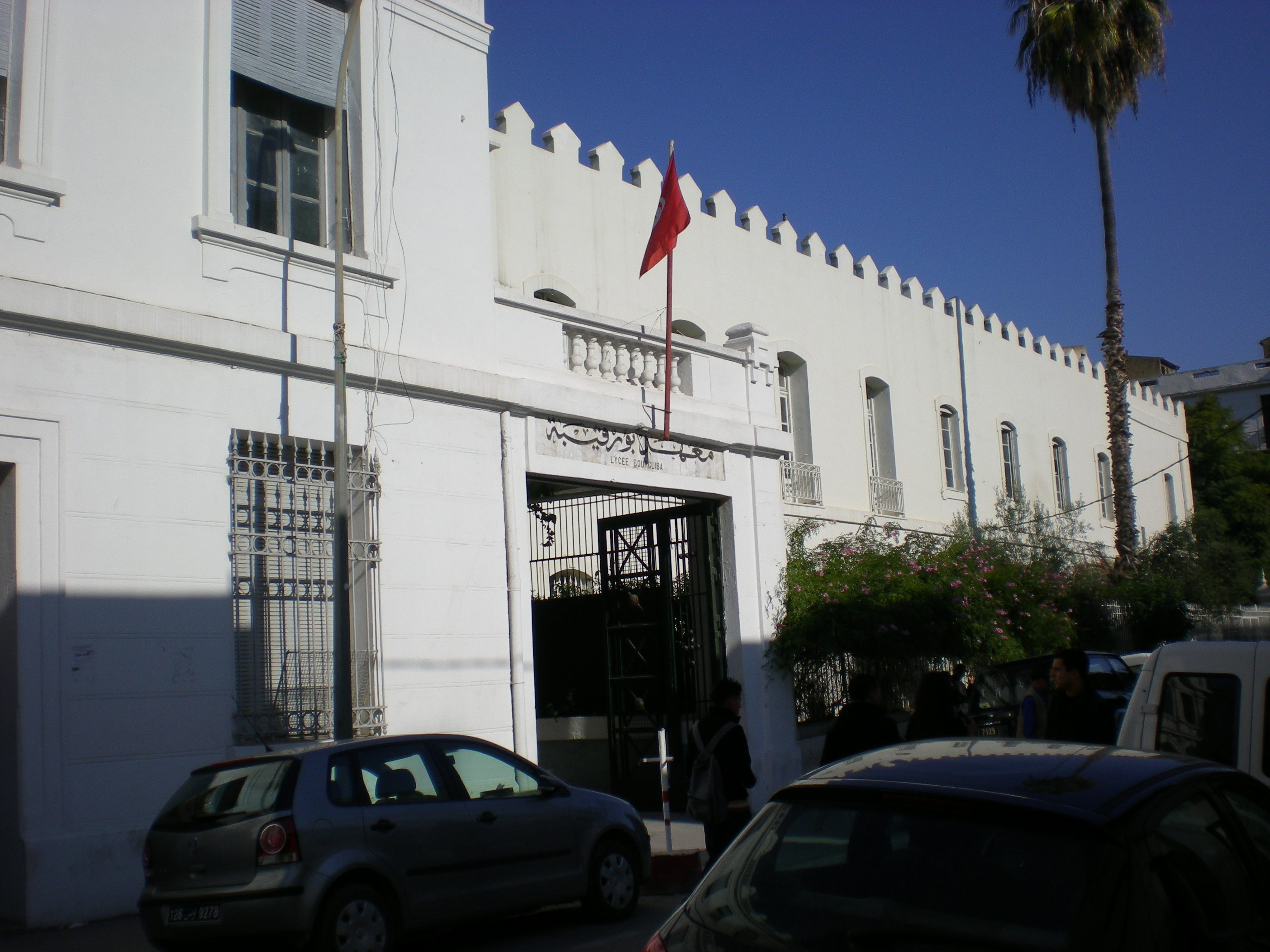

Location
- Tunis, Tunisia; 36.8023°N 10.1792°E

Information
- Other name: Lycée pilote Bourguiba de Tunis
- Former name: Saint-Charles College
- Established: 9 October 1882

Lycée Carnot de Tunis (Arabic: معهد كارنو, English: /kɑːrˈnoʊ/ kar-NOH) or Lycée pilote Bourguiba de Tunis (French: Lycée pilote Bourguiba de Tunis; Arabic: معهد بورقيبة النموذجي بتونس) formerly known as Collège Saint-Charles (French: Collège Saint-Charles), it is a secondary school that opened on October 9, 1882, on Avenue Habib Thamer in Tunis.

Since 1983, the building has housed a typical high school, an establishment of the educational system in Tunisia bearing the name of former President Habib Bourguiba, himself a former student of the establishment.

== History ==
Lycée Carnot de Tunis is the heir to a struggle for influence between Italian schools and French schools, but also between religious congregations and republican institutions.

In 1845, Abbot Bourgade, chaplain of the Chapelle Saint-Louis de Carthage, created the first French college, the Saint-Louis college, located in the medina of Tunis. After thirteen years of existence, the college closed its doors. In 1875, Cardinal Charles Lavigerie decided to inaugurate a college in Carthage bearing the same name as the previous one. The day after the establishment of the French protectorate of Tunisia in 1881, it was decided to transfer the establishment to the capital. Étienne-Marius Arnoux, engineer-architect, is responsible for building the high school, on the model of the high schools in metropolitan France, on the edge of the current avenue de Paris. Its opening took place on October 9, 1882, in the new renowned Saint-Charles College establishment.

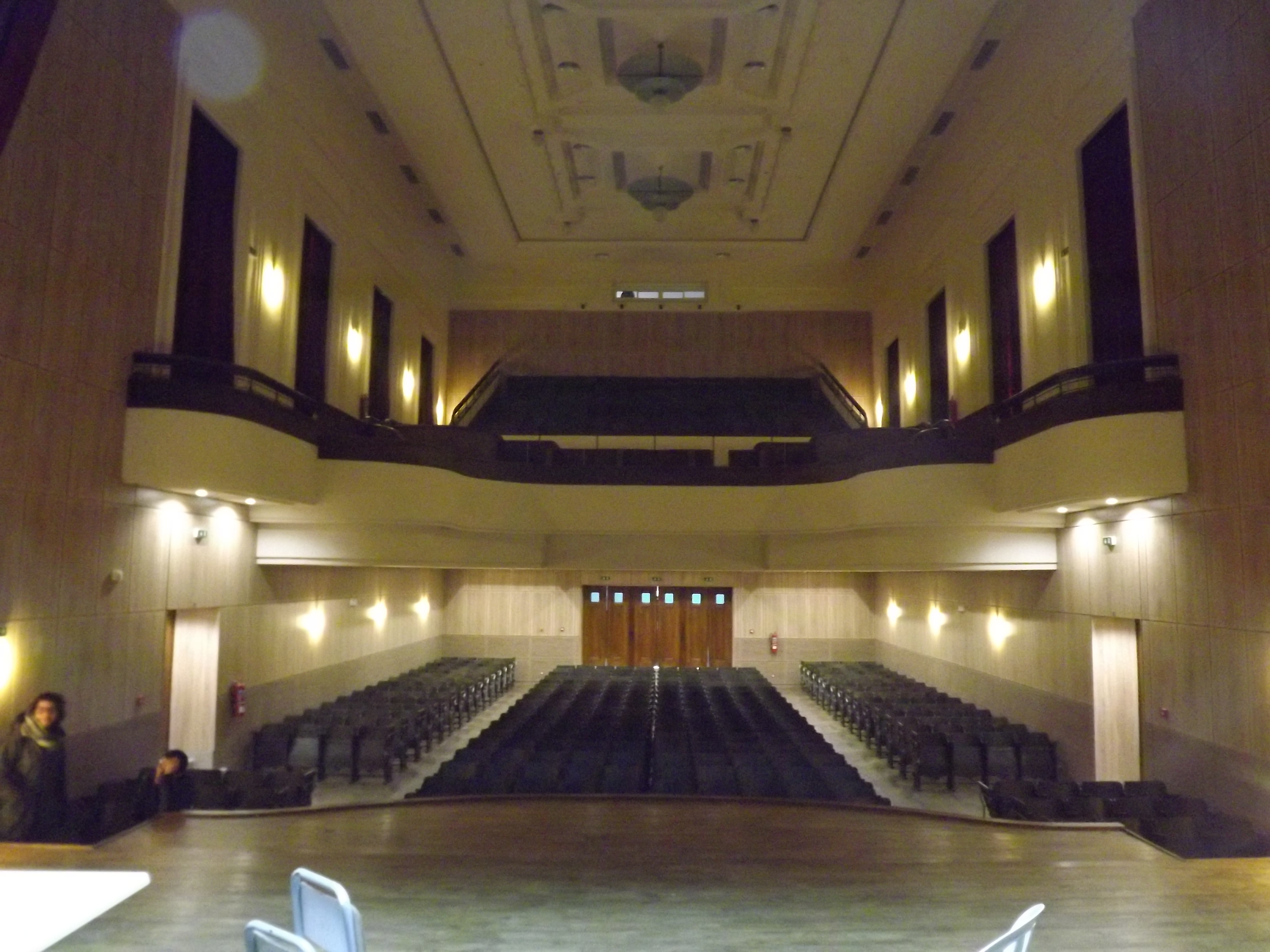
Theater of Lycée Carnot de Tunis

On November 2, 1889, the clergy ceded the Saint-Charles college to the French administration, which transformed it into a high school under the name of Sadiki high school in homage to Muhammad III as-Sadiq. To avoid confusion with the Sadiki College, it took the name of Lycée de Tunis by virtue of the beylical decree of September 29, 1893. In 1894, the Council of Ministers gave it the name of Sadi Carnot to honor the assassinated President of the French Republic. Due to the increasing number of schoolchildren, the buildings were enlarged in 1894, 1913, 1925 and 1939. During the Second World War, the school was requisitioned first by the Kommandantur of the German army Wehrmacht and then, in 1943, by Allied forces. During this period, the students are disseminated in the other establishments of Tunis.

In 1961, due to the Bizerte crisis, the start of the new school year did not take place until the first half of November in French establishments. To cope with the increase in staff, annexes were built in Carthage, Salammbô, Mutuelleville (1956) and La Marsa (1960).

== Notable staff and alumni ==
=== Professors ===
- Jean Amrouche (letters)
- Jean Anglade (Italian)
- Alain Besançon
- François Châtelet (philosophy)
- Claude Hagège (letters)
- Rachel Hautot (sculpture)
- Albert Memmi (philosophy)
- Hubert Monteilhet (history-geography)
- Olivier Reboul
- Paul Sebag (letters)
- Raoul Versi
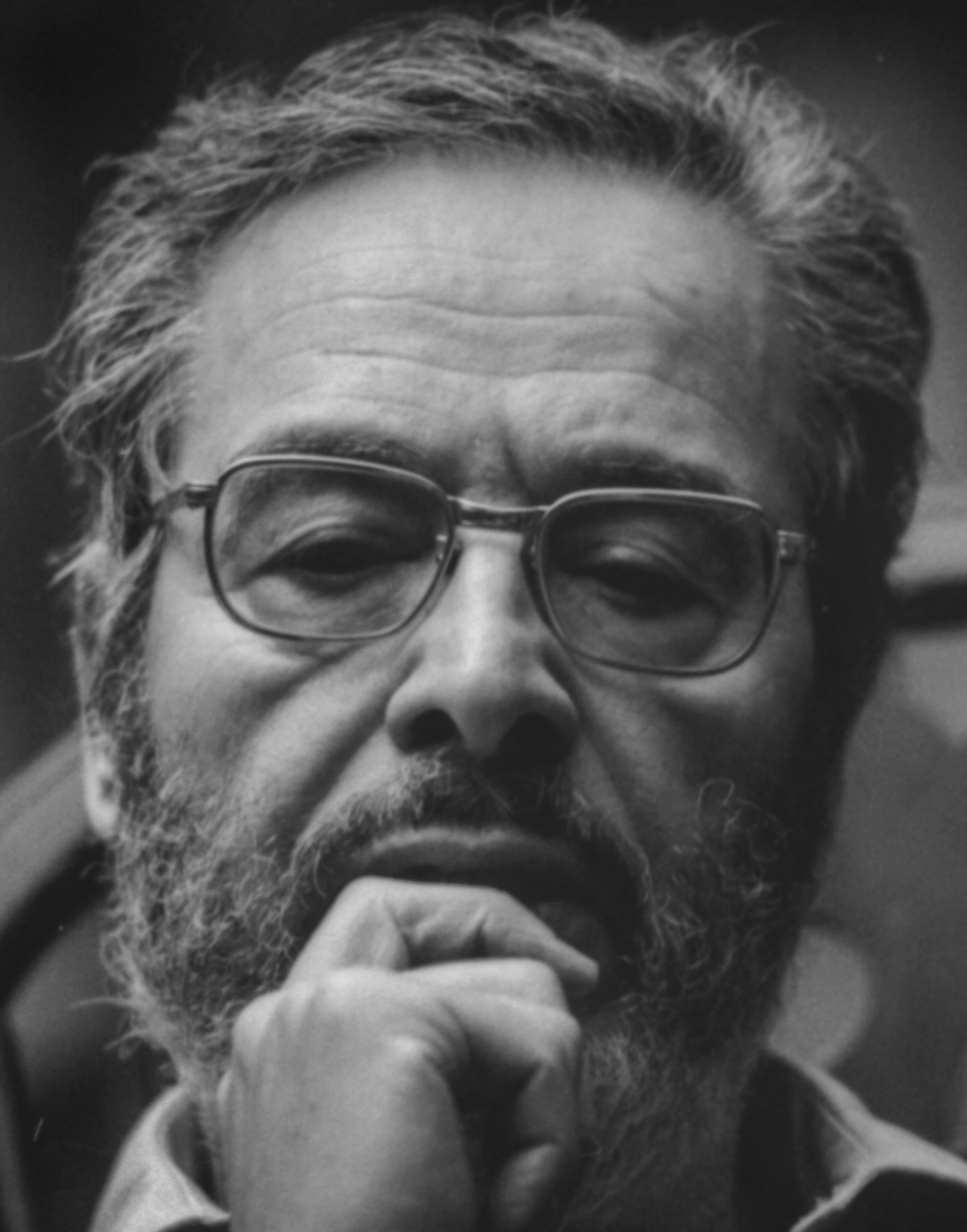
Albert Memmi

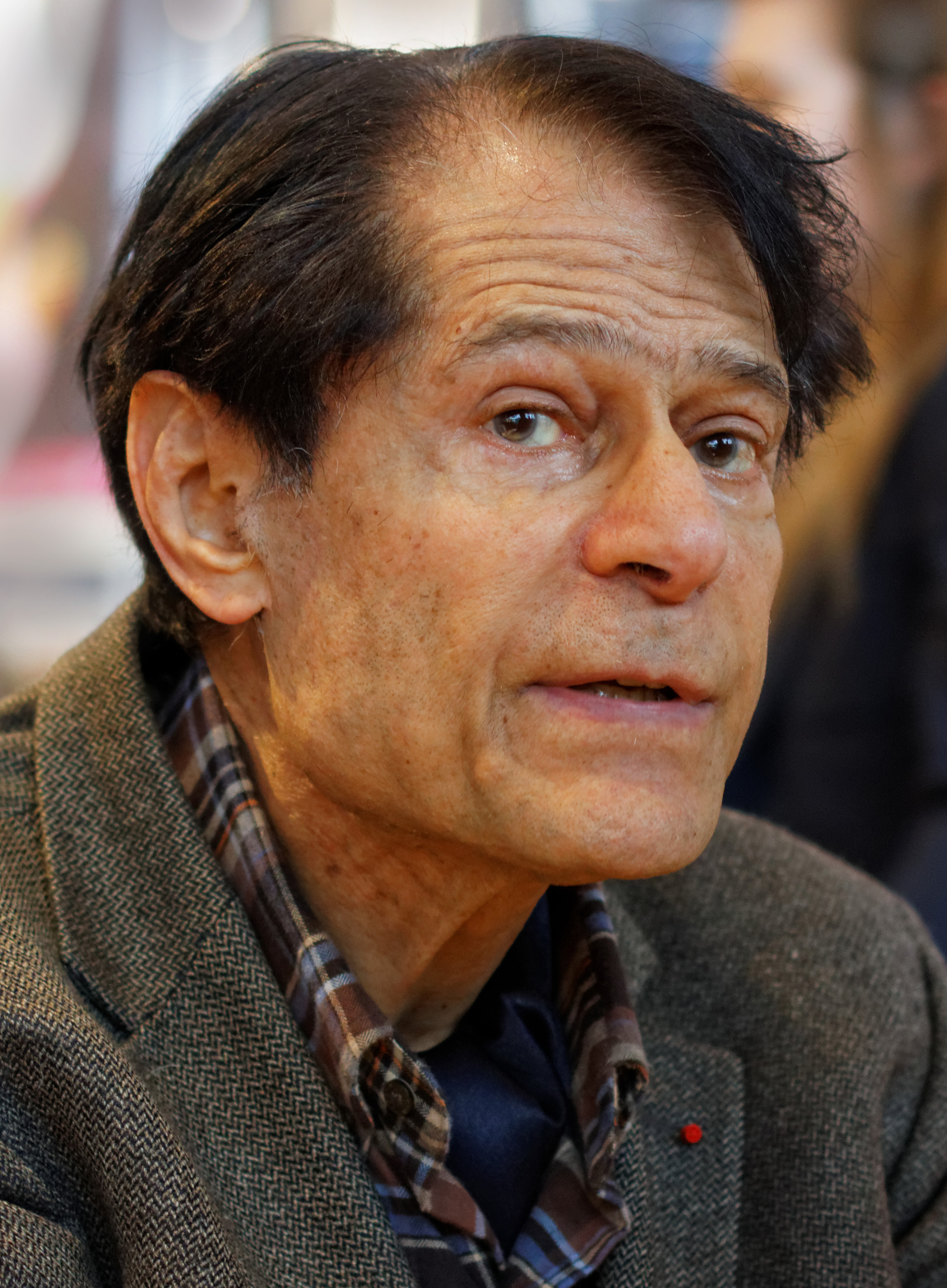
Claude Hagège

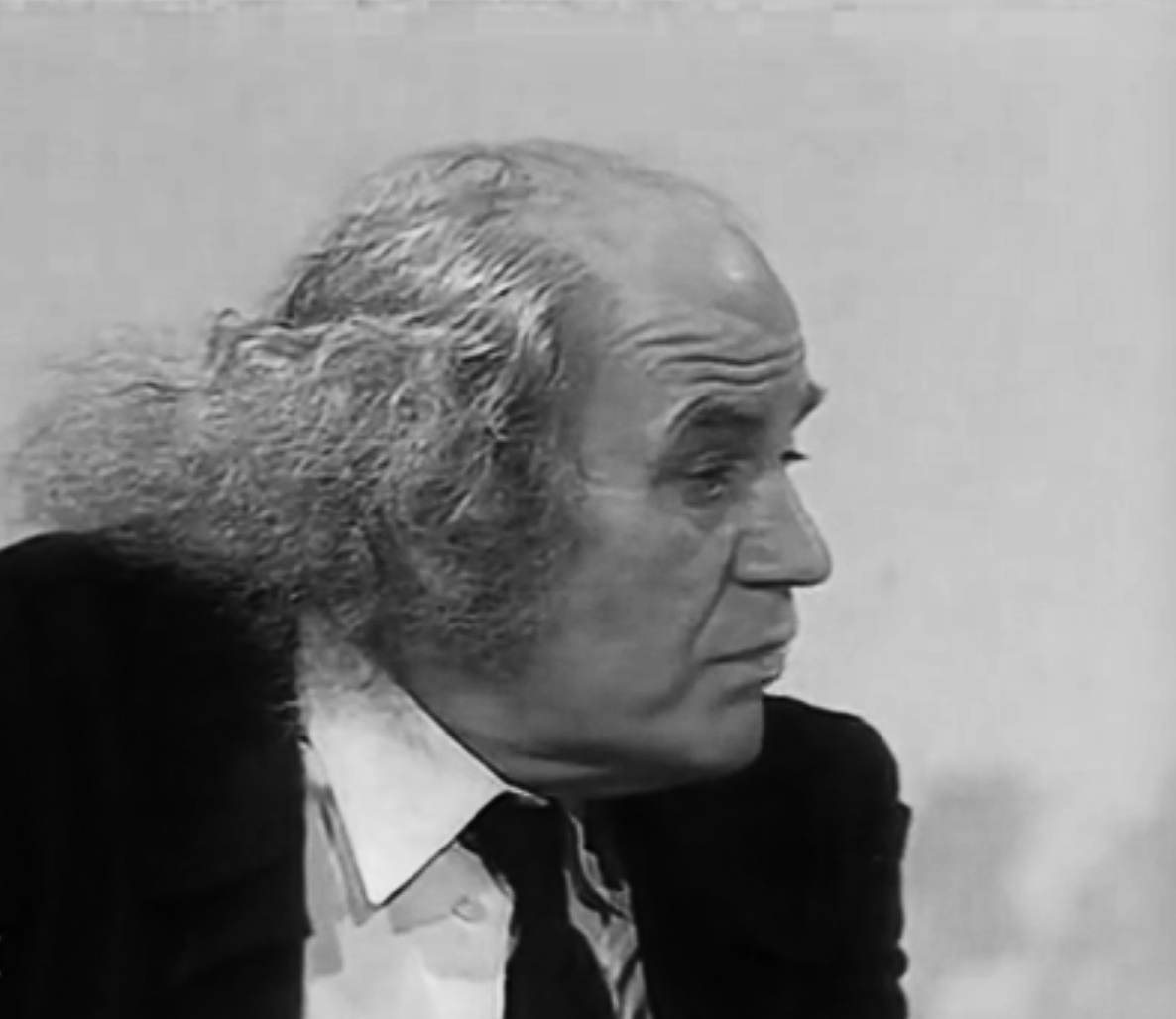
François Châtelet

=== Students ===
- Michel Allal-Volterra
- Loris Azzaro
- Elyes Ben Miled
- Kamel Ben Naceur
- Albert Bessis
- Mohamed Bouchiha
- Adam Bel Hadj Salah
- Férid Boughedir
- Michel Boujenah
- Habib Bourguiba
- Gaston Bouthoul
- Serge Bramly
- Jean-Claude Casanova
- Yves Chevallard
- Hatem El Mekki
- Colette Fellous
- Jean-Paul Fitoussi
- Claude Hagège
- Gisèle Halimi
- Mokhtar Latiri
- Alain Mamou-Mani
- Albert Memmi
- Yves Meyer
- Serge Moati
- Gilbert Naccache
- François d'Orcival
- Georges-Elia Sarfati
- Philippe Séguin
- Tahar Sfar
- Joseph Haïm Sitruk
- Alain-Gérard Slama
- Hedi Turki
- Georges Wolinski
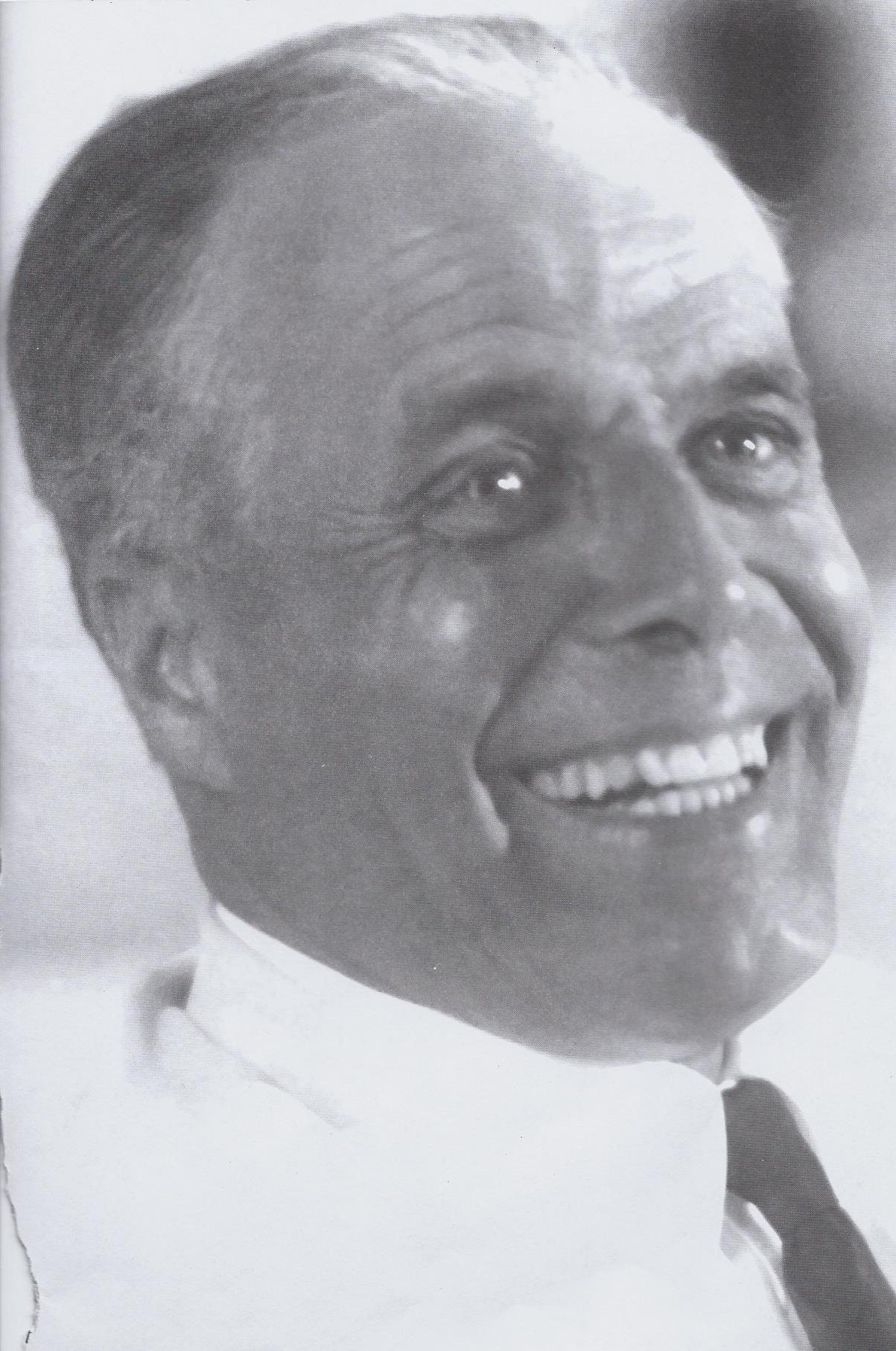
Habib Bourguiba

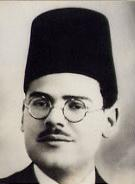
Tahar Sfar

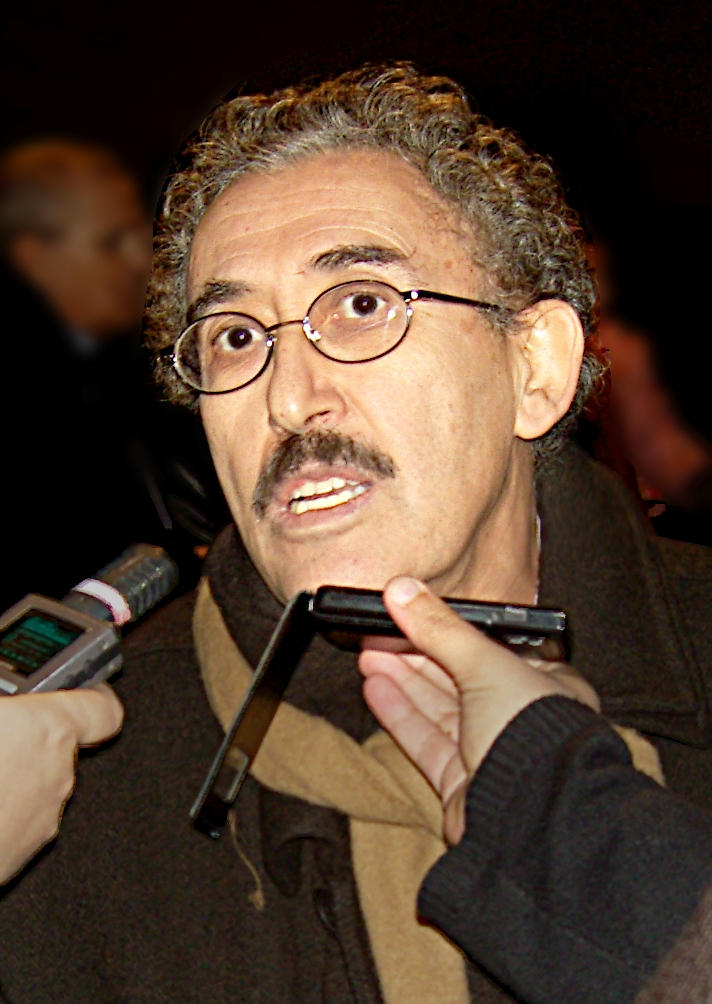
Ferid Boughdir
