= The Origins of Totalitarianism =

Book by Hannah Arendt examining Nazism and Stalinism

- The 1951 edition
- Author: Hannah Arendt
- Language: English
- Subject: Nazism, Stalinism, totalitarianism
- Publisher: Schocken Books
- Publication date: 1951
- Media type: Print (hardcover and paperback)
- Pages: 477
- OCLC: 1163364
- Dewey Decimal: 320.53 22
- LC Class: JC480 .A74 2004

The Origins of Totalitarianism, published in 1951, was Hannah Arendt's first major work, where she describes and analyzes Nazism and Stalinism as the major totalitarian political movements of the first half of the 20th century.

== History ==
The Origins of Totalitarianism was first published in English in 1951. (Note: Originally published in the United Kingdom as The Burden of Our Time.) A German translation was published in 1955 as Elemente und Ursprünge totaler Herrschaft ("Elements and Origins of Totalitarian Rule"). A second, enlarged edition was published in 1958, which contained an updated Preface and two additional chapters, replacing her original "Concluding Remarks". Chapter Thirteen was titled "Ideology and Terror: A novel form of government", which she had published separately in 1953. Chapter Fourteen dealt with the Hungarian Revolution of 1956, entitled "Epilogue: Reflections on the Hungarian Revolution". Subsequent editions omitted this chapter, which was published separately in English ("Totalitarian Imperialism: Reflections on the Hungarian Revolution") and German (Die ungarische Revolution und der totalitäre Imperialismus) in 1958. In 1967, Arendt wrote Prefaces for each of the book's three Parts, which appeared in subsequent editions.

== Structure and content ==
Like many of Arendt's books, The Origins of Totalitarianism is structured as three essays: "Antisemitism", "Imperialism" and "Totalitarianism". The book describes the various preconditions and subsequent rise of antisemitism in central, eastern, and western Europe in the early-to-mid 19th century; then examines the New Imperialism, from 1884 to the start of the First World War (1914–1918); then traces the emergence of racism as an ideology, and its modern application as an “ideological weapon for imperialism”, by the Boers during the Great Trek in the early 19th century (1830s–1840s).

In this book, Arendt argues that totalitarianism is a "novel form of government," that "differs essentially from other forms of political oppression known to us such as despotism, tyranny and dictatorship", because terror is used against entire populations rather than just political opponents. Additionally, she notes that because of its unique ideology and structural use of coercion, "totalitarianism has discovered a means of dominating and terrorizing human beings from within". She further contends that Jewry was not the operative factor in the Holocaust, but merely a convenient proxy: that totalitarianism in Germany was, in the end, about terror and consistency, not eradicating Jews only. A key concept arising from this book was the application of Kant's phrase "Radical Evil", which she applied to the men who created and carried out such tyranny and their depiction of their victims as "Superfluous People".

=== Analysis of antisemitism and imperialism ===
Arendt begins the book with an analysis of the rise of antisemitism in Europe and particularly focused on the Dreyfus affair. In particular, Arendt traces the social movement of the Jewry in Europe since their emancipation by the French edict of 1792, their special role in supporting and maintaining the nation-state and their failure to assimilate into the European class society. European Jewry's association with the nation-state meant that their destinies were to an extent tied. As Arendt observed, "modern anti-semitism grew in proportion as traditional nationalism declined, and reached its climax at the exact moment when the European system of nation-states and its precarious balance of power crashed." Nazi Germany would later exploit that antisemitism and targeted the Jewry, which was construed, among other things, as a proxy for the nation-state. In so doing, Nazism sought, among other reasons, to organize the masses to bring about the disintegration of the nation-state system and to advance the totalitarian project, which was global in its orientation.

She then discusses scientific racism and its role in colonialist imperialism, which was itself characterized by unlimited territorial and economic expansion. That unlimited expansion necessarily opposed itself and was hostile to the territorially-delimited nation-state. Arendt traces the roots of modern imperialism to the accumulation of excess capital in European nation-states during the 19th century. This capital required overseas investments outside of Europe to be productive and political control had to be expanded overseas to protect the investments. She then examines "continental imperialism" (pan-Germanism and pan-Slavism) and the emergence of "movements" substituting themselves to the political parties. Those movements are hostile to the state and antiparliamentarist and gradually institutionalize antisemitism and other kinds of racism.

Arendt concludes that while Italian fascism was a nationalist authoritarian movement, Nazism and Stalinism were totalitarian ones, aiming to remove all limits on their power. She partly attributes this difference to a minimal necessary population:

[T]otalitarian movements depend on the sheer force of numbers to such an extent that totalitarian regimes seem impossible, even under otherwise favorable circumstances, in countries with relatively small populations. ... [E]ven Mussolini, who was so fond of the term "totalitarian state," did not attempt to establish a full-fledged totalitarian regime and contented himself with dictatorship and one-party rule.

=== Mechanics of totalitarian movements ===
The book's final section is devoted to describing the mechanics of totalitarian movements by focusing on Nazi Germany and the Soviet Union. Here, Arendt discusses the transformation of classes into masses, the role of propaganda in dealing with the non-totalitarian world, and the use of terror, essential to this form of government. Then she states that totalitarian movements are fundamentally different from autocratic regimes. While autocracies aim solely for absolute political power and to suppress opposition, totalitarian regimes strive to control every aspect of individuals' lives, as a step toward global domination. She states:

... Intellectual, spiritual, and artistic initiative is as dangerous to totalitarianism as the gangster initiative of the mob, and both are more dangerous than mere political opposition. The consistent persecution of every higher form of intellectual activity by the new mass leaders springs from more than their natural resentment against everything they cannot understand. Total domination does not allow for free initiative in any field of life, for any activity that is not entirely predictable. Totalitarianism in power invariably replaces all first-rate talents, regardless of their sympathies, with those crackpots and fools whose lack of intelligence and creativity is still the best guarantee of their loyalty.

Hannah Arendt considers the Soviet and Nazi regimes alongside European colonies in Africa and Asia, as their later and gruesome transformation due to the effect of imperial boomerang. She analyzes Russian pan-Slavism as a stage in the development of racism and totalitarianism. Her analysis was continued by Alexander Etkind in the book "Internal colonization: Russia's imperial experience".

Arendt discusses the use of front organizations, fake governmental agencies, and esoteric doctrines as a means of concealing the radical nature of totalitarian aims from the non-totalitarian world. Near the end of the book, Arendt writes that loneliness is a precondition for totalitarian domination, with people who are socially isolated being more likely to be attracted to totalitarian ideology and movements.

== Reception ==
Le Monde placed the book in its list of 100 best books of the 20th century, and the National Review ranked it No. 15 on its list of the 100 best non-fiction books of the century. The Intercollegiate Studies Institute listed it among the 50 best non-fiction books of the century. The book made a major impact on Norman Podhoretz, who compared the pleasure of reading it to that of reading a great poem or novel.

The book has also attracted criticism, among them a piece in the Times Literary Supplement in 2009 by University of Chicago Professor Bernard Wasserstein. Wasserstein cited Arendt's systematic internalization of the various anti-Semitic and Nazi sources and books she was familiar with, which led to the use of many of these sources as authorities in the book. On the other hand, Gershom Scholem criticized Eichmann in Jerusalem but still praised the Origins of Totalitarianism. In several other places, Scholem mentions that he learned from Ernst Bloch that much Jewish literature and testimony in respect of some historical periods is not available due to pogroms, leaving antisemitic sources as the only surviving references for those periods.

The historian Emmanuelle Saada disputes Arendt's work and the general scholarly consensus that the rise of scientific racism directly correlates with the rise of colonialist imperialism. Saada contests that there is little evidence to support that ideas like those of Arthur de Gobineau, whom Arendt explicitly mentions, hold an important place in the scientific justification of European colonialism. Saada asserts that Arendt overemphasizes the role of scientific racism in forming modern totalitarianism, but in reality, Arendt should attribute blame to the "bureaucratic racism" she discusses elsewhere in the text.

Such scholars as Jürgen Habermas have supported Arendt in her 20th-century criticism of totalitarian readings of Marxism. That commentary on Marxism has indicated concerns with the limits of totalitarian perspectives often associated with Marx's apparent over-estimation of the emancipatory potential of the forces of production. Habermas extends that critique in his writings on functional reductionism in the life-world in his Lifeworld and System: A Critique of Functionalist Reason.

Historian John Lukacs was highly critical calling it a "flawed and dishonest book" that is "unhistorical and shrilly verbose", and claimed that Arendt's coverage of the Soviet Union was superficial.

== See also ==
- John A. Hobson's Imperialism (1902)
- Le Monde's 100 Books of the Century
- Theodor Adorno's The Authoritarian Personality (1950)
- Erich Fromm's Escape from Freedom (1941)

== Bibliography ==
- Copjec, Joan, ed. (1996). Radical Evil. Verso. ISBN 978-1-85984-911-8.
- Hattem, Cornelis Van; Hattem, Kees van (2005). Superfluous people: a reflection on Hannah Arendt and evil. University Press of America. ISBN 978-0-7618-3304-8.
- Heller, Anne Conover (2015). Hannah Arendt: A Life in Dark Times. Houghton Mifflin Harcourt. ISBN 978-0-544-45619-8. excerpt
- Hollinger, David A.; Capper, Charles, eds. (1993). The American Intellectual Tradition: Volume II 1865 to the present (2nd ed.). Oxford University Press. ISBN 978-0-19-507780-3.
- Szécsényi, Endre (30 March 2005). The Hungarian Revolution in the "Reflections" by Hannah Arendt. Europe or the Globe? Eastern European Trajectories in Times of Integration and Globalization. Vienna: IWM.* "Hannah Arendt". Contemporary Thinkers. The Foundation for Constitutional Government. 2018.
- Williams, Zoe (1 February 2017). "Totalitarianism in the age of Trump: lessons from Hannah Arendt". The Guardian.
- Riesman, David (1 April 1951). "The Origins of Totalitarianism, by Hannah Arendt". Commentary (Review).
- Nisbet, Robert (1992). "Arendt on Totalitarianism". The National Interest (Review) (27): 85–91. JSTOR 42896812.

=== Works by Arendt ===
- Arendt, Hannah (1976) [1951, New York: Schocken]. The Origins of Totalitarianism [Elemente und Ursprünge totaler Herrschaft] (revised ed.). Houghton Mifflin Harcourt. ISBN 978-0-547-54315-4.
- — (1953). "Ideology and Terror: A Novel Form of Government". The Review of Politics. 15 (3): 303–327. doi:10.1017/S0034670500001510. JSTOR 1405171. S2CID 145038093. (reprinted in Hollinger & Capper (1993, pp. 338–348)) here
- — (1958). "Totalitarian Imperialism: Reflections on the Hungarian Revolution". The Journal of Politics. 20 (1): 5–43. doi:10.2307/2127387. JSTOR 2127387. S2CID 154428972.
- — (1958). Die ungarische Revolution und der totalitäre Imperialismus (in German). München: R. Piper & Co Verlag.
