= Discourse on Colonialism =

Essay by Aimé Césaire

- English edition published 2000 with an introduction by Robin D. G. Kelley
- Author: Aime Cesaire
- Translator: Joan Pinkham
- Language: English
- Genre: Essay
- Publisher: Monthly Review
- Publication date: 2000, 1972 (English translation), 1955 (first published)
- Publication place: New York
- Media type: Print (paperback)
- ISBN: 9781583670248

Discourse on Colonialism (French: Discours sur le colonialisme) is a 1950 essay by Afro-Martiniquan poet, author and politician Aimé Césaire. Written in surrealist poetic prose, the essay analyses the origins of European fascism, arguing that Nazism is not an exception in European history, but the natural conclusion of a civilization that justifies colonization.

Césaire criticizes the "civilizing mission" and argues that colonialism de-civilizes the colonizer, as the instruments of colonial power rely on racism, torture, and barbaric violence, all which result in the degradation of Europe itself. The essay is the origin of the imperial boomerang theory, which posits that the repressive techniques used to control colonial territories are eventually deployed domestically against the colonizing countries' own citizens.

The essay also critiques the colonial ideology and theories perpetuating racial and cultural hierarchy that were published by various French intellectuals, politicians, and writers in the 19th and 20th century, such as Dominique O. Mannoni, Roger Caillois, Ernest Renan, and Jules Romains, among many others.

Discourse on Colonialism is considered a classic and foundational text of postcolonial literature and anticolonial thought.

== History ==
Césaire first published the essay in 1950 in Paris with Éditions Réclame, a small publisher associated with the French Communist Party. In 1955, he edited and republished it in the anticolonial magazine Présence africaine. It was translated into English by Joan Pinkham and published in Monthly Review in 1972. It was republished by the same press in 2000 with a new introduction by the American academic Robin D. G. Kelley.

== Summary ==
The essay is divided into six sections. The first section begins with the statement that European civilization is unable to justify itself via reason or conscience, and is morally and spiritually indefensible. Cesaire argues that colonization does not equal civilization and states that "between colonization and civilization there is an infinite distance; that out of all the colonial expeditions that have been undertaken, out of all the colonial statutes that have been drawn up, out of all the memoranda that have been dispatched by all the ministries, there could not come a single human value."

In the second section, Césaire states that with every barbaric act that is committed by the colonizer in the name of colonialism, the colonizer is decivilized and becomes accustomed to violence, racism, and moral relativism, leading to a universal moral regression in all Europeans. However, when similar acts of repression, racism, and torture are inflicted within Europe, Europeans are surprised and call it "Nazism", being unaware that they had legitimized these acts in the past because it had been applied only to non-European peoples.

Césaire argues that within every European resides a Hitler, and that the formation of Hitler is the end result of the justification and continuation of colonialist procedures "which until then had been reserved exclusively for the Arabs of Algeria, the "coolies" of India, and the "niggers" of Africa.". Césaire quotes a passage from La Reforme intellectuelle et morale by philosopher Ernest Renan justifying the existence of "master" and "degenerate" races, and similar statements by the former governor-general of Indochina Albert Sarraut, stating that in these statements, it was already Hitler speaking. Césaire argues that a nation that colonizes and justifies colonization is a morally diseased civilization which will naturally result in the formation of its "Hitler".

Césaire brings up incidents from the history of French colonial expeditions, quoting Colonel de Montagnac, Count d'Herisson, Saint-Arnaud, Thomas Robert Bugeaud, and Étienne Maurice Gérard, and argues that the "details of these hideous butcheries" prove that colonization dehumanizes and changes the colonizer, "who in order to ease his conscience gets into the habit of seeing the other man as an animal accustoms himself to treating him like an animal, and tends objectively to transform himself into an animal".

In response to common justifications of colonization as a force for economic development and increased standard of living, Césaire responds with examples of the various abuses inflicted on the colonized by the colonial powers, such as the high death toll in the construction of the Congo–Ocean Railway, the instillation of racial inferiority in the colonized, the destruction of cultures and religions, the introduction of malnutrition, and looting of agricultural products and raw materials. Césaire defends the value of non-European civilizations, and states that Europe is dishonest in trying to justify its colonizing activity by the material progress that has been achieved under the colonial regime, since no one knew at what stage of material development these same countries would have been if Europe had not intervened.

In the third section, Césaire examines the "respectable bourgeois" and their support of colonization. He describes "a scene of cannibalistic hysteria" by members of the French National Assembly in response to the Malagasy Uprising and the First Indochina War, specifically naming Georges Bidault, Marius Moutet, Paul Coste-Floret, Paul Ramadier, and Jacques Fonlupt-Espéraber in disparaging terms. Césaire states that "bourgeois swinishness is the rule", demonstrated by quoting passages attempting to justifying racial superiority by Joseph de Maistre, Georges Vacher de Lapouge, Ernest Psichari, Émile Faguet, and Jules Romains.

Césaire again defends "Negro civilizations", but does not call for a return, emphasizing that the problem is "not to make a utopian and sterile attempt to repeat the past, but to go beyond. It is not a dead society that we want to revive [...] It is a new society that we must create, with the help of all our brother slaves, a society rich with all the productive power of modern times, warm with all the fraternity of olden days." Césaire briefly mentions the Soviet Union as an example. Césaire brings up early explorers as a counterpoint to the views quoted in the previous paragraphs, specifically mentioning Maurice d'Elbée, Georges Marchais, and Antonio Pigafetta, and cites the German ethnologist Leo Frobenius, "Civilized to the marrow of their bones! The idea of the barbaric Negro is a European invention."

In the fourth section, Césaire continues his argument against members of the Western bourgeois society, telling the reader to disregard their personal intentions and whether they act in good or bad faith, as "the essential thing is that their highly problematical subjective good faith is entirely irrelevant to the objective social implications of the evil work they perform as watchdogs of colonialism." He cites from various disciplines, including geographer Pierre Gourou, missionary Placide Tempels, psychoanalyst Octave Mannoni, and writer Yves Florenne.

In the fifth section, Césaire utilizes the transgressive poetic novel Les Chants de Maldoror, a work that reflects and denounces society around 1865 (the time it was written), as a metaphor for how Nazism is a reflection of the "progressive dehumanization" experienced by the bourgeousie. He cites essayist Henri Massis's defense of the West, and criticises philosopher Roger Caillois's essay Illusions a rebours, which claims Western superiority in the field of science and ethics. In response to Henri Massis, Césaire brings up the invention of arithmetic and geometry by the Egyptions, the discovery of astronomy by the Assyrians, and chemistry by the Arabs.

To Roger Caillois' claim, Césaire mentions the various tortures inflicted by French soldiers in the Algerian War, writing, "Let us move on, and quickly, lest our thoughts wander to Algiers, Morocco, and other places where, as I write these very words, so many valiant sons of the West, in the semi-darkness of dungeons, are lavishing upon their inferior African brothers, with such tireless attention, those authentic marks of respect for human dignity which are called, in technical terms, "electricity," "the bathtub," and "the bottleneck.""

Césaire questions Callois' claims that while races are unequal, these inequalities "in no way justify an inequality of rights in favor of the so-called superior peoples, as racism would have it. Rather, they confer upon them additional tasks and an increased responsibility", and refers to the concept of the White Man's Burden. Césaire notes that Callois' views are significant, not because of any intrinsic value, but because they reflect the state of mind of the Western petty bourgeoisie.

In the sixth and final section, Césaire equates the colonial enterprise to Roman imperialism: "the prelude to Disaster and the forerunner of Catastrophe", warning that Europe may perish from the void that it has created around itself through the massacre and slaughter committed for the purpose of colonialism. He quotes intellectual Edgar Quinet on the fall of the Roman empire and why "barbarism emerged all at once in ancient civilization": "The system of ancient civilization was composed of a certain number of nationalities, of countries which, although they seemed to be enemies, or were even ignorant of each other, protected, supported, and guarded one another....So many societies, so many languages extinguished, so many cities, rights, homes annihilated, created a void around Rome, and in those places which were not invaded by the barbarians, barbarism was born spontaneously....Thus the violent downfall, the progressive extirpation of individual cities, caused the crumbling of ancient civilization."

Césaire also warns the reader against viewing the United States as a potential liberator, stating that American domination is "the only domination from which one never recovers...unscarred.", and warns against the glorification of mechanization in the service of capitalism. He states that unless Europe is able to undertake a new policy founded on respect for people and cultures, she will have "deprived itself of its last chance and, with its own hands, drawn up over itself the pall of mortal darkness." He concludes that the salvation of Europe requires revolution and the overthrow of "the narrow tyranny of a dehumanized bourgeoisie" at the hands of the proletariat.

== "Colonial boomerang" concept ==
Césaire originated the term through his analysis of the development of violent, fascist, and brutalizing tendencies within Europe as connected to the practice of European colonialism. Césaire wrote:

And then one fine day the bourgeoisie is awakened by a terrific boomerang effect: the gestapos are busy, the prisons fill up, the torturers standing around the racks invent, refine, discuss. People are surprised, they become indignant. They say: "How strange! But never mind—it's Nazism, it will pass!" And they wait, and they hope; and they hide the truth from themselves, that it is barbarism, the supreme barbarism, the crowning barbarism that sums up all the daily barbarisms; that it is Nazism, yes, but that before they were its victims, they were its accomplices; that they tolerated that Nazism before it was inflicted on them, that they absolved it, shut their eyes to it, legitimized it, because, until then, it had been applied only to non-European peoples; that they have cultivated that Nazism, that they are responsible for it, and that before engulfing the whole edifice of Western, Christian civilization in its reddened waters, it oozes, seeps, and trickles from every crack.

— Aimé Césaire, Discourse on Colonialism (1950)

In the original French, Césaire did not use the term "boomerang" and instead wrote un formidable choc en retour—"a formidable shock in return". In previous English translations, the phrase "terrific reverse shock" is used.

The concept was also utilized by Hannah Arendt, termed the "boomerang effect" in The Origins of Totalitarianism (1951). It is sometimes called Foucault's boomerang as Michel Foucault also described the phenomenon in the 1970s.

== Arguments ==
Aimé Césaire's Discourse on Colonialism argues that colonialism has never been a benevolent movement whose goal was to improve the lives of the colonized; instead, colonists' motives were entirely self-centered, and amount to economic exploitation. According to Césaire, by establishing colonies and then exploiting them, the European colonial powers have created two main problems: the problem of the proletariat and the colonial problem.

In describing the colonial problem that European civilization has created, he calls Europe "indefensible", whose colonizers cannot be misconstrued as positive. Césaire discusses the relationship between civilization and savagery and points out the hypocrisy of colonialism. He asserts that it is ironic that colonizers hoped to rid the countries they colonized of "savages", but in reality, by killing, raping, and destroying the land on which those "savages" lived, they showed themselves to be the true savages. His interpretation flips the common narrative to point out the autonomy that existed in colonized lands.

He bases his argument on the claim that "no one colonizes innocently, that no one colonizes with impunity either; that a nation which colonizes, that a civilization which justifies colonization—and therefore force—is already a sick civilization, a civilization which is morally diseased, which irresistibly, progressing from one consequence to another, one denial to another, calls for its Hitler, I mean its punishment". He labels the colonizers as barbaric for their treatment of those in the colonies. He defines the relationship as one limited to "forced labor, intimidation, pressure, the police, taxation, theft, rape, compulsory crops, contempt, mistrust, arrogance, self-complacency, swinishness, brainless elites, degraded masses".

Césaire also acknowledges the racial construction of the relationship. By identifying the colonial relationship as one based on race, he draws comparisons between his home of Martinique with the colonies in Africa. By equating racism, barbarism and colonialism, he claims colonization to be a form of dehumanization that results from Europe's racism against black populations in Africa and the Caribbean. He writes that Hitler differed in the eyes of the Europeans because he "applied to Europe colonialist procedures which until then had been reserved exclusively for the Arabs of Algeria, the 'coolies' of India and the 'niggers' of Africa." He means that by persecuting white Europeans, Hitler produced violence most commonly reserved for non-white populations. Césaire argues, "they tolerated that Nazism before it was inflicted on them, they absolved it, shut their eyes to it, legitimized it, because, until then, it had been applied only to non-European peoples".

=== Marxist theory ===
Césaire criticizes the "humanist" interpretation of colonialism because it continues to deny the humanity of the colonized peoples, the very antithesis of humanism, which emphasizes the value and agency of human beings. The most notable allusion to Marxism appears towards the end of the text when he writes, "it is a new society that we must create, with the help of all our brother slaves, a society rich with all the productive power of modern times, warm with all the fraternity of olden days. For some examples showing that this is possible, we can look to the Soviet Union".

== Reception ==
The essay been compared to "a declaration of war" on colonialism.

Discourse on Colonialism added to the themes developed in his 1939 poem Cahier d'un retour au pays natal ("Notebook of a Return to the Native Land"), which he wrote in response to leaving Metropolitan France and returning to Martinique. In Cahier, Césaire notes the relationship between Martinique and his African heritage and confirms the bond between colonies in Africa and colonies elsewhere as one based on race. In identifying the racism problem associated with the colonial relationship, he claims that Hitler and the Nazi Party's persecution of Jews during the Second World War and the Holocaust was not an aberration but rather the norm in Europe.

== See also ==
- Imperial boomerang
- Black Skin, White Masks —1952 book by Frantz Fanon
- The Wretched of the Earth —1961 book by Frantz Fanon
- The Colonizer and the Colonized —1957 book by Albert Memmi
