= France-Algeria Association =

- Founded: 20 June 1963
- Founder: Edmond Michelet
- Purpose: Promote friendship and cooperation between France and Algeria
- Location: France
- Key people: Charles de Gaulle; Germaine Tillion; Geneviève de Gaulle-Anthonioz; Jacques Pâris de Bollardière; Jean Daniel; François Mauriac
- Website: associationfrancealgerieofficiel.fr

The France-Algeria Association was founded on 20 June 1963 by prominent French figures at the initiative of Charles de Gaulle and led by Edmond Michelet, a former Minister of Justice. The association's founders shared a profound belief that Algeria's independence in July 1962 could establish a new era of mutual respect and friendship between the two states and their peoples.

The founding members included former French Resistance members such as Germaine Tillion, Geneviève de Gaulle-Anthonioz, Anise and André Postel-Vinay, Joseph Rovan, David Rousset, Robert Buron, and Stéphane Hessel. Military officials and civil servants who had opposed the abuses of the Algerian War and denounced its atrocities also joined, including General Jacques Pâris de Bollardière, General Pierre Billotte, and Paul Teitgen. Prominent journalists and writers like Jean Daniel, Jean Lacouture, Jean-Marie Domenach, André Frossard, and François Mauriac were also part of the initiative. The group included Pied-Noirs who had resisted hatred and violence during the war, as well as Algerian and French student leaders who had worked together and were eager to turn the page on a painful chapter in history.

Some of the founders had already been involved in solidarity associations for the Algerian people: the "Aid Fund for Victims of the OAS Attacks" created in 1961 by André Postel-Vinay and François Bloch-Lainé; the "Franco-Algerian Solidarity Fund" initiated by Germaine Tillion and Pierre Emmanuel; and the "Committee for Djamila Boupacha" led by Françoise de Liencourt and Jacques Fonlupt-Espéraber.

The association quickly attracted younger members, including individuals who had completed their military service in Algeria or participated in training programs such as the École nationale d'administration. Prominent figures like Pierre Joxe, Jean-Pierre Chevènement, and Bernard Stasi joined, sharing the commitment to a cooperative future based on mutual respect and durable understanding between the French and Algerian peoples.

Since its inception, the France-Algeria Association has organized numerous initiatives, including exchange trips for local officials and young people between the two countries, economic and historical symposia, and cultural events. In 2002, the association awarded the Bouamari-Vautier Prize to Leïla Beratto and Camille Millerand for their documentary Derwisha.
