= Imperial boomerang =

Concept in political science

The imperial boomerang, or the colonial boomerang, is the theory that governments that develop repressive techniques to enforce imperialism or control colonial territories will eventually deploy those same techniques domestically against their own citizens. This concept originates with Aimé Césaire in his 1950 work Discourse on Colonialism, where Césaire analyzed the origins of European fascism. Hannah Arendt agreed with this usage, calling it the boomerang effect in The Origins of Totalitarianism (1951). It is sometimes called Foucault's boomerang as Michel Foucault also described the phenomenon in the 1970s.

According to this theory, the methods employed by Adolf Hitler and the Nazi Party in Germany were not historically unique when viewed from a global perspective. Rather, the violence was an extension of the logic of European colonialism, which had resulted in the deaths of millions across the Global South for centuries. As such, the Holocaust and Nazi atrocities were only categorized as "exceptional" because they were applied to Europeans within Europe, rather than to colonized populations in Africa, Asia, or the Americas. This framework posits that the techniques of mass surveillance, forced labor, and genocide, previously perfected in colonial territories, were "boomeranged" back to Europe.

== History ==
=== Césaire's original usage (1950) ===
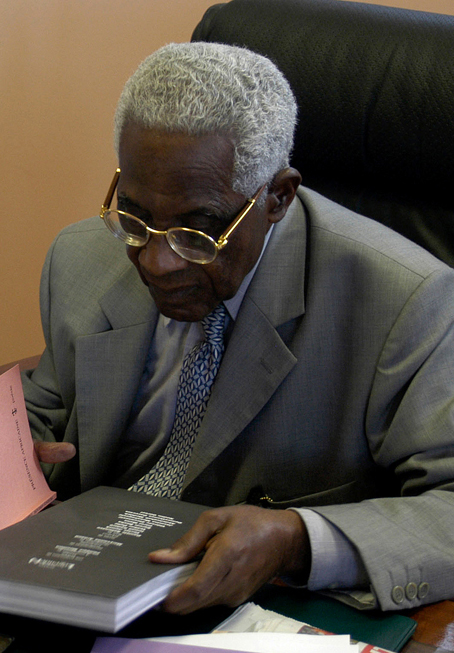
Aimé Césaire in 2003

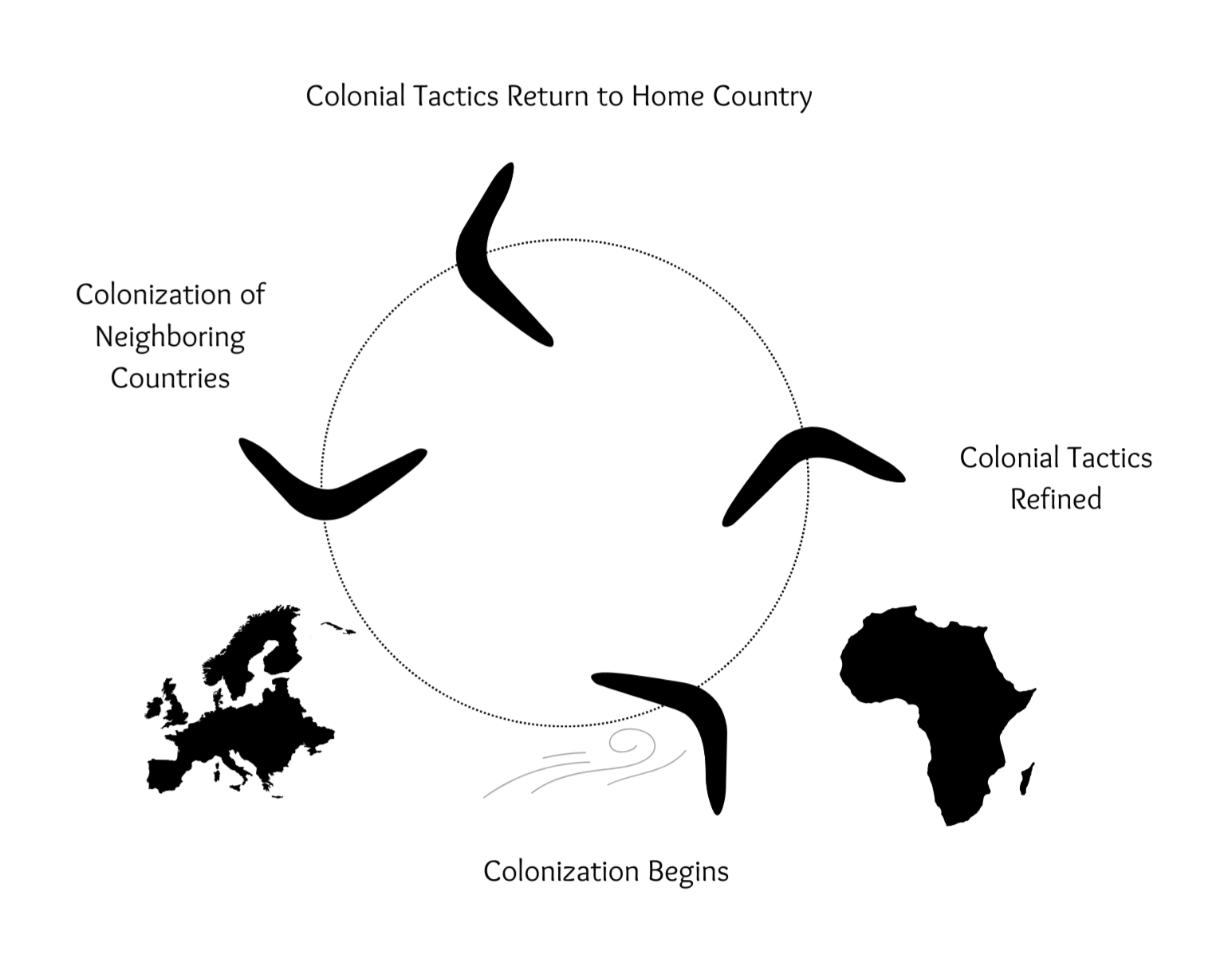
According to Césaire, fascism resembled the cruel machinery of European colonization of Africa in the 1890s.

In 1950, Aimé Césaire coined and described the term through his analysis of the development of violent, fascist, and brutalizing tendencies within Europe as connected to the practice of European colonialism. Césaire wrote in Discourse on Colonialism:

And then one fine day the bourgeoisie is awakened by a terrific boomerang effect: the gestapos are busy, the prisons fill up, the torturers standing around the racks invent, refine, discuss. People are surprised, they become indignant. They say: "How strange! But never mind—it's Nazism, it will pass!" And they wait, and they hope; and they hide the truth from themselves, that it is barbarism, the supreme barbarism, the crowning barbarism that sums up all the daily barbarisms; that it is Nazism, yes, but that before they were its victims, they were its accomplices; that they tolerated that Nazism before it was inflicted on them, that they absolved it, shut their eyes to it, legitimized it, because, until then, it had been applied only to non-European peoples; that they have cultivated that Nazism, that they are responsible for it, and that before engulfing the whole edifice of Western, Christian civilization in its reddened waters, it oozes, seeps, and trickles from every crack.

— Aimé Césaire, Discourse on Colonialism (1950)

In the original French, Césaire did not use the term "boomerang" and instead wrote un formidable choc en retour—"a formidable shock in return". In previous English translations, the phrase "terrific reverse shock" is used.

=== Arendt's usage (1951) ===
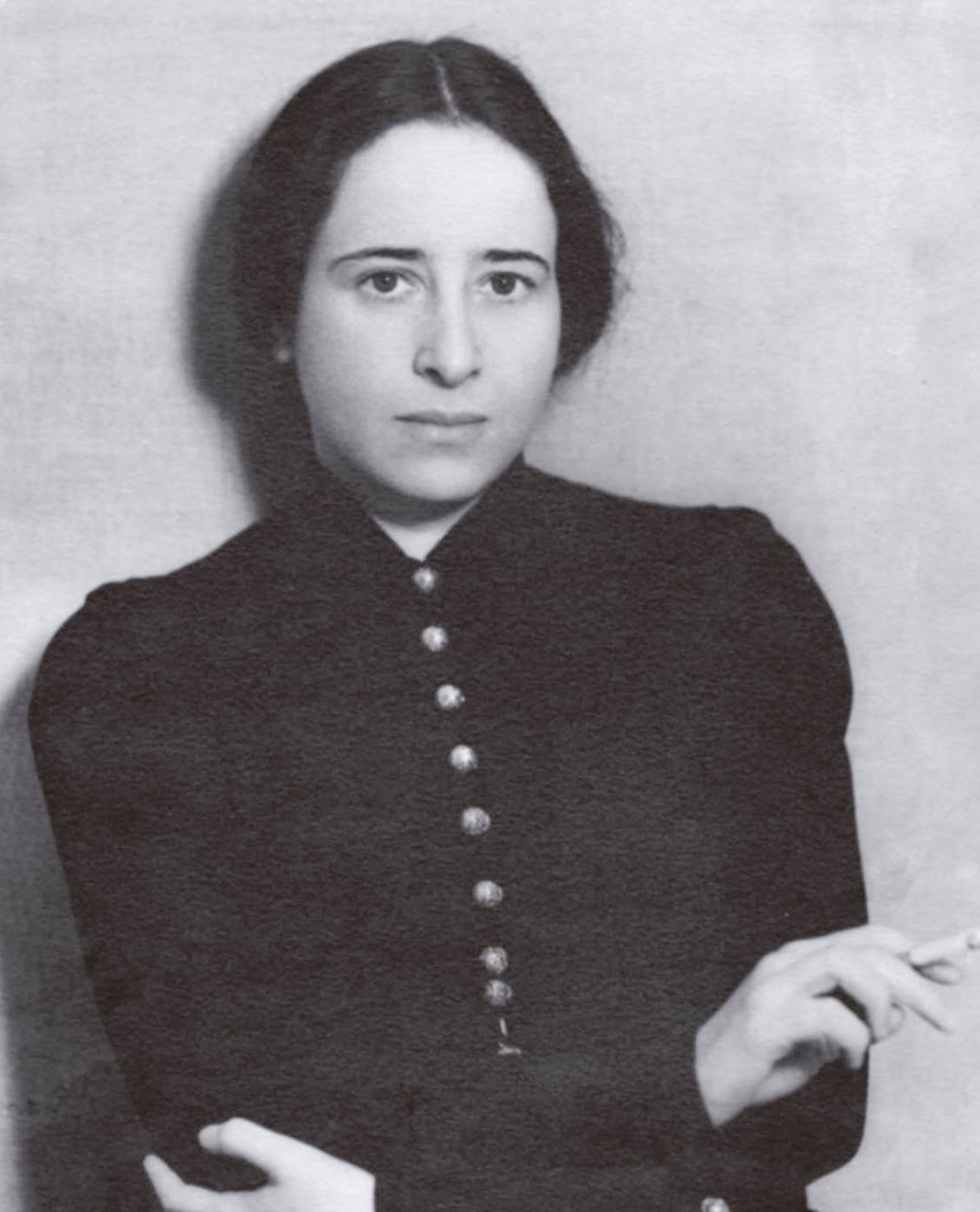
Hannah Arendt in 1933

Hannah Arendt, in her 1951 book, The Origins of Totalitarianism, considered the Soviet and Nazi regimes alongside European colonies in Africa and Asia, as their later and gruesome transformation. She analyzes Russian pan-Slavism as a stage in the development of racism and totalitarianism. Her analysis was continued by Alexander Etkind in his 2011 book Internal Colonization: Russia's Imperial Experience.

=== Association with Foucault (1976) ===
In his 1976 lecture Society Must Be Defended, Michel Foucault repeated these ideas. According to him:

[W]hile colonization, with its techniques and its political and juridical weapons, obviously transported European models to other continents, it also had a considerable boomerang effect on the mechanisms of power in the West, and on the apparatuses, institutions, and techniques of power. A whole series of colonial models was brought back to the West, and the result was that the West could practice something resembling colonization, or an internal colonialism, on itself.

Foucault's association with the concept has led to the term being referred to as Foucault's boomerang, even though he did not originate the term.

== In critical security studies ==
Historians and social scientists have applied the concept of the imperial boomerang to analyse the transnational formation of security apparatuses, focusing on the effects of the United States' overseas empire. The imperial boomerang has been invoked to explain the ongoing militarization of police and their domestic deployment in response to political protest in urban centers. Such deployment has proliferated worldwide, considering that the globalization of militarized policing continues to be a crucial aspect of contemporary foreign policy of Western colonial powers such as the United States, whose early experiments with developing comprehensive coercive state apparatuses and counterinsurgency techniques began during the American colonization of the Philippines.

Sociologist Julian Go of the University of Chicago also uses the term "imperial feedback" to refer to the boomerang effect. Focusing on how British and American colonial agents and dispatched military officials transplanted overseas counterinsurgency and police technologies back home, Go argues:

We can better see how the history of policing is entangled with imperialism and recognize that what is typically called "the militarization of policing" is in an effect of the imperial boomerang—a result of imperial-military feedback.

Go writes that August Vollmer, first police chief of Berkeley, California, often referred to as "the father of modern policing", introduced innovations which were "taken from his colonial counter-insurgency experience in the Philippines."

Some scholars suggest that the directionality of the imperial boomerang needs to be re-evaluated. Political scientist Stuart Schrader argues for a colony-centered explanation to the boomerang effect, especially in the case of the United States where imperial and racial violence predates the heyday of the American empire. In her comments on Schrader's work, political scientist Jeanne Morefield writes:

Schrader's analysis goes a long way toward explaining the seemingly acephalic quality of American imperialism, a quality which contributes to its ongoing obfuscation. Behind the logic of "liberal hegemony" lies counterinsurgency and professionalized policing, modes of racialized power that structure the everyday lives of people in America and throughout the world while deflecting attention away from that power at every level.

== Contemporary examples ==
Under the second presidency of Donald Trump in the United States, the use of immigration agents for domestic operations such as a 2026 deployment to Minnesota has been described as a manifestation of the imperial boomerang. As of 2025, about 7500 veterans of the US armed forces work for the Immigration and Customs Enforcement (ICE) agency, making up a third of the staff as of 2023. Commentators noted the presence of Iraq War and Vietnam veterans among ICE personnel in these operations, and United States foreign policy in the Middle East, particularly post-9/11 and during the 2023–present Gaza war, has been cited as a factor impelling the boomerang. Separately, political philosopher Jason Stanley located the boomerang's origin in the internal colonization of black Americans.

In the opinion of US journalist Spencer Ackerman, "Were Césaire alive to conduct a structural analysis of the advancing militarization of American law enforcement, I suspect he would have understood the Department of Homeland Security (DHS) as a template for how Imperial Boomerangs operate in the 21st century." Former UN official Craig Mokhiber characterized the militarization of police and mass surveillance in the US as manifestations of the boomerang, and a "sample" of US conduct in West Asia. US army veteran Anthony Aguilar assessed that "The imperial boomerang has come home, the terror that we export, the oppression that we export, will come back to our streets."

== See also ==
- Discourse on Colonialism
- Postcolonialism
- Military-industrial complex
- Namibian genocide and the Holocaust
