= Albert Memmi =

French writer (1920–2020)

- ألبير ممّي
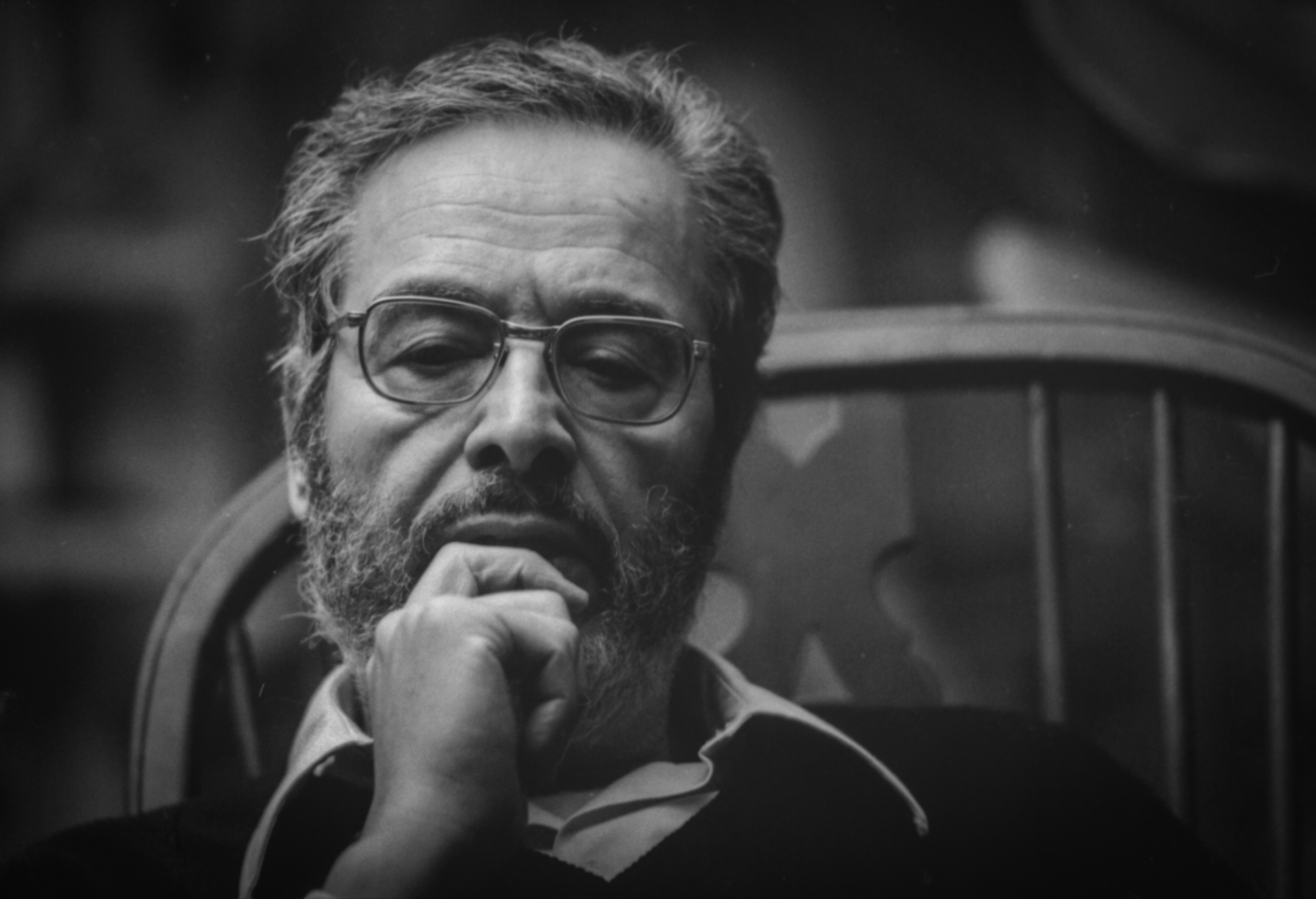
- Albert Memmi (1982) by Claude Truong-Ngoc
- Born: 15 December 1920; Tunis, French Tunisia
- Died: 22 May 2020 (aged 99); Neuilly-sur-Seine, France
- Occupations: Writer, essayist
- Notable work: The Colonizer and the Colonized
- Spouse: Marie-Germaine Dubach
- Children: 3

Albert Memmi (Arabic: ألبير ممّي; 15 December 1920 – 22 May 2020) was a French-Tunisian writer and essayist of Tunisian Jewish origins. A prominent intellectual, his nonfiction books and novels explored his complex identity as an anti-imperialist, deeply related to his ardent Zionism. He viewed Zionism as a form of "anti-colonialism."

== Biography ==
Memmi was born in Tunis, French Tunisia in December 1920, one of 13 children of Tunisian Jewish Berber Maïra (or Marguerite) Sarfati and Tunisian-Italian Jewish Fradji (or Fraji, or François) Memmi, a saddle maker. He grew up speaking French and Tunisian-Judeo-Arabic. During the Nazi occupation of Tunisia, Memmi was imprisoned in a forced labor camp from which he later escaped.

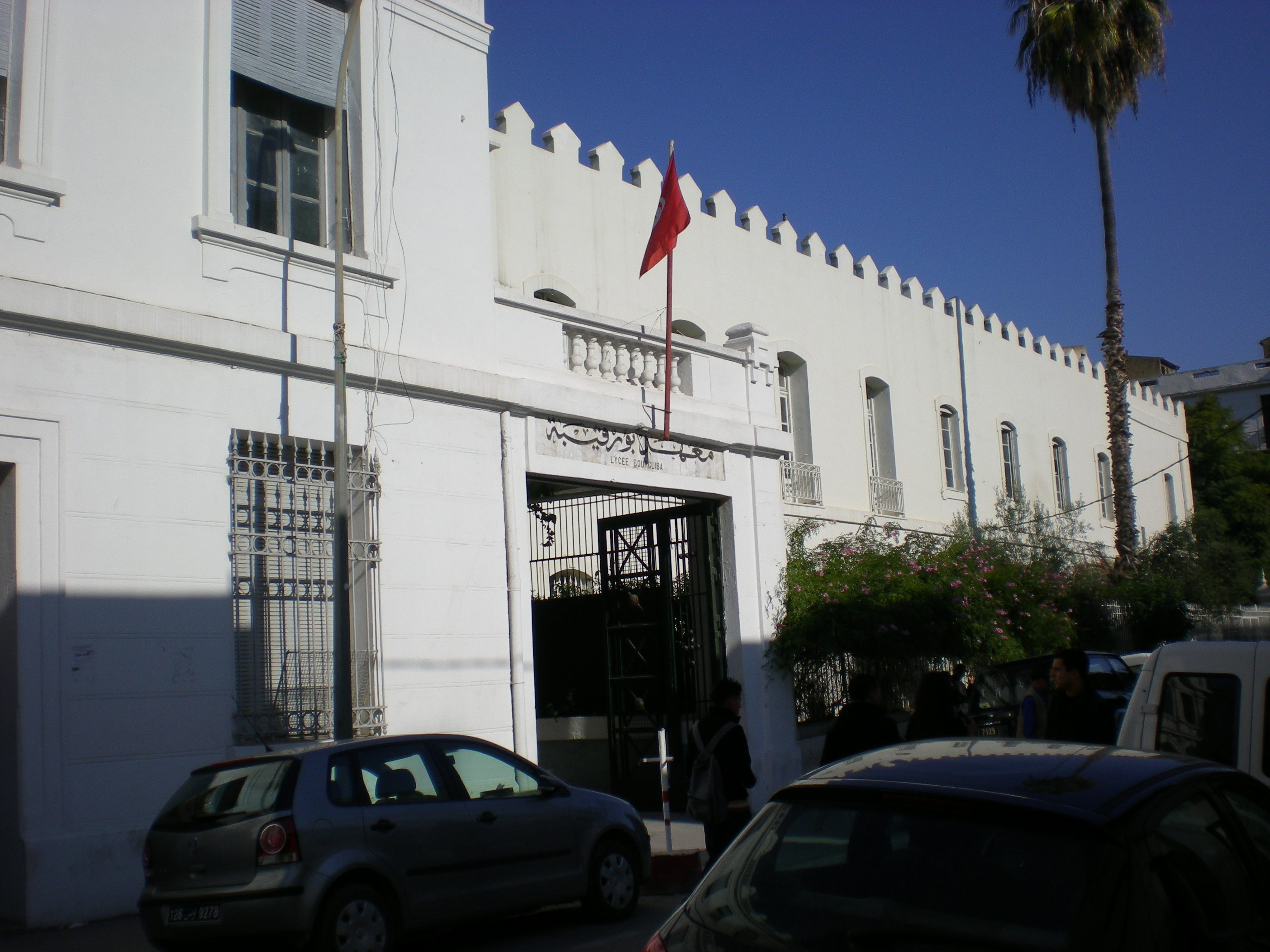
Lycée Carnot in Tunis

Memmi started Hebrew school when he was 4. He was educated in French primary schools, and continued his secondary studies at the prestigious Lycée Carnot de Tunis in Tunis, where he graduated in 1939. During World War II, he was studying philosophy at the University of Algiers when France's collaborationist Vichy regime implemented anti-Semitic laws. As a result, he was expelled from the university and subsequently sent to a labor camp in eastern Tunisia. After the war, Memmi resumed his studies at the Sorbonne in Paris and married Marie-Germaine Dubach, a French Catholic, with whom he had three children. The family returned to Tunis in 1951, where Memmi taught high school.

Memmi became a professor at the Sorbonne and earned his doctorate there in 1970. In 1975, he was appointed as a director of the School of Higher Studies in Social Sciences. He also held positions at the École des hautes études commerciales and at the University of Nanterre.

Despite his support for Tunisian independence, once Tunisia achieved independence in 1956, Memmi moved to France. Memmi wrote about his conflicted sense of identity in The Pillar of Salt (1953):

I am a Tunisian, but of French culture. I am Tunisian, but Jewish, which means that I am politically and socially an outcast. I speak the language of the country with a particular accent and emotionally I have nothing in common with Muslims. I am a Jew who has broken with the Jewish religion and the ghetto, is ignorant of Jewish culture and detests the middle class.

He died in May 2020, in Neuilly-sur-Seine, France, at the age of 99.

== Writings ==
Memmi found himself at the crossroads of three cultures, and based his work on the difficulty of finding a balance between the East and the West.

Memmi's well-regarded first novel, La statue de sel (translated as The Pillar of Salt), was published in 1953 with a preface by Albert Camus and was awarded the Fénéon Prize in 1954. His vivid story of an escape from a Tunisian ghetto was semi-autobiographical. The backgrounds of the protagonist's parents matched his own. His other novels include Agar (translated as Strangers), Le Scorpion (The Scorpion), and Le Desert (The Desert).

His best-known non-fiction work is The Colonizer and the Colonized, about the interdependent relationship of the two groups. It was published in 1957, a time when many national liberation movements were active. Jean-Paul Sartre wrote the preface. The work is often read in conjunction with Frantz Fanon's Les damnés de la Terre (The Wretched of the Earth) and Peau noire, masques blancs (Black Skin, White Masks) and Aimé Césaire's Discourse on Colonialism. In October 2006, Memmi's follow-up to this work, entitled Decolonization and the Decolonized, was published. In this book, Memmi suggests that in the wake of global decolonization, the suffering of former colonies cannot be attributed to the former colonizers, but to the corrupt leaders and governments that control these states.

Memmi's related sociological works include Dominated Man, Dependence, and Racism.

Memmi wrote extensively on Jewish identity and the place of the Jew in Muslim North African states after independence, including Portrait of a Jew, Liberation of the Jew and Jews and Arabs.

He was also known for the Anthology of Maghrebian literature (written in collaboration) published in 1965 (vol. 1) and 1969 (vol. 2).

Reviewing Memmi's fiction, scholar Judith Roumani asserts that the Tunisian writer's work "reveals the same philosophical evolution over time from his original viewpoints to less radical but perhaps more realistic positions." She concludes that "his latest fiction is certainly more innovative and different than his earlier work."

In his review for The New York Times, essayist and critic Richard Locke described Albert Memmi's earlier novels as memoirs "recorded with a cleareyed sensitivity, a modest candor, and remarkable strength." He likened Memmi to "a Tunisian Balzac graced with Hemingway's radical simplicity and sadness." Locke further wrote, "But ultimately, it is Memmi's heart, not his skill, that moves you: the sights and sounds of Tunis, the childhood memories, the brothers' sympathetic and contrasting voices, their all-too-human feelings, have a resonance that reawakens for a while the ghost of European humanism."

In a 2018 article for The Jewish Review of Books, Daniel Gordon wrote that Memmi “has combined, perhaps more than any other writer since World War II, the compassion needed to articulate the suffering of oppressed groups with the forthrightness needed to censure them for their own acts of oppression.”

In 1995, Memmi said of his own work: "All of my work has been in sum an inventory of my attachments; all of my work has been, it should be understood, a constant revolt against my attachments; all of my work, for certain, has been an attempt at...reconciliation between the different parts of myself."

== Refuting scientific racism ==
In Racisme (Racism in English), Memmi defined racism as a social construction assigning values to biological differences (both real and imagined) “to the advantage of the one defining and deploying them, and to the detriment of the one subjected to that act of definition”. In doing so, he countered three major arguments of scientific racism— a pseudoscientific belief in the existence of empirical evidence in support of racist beliefs. First, that pure and distinct races exist; second, that biologically ‘pure’ races were superior to others; and finally, that superior races had legitimate dominance over others. Memmi opposed this belief, asserting biological differences across human beings correlated with changes in geography, and that biological purity was a particular human fantasy. Memmi also pointed out that no evidence existed in support of the idea of racial purity, and merit, rather than biology, was the only basis of superiority. In this way, Memmi's arguments for racism as a social construct were important in refuting the notion of science as a basis for racist thought.

Sean P. Hier, in a review of Memmi's Racism, calls it "well-written and autobiographically informed." He writes that Memmi's main claim is that racism is a "'lived experience' arising within human situations which only secondarily become 'social experiences.' According to Hier, Memmi writes that racism is "endemic to collective human existence."

== Honours and awards ==
- Chevalier of the Order of Legion of Honour
- Commandeur of the Order of Glory (Tunisia)
- Officier of the Order of the Republic (Tunisia)

== Bibliography ==
=== French ===
- À contre-courants. Paris: Nouvel Objet, c1993. ISBN 2-84085-002-8
- Ah, quel bonheur ! précédé de L'exercice du bonheur. Paris: Arléa: Diffusion Seuil, c1995. ISBN 2-86959-250-7
- Albert Memmi : un entretien avec Robert Davies suivi de Itinéraire de l'expérience vécue à la théorie de la domination. Montréal: Éditions L'Étincelle; distributeur, Réédition Québec, c1975.
- Bonheurs: 52 semaines. Paris: Arléa, c1992. ISBN 2-86959-142-X
- Le buveur et l'amoureux: le prix de la dépendance. Paris: Arléa : Diffusion Seuil, c.1998. ISBN 2-86959-391-0
- Ce que je crois. Paris: B. Grasset, c1985. ISBN 2-246-31171-3
- La dépendance: esquisse pour un portrait du dépendant. Paris: Gallimard, c.1979.
- Le désert: ou, La vie et les aventures de Jubair Ouali El-Mammi. Paris: Gallimard, c1977.
- Dictionnaire critique à l'usage des incrédules. Paris: Kiron/Editions du Félin, c.2002. ISBN 2-86645-430-8
- L'écriture colorée, ou, Je vous aime en rouge: essai sur une dimension nouvelle de l'écriture, la couleur. Paris: Périple : Distribution Distique, c1986. ISBN 2-904549-03-X
- L'Homme dominé. Paris: Gallimard, 1968.
- L'Homme dominé : le Noir, le colonisé, le prolétaire, le Juif, la femme, le domestique, le racisme. Nouvelle éd. Paris: Payot, 1973. ISBN 2-228-32230-X
- L'individu face à ses dépendances. Paris: Vuibert, c2005. ISBN 2-7117-6181-9
- Le juif et l'autre. Etrepilly: C. de Bartillat, c1995. ISBN 2-84100-025-7
- Juifs et Arabes. Paris: Gallimard, 1974.
- Le nomade immobile : récit. Paris: Arléa, c2000. ISBN 2-86959-521-2
- Le personnage de Jeha dans la littérature orale des Arabes et des Juifs. Jerusalem: Institute of Asian and African Studies, Hebrew University of Jerusalem (1974?)
- Le pharaon : roman. Paris: Julliard, c1988. ISBN 2-260-00535-7
- Portrait du colonisé, précédé du portrait du colonisateur ... Preface by Jean-Paul Sartre. Paris: Payot, 1973.
- Portrait du colonisé, précédé du portrait du colonisateur; preface by Jean-Paul Sartre. Suivi de Les Canadiens francais sont-ils des colonisés? Ed. rev. et corr. par l'auteur. Montréal: L'Etincelle, 1972. ISBN 0-88515-018-X
- Portrait du colonisé, précédé de portrait du colonisateur: et d'une préface de Jean-Paul Sartre. Paris: Gallimard, c1985. ISBN 2-07-070550-1
- Portrait du décolonisé arabo-musulman et de quelques autres. Paris: Gallimard, c2004. ISBN 2-07-077110-5
- Portrait du décolonisé arabo-musulman et de quelques autres. Ed. corr. et augm. d'une postface. Paris: Gallimard, c2004. ISBN 2-07-077377-9
- Portrait d'un Juif. Paris: Gallimard, 1962–66.
- Le racisme : description, définition, traitement. Paris: Gallimard, c1982. ISBN 2-07-035461-X
- Le Scorpion, ou, La confession imaginaire. Paris: Gallimard, 1969.
- La statue de sel, roman. Paris: Correa [1953].
- La statue de sel. Préf. d'Albert Camus. Éd. revue et corr. Paris: Gallimard, 1966.
- Térésa et autres femmes: récits. Paris: Félin, c2004. ISBN 2-86645-568-1
- La terre intérieure: entretiens avec Victor Malka. Paris: Gallimard, c1976.

=== English ===
- The Colonizer and the Colonized. Introduction by Jean-Paul Sartre; afterword by Susan Gilson Miller; translated by Howard Greenfeld. London, UK: Earthscan Publications, 1990, ISBN 9781853830709. Expanded ed. Boston: Beacon Press, c1991. ISBN 0-8070-0301-8
  - eBook version available. Plunkett Lake Press, 2013. ASIN B00BRYDM3A
- Decolonization and the Decolonized. Translated by Robert Bononno. Minneapolis: University of Minnesota Press, c2006. ISBN 0-8166-4734-8
- Dependence: A Sketch for a Portrait. New York: Orion Press [1968].
- Jews and Arabs. Translated from the French by Eleanor Levieux. Chicago: J. P. O'Hara, c1975. ISBN 0-87955-327-8 ISBN 0879553286
- The Liberation of the Jew. Translated from the French by Judy Hyun. New York: Orion Press [1966].
  - eBook version available. Plunkett Lake Press, 2013. ASIN B00B8XY5E0
- The Pillar of Salt. Translated by Edouard Roditi. Boston: Beacon Press, 1992. ISBN 0-8070-8327-5
- The Pillar of Salt. Chicago: J. P. O'Hara, [1975] c1955. ISBN 0-87955-907-1
  - eBook version available. Plunkett Lake Press, 2013. ASIN B00D50BA7E
- Portrait of a Jew. Translated from the French by Elisabeth Abbott. New York: Orion Press [1962]
  - eBook version available. Plunkett Lake Press, 2013. ASIN B00B8XY1JO
- Racism. Translated and with an introduction by Steve Martinot. Minneapolis: University of Minnesota Press, c2000. ISBN 0-8166-3164-6
- The Scorpion, or, The Imaginary Confession. Translated from the French by Eleanor Levieux. New York: Grossman, 1971. 0670622710
- Strangers. Translated from the French by Brian Rhys. New York: Orion Press [1960]

=== Hebrew ===
- Yehudim VeArvim, translated by Aharon Amir, Sifriyat Hapo'alim, [1975]
- Netziv Hamelah, translated by Yosef Luz, Sifria La'am- Am Oved, [1960]
