= The Colonizer and the Colonized =

Book by Albert Memmi

- Author: Albert Memmi
- Language: French
- Publication date: 1957
- ISBN: 978-1788167727

The Colonizer and the Colonized (French: Portrait du colonisé, précédé par Portrait du colonisateur) is a nonfiction book by Albert Memmi, published in French in 1957 and first published in an English translation in 1965. The work explores and describes the psychological effects of colonialism on colonized and colonizers alike.

Colonizers, according to Memmi, idolize their own cultures and degrade colonized cultures, as colonization itself valorizes racism as both a foundational premise and the ultimate expression of its power.

Memmi argues that the colonized have a complex and contradictory relation with the colonizers, hating them while simultaneously admiring them. Effective decolonization requires the colonized to complete three steps: first, accept separateness and see themselves as individuals as well as a collective people; second, to engage in excessive self-affirmation to encourage their developing political subjectivity; and third, to establish a truthful perception of one's self (and, one's people). He suggests that neither the colonized nor the colonizers have achieved this final step.

When it was published in 1957, many national liberation movements were active. Jean-Paul Sartre wrote the preface. The work is often read in conjunction with Frantz Fanon's Les damnés de la Terre (The Wretched of the Earth) and Peau noire, masques blancs (Black Skin, White Masks) and Aimé Césaire's Discourse on Colonialism.

In 2004, Memmi published a follow-up book, Portrait du décolonisé: arabo-musulman et de quelques autres. The English-language edition, Decolonization and the Decolonized, appeared in 2006.
