= Georges-Elia Sarfati =

French philosopher and poet (born 1957)

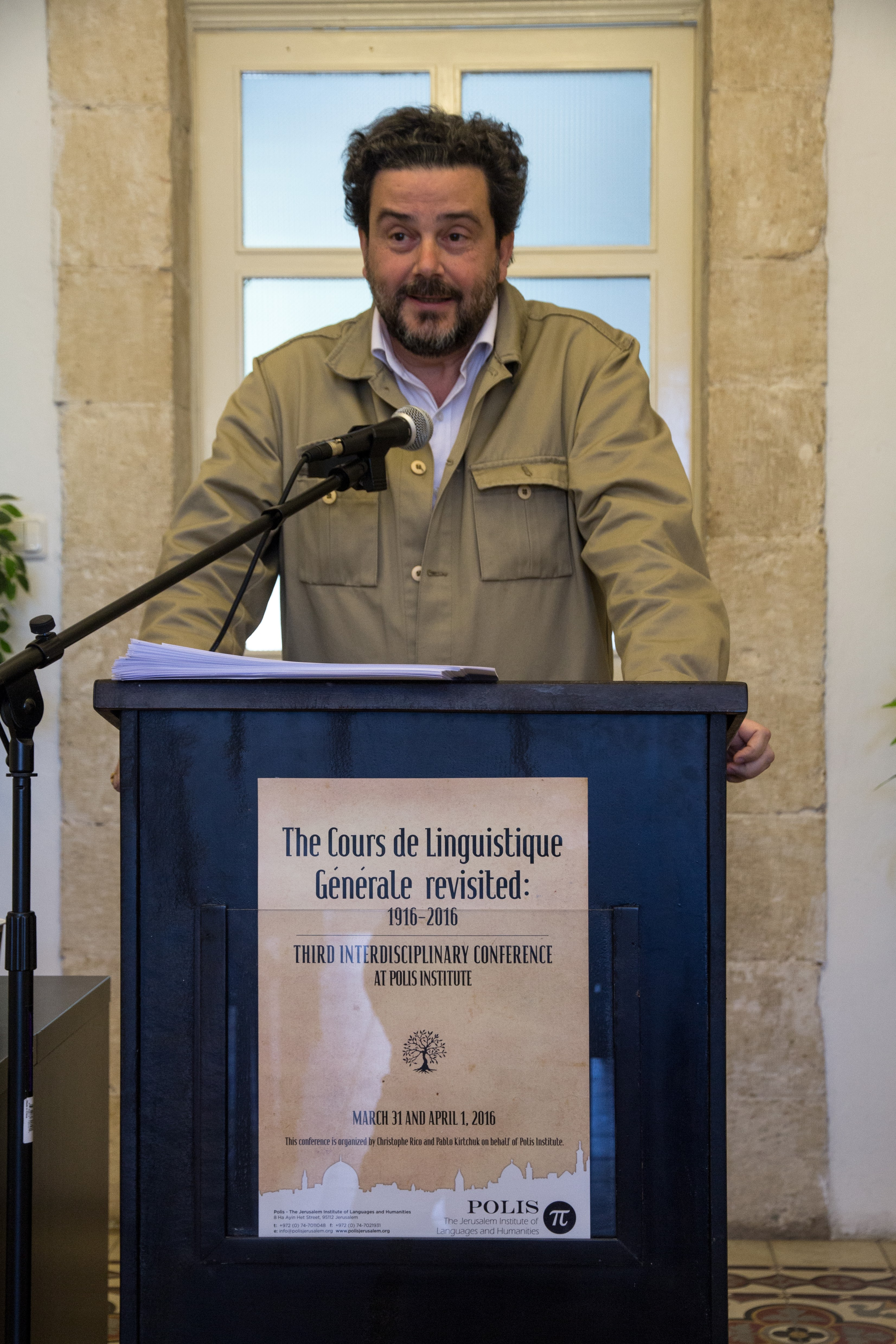
- Georges-Elia Sarfati in The Police Institute
- Born: 20 October 1957 (age 68); Tunis, Tunisia
- Awards: Louise Labé Prize (2002)

Academic work
- School or tradition: Jewish philosophy
- Main interests: Ethics, hermeneutics, historical criticism, discourse analysis, social philosophy, poetics
- Notable ideas: Negative Judeocentrism
- Website: http://georgeseliasarfati.com

Georges-Elia Sarfati (French: [saʁfati]; born 20 October 1957) is a Tunisian-born French philosopher, linguist, poet, and an existentialist psychoanalyst, author of written works in the domains of ethics, Jewish thought, social criticism, and discourse analysis. He has translated Viktor E. Frankl. He is the grand-nephew of the sociologist Gaston Bouthoul. He is a university professor (of French linguistics), member of the teaching staff of the Elie Wiesel Center for Jewish Studies, and educational director of the University Center Sigmund Freud in Paris.

== Biography ==
In 1989, he presented a doctoral thesis under the supervision of Oswald Ducrot at the School for Advanced Studies in the Social Sciences (Paris). In 1996, he was appointed as a research supervisor at the University Sorbonne-Paris IV. He is also a graduate of the Salomon Schechter Institute (Jerusalem, Israel), and he has a doctorate in Hebrew and Jewish Studies at the University of Strasbourg.

== Thought ==
Aware of the persistence of the "Jewish question" in Europe, following Leon Poliakov, and Jean-Pierre Faye, he is, as well as P.-A. Taguieff and S. Trigano, one of the first intellectuals to diagnose the emergence of new anti-Semitism through its cultural, ideological, and political variations. The contemporary expression of Judeophobia doesn't solely stem from the recycling of the conspiracy theory, it builds upon its establishment in the history of mentalities and speeches. Its platitudes are defining a "negative Judeocentrism", related to the spread of the post-modern ideology, characterized by the obviousness of the conformists. The anti-Zionist rhetoric, genuinely a part of popular culture, especially in France, is one of the main characteristics of contemporary pseudo-progressivism.

The denunciation of that state of affairs doubles up as a critique of post-genocidal ideology, whereby memory of the Shoah serves as an identity to the survivors of the big slaughter, isolating their dignity as victims, under the express condition that they demonstrate no sympathy towards Israel. Ignorance of Jewish culture is based on three parameters: the biased teaching of Jewish history at school, partial and biased information processing, and exclusive media focus on the conflict in the Middle East.

The history of psychological warfare based upon the examination of rhetorical disinformation, propaganda("totalitarian" or "commercial") rests in principle on the inversion of values, and the strategic designation of a "scapegoat." After two millennia of cultural development, it is not surprising that Jewish symbolism has been subject to all types of distortions. The first lessons of the Jewish Bible (the concepts of the individual, free choice, equality in human dignity, justice, love for neighbors, moral obligation towards everything alien, in the categories of hope and utopia) have been subverted into their opposite, through ideological discourse. This can be seen from the infamous stereotypes that prevailed in the Middle Ages to modern accusations of "communitarianism", "racism", and "cruelty".

It follows that the "globalization" of the market doubles as a "globalization" of this ignorance. In this hazardous context, it is imperative to revive a tradition of scholarship and intellectual clarity, one which specifically rehabilitates textual sources and values of Jewish humanism, restoring a historical heritage broken by a culture of slogans. This perspective includes the exhumation and comments of the scholarly tradition that preceded and accompanied the development of Western civilization, especially the teachings of the Musar, relayed through the rabbinical chain of transmission, the ancient discipline of spiritual exercises.

The analysis of this social pathology brings up questions regarding language mechanisms in the production of opinion (doxa), and the way in which it dominates public space.

This critical point of view contributes to the renewal of social philosophy, showing that in a world saturated by media communication, discourse experiences organize the social representations and determine new forms of alienation and reification. G.-E. Sarfati coined the neologism doxopathia which, in a context of cultural destruction, the enslavement and dependency phenomenon of the masses is a direct result of the automation of the dominant opinion. Extending Antonio Gramsci's thinking about the dissemination of standards and knowledge through society, he developed a general theory of the common understanding by creating the methodological tools of a counter-discourse.

But the semantics and anthropological questions surrounding the establishment of a meaning find their other honored expression in the context ofexistential analysis, and logotherapy, where one must give meaning to one's own life, confronted with the requisites of its own existence, by splitting up all determinations that affect the project, with one's current degree of autonomy. From this point of view, the subjective search for meaning remains inseparable from the ethical and political struggle for freedom, from the snares of conformity and totalitarianism.

In light of the foregoing aspects of research, the work of poetic language is understood as shimmering memories of a subject through the evocation of the crux of the matter at hand. The exploration of the signs of presence to the world, according to the metamorphoses of history, is a defense of the singularity that confronts the new "idols of the tribe", that is the impersonal rule of "hearsay" and production of an objectified language.

== Bibliography ==
=== Books ===
==== Studies, essays, interviews ====
- La tradition éthique du judaïsme. Introduction au Moussar, Paris, Berg International, 2014.
- L’histoire à l’œuvre. Trois études sur Emmanuel Lévinas, Paris, L’Harmattan, Col. « Judaïsme », 2010.
- L’antisionisme. Israël/Palestine aux miroirs d’Occident, Paris, Berg International, 2003.
- Le Vatican et la Shoah. Comment l’Eglise s’absout de son passé, Paris, Berg International, 2000.
- Discours ordinaire et identités juives. La représentation des Juifs et du judaïsme dans les dictionnaires et encyclopédies de langue française, du Moyen-Âge au XX^{è} siècle, Préface de Jean-Pierre Faye, Paris, Berg International, 1999.
- L’envers du destin. Entretiens avec Léon Poliakov, Paris, Bernard de Fallois, 1989.
- La nation captive. Sur la question juive en union soviétique, Paris, Nouvelle Cité, Col. « Rencontres », 1985.
- Les Protocoles des Sages de Sion et la conception policière de l’histoire, in Faux et Usages d’un Faux, dir. P.-A. Taguieff, Paris, Berg International, 1992, T.2, pp. 39–162.

==== Linguistics, discourse analysis ====
- Dictionnaire de pragmatique, Paris, Armand Colin, Col. « Dictionnaires », 2012, en col. Avec J. Longhi.
- Les grandes théories de la linguistique. De la grammaire comparée à la pragmatique linguistique, Paris, Armand Colin, Col. « Fac Université », 2003, en col. Avec M.-A. Paveau, traductions polonaise et brésilienne.
- Eléments d’analyse du discours, Paris, Paris, Armand Colin, Col. « 128 », 1^{ère} éd. 1996, 2è éd. 2012, traduction chinoise et brésilienne.
- Précis de pragmatique, Paris, Armand Colin, Col. « 128 », 2003.
- La sémantique : De l’énonciation au sens commun. Eléments d’une pragmatique topique, HDR, 1996. En ligne sur www.revue-texto.net
- Dire, agir, définir. Dictionnaires et langage ordinaire, Préface de Oswald Ducrot, Paris, L’Harmattan, Col. « Logiques Sociales », 1995.

=== Translations ===
- M. Cloître – L. R. Cohen, K.C. Koren, Traiter les victimes de la maltraitance infantile. Psychothérapie de l’existence interrompue, Paris, Dunod, Col. « L’atelier du praticien », 2014.
- Frankl, V.E., Ce qui ne figure pas dans mes livres. Autobiographie. Paris, Dunod, InterEditions, 2014.
- Frankl, V.E, Nos raisons de vivre. A l’école du sens de la vie, Paris, Dunod, InterEditions, 2009.
- Frankl, V.E., Le Dieu inconscient. Psychothérapie et religion, Paris, Dunod, InterEdition, 2012.

=== Poetry ===
- Tessiture, suivi de Fragments d’une poétique, dessins de Jessica Vaturi, Paris, Editions Caractères, 2014.
- L’heure liguée, suite pour Gramophone, Paris, L’Harmattan, Col. « Poètes des cinq Continents », 2002. Prix Louise-Labé, 2002.
- Le gramophone d’Ingres, Paris, Les 4 Fils, 1985.

=== Anthologies ===
- Penseurs juifs de France, Paris, L’Harmattan, 2000, J. Eladan
- Poètes juifs de langue française, Paris, Editions de Courcelles, 2010, J. Eladan
- Anthologie de la poésie juive de l’Antiquité à nos jours, Paris, Mazarine/Fayard, P. Hayat, 1985
- Les nouveaux poètes français et francophones,dir. J. Favre – M. Vincenot, Ed. Jean-Pierre Huguet, Col. « Les lettres du temps », 2004.
- Anthologie des poetes du Prix Louise Labe, Paris, Aumage editions, Editions Hybride, 2006

=== Work supervising ===
- Les discours institutionnels en confrontation. Contribution à l’analyse des discours institutionnels et politiques, Paris, L’Harmattan, Col. « Espaces discursifs », 2014, en col. Avec J. Longhi.
- Discours et sens commun, Langages, n°178, Paris, Larousse, 2008.
- Discours, culture, politique. Essai de redéfinition de la fonction critique, Institut Français de Tel-Aviv, Col. « Espace pour un dialogue », Tel-Aviv/Paris, 1998.
- Ethique et écriture, Paris, Les Cahiers de l’Archipel, n°13, Le Hameau éd., 1985.
