= Jacques Fonlupt-Espéraber =

French politician (1886–1980)

Member of the French National Assembly
- In office November 6, 1945 – December 1, 1955 (10 years, 25 days)
- Constituency: Haut-Rhin

Personal details
- Born: April 30, 1886 Mulhouse, Haut-Rhin
- Died: December 4, 1980 (aged 94) Pau, France
- Party: Popular Republican Movement

Jacques Fonlupt, known as Jacques Fonlupt-Espéraber, was a French politician, born on April 30, 1886, in Mulhouse (Haut-Rhin) and died on December 4, 1980, in Pau (Pyrénées-Atlantiques).

== Biography ==
Jacques Fonlupt was the son of Antoine Fonlupt, an Auvergne-based merchant, and Marie-Louise Busch. After beginning his career as a lawyer in Brest, he married Henriette Esperaber, an associate jurist he met through the Le Sillon movement, on September 17, 1908, in Sauveterre-de-Béarn. Following their marriage, he adopted her name alongside his own.

A French Democratic Confederation of Labour activist, Fonlupt served as a lawyer for Pierre Mendès France during World War II.

In 1943, under the National Council of the Resistance, he was appointed regional prefect for Alsace. However, his opposition to Strasbourg mayor Charles Frey—against whom he regularly ran in elections—prevented him from being appointed as the regional commissioner of the Republic after the Liberation. Instead, the Provisional Government of the French Republic assigned this role to fellow Christian democrat Charles Blondel, while Fonlupt became the prefect of Haut-Rhin. Blondel described him as follows: "Mr. Fonlupt possesses great qualities of heart and intellect. He knows Alsace very well and has a broad legal background. However, he struggles with being subordinate and has a taste for personal power, which complicates both his tasks and those of his superiors."

Fonlupt represented the MRP as a deputy for Haut-Rhin from 1945 to 1955. He also engaged in the France-Algérie Association. In 1947, he gained prominence as the parliamentary rapporteur for the draft law on the Algerian Statute.

He was the father-in-law of Pierre-Henri Teitgen through the latter's marriage to his daughter Jeanne.

He is referenced in Aimé Cesaire's Discourse on Colonialism, in which Cesaire sardonically notes that "Fontlup-Esperaber, who starches his mustache with it [blood], the walrus mustache of an ancient Gaul," alluding to his role in French colonial violence.

== Publications ==
Alsace et Lorraine, hier, aujourd'hui, demain, Bloud et Gay, 1945.
