= Edmond Michelet =

French politician (1899–1970)

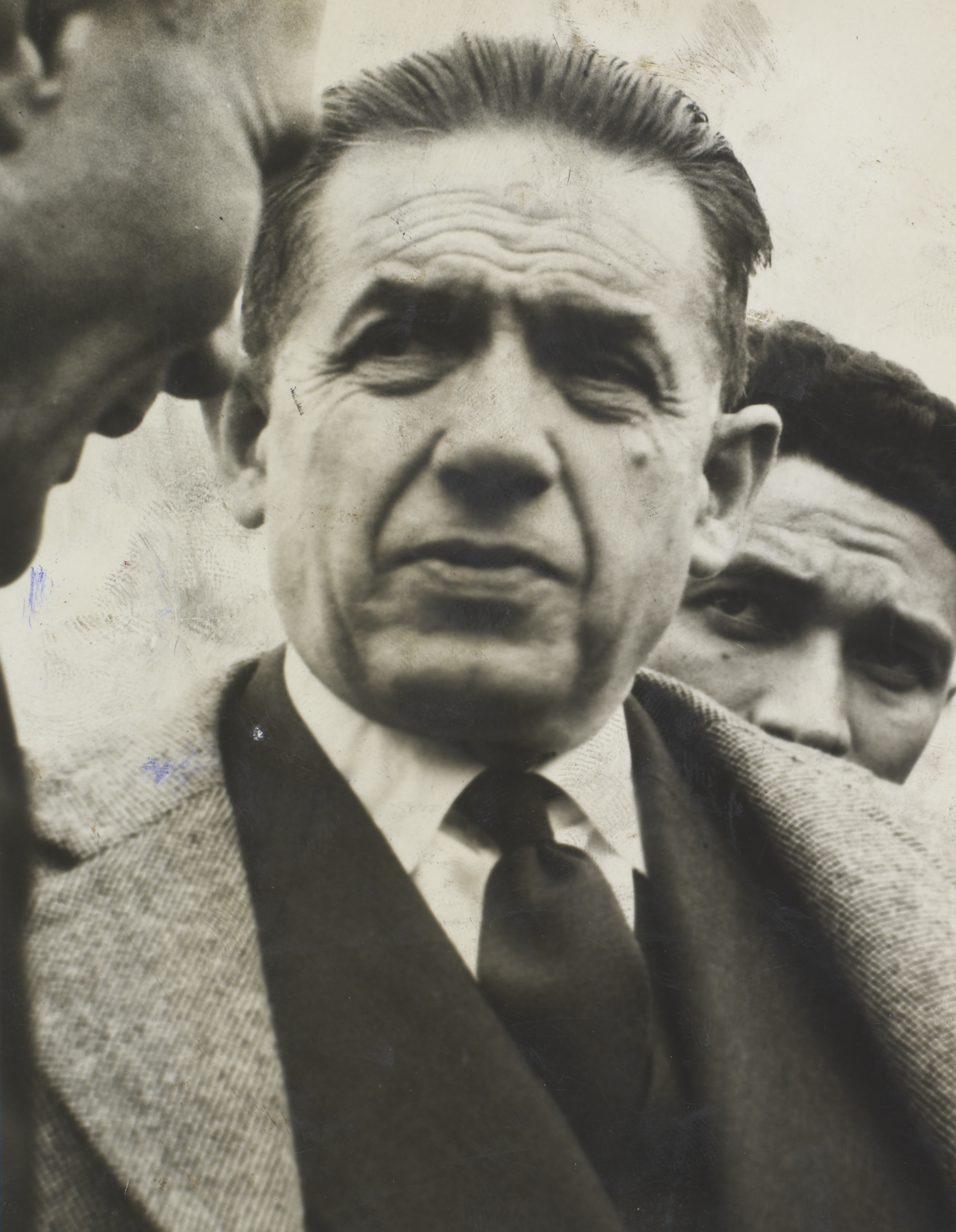

French Minister of Justice
- In office 8 January 1959 – 24 August 1961
- President: Charles de Gaulle
- Prime Minister: Michel Debré
- Preceded by: Michel Debré
- Succeeded by: Bernard Chenot

Personal details
- Born: 8 October 1899 Paris, France
- Died: 9 October 1970 (aged 71) Brive-la-Gaillarde, France

Edmond Michelet (French pronunciation: [ɛdmɔ̃ miʃlɛ]; 8 October 1899 – 9 October 1970) was a French politician. He was the father of the writer Claude Michelet.

On 17 June 1940, he distributed tracts calling to continue the war in all Brive-la-Gaillarde's mailboxes. It is considered to be the first act of resistance of World War II in France, one day before Charles de Gaulle's Appeal of 18 June.

He helped many victims of the Nazis in occupied France, including Catholic philosopher Dietrich von Hildebrand. In 1943 he was arrested and incarcerated at the Dachau concentration camp where he assisted other prisoners during a typhus epidemic and was infected himself. He wore the armband No. 52579 When Dachau was liberated he was still aiding the sick and was the last to leave, on 26 May 1945. (While a prisoner, he was helped by abbé Franz Stock.) He was designated a righteous among the nations in 1995.

He was elected to the French Parliament on 21 October 1945. He was made minister of the Army by Charles de Gaulle in 1946.

He served as Minister of Justice from 1959 to 1961. In 1963, he founded the France-Algeria Association to encourage cooperation between France and the newly independent Algeria.

Michelet was the main collaborator of Abraham Vereide, the leader of the Family fundamentalist organisation, based in the United States.
