= David Hollinger =

American historian

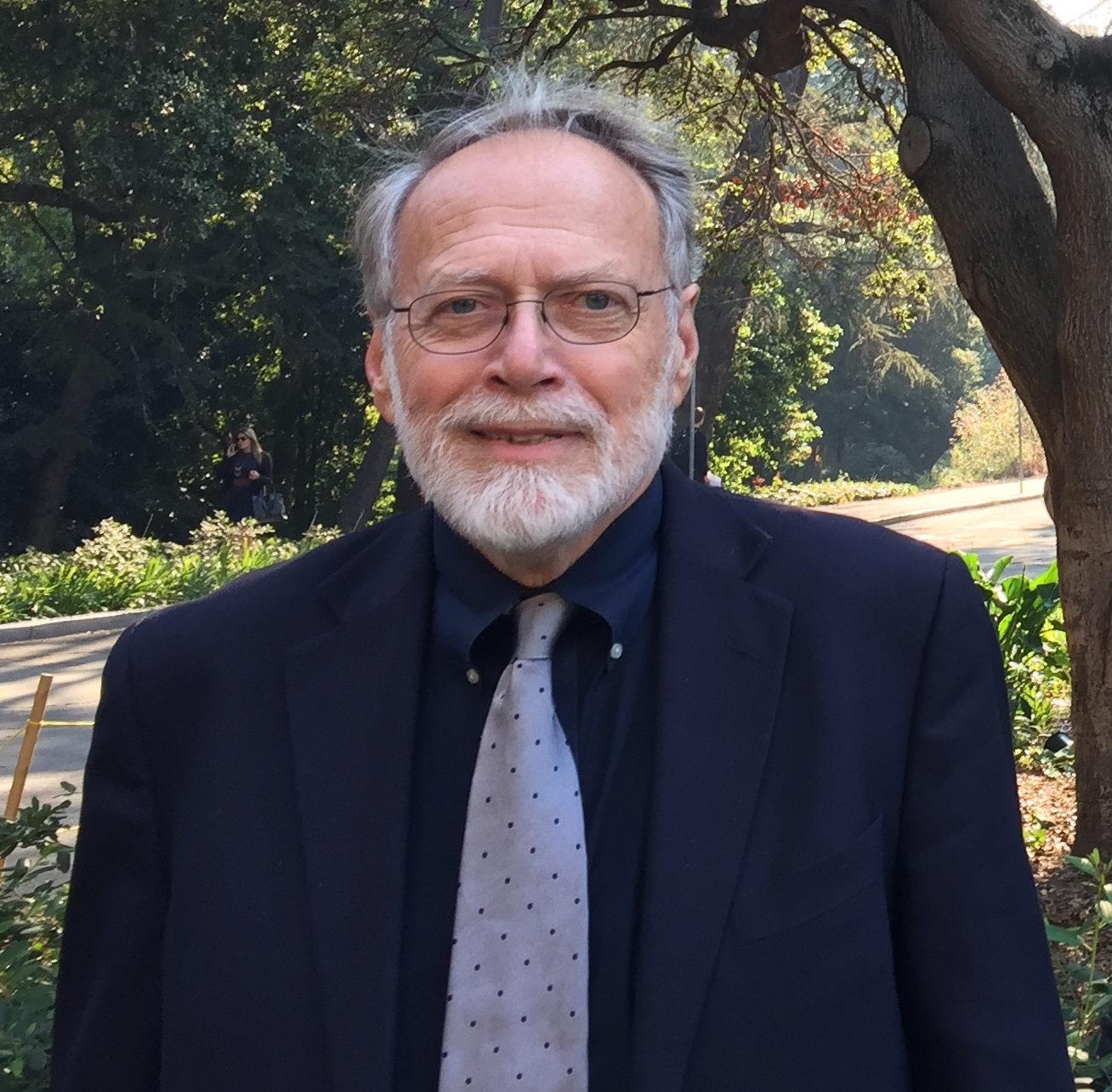
- Born: April 25, 1941 (age 85); Chicago, Illinois, U.S.

Academic background
- Education: University of La Verne, University of California, Berkeley

Academic work
- Discipline: History
- Sub-discipline: Intellectual history
- Institutions: Organization of American Historians, University of California, Berkeley

David Albert Hollinger (/hɑːliŋɡər/) (born April 25, 1941 in Chicago, Illinois) is the Preston Hotchkis Professor of History, emeritus at the University of California, Berkeley. His specialties are American intellectual history and American ethnoracial history.

Hollinger is the author of several books, including Postethnic America: Beyond Multiculturalism (1995), Protestants Abroad: How Missionaries Tried to Change the World but Changed America (2017), and Christianity’s American Fate: How Religion Became More Conservative and Society More Secular (2022).

His influence in the field of religious history was discussed in 2013 in The New York Times.

== Life ==
Hollinger grew up in the Church of the Brethren, a denomination in which his father, grandfather, and great-grandfather had been ministers, but Hollinger has identified himself as an atheist for most of his adult life. He documented his family's history in his 2019 family memoir, When This Mask of Flesh is Broken: The Story of an American Protestant Family (2019) is an account of the Hollinger family’s history and its role in the Brethren community. He detailed his upbringing in the chapter "Church People and Others" from his 2013 book After Cloven Tongues of Fire.

While completing his undergraduate education, Hollinger worked as a part-time sportswriter for the Pomona Progress-Bulletin. Hollinger earned his Bachelor of Arts degree from La Verne College in 1963, and then his Master of Arts degree in 1965 and Ph.D. in 1970, both from University of California, Berkeley. Before joining the Berkeley faculty in 1992, Hollinger taught at the University at Buffalo and the University of Michigan. He was Harmsworth Professor of American History at Oxford University in 2001-2. He retired at Berkeley in 2013.

== Career ==
Hollinger taught at the State University of New York at Buffalo from 1969 to 1977 and the University of Michigan from 1977 to 1992. He then joined the faculty at UC Berkeley in 1992, serving as the Preston Hotchkis Professor of History until his retirement in 2013. Hollinger has been the Ph.D. advisor to people who have become well established as publishing scholars in history, including S. M. Amadae, Jennifer Burns, Daniel Immerwahr, Healan Gaston, Daniel Geary, Nils Gilman, Andrew Jewett, Susan Nance, Kevin Shultz, and Gene Zubovich.

Hollinger was president of the Organization of American Historians in 2010-2011 and was the Harmsworth Professor of American History at the University of Oxford in 2001–2002. He was an elected fellow of The American Academy of Arts and Sciences in 1997. He has been a trustee of the National Humanities Center and of the Institute For Advanced Study. He is an elected member of the American Philosophical Society in 2017.

== Scholarship ==
Hollinger developed an interpretation of American intellectual history based on the accommodation of Protestant Christianity with the Enlightenment and the tension between cosmopolitan and provincial drives. These themes inform “The American Intellectual Tradition”, a standard sourcebook co-edited with Charles Capper across seven editions (1989–2017). The same emphases are found throughout Hollinger’s single-authored books and articles on philosophy, religion, literature, higher education, the ideology of science, and debates over race and ethnicity. His work is known in three subfields: the role of Jews in public life, the origins and dynamics of multiculturalism, and the role of Protestants in public life.

Hollinger’s study of Jewish integration into American culture began with “Morris R. Cohen and the Scientific Ideal” (1975) and expanded in “Science, Jews, and Secular Culture” (1996). The influential of his later essays in this domain were “Rich, Powerful and Smart: Jewish Overrepresentation Should be Explained Instead of Avoided or Mystified,” Jewish Quarterly Review (2004), and “Communalist and Dispersionist Approaches to American Jewish History in an Increasingly Post-Jewish Era,” American Jewish History (2009). Hollinger has argued that Jews, as a culturally conspicuous population of non-Christians, have powerfully diversified American life and have weakened Anglo-Protestant hegemony.

Central to Hollinger’s work in the area of multiculturalism and diversity is his book, Post ethnic America: Beyond Multiculturalism (1995; 2000; 2006). This book placed the late twentieth-century preoccupation with ethnic and racial diversity in a historical context and defended national and universal solidarities against identity politics. Hollinger argued for the recognition of multiple and shifting identities and developed the principle of “affiliation by revocable consent,” encouraging individuals to devote as much, or as little, of their energies to their natal communities. He also edited, for the American Academy of Arts and Sciences, The Humanities and the Dynamics of Inclusion Since World War II (Johns Hopkins University Press, 2006).

During the later period of his career, Hollinger has been primarily concerned with the role of Protestant Christianity in public life. He has focused on the historic tension between the liberal-ecumenical and conservative-evangelical families of Protestants and their very different orientations to pluralist democracy. After Cloven Tongues of Fire: Protestant Liberalism in Modern American History (Princeton University Press, 2013), addressed the writings of William James, Reinhold Niebuhr, and other Protestant intellectuals while arguing that Christianity’s role in the United States had been gradually diminished by a combination of demographic diversity and epistemic demystification. Protestants Abroad: How Missionaries Tried to Change the World but Changed America (Princeton University Press, 2017) demonstrated that the most educated and theologically liberal missionaries sent abroad by American churches often turned against proselytization and devoted themselves to service and to advancing appreciation of foreign cultures. This book confirmed the basic claims of “contact theory” as developed by Gordon Allport and other social scientists. Christianity’s American Fate: How Religion Became More Conservative, and Society More Secular (Princeton University Press, 2022) interpreted the appeal of evangelicalism largely as a safe harbor for Protestants who wanted to be counted as Christian without engaging the challenges of an ethnically and racially diverse society and a scientifically informed culture.

== Personal life ==
Since 1967, he has been married to legal scholar Joan Heifetz Hollinger. He is the father of two children.

== Works ==
- Hollinger, David A.; Capper, Charles (1989). The American Intellectual Tradition: A Sourcebook. 1620-1865. Oxford University Press. ISBN 978-0-19-505774-4.
- Hollinger, David A. (April 1989). In the American Province: Studies in the History and Historiography of Ideas. JHU Press. ISBN 978-0-8018-3826-2.
- Hollinger, David A. (2006-02-28). Postethnic America: Beyond Multiculturalism. Basic Books. ISBN 0-465-03065-3.
- Hollinger, David A. Science, Jews, and Secular Culture: Studies in Mid-Twentieth Century American Intellectual History. Princeton University Press, 1996
- Carson, Cathryn; Hollinger, David A., eds. Reappraising Oppenheimer: Centennial Studies and Reflections. UC Berkeley, 2005
- Hollinger, David A. (2006-03-06). Cosmopolitanism and Solidarity: Studies in Ethnoracial, Religious, and Professional Affiliation in the United States. Univ of Wisconsin Press. ISBN 978-0-299-21663-4.
- Hollinger, David A. (2013-04-21). After Cloven Tongues of Fire: Protestant Liberalism in Modern American History. Princeton University Press. ISBN 1-4008-4599-8.
- Hollinger, David A. (2017-10-17). Protestants Abroad: How Missionaries Tried to Change the World But Changed America. Princeton University Press. ISBN 978-0-691-15843-3
- Hollinger, David A. (2019). When this Mask of Flesh is Broken: The Story of an American Protestant Family. Outskirts Press. ISBN 1-9772-1114-3.
- Hollinger, David A. (2022). Christianity’s American Fate: How Religion Became More Conservative and Society More Secular. Princeton University Press. ISBN 9780691233888

== Presentations and Panels ==
- "The Role of Christianity in Modern US History" with David Hollinger, [Video] (Fall 2023)
- Christianity’s American Fate: How Religion Became More Conservative and Society More Secular (Princeton University, Wilson Center, Oct. 17, 2022)
- Race in the Age of Obama, American Academy of Arts & Sciences, St. Louis, MO (2012)
- Kuhn, the Quotidian, and the Question of God's Death, Center for Science, Technology, Medicine & Society at the University of California, Berkeley (2013)

== Interviews ==
- The Marc Steiner Show: ‘This is the hill to die on for universities’: free speech can survive Trump, but not without a fight (November 13, 2025)
- "Their Generation" The Long View Substack by Julian Zelizer, An interview with David Hollinger (January 30, 2026)
