= Shmuel Trigano =

French sociologist (born 1948)

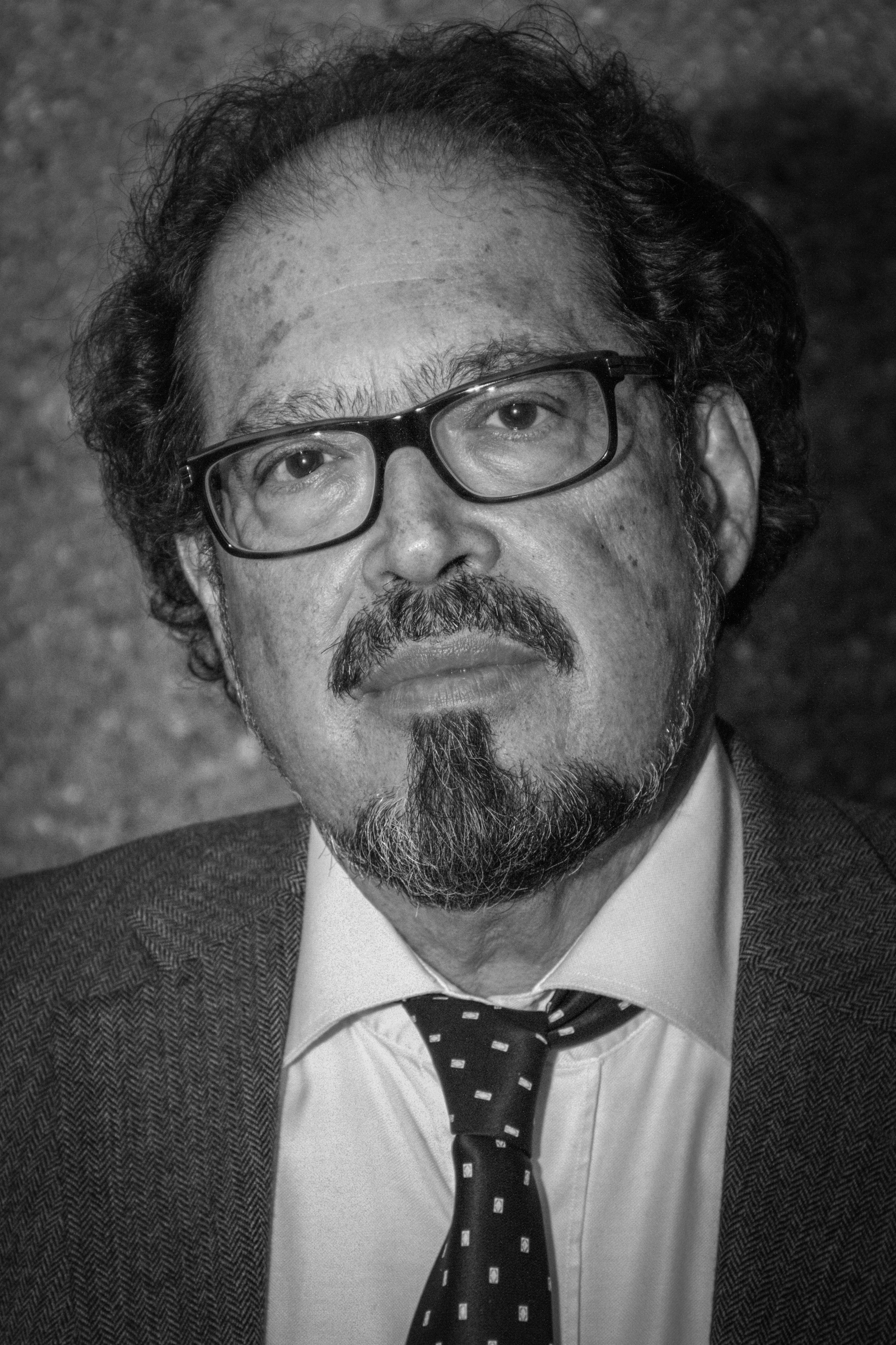
Shmuel Trigano, April 2013

Shmuel Trigano (Hebrew: שמואל טריגנו; born in 1948 in Blida, French Algeria) is a sociologist, philosopher, professor emeritus of sociology at Paris Nanterre University (Chair "Sociology of knowledge, religion and politics" ). He was Tikvah Fund Visiting professor in Jewish Law and Thought at Benjamin N. Cardozo School of Law, New York (2009), and Templeton Fellow at the Herzl Institute (Jerusalem) program "Philosophy of the Tanakh, Midrash and Talmud" (2012–2013), (2015–2017). Elia Benamozegh European Chair of Sephardic Studies, Livorno, Italy (2002).

Trigano is Bachelor of Arts (at the Hebrew University of Jerusalem - Political Science, International Relations), M.A. in Political Science (Paris II University 1977), PhD in political sociology at Paris Nanterre University ("The religious genesis of the Political Modernity in Judaism" - 1981).

Trigano founded two journals, The Journal of Jewish Studies "Pardes, Revue européenne d'études juives", Ed. du Cerf, In-Press Editions (1985- today). Co-founded with Annie Kriegel (1926–1995), and The Journal of Political Ideas "Controverses" Ed. De l'Eclat (2006- 2011).

== Prizes ==
- Edmond Tenoudji Prize for Jewish Education, 1993.
- French Jewry Foundation, Francine and Antoine Bernheim Prize, Prize for the Sciences, 2011.
- The Impertinents 2013 Prize of the newspaper Le Figaro, for his book "La Nouvelle idéologie dominante"

== Books ==
- Le récit de la disparue, essai sur l'identité juive (The tale of the disappeared-She, an essay about Jewish Identity); Gallimard Les Essais 1977, Folio-Gallimard, 2001
- La nouvelle question juive; Gallimard Idées 1982, Folio-Gallimard, 2002
- La république et les juifs; Les Presses d'aujourd'hui 1982
- La demeure oubliée, genèse religieuse du politique (The Forgotten Mansion, a Religious Genesis of Politics); Lieu Commun 1984, Tel- Gallimard 1994, Italian translation Alle radici della modernità, ECIG, 1999
- Philosophie de la loi, l'origine de la politique dans la Tora; Le Cerf 1991, English translation by Gila Walker, Philosophy of the Law. The Political in the Torah, Shalem Press,
- Elazar, Daniel J.; Trigano, Shmuel (1995). How European Jewish communities can choose and plan their own futures. Jerusalem: Jerusalem Center for Public Affairs.
- Un exil sans retour? lettres à un Juif égaré (Exile without return? Letters to a Perplexed Jew); Stock 1996
- La séparation d'amour, une éthique d'alliance (The separation of Love, a Covenantal Ethics); Arléa, 1998
- L'idéal démocratique a l'épreuve de la Shoah(The uniqueness of the Shoa and the democratic universal); Odile Jacob ed. Paris 1999, translation in English by Gila Walker, The Democratic Ideal, The Unthought in Political Modernity, SUNY Press, 2009. Translation in Hebrew by Avner Lahav, Haideal hademokrati bemivhan hashoah, Ben Gurion Institute, Ben Gurion University of the Negev, 2009.
- Le monothéisme est un humanisme (Monotheism is a humanism); Odile Jacob ed. 2000
- Le temps de l'exil (The time of exile); Manuels-Payot, 2001, Rivages poche/Petite Bibliothèque, 2005, translation in Italian, Il tempo dell'esilio, Giuntina, 2010
- Qu'est-ce que la religion? (What is religion?); Flammarion, 2001
- La memoria del popolo scomparso, Salomone Belforte & Co, 2003
- L'ébranlement d'Israël. Philosophie de l'histoire juive (The shaking of Israel, a Jewish Philosophy of History); Le Seuil, 2002, translation in Italian, Il Terremoto di Israele, Giuda Judaica, 2007.
- L'e(xc)lu, entre juifs et chrétiens (The Chosen-Expelled : Between Jews and Christians); Denoël, 2003
- French anti-semitism : a barometer for gauging society's perverseness / an interview with Shmuel Trigano. Jerusalem: Jerusalem Center for Public Affairs. 2004.
- La démission de la république, Juifs et Musulmans en France (The Republican Abdication : Jews and Muslims in France); P.U.F., 2003
- Les frontières d'Auschwitz. Les ravages du devoir de mémoire, (Auschwitz Frontiers, the Ravages of the « Duty of Memory »), Hachette-Livre de Poche, 2005, translated in Hebrew by Avner Lahav (Resling, 2016)
- L'avenir des Juifs de France (The Future of French Jewry), Grasset, 2006
- L'intention d'amour, Désir et sexualité dans Les maîtres de l'âme de R. Abraham Ben David de Posquières, (The Intent of Love, Desire and Sex in Rabad's Baalei Hanefesh), Éditions de l'éclat, 2007.
- Le judaïsme et l'esprit du monde, (Judaism and the Spirit of the World), Grasset, 2011.
- La nouvelle idéologie dominante, (The New Dominant Ideology), Editions Hermann, 2012.
- Le peuple juif, sociologie et philosophie politiques (The Jewish People, Political Sociology and Philosophy), François Bourin ed. 2013.
- L'hébreu, une philosophie, (Hebrew as a Philosophy), Hermann-Philosophie, 2014
- Quinze ans de solitude. Juïfs de France: 2000–2015, (Fifteen Years of Loneliness. French Jews 2000-2015) Berg International, 2015
- Le nouvel état juif, (The New Jewish State), Berg International, 2015

== Main edited books ==
- Le second Israël; Les Temps Modernes, n° 394 bis, Mai 1979
- Penser Auschwitz; Pardès n°9-10, 1989 (THINK AUSCHWITZ)
- La société juive a travers l'histoire; Fayard, 1992-1993, 4 volumes: (JEWISH SOCIETY ACROSS HISTORY)
1. La fabrique du peuple
2. Les liens de l'alliance
3. Le passage d'Israël
4. Le peuple monde
- L'école de pensée juive de Paris; Pardès 23, 1997 (The School of Jewish thinking in Paris)
- Le sionisme face à ses détracteurs; Editions Raphaël, 2002
- L'exclusion des Juifs des pays arabes; Pardès 33, 2003 (The Expulsion of Jews from Arab Countries)
- L'identité des Juifs d'Algérie; Nadir, 2004 (The Identity of Algerian Jews)
- La Cité biblique, Pardès, 40, 2006 (The Biblical City)
- Le monde sépharade, en deux volumes aux Editions du Seuil (2007) (The Spheradic World))
1. L'Histoire (History)
2. La Civilisation (Civilization)
- Noirs et Juifs, mythes et réalités, Pardès (42/2007) (Blacks and Jews, myths and realities)
- La civilisation du judaïsme, L'Eclat, 2012. (The Civilization of Judaism)
- La mémoire sépharade (co-editor, Helene Trigano); In Press, 2000 (Spheradic Memory)
- Voulons-nous encore être humains ? Possibilités et limites d'un nouvel humanisme occidental; Diogene, 2001. (English version: "Do we still want to be Human?"
