= Charles Capper =

American historian (1944–2021)

- Born: September 28, 1944
- Died: July 1, 2021 (aged 76); Minneapolis, Minnesota, U.S.
- Occupation: Historian
- Awards: Bancroft Prize (1993); Guggenheim Fellowship (1994)

Academic background
- Education: Johns Hopkins University (BA 1966); University of California, Berkeley (MA 1968, PhD 1984)
- Doctoral advisor: Henry F. May

Academic work
- Discipline: Historian
- Sub-discipline: Intellectual history; United States history
- Institutions: University of North Carolina at Chapel Hill (1986–2001); Boston University (2001–2021)

Charles Capper (September 28, 1944 – July 1, 2021) was an American historian known for his work on Transcendentalism and his two-volume biography of Margaret Fuller. The first volume of the biography of Fuller, Margaret Fuller: An American Romantic Life, the Private Years, won the 1993 Bancroft Prize. He was a founding co-editor of the journal Modern Intellectual History, 2004–2018.

== Early life and education ==
Capper was born September 28, 1944. He graduated from Johns Hopkins University with a B.A. in history in 1966 and UC Berkeley with an M.A. and Ph.D. in history in 1968 and 1984, respectively. His Ph.D. was supervised by Henry F. May.

At Johns Hopkins, Capper was a chief organizer of a March 17, 1965 Vietnam War protest in Washington, D.C., and a member of the national council of the Students for a Democratic Society, and while at Berkeley he was a leading Trotskyist with the Independent Socialist Club.

== Career ==
From 1986 until 2001, Capper was a professor of history at the University of North Carolina at Chapel Hill. In 2001 he became a professor of history at Boston University, where he stayed until retirement in June 2021.

Seven editions of his source book The American Intellectual Tradition, co-edited with David Hollinger, have been published beginning from 1989.

In 1993, his first book, Margaret Fuller: An American Romantic Life, the Private Years (1992) won the Bancroft Prize. He was awarded a Guggenheim Fellowship in 1994.

In 2002, Capper co-founded the journal Modern Intellectual History with Nicholas Phillipson and Anthony J. La Vopa. It published its first issue in 2004, and he was its longest-serving founding co-editor, 2004–2018.

== Death ==
Capper died in Minneapolis, Minnesota, on July 1, 2021, one day after retirement, from complications of Parkinson's disease.

== Awards ==
- 1987–1988 National Endowment for the Humanities Fellowship
- 1993 Bancroft Prize
- 1994 Guggenheim Fellowship
- 1994–1995 National Humanities Center Fellowship
- 2005–2006 Harvard University Charles Warren Center Fellowship

== Selected works ==
=== Books ===
- Hollinger, David A.; Capper, Charles, eds. (1989). The American Intellectual Tradition (1st ed.). Oxford University Press. ISBN 0-19-505774-0. Two volumes: 1620–1865 and 1865 to the present.
  - Hollinger, David A.; Capper, Charles, eds. (2015). The American Intellectual Tradition (7th ed.). Oxford University Press. ISBN 978-0-19-026232-7. Two volumes: 1630–1865 and 1865 to the present.
- Margaret Fuller: An American Romantic Life. Vol. I: The Private Years. Oxford University Press. 1992. ISBN 978-0-19-504579-6.
  - Margaret Fuller: An American Romantic Life. Vol. II: The Public Years. Oxford University Press. 2007. ISBN 978-0-19-506313-4.
- Capper, Charles; Wright, Conrad Edick, eds. (1999). Transient and Permanent: The Transcendentalist Movement in Its Contexts. Massachusetts Historical Society. ISBN 978-0-934909-76-1.
- Capper, Charles; Giorcelli, Cristina, eds. (2007). Margaret Fuller: Transatlantic Crossings in a Revolutionary Age. University of Wisconsin Press. ISBN 978-0-299-22340-3.

=== Journal ===
- Anthony J. La Vopa, Nicholas Phillipson, Charles Capper, eds. Modern Intellectual History. ISSN 1479-2443
