= Folk high school =

Type of adult education institution

Folk high schools (also adult education center) (Note: Danish: folkehøjskole; Dutch: volkshogeschool; Finnish: kansanopisto, työväenopisto or kansalaisopisto; German: Volkshochschule and (a few) Heimvolkshochschule; Norergian: Bokmål: folkehøgskole; Nynorsk: folkehøgskule; Spanish: Universidad popular; Swedish: folkhögskola; Polish: Uniwersytet ludowy; Hungarian: népfőiskola) are institutions for adult education that generally do not grant academic degrees, though certain courses might exist leading to that goal. They are most commonly found in Nordic countries and in Germany, Switzerland and Austria. The concept originally came from the Danish writer, poet, philosopher, and pastor N. F. S. Grundtvig (1783–1872). Grundtvig was inspired by the Marquis de Condorcet's Report on the General Organization of Public Instruction which was written in 1792 during the French Revolution. The revolution had a direct influence on popular education in France. In the United States, a Danish folk school, called Danebod, was founded in Tyler, Minnesota.

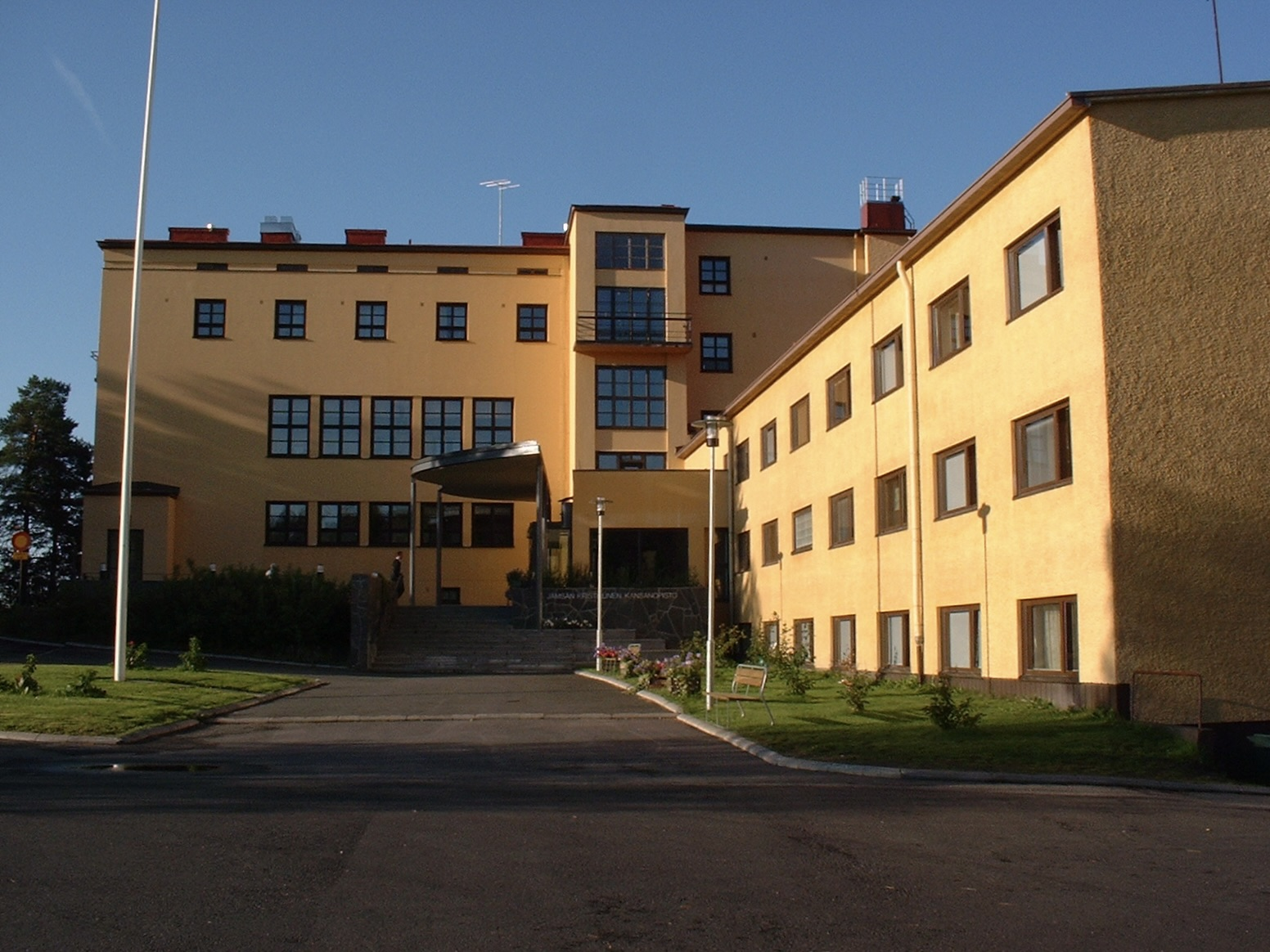
Christian folk high school in Jämsä, Finland

Despite similar names and somewhat similar goals, the institutions in Germany and Sweden are quite different from those in Denmark and Norway. Folk high schools in Germany and Sweden are in fact much closer to the institutions known as folkeuniversitet in Norway and Denmark, which provide adult education. However, unlike the folkeuniversitet, folk high schools in Sweden are not connected with a regular university. The Finnish adult education centers called työväenopisto, kansanopisto and kansalaisopisto (Swedish: arbetarinstitut, literally 'workers' institute') are also part of the adult education tradition. Note that the Finnish kansanopisto and kansalaisopisto are completely distinct institutions and function very differently despite having similar names.

Other countries have also been inspired by Grundtvig's concept of popular education. In Nigeria, the United States, and India, a few schools have been built upon Grundtvig's principles for education.

== History ==
Grundtvig, regarded as the founder of the folk high school, received inspiration for the concept from the English boarding schools, but Grundtvig's focus was not on formal education but on popular education. The idea was to give the peasantry and other people from the lower echelons of society a higher educational level through personal development; what Grundtvig called "the living word". The language and history of the fatherland, its constitution and main industries (farming) along with folk songs should be the guiding principles for an education based on a Christian framework.

The first folk high school was established in 1844 in Rødding, Denmark. The school in Rødding, however, was somewhat aristocratic as chiefly civil servants and rich farmers were enrolled.

Another pioneer for the folk high school was the teacher Christen Kold. His, for that time, highly unorthodox way of teaching gave the folk high schools a broader democratic basis in comparison to the initial religious focus. The teaching took place from November to March because students did farm work the rest of the year. Kold's goal was for students to return to the school regularly in the winter to continue their education. In the beginning only young men could attend the courses, but in 1861 young women also gained access to folk high schools when teaching began being offered from May to July. The men still only attended during winter.

The breakthrough for the idea was the Second War of Schleswig in 1864 when Denmark had to surrender a large part of its territory. This incident allowed the growth of a new Danish consciousness and nationalism based on enlightenment of the people. Denmark's loss of territory to Prussia hit the Danish national consciousness hard, which became a catalyst for a new Danish identity. They established folk high schools all around the country and by 1867 twenty-one folk high schools had opened. Almost everyone working at the folk high schools had been an apprentice of Grundtvig. In 1918 the number of folk high schools in Denmark had reached 68.

Modern folk high schools vary significantly. Some still have a religious focus but most of them are secular. The schools are still Grundtvigian folk high schools which means that their focus is on enlightenment, ethics, morality and democracy although they are not taught explicitly. The Grundtvigian philosophy is embedded in the teaching of various subjects, e.g. the arts, gymnastics and journalism. Most of the schools have an area of expertise, such as sports, music or writing. Since no degree or diploma is awarded at the end, the teaching is freer and more informal than at ordinary educational institutions. Most Scandinavian folk high schools are boarding schools where the students live for from two to six months, though some schools offer programs for an entire year.

== Philosophy ==
The movement started as a row with the old school. Grundtvig fought for a public education as an alternative to the university elite. The folk high schools should be for those wanting to learn in general and to help people form part of human relations and society.

The folk high schools have changed naturally through time, but many of Grundtvig's core ideas about the folk high school are still to be found in the way they are run today. The folk high school of today is engaged in a complex modern reality and influenced both by national and international questions.

One of the main concepts still to be found at the folk high schools today is "lifelong learning". The schools should educate for life. They should shed light on basic questions surrounding life of people both as individuals and as members of society.

To Grundtvig the ideal was to give the students a sense of a common best and focusing on life as it really is. Therefore, Grundtvig never set down guidelines for the future schools or a detailed description of how they should be run. He declared that the folk high schools should be arranged and developed according to life as it is and the schools should not hold exams because the education and enlightenment was a sufficient reward.

The essential element was and is the life at the schools. A folk high school becomes what it is because of the individuals of which it is made. Learning happens across social positions and differences – the teacher learns from the student and vice versa in a living exchange and mutual teaching. For Grundtvig dialogue across differences was essential – the ideal was that people must learn to bear with the differences of each other before enlightenment can be realized.

== Features ==
The character of folk high schools differ from country to country, but usually institutions have the following common features:

- Large variety of subjects
- No final exams
- A focus on self-development
- Pedagogical freedom
- Courses last between a few months and one year, with per-course fees
- No numerus clausus (entrance exams)

Especially in non-German speaking countries, the folk high schools may be boarding schools or may mainly offer courses for adults age 18–30.

== Europe ==
In addition to the Nordic countries and Germany there are also folk high schools in Switzerland, Austria, Poland, and France. The Association for Community Colleges (ACC) advocated for European transnational Folk High Schools.

=== Denmark ===
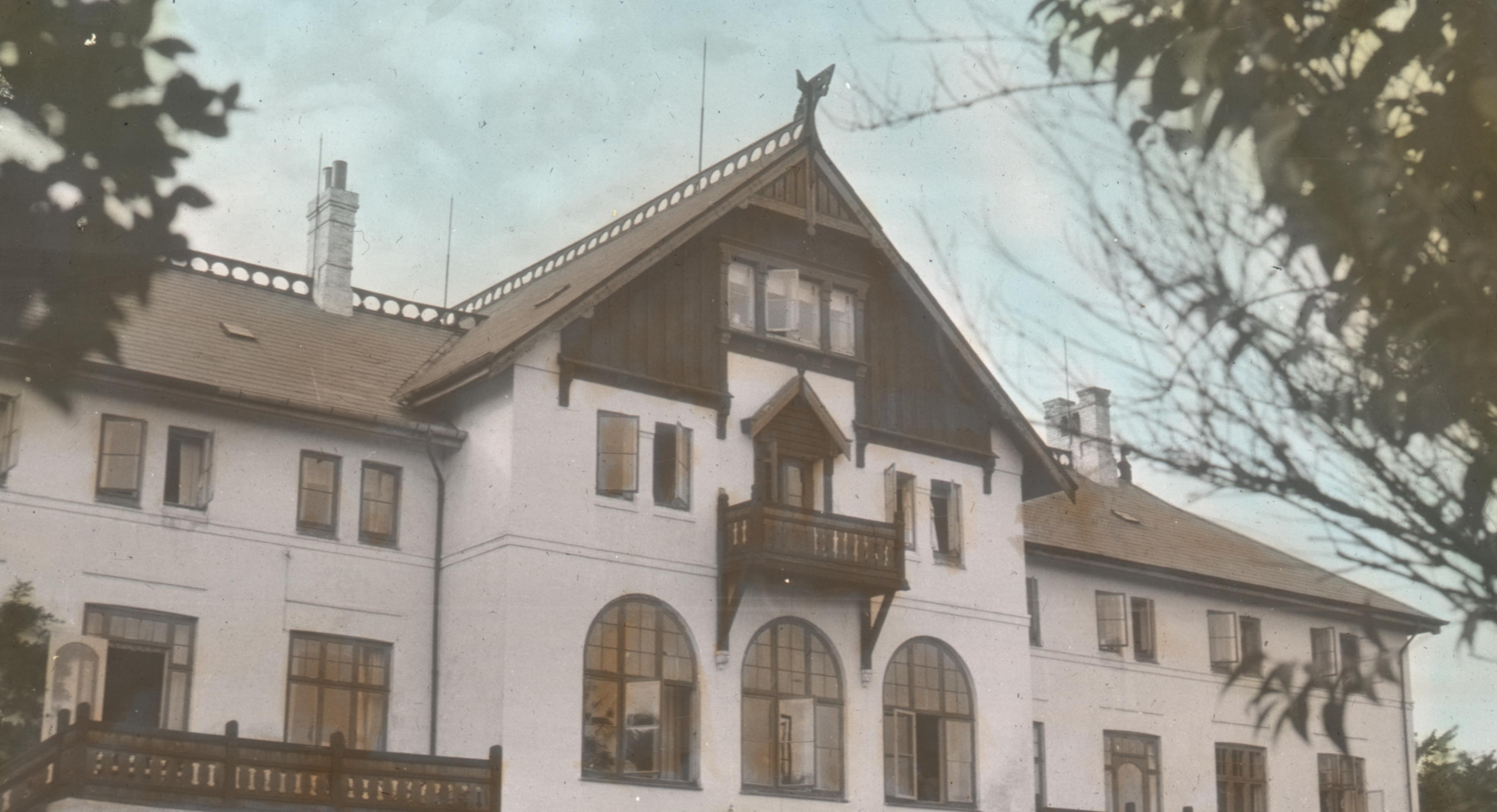
The Grundtvig Folk High School

The first folk high school was founded in Rødding, Denmark, in 1844. It began on the initiative of Christen Kold, who was a follower of Grundtvig. The school was inspired by the need to educate those not fortunate enough to have an education and the poor, or peasantry, who could not spare the time or the money to attend a university. Among the other old folk high schools in Denmark are Testrup Folk High School (founded 1866), Askov Højskole (founded 1865) and Ry Højskole (founded 1892) in Jutland; Vallekilde Folk High School in Zealand (founded 1865), and Rødkilde Højskole on Møn (founded 1866). The International People's College in Helsingør is unique among the Danish folk high schools in that it is the most international one in Denmark, with classes taught in English and teachers and students from countries all around the world attending.

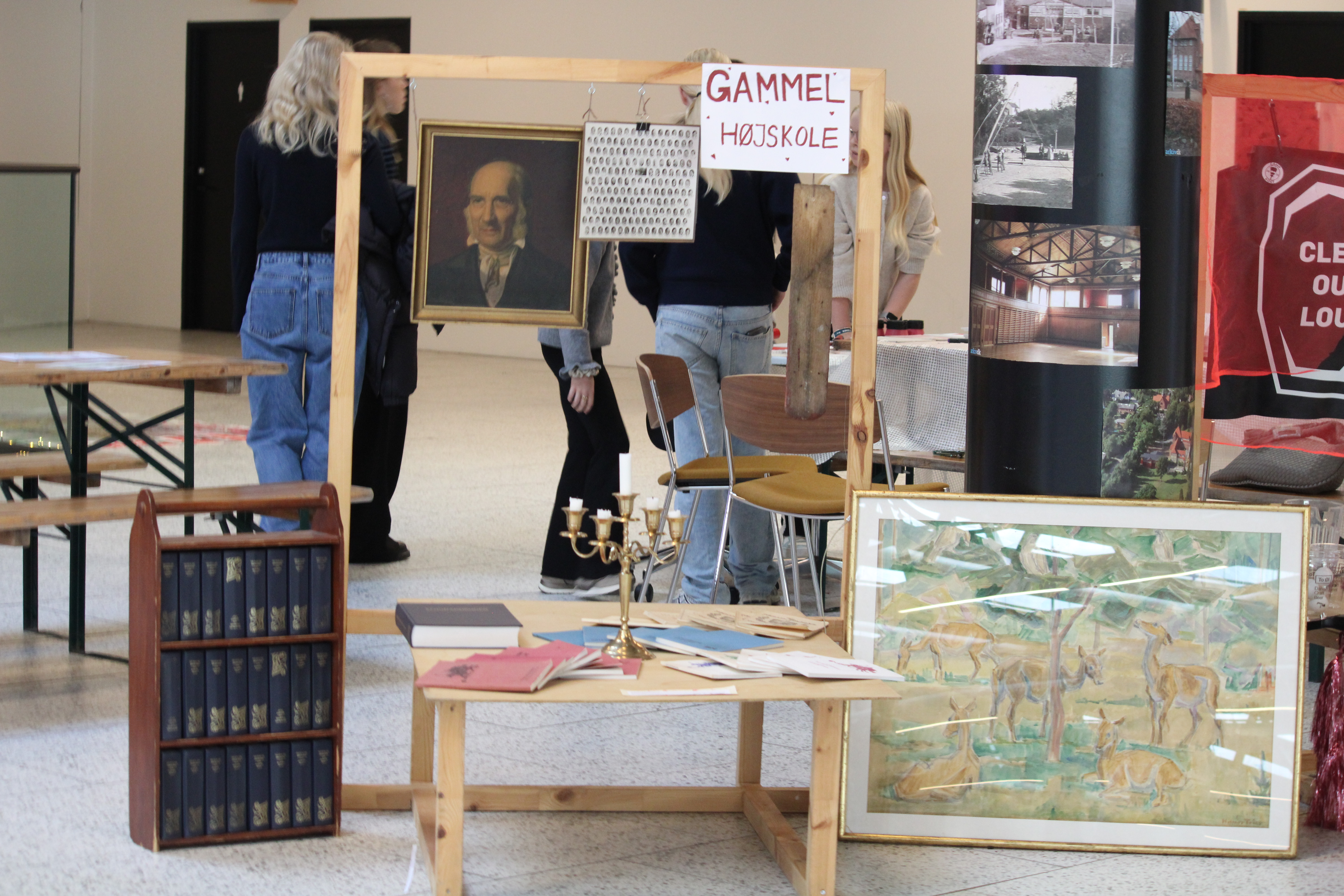
Objects associated with the Danish traditional folk high school on display at Bogforum 2025 in Copenhagen

There are around 70 folk high schools in Denmark. The principal subjects of instruction vary from the creative arts such as music, arts, design, writing, to intellectual courses such as religion, philosophy, literature and psychology. Some schools even have courses that specialize in sports. Tuition varies, but is typically around 1300 Danish kroner per week, including board and lodging.

In recent history, globalization has exercised an increasingly important influence on Danish schools. Many courses are open to foreigners as well as Danes, and many courses include travelling or voluntary stays in other countries as part of the curriculum.

=== Finland ===
In 1889, Sofia Hagman started the first folk high school in Finland in Kangasala. Public, private, secular and religious folk high schools are common in Finland, and there are also worker's high schools, which are governed by the labor movement. There are 184 folk high schools in Finland, with an annual course attendance of 650,000, in 2 million hours of lessons, which are substantial numbers for a country of 5.5 million people. Unlike in Finnish public education, there are tuition fees, per-course and per-lesson fees. The most common subjects are handicraft skills, music, languages, physical education, visual arts, theater and dance. Christian folk high schools offer religious instruction for laymen. The schools offer also courses from the primary and secondary school curriculum, which allows for improving the grades from these levels later in life, even if the student has already graduated.

=== France ===
In 1866, during the Second Empire, Jean Macé founded the Ligue de l'enseignement ("Teaching League"), which was devoted to popular instruction. Following the split between the Anarchists and the Marxists at the 1872 Hague Congress, popular education remained an important part of the workers' movement, especially in the anarcho-syndicalist movement which set up, with Fernand Pelloutier, various Bourses du travail centres, where workers gathered and discussed politics and sciences. The Jules Ferry laws that were passed in the 1880s established free, secular, mandatory public education as one of the founding principles of the Third Republic. In addition, many teachers were strong supporters of Alfred Dreyfus during the Dreyfus Affair of the 1890s. Afterward, some teachers set up free educational lectures on humanist topics in order to struggle against the spread of antisemitism in France.

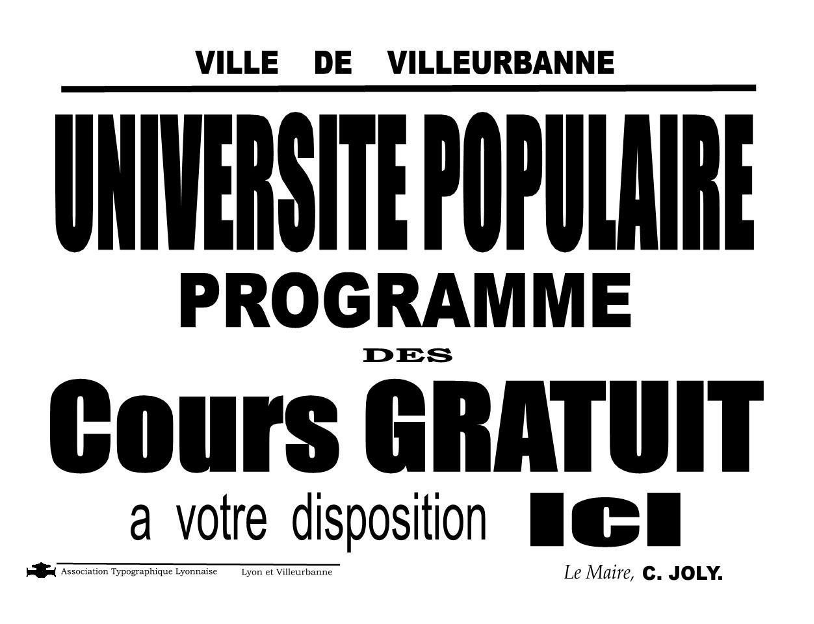
List of lectures, Université populaire - town of Villeurbanne - 1936

In more recent times, following the 1981 presidential election Minister of Education Alain Savary supported Jean Lévi's initiative to create a public high school that would deliver the baccalauréat but would be organized on the principles of workers' self-management (or "autogestion"). This high school took the name Lycée autogéré de Paris (LAP). The LAP was explicitly inspired by the secondary school Vitruve, which opened in 1962 in the 20th arrondissement of Paris (and is still active), Oslo Experimental High School, which opened in 1967 in Norway, and Saint-Nazaire Experimental High School, which opened six months before the LAP. Theoretical influences include the works of Célestin Freinet, Raymond Fonvieille, Fernand Oury, and other theoreticians of the institutional pedagogy, institutional analysis (René Lourau in particular), and institutional psychotherapeutic movements.

=== Germany, Switzerland and Austria ===
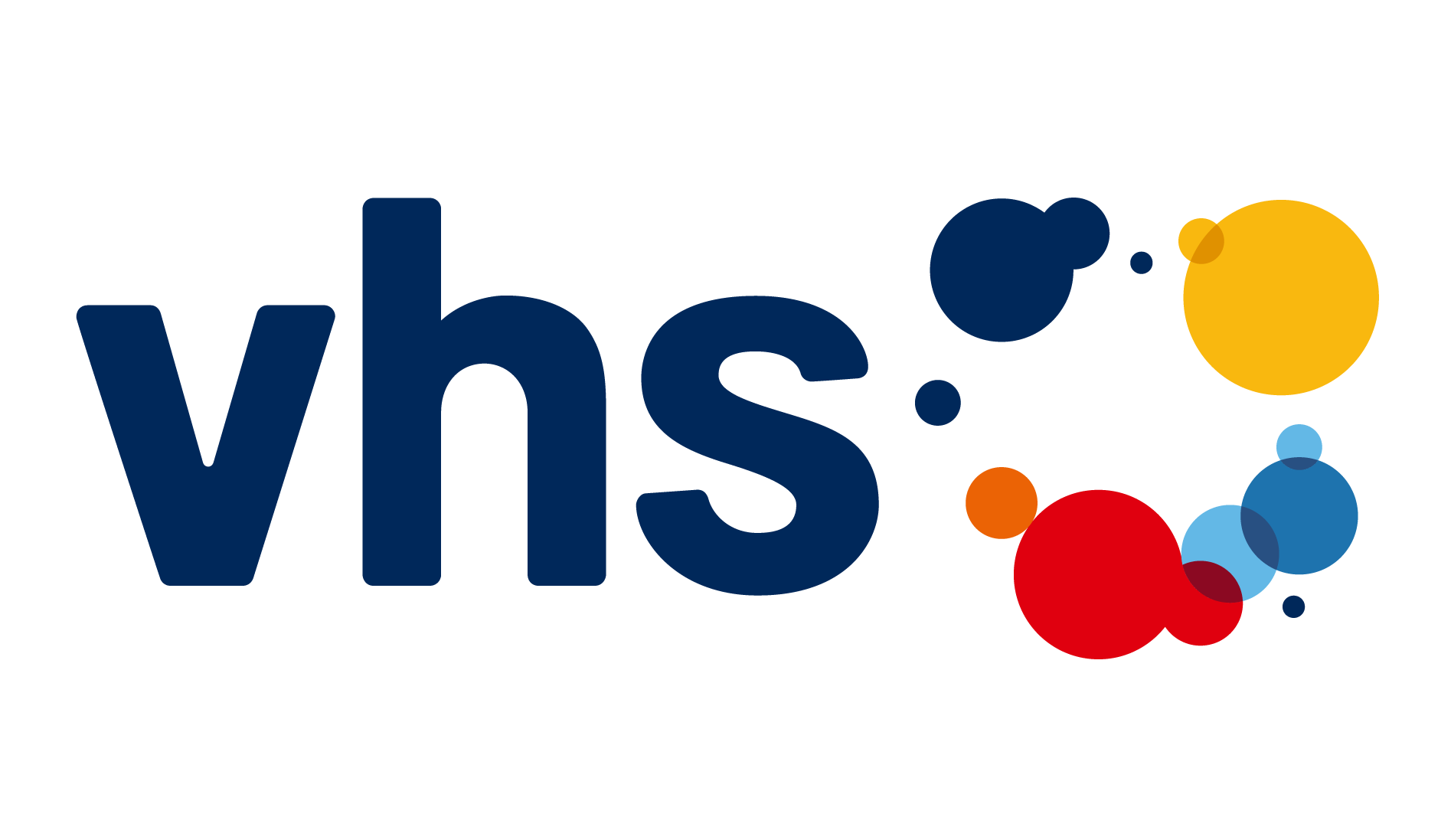
Logo of the association of the German folk high schools

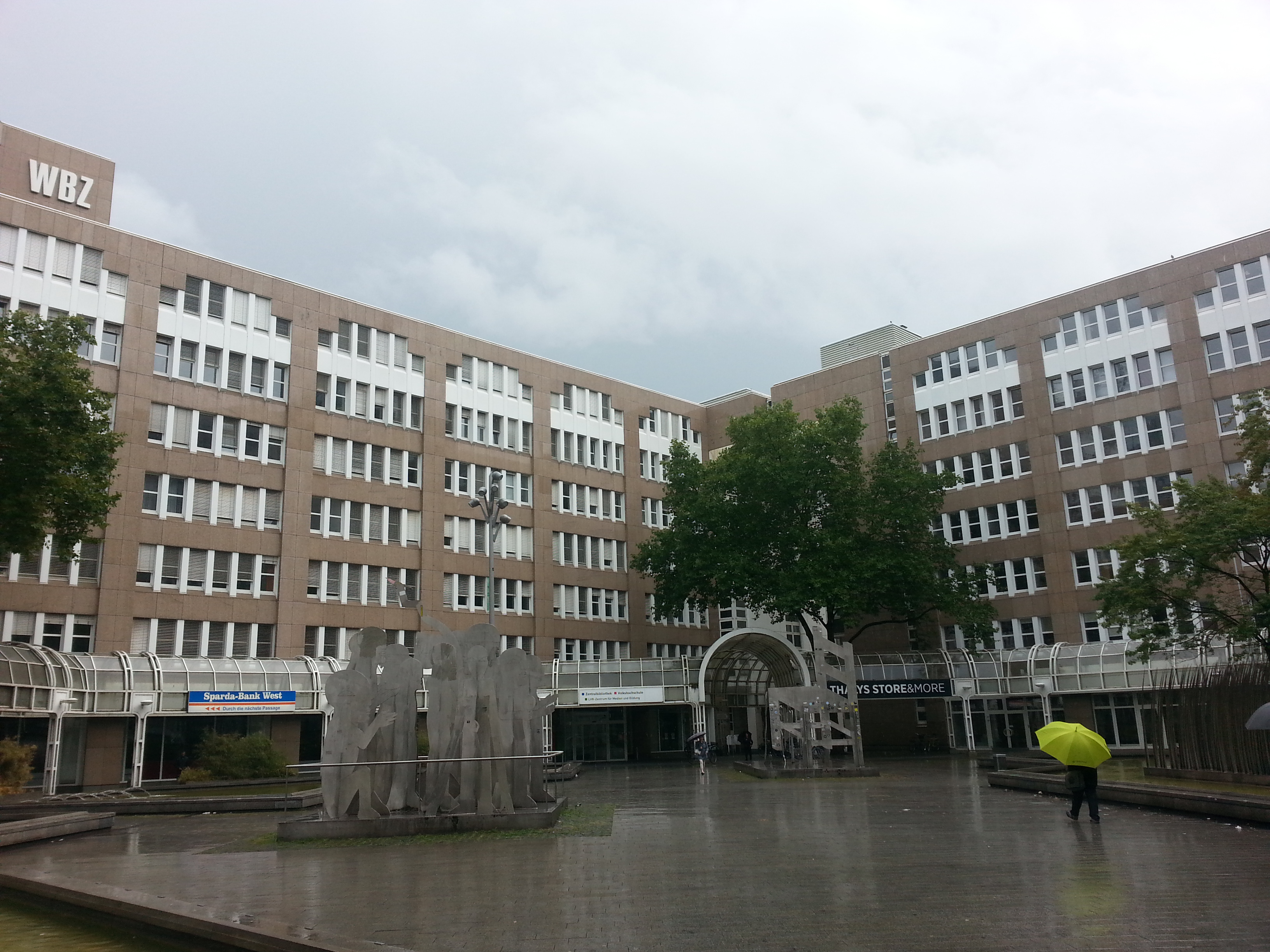
Volkshochschule Düsseldorf, Germany

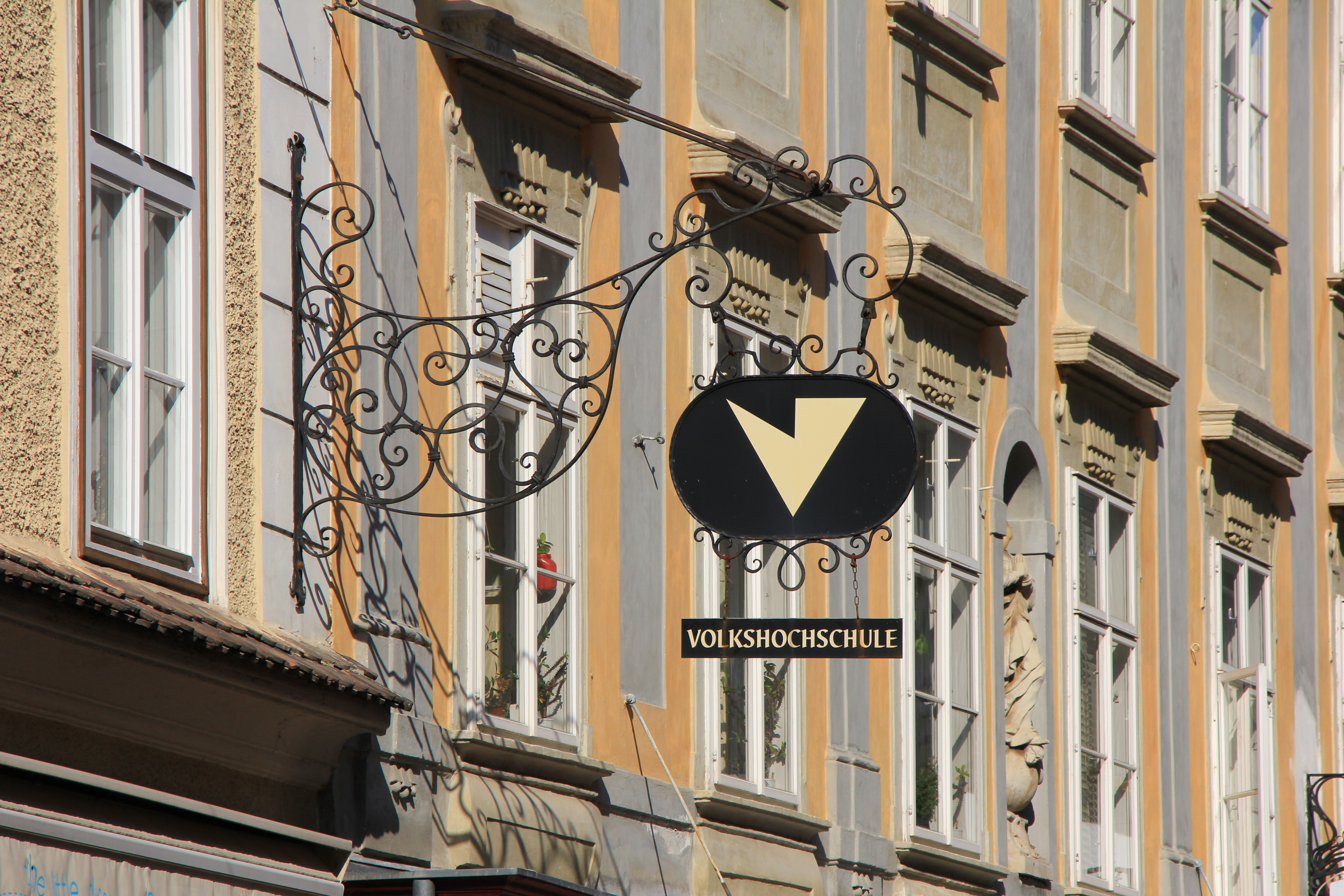
Volkshochschule Krems an der Donau, Austria

Folk high schools in Germany, Switzerland and Austria are usually funded on a local level and provide non-credit courses for adults in:

- general education
- vocational education
- political education
- German as a second language (especially for immigrants)
- integration courses (especially for newly arrived refugees)
- various foreign languages
- various forms of art
- information technology
- health education
- preparatory classes for school exams (especially for the Abitur or Matura)

This type of folk high school is currently most widespread in Germany. Because they offer preparatory classes for school exams, in Germany these schools also function as the equivalent of adult high schools in other countries. Germany also has folk high schools that are boarding schools, called Heimvolkshochschulen.

==== Switzerland ====
In Switzerland, the centers founded by Fritz Wartenweiler—such as "Nussbaum" in Frauenfeld (1919) and Herzberg in Densbüren (1935)—were unable to establish themselves partly due to the lack of educational leave for workers. Conversely, evening folks high school achieved a certain degree of success. The first of these were founded by bourgeois circles in 1919 in Basel, Zurich, Bern, and Lucerne, following the Swiss General Strike.

In French-speaking Switzerland, Ticino, and the Romansh-speaking parts of Grisons, these institutions did not appear until after the Second World War. Geneva was an exception, as a "workers' university" (université ouvrière), linked to the labor movement, had existed there since 1900.

The popular universities, particularly those in Basel and Zurich, emerged as a reaction to the labor movement, which was perceived as a threat to the state. They viewed themselves as civic instruments for integrating the working class into the national community, of which they held an idealized view. Their declared goal was to strengthen democratic capacity by enabling citizens to make informed decisions and by providing the lower social classes with access to university-level knowledge.

Although politically and denominationally neutral and intended to be open to all population groups, this objective was only partially realized. In Basel during the 1923–1924 academic year, only 16% of those enrolled belonged to the working class. This was likely due in part to the academic format in which the courses were delivered. In 1919–1920, 5,336 people attended twenty-one courses in Basel. It was not uncommon to see over 500 auditors at lectures given by university professors on subjects such as natural sciences, medicine, fine arts, music, literature, psychology, or philosophy.

A comparison between the curricula of 1920 and the 1990s reveals a marked increase in language courses and a decline in interest in the natural sciences. While language courses—primarily utilitarian in nature—made up a good half of the offerings in 1995–1996, there was still debate in the 1950s as to whether this type of learning truly belonged in a popular university. Themes related to personal development, continuing professional education, and leisure activities did not find a place in the programs until the 1960s.

The number of popular universities increased during the interwar period. The Association of Swiss Popular Universities (VSV) (Note: German: Verband der Schweizerischen Volkshochschulen, VSV; French: Association des Universités populaires Suisses, AUPS; Italian: Associazione delle Università Popolari Svizzere, AUPS) was founded in 1943 to disseminate the movement's ideals more widely, facilitate the exchange of experiences, support emerging or expanding universities, and represent their interests to federal authorities. The VSV is a member of the Swiss Federation for Adult Learning.

Folks high schools, whether cantonal or regional, are generally private law associations or foundations, often subsidized by cantons and municipalities. They exist in almost all cantons (known as Corsi per adulti in Ticino). Their administration is largely carried out by volunteers. In the 2009–2010 academic year, they organized 10,563 courses attended by 154,753 people. Despite efforts in the 1980s and 1990s to renew their offerings in terms of both content and methods, the popular university still struggles to shed its image as an institution dedicated to an elite culture, catering primarily to the middle-class demographic aged 40–60.

=== Iceland ===
Iceland is home to only two folk schools, the LungA School, an artist-run art school in Seyðisfjörður, which opened in 2014 and the Flateyri Folk School in Flateyri, which opened in 2018.

=== Lithuania ===
Folk high schools (Lithuanian: liaudies universitetas which translates as people's university) were first established in the early 20th century in Lithuania. They became more popular in the interwar Lithuania. In 1937, there were 56 people's universities attended by 160,000 students. Some of the more prominent schools included the People's University of Vincas Kudirka (established in 1923), People's University of Motiejus Valančius (established in 1924 by the Catholic youth organization Pavasaris), People's University of Povilas Višinskis (established in 1926 by Kltūra Company), People's University of Jonas Basanavičius (established in 1928 by the Lithuanian Teachers' Union).

After the Soviet occupation of Lithuania in 1940, the number of people's universities was reduced to eight attended by about 6,000 students. The schools were completely closed after the German occupation in 1941. The people's universities were reestablished in 1958 by the Ministry of Culture of the Lithuanian SSR. They were supervised by a council under the Lithuanian chapter of the Znanie Society. In 1964, there were 18 people's universities in Vilnius that prepared training materials for other people's universities based in cities and districts. The curriculum reflected Soviet ideology. After Lithuania regained independence in 1990, people's universities were closed. Instead, cultural organizations (such as museums or libraries) organize educational activities (lectures, seminars, conferences, etc.).

=== Norway ===
The first folk high school in Norway, Sagatun, was founded in 1864. As of 2012, there were 77 folk high schools spread across the country, thirty of which were Christian schools. Folk high schools provide opportunities in general education, primarily for young adults. These schools are different from lower secondary schools, upper secondary schools, and higher education. All students are eligible for normal financial aid. Some folk high schools are connected to some sort of organization, but a large number of them are owned by a foundation and some are owned by the county. Most courses last for one year, but a few schools give a second year course. Common course options include outdoor skills, land use skills, the arts such as photography or painting, music such as jazz or rock, Norwegian language and culture, and travel skills.

=== Poland ===
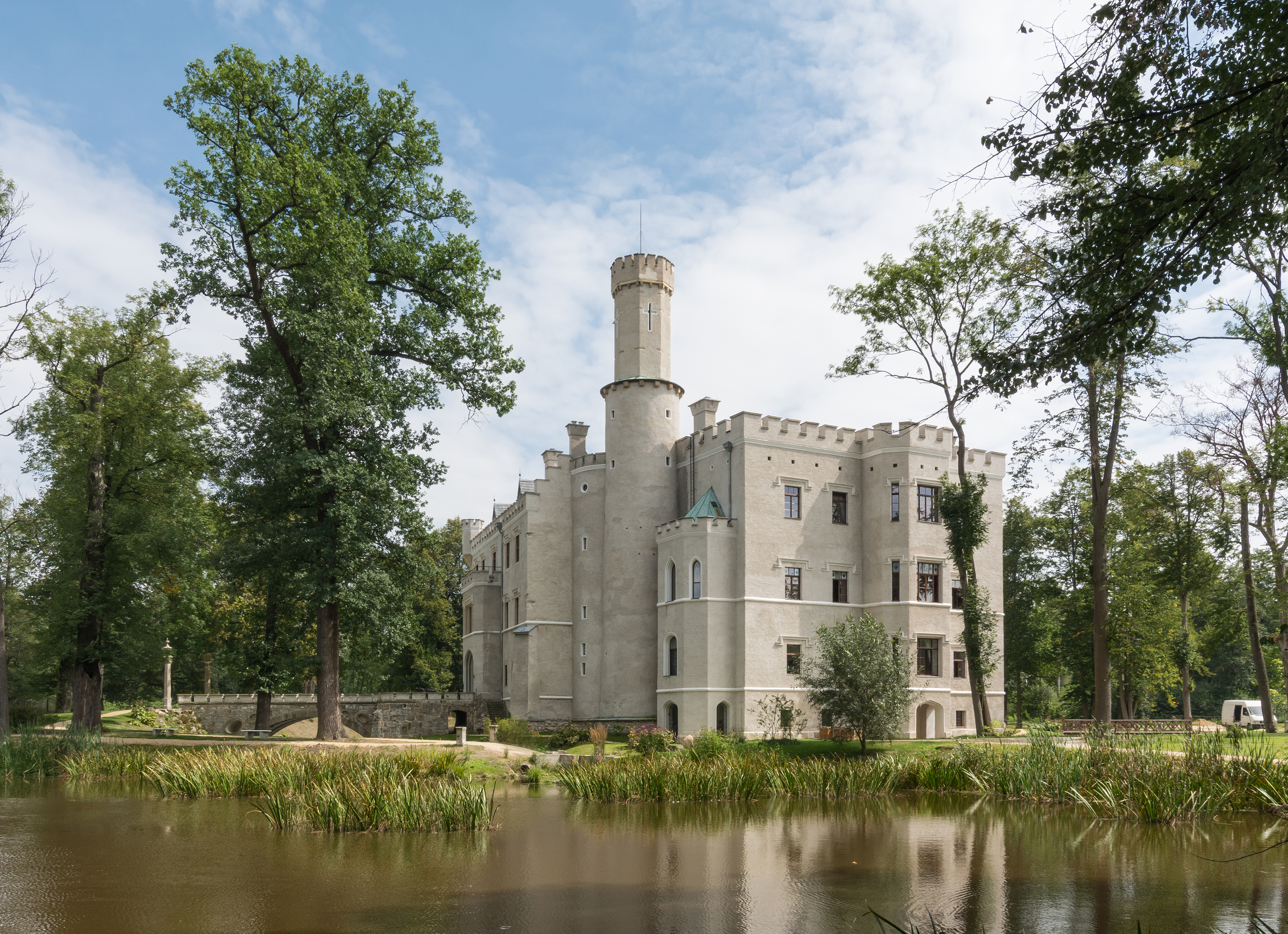
Karpniki Castle, location of the Słoneczna Szkoła folk high school in 1946–1949

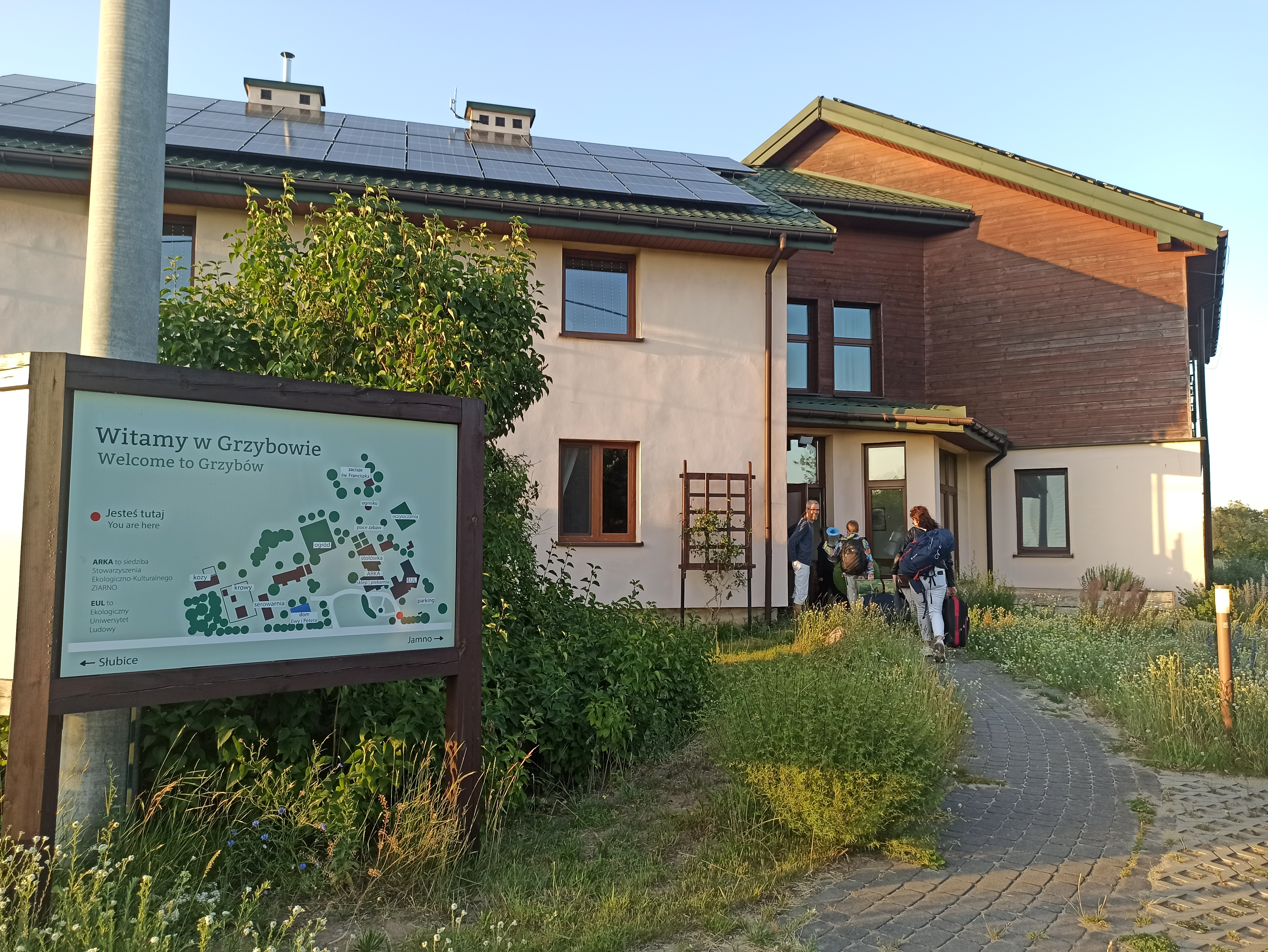
Environmental Folk University (Ekologiczny Uniwersytet Ludowy) in Grzybów (Poland)

In 1910, the Przegląd Oświatowy magazine published by the People's Libraries Society featured an article by Idzi Świtała, in which he reported on the success of Danish folk high schools in fostering the prosperity of the Danish countryside. This inspired Polish activist Antoni Ludwiczak to establish a similar school in partitioned Poland, also for Polish patriotic education in view of the Germanisation policy of the German authorities. The establishment of the school was delayed by World War I. The first Polish folk high school was eventually established in 1921 in Dalki after the restoration of independent Poland. The second folk high school was founded in 1924 in Szyce near Kraków, and many more were founded in the interbellum and after World War II. As of May 1948, there were 63 folk high schools in Poland.

=== Spain ===
A Universidad popular means any competent educational institution such as those established by municipalities, interest groups, charitable associations and social organizations to promote the popular education of theoretical and practical knowledge directly to the whole population, especially to industrial workers (proletariat), rural farm workers (campisinos), emigrants, and citizens with special needs who do not have convenient access to regular, formal educational facilities,

=== Sweden ===
The first folk high schools in Sweden were established in 1868. The first school was open only to men, but already in 1870, the first folk high school for females was founded by Fredrique Paijkull. Swedish folk high schools receive public funding from the Swedish government to support four goals: strengthening democracy, personal development, creating educational equality, and promoting interest and participation in culture.

As of 2023, there are 156 folk high schools throughout the country, most of which are situated in the countryside, often in remote areas. Tuition is free, and the students are eligible for normal financial aid for expenses such as accommodation and other school costs. Students can either study for a general qualification, which makes them eligible to study at university, or a specific subject such as arts, crafts, film, theatre, music or design to gain practical experience.

Some schools, for example Södra Vätterbygdens Folkhögskola near Jönköping, cooperate with schools in other countries and have an exchange student program. A comprehensive overview of the programs offered at all Swedish folk high schools between 1952-2019 is provided in an open data repository and the central page for applying to folk high schools is folkhogskola.nu.

== Nigeria ==
In 1998, the Grundtvig Movement of Nigeria led by Dr. Kachi Ozumba Snr. established Grundtvig International Secondary School, an independent co-educational secondary school built upon Grundtvig's principles for education.

== United States ==
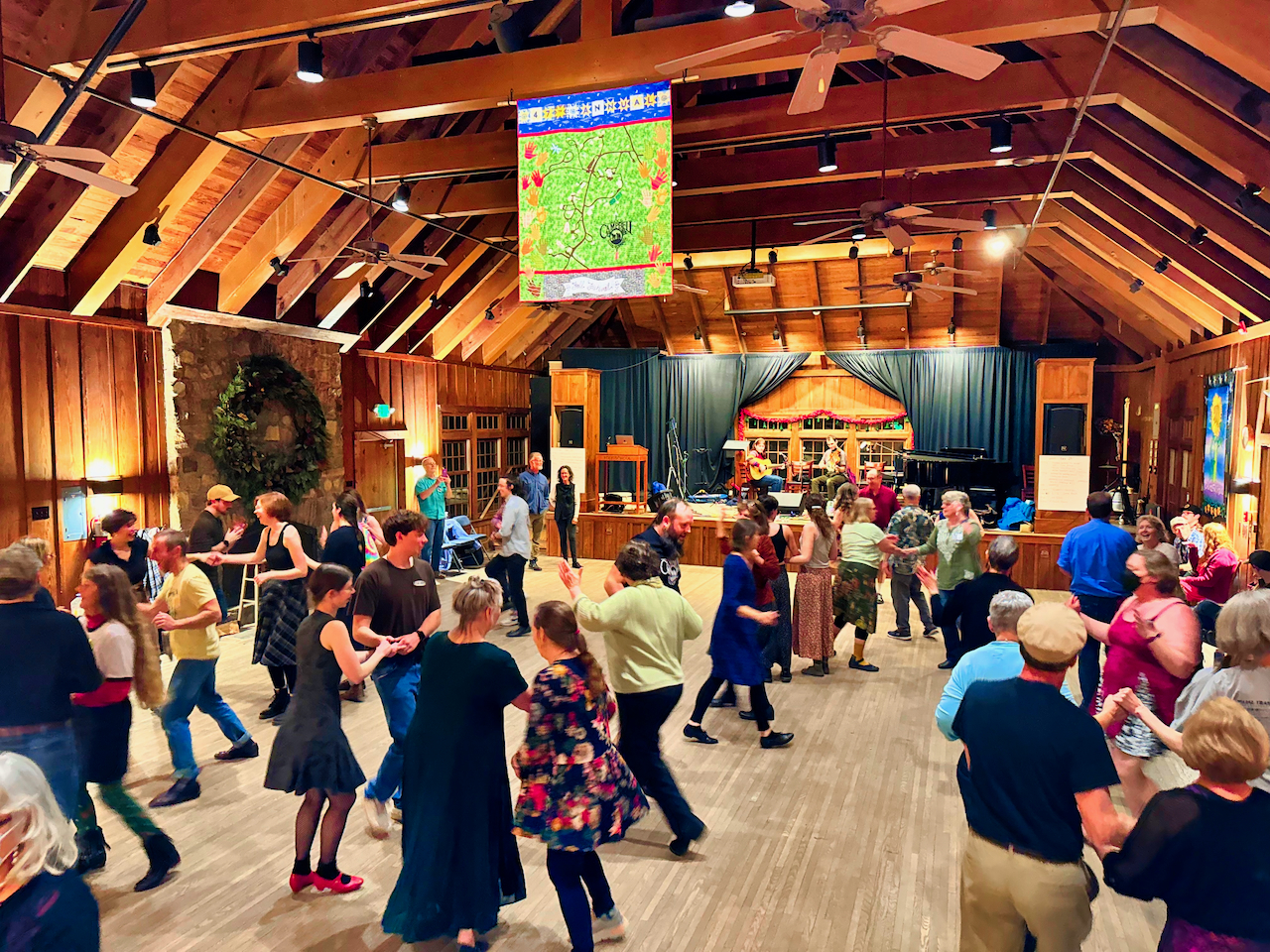
Students learn to contra dance at the John C. Campbell Folk School in North Carolina

Americans John C. Campbell and Olive Dame Campbell helped create a folk high school in rural Appalachia based on observations of European folk high schools. The John C. Campbell Folk School opened in 1925 in Brasstown, North Carolina, and it is still offering classes today. Students can learn American traditional arts and crafts, including blacksmithing, ceramics, cooking, jewelry, dance and music.

Myles Horton, who co-founded the civil rights-focused Highlander Folk School in New Market, Tennessee in 1932, was also inspired by the Danish folk high school movement, as can be read in his autobiography The Long Haul.

A contemporary wave of folk school founding in the United States began in the late 1990s and earlier 2000s. At the beginning of the 1990s, there were only twelve active folk schools. Historically in the United States, only one to two such organizations were founded each decade; however, during the 1990s, this pattern began to change. Nine folk schools were founded in the late 1990s and by 2010 an additional twenty-two. As of 2019, the Folk Education Association of America reported over ninety-four active folk schools in twenty-five states. These new folk schools, largely modeled after the John C Campbell Folk School, work to strengthen their communities through the practice and sharing of place-based cultural traditions and craft.

== See also ==
- Education in Denmark
- N. F. S. Grundtvig
- Community college
- Secondary modern
- Internationaler Bund
- Village Institutes
