= Lycée innovant de Paris =

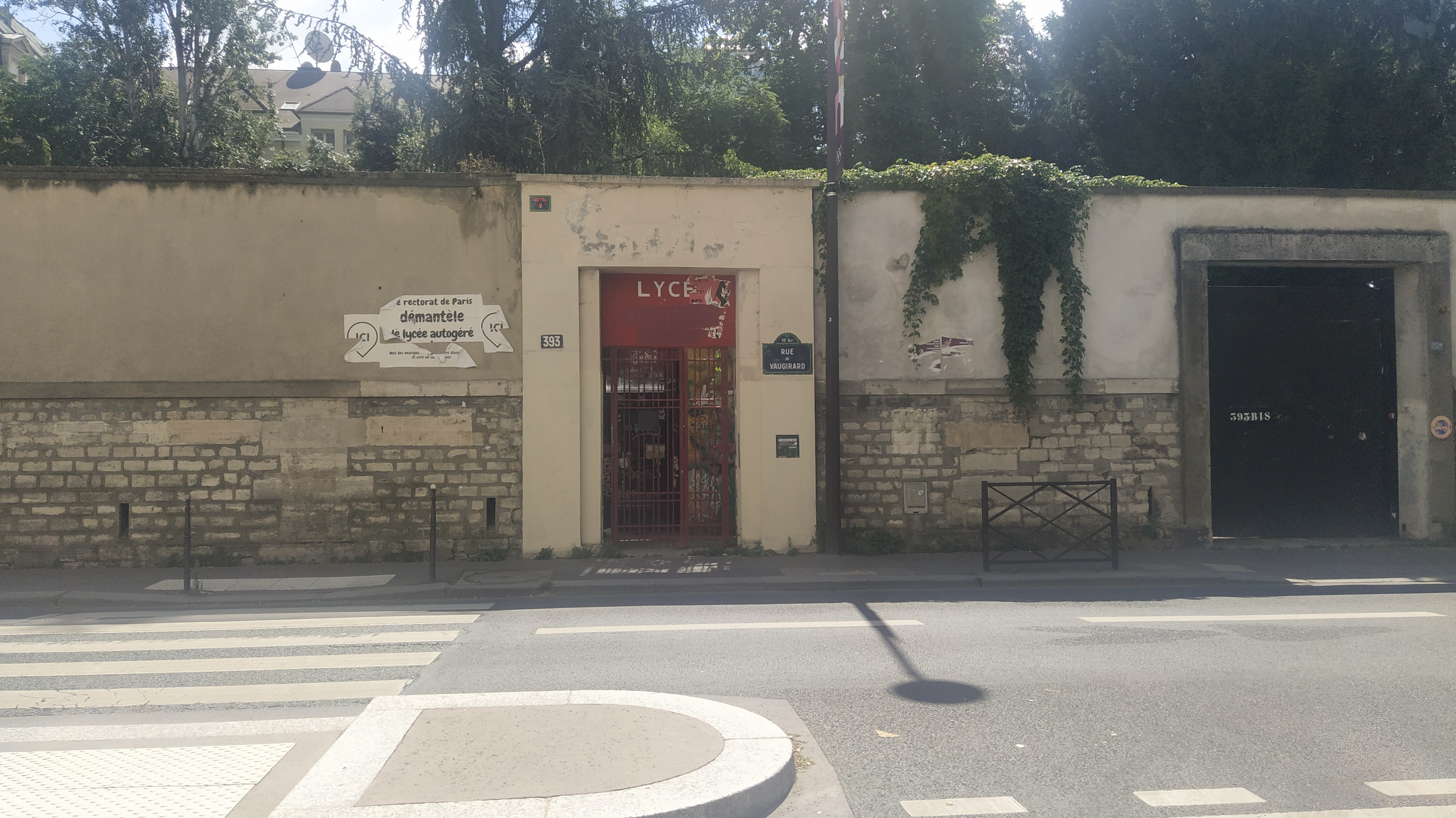
- Entrance to the school grounds

Location
- 393, rue de Vaugirard; 393 rue de Vaugirard, Paris; Paris, 75015; France
- Coordinates: 48.834843°N 2.292033°E

Information
- Former names: Lycée autogéré de Paris
- School type: Établissement public local d'enseignement (EPLE) Lycée (high school)
- Established: 1982
- Authority: Académie de Paris
- Superintendent: Académie de Paris
- Staff: 5
- Faculty: 22
- Grades: 3
- Age range: 15 - 21
- Enrollment: 126 students
- Campus type: urban
- Website: lyc-innovant.ac-paris.fr

The Lycée Innovant de Paris (LIP) is an experimental high-school created in 2024, following the termination of a previous experimental project called the Lycée Autogéré de Paris (LAP), which had been created in 1982 by Education Minister Alain Savary.

Teachers and students (in some way "breaking" with the education system) are the foundation, the "initiator" was Jean Lévi. LAP teaches adolescents and young adults, aged 15 to 21, as an alternative to the Education in France.

The name of the school literally translates to Paris Innovative High School and its former name translates to Paris Self Managed High School.

== History ==
=== Job cuts ===
In 2011, during parity meetings of the rectorate of Paris, where the allocation of teaching posts for each establishment was decided, LAP were informed of the loss of five posts (out of a team of 25) from 2011, threatening the closure of the establishment. In reaction to this news, the lycée mobilised and managed to save four and a half of the jobs. In 2015, faced with further mobilisation of staff and students, the remaining half-post was reallocated to the lycée. Therefore, the lycée kept its 25 teaching staff.

=== Incident ===
In March 2018, the lycée autogéré de Paris was disturbed by far-right militants of the Groupe Union Défense (GUD), who threatened to infiltrate the establishment and create incidents. The lycée filed notice leading to, one year in prison, of which six months are suspended by the Paris prosecutor's office for the two defendants.

== Teaching ==
The lycée autogéré de Paris was inspired by preexisting teaching experience, particularly from the network of experimental schools and colleges created in the 1960s and 1970s, such as the école élémentaire Vitruve opened in 1962 in the 20th arrondissement of Paris (still in place) and Oslo Experimental School, opened in 1967 in Norway. They also looked at the lycée expérimental de Saint-Nazaire, which had opened six months earlier in Saint-Nazaire.

Among the theoretical references, they looked at Célestin Freinet and his colleagues in the Freinet Modern School Movement, but also took inspiration from the theories of the "dissidents", who studied institutional pedagogy - Raymond Fonvieille and Fernand Oury. Nevertheless, the lycée autogéré de Paris leaned closer to the self-management ideals of Fonvieille, than the psychoanalytical tendencies of Oury.

From a practical point of view, the texts of scholars Georges Lapassade and Michel Lobrot promote this type of experience ("groups, organisation, institution" for the former, "institutional pedagogy" for the latter).

The pedagogy of LAP also relies on the work of institutional psychotherapy (René Lourau and Félix Guattari).

In practice, there is a conciliation between the different theories and practice, and the entire establishment is key to making it work.

== Function ==
In the lycée autogéré de Paris, there are three types of members:

- salaried teachers, responsible for experience vis-à-vis the outside world;
- a "specialist", a worker who carries out maintenance of the grounds, but who trains students who want it;
- the students, there to acquire a secondary education.

The participation of all in the actions and decisions that affect the life of the establishment is particularly sought after. Self-management is translated into (for the entire population of the establishment) structures such as grassroots groups, commissions, general management meetings, and a general assembly. In practice, LAP works so that life inside its premises is decided and executed "as much as possible" by all members of the community. The experience is run by a team of teachers who work in self-management: a teacher volunteers to work in the establishment, and is chosen by members of the team.

For each teacher, paid by the National Education, participation in different areas is imperative. The participation of every student is encouraged, but not mandatory. According to LAP, this participation creates conflict with other projects: obtaining the baccalauréat, earning money, carrying out artistic projects, etc. Students are free to attend classes. For some, the inspiration is a "cooperative" ideology (voluntary membership), for others, a "consumerist" attitude, for others, "desire".

Among the management, there is a team meeting, at least two hours per week, in the form of collegial leadership. Difficulties are analysed collectively and the analysis contributed to training all members of the group. The lycée was considered by the Ministry as a pointer for the whole French education system, a "guide", to allow for the understanding of the system by the National Education.

A very comprehensive "school project" is published each year by the lycée team and gives detailed information about its operation. Contacts with a range of self-management companies have been developed since 2005 with exchange of alternative practices and ideas ("REPAS").

== Results and rankings ==
A ranking published by the magazine L'Étudiant in January 2009 gave the level of obtaining the Baccalauréat in the lycée at 26%, ranking it, according to the magazine, last of the 1871 lycées in France.

In 2013, a ranking published in the magazine Le Monde again ranked the lycée last in France in terms of added value compared to similar lycées in the academy, and second-last in bac results with a rate of 30%.

In 2015, the lycée ranked 109th out of 109 at départemental level in terms of teaching quality, and 2285th at national level. The ranking is based on three criteria: the level of bac results, the proportion of students who obtain their baccalauréat having spent the last two years at the establishment, and added value (calculated based on the social origin of students, their age, and their national diploma results).

In 2018, an article in Figaro stated that in the lycée, the level of bac results was around 40%,

well below the national average (88%). However, "if they didn't come here, they wouldn't have gone to school" said [a] teacher

—

.

The results are relative to the school, partly as students are not obliged to attend the courses, and also because the lycée is as much about encouraging students to take part in cultural activities (photography, theatre...) to which they may never have had access, as it is about gaining the baccalauréat.

== Alumni ==
- Mélaka, comic book artist.
- Miko, presenter and director.
- Emmanuel Perrotin, Art dealer, gallerist.

== Annexes ==
=== Bibliography and sources ===
- Romain, from Mélaka, L'Association, coll. « Mimolette », 2003.
  Bande dessinée autobiographie ayant le lycée pour cadre.
- Papantoniou, Maria (28 January 2010), Éléments d'une analyse institutionnelle du Lycée Autogéré de Paris (LAP) réflexion théorique et recherche ethnographique, archived from the original on 19 April 2015
  Thèse de doctorat en sciences de l'éducation rédigée sous la direction de Patrice Ville à l'université Paris-VIII
- Une fabrique de libertés, éditions REPAS, 2012, BnF 42696331.
  Ouvrage rédigé par les enseignants et des élèves du lycée autogéré de Paris à l'occasion du trentième anniversaire de l'établissement.
- LAP ! Un roman d'apprentissage, by Aurélia Aurita, Les Impressions nouvelles, 2014.
  Reportage en bande dessinée après un an d'immersion.
- Pierre Bafoil, Des militants d’extrême-droite attaquent le Lycée Autogéré de Paris, Les Inrockuptibles, 24 March 2018, .

=== Filmography ===
- Bernard Nauer, « Des lycées de rêve ? », documentary shown on France 2 in the show Envoyé spécial on 29 August 1996.
- Marina Galimberti, Grégory Gouband, Sapna Rema Hari, LAP, Centre média local de Seine-Saint-Denis, 2013, BnF 43715828.

=== See also ===
- Lycée expérimental de Saint-Nazaire
- Collège lycée expérimental d'Hérouville-Saint-Clair
- Collège expérimental
- Education in France

=== External links ===
- Official Site
- Le Grand Classeur du LAP
- Exemple de projet d'établissement
