= Popular education =

Education out of traditional schooling systems, aiming at transforming society

Popular education is a concept grounded in notions of class, political struggle, critical theory and social transformation. The term is a translation from the Spanish educación popular or the Portuguese educação popular. The term 'popular' in this case means 'of the people'. More specifically 'popular' refers to the 'popular classes', which include peasants, the unemployed, the working class and sometimes the lower middle class. The designation of 'popular' is meant most of all to exclude the upper class and upper middle class.

Popular education is used to classify a wide array of educational endeavors and has been a strong tradition in Latin America since the end of the first half of the 20th century. These endeavors are either composed of or carried out in the interests of the popular classes. The diversity of projects and endeavors claiming or receiving the label of popular education makes the term difficult to precisely define. Generally, one can say that popular education is class-based in nature and rejects the notion of education as transmission or 'banking education'. It stresses a dialectic or dialogical model between educator and educand. This model is explored in great detail in the works of one of the foremost popular educators of the mid-20th century, Paulo Freire.

Though sharing many similarities with other forms of alternative education, popular education is a distinct form in its own right. In the words of Liam Kane: "What distinguishes popular education from 'adult', 'non-formal', 'distance', or 'permanent education', for example, is that in the context of social injustice, education can never be politically neutral: if it does not side with the poorest and marginalised sectors- the 'oppressed' – in an attempt to transform society, then it necessarily sides with the 'oppressors' in maintaining the existing structures of oppression, even if by default."

== Europe ==
Popular education began at the crossroads between politics and pedagogy, and strongly relies on the democratic ideal of the Enlightenment, which considered public education as a main tool of individual and collective emancipation, and thus the necessary conditions of autonomy, in accordance with Immanuel Kant's Was Ist Aufklärung? (What is Enlightenment?), published five years before the 1789 French Revolution, during which the Condorcet report established public instruction in France.

Jean-Jacques Rousseau's L'Emile: Or, On Education (1762) was another obvious theoretical influence, as well as the works of N. F. S. Grundtvig (1783–1872), at the origins of the Nordic movement of folk high schools. During the 19th century, popular education movements were involved, in particular in France, in the Republican and Socialist movements. A main component of the workers' movement, popular education was also strongly influenced by positivist, materialist and laïcité, if not anti-clerical, ideas.

Popular education may be defined as an educational technique designed to raise the consciousness of its participants and allow them to become more aware of how an individual's personal experiences are connected to larger societal problems. Participants are empowered to act to effect change on the problems that affect them.

=== 19th century ===
One of the roots of popular education was the Condorcet report during the 1789 French Revolution. These ideas became an important component of the Republican and Socialist movement. Following the split of the First International at the 1872 Hague Congress between the "anti-authoritarian socialists" (anarchists) and the Marxists, popular education remained an important part of the workers' movement, in particular in the anarcho-syndicalist movement, strong in France, Spain and Italy. It was one of the important theme treated during the 1907 International Anarchist Congress of Amsterdam.

==== France ====
During the Second Empire, Jean Macé founded the Ligue de l'enseignement (Teaching League) in 1866; during the Lille Congress in 1885, Macé reaffirmed the masonic inspiration of this league devoted to popular instruction. Following the 1872 Hague Congress and the split between Marxists and anarchists, Fernand Pelloutier set up in France various Bourses du travail centres, where workers gathered and discussed politics and science.

The Jules Ferry laws in the 1880s, establishing free, laic (non-religious), mandatory and public education, were one of the founding stones of the Third Republic (1871–1940), set up in the aftermaths of the 1870 Franco-Prussian War and the Paris Commune.

Furthermore, most of the teachers, who were throughout one of the main support of the Third Republic, so much that it has been called the République des instituteurs ("Republic of Teachers"), while the teachers themselves were called, because of their Republican anti-clericalism, the hussards noirs de la République, supported Alfred Dreyfus against the conservatives during the Dreyfus Affair. One of its consequences was for them to set up free educational lectures of humanist topics for adults in order to struggle against the spread of antisemitism, which was not limited to the far-right but also affected the workers' movement.

Paul Robin's work at the Prévost orphanage of Cempuis was the model for Francisco Ferrer's Escuela Moderna in Spain. Robin taught atheism and internationalism, and broke new ground with co-ed schooling, and teaching orphans with the same respect given to other children. He taught that the individual should develop in harmony with the world, on the physical, moral, and intellectual planes.

==== Scandinavia ====
In Denmark, the concept of folk high school was pioneered in 1844 by N. F. S. Grundtvig. By 1870, Denmark had 50 of these institutions. The first in Sweden, Folkhögskolan Hvilan, was established in 1868 outside of Lund.

In 1882, liberal and socialist students at Uppsala University in Sweden founded the association Verdandi for popular education. Between 1888 and 1954 it published 531 educational booklets on various topics (Verdandis småskrifter).

Some Swedish proponents of folkbildning have adopted an anglicization of folkbuilding

A Swedish bibliography on popular education with 25,000 references to books and articles between 1850 and 1950 is integrated in the Libris catalog of the Royal Library.

=== 20th century ===
Popular education continued to be an important field of socialist politics, reemerging in particular during the Popular Front in 1936–38, while autogestion (self-management), a main tenet of the anarcho-syndicalist movement, became a popular slogan following the May '68 revolt.

==== Austria ====
During the Red Vienna period (1919–34) the Viennese Volkshochschule played an important role in providing popular education attracting significant levels of participation from both factory and office workers. They also attracted significant participation from prominent people associated with the Vienna Circle: Otto Neurath, Edgar Zilsel, Friedrich Waismann and Viktor Kraft.

==== Escuela Moderna (1901–1907) ====
The Escuela Moderna (Modern School) was founded in 1901 in Barcelona by free-thinker Francesc Ferrer i Guàrdia, and became a leading inspiration of many various movements. Opposed to the "dogmas of conventional education Ferrer set a system based on reason, science, and observation." The school's stated goal was to "educate the working class in a rational, secular and non-coercive setting". In practice, high tuition fees restricted attendance at the school to wealthier middle class students. It was privately hoped that when the time was ripe for revolutionary action, these students would be motivated to lead the working classes. It closed in 1906. The Escuela Moderna, and Ferrer's ideas generally, formed the inspiration for a series of Modern Schools in the United States, Cuba, South America and London. The first of these was started in New York City in 1911. It also inspired the Italian newspaper Università popolare, founded in 1901.

==== France ====
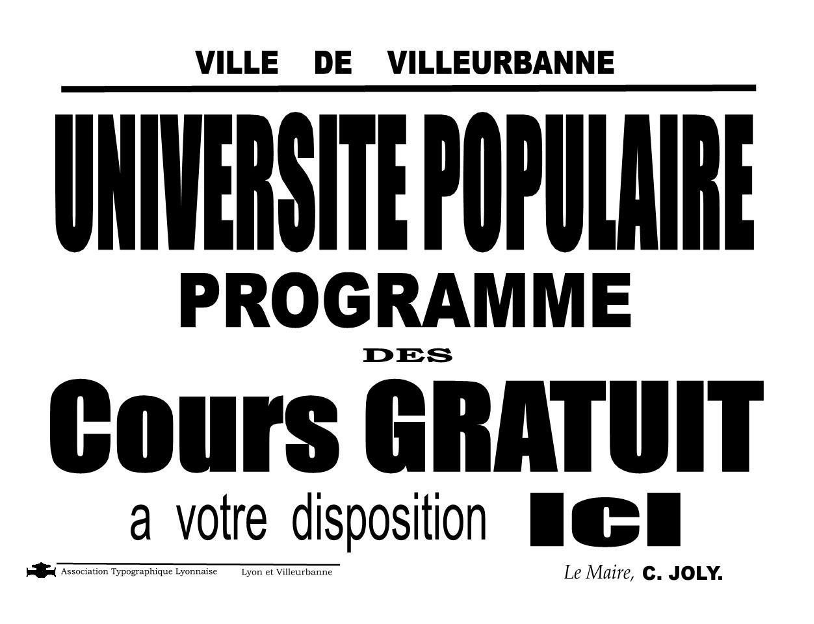
List of lectures, Université populaire – town of Villeurbanne – 1936.

Following the 1981 presidential election that brought to power the Socialist Party (PS)'s candidate, François Mitterrand, his Minister of Education, Alain Savary, supported Jean Lévi's initiative to create a public high school, delivering the baccalauréat, but organized on the principles of autogestion (or self-management): this high school took the name of Lycée autogéré de Paris (LAP). The LAP explicitly modelled itself after the Oslo Experimental High School, opened in 1967 in Norway, as well as the Saint-Nazaire Experimental High School, opened six months before the LAP, and the secondary school Vitruve (opened in 1962 in the 20th arrondissement of Paris, still active). Theoretical references include Célestin Freinet and his comrades from the I.C.E.M., as well as Raymond Fonvieille, Fernand Oury, and others theoreticians of "institutional pedagogy", as well as those coming from the institutional analysis movement, in particular René Lourau, as well as members of the institutional psychotherapeutic movement, which were a main component in the 1970s of the anti-psychiatric movement (of which Félix Guattari was an important member). Since 2005, the LAP has maintained contact with self-managed firms, in the REPAS network (Réseau d'échanges de pratiques alternatives et solidaires, Network of Exchange of Solidarity and Alternative Practices)

A second generation for such folk high school meant to educate the people and the masses spread in the society (mainly for workers) just before the French Front populaire experience, as a reaction among teachers and intellectuals following the February 6, 1934 riots organized by far-right leagues. Issues devoted to free-thinking such as workers' self-management were thought and taught during that time, since the majority of attendants were proletarians interested in politics. Hence, some received the name of Université prolétarienne (Proletarian University) instead of Université populaire (Popular University) in some cities around the country. The reactionary Vichy regime put an end to such projects during World War II. The second generation continued in the post-war period, yet topical lectures turned to be more practical and focused on daily life matters. Nowadays, the largest remnant is located in the Bas-Rhin and Haut-Rhin départements.

Following World War II, popular teaching attempts were initiated mainly by the anarchist movement. Already in 1943, Joffre Dumazedier, Benigno Cacérès, Paul Lengrand, Joseph Rovan and others founded the Peuple et Culture (People and Culture) network, aimed at democratization of culture. Joffre Dumazedier conceptualized, at the Liberation, the concept of "cultural development" to oppose the concept of "economic development", thus foreshadowing the current Human Development Index. Historian Jean Maitron, for example, was director of the Apremont school in Vendée from 1950 to 1955.

Such popular educations were also a major feature of May '68 and of the following decenie, leading in particular to the establishment of the University of Paris VIII: Vincennes—Saint-Denis in Paris, in 1969. The Vincennes University (now located in Saint-Denis) was first an "Experimental University Center," with an interest in reshaping relations between students and teachers (so-called "mandarins", in reference to the bureaucrats of Imperial China, for their authority and classic, Third Republic pedagogy) as well as between the university itself and society. Thus, Vincennes was largely opened to those who did not have their baccalauréat diploma, as well as to foreigners. Its courses were focused on Freudo-Marxism, psychoanalysis, Marxist theory, cinema, theater, urbanism or artificial intelligence. Famous intellectuals such as Gilles Deleuze, Michel Foucault, Jacques Lacan and others held seminars there, in full classrooms where no seats could be found. The assistance was very heterogeneous. For instance, musicians such as Richard Pinhas assisted at Deleuze's courses, and after having written Anti-Oedipus (1972) with Félix Guattari, Deleuze used to say that non-specialists had best understood their work. Furthermore, Vincennes had no amphitheatres, representatives of the mandarin teacher facing and dominating several hundred students silently taking notes. It also enforced a strict equality between professors and teaching assistants. The student revolt continued throughout the 1970s in both Vincennes and the University of Paris X: Nanterre, created in 1964. In 1980, the Minister of Education Alice Saunier-Seité imposed the transfer of Vincennes' University to Saint-Denis. Although education was normalized in the 1980s, during the Mitterrand era, in both Saint-Denis and Vincennes, these universities have retained a less traditional outlook than the classic Sorbonne, where courses tend to be more conservative and sociological composition more middle-upper class.

Another attempt in popular education, specifically targeted towards the question of philosophy (France being one of the rare country where this discipline is taught in terminale, the last year of high school which culminate in the baccalauréat degree) was the creation, in 1983, of the open university named Collège international de philosophie (International Philosophy College, or Ciph), by Jacques Derrida, François Châtelet, Jean-Pierre Faye and Dominique Lecourt, in an attempt to re-think the teaching of philosophy in France, and to liberate it from any institutional authority (most of all from the university). As the ancient Collège de France, created by Francis I, it is free and open to everyone. The Ciph was first directed by Derrida, then by Philippe Lacoue-Labarthe, and has had as teaching members Giorgio Agamben, Alain Badiou, Sidi Mohamed Barkat, Geoffrey Bennington, François Châtelet, José Gil, Olivier LeCour Grandmaison, Antonio Negri, and others. The Ciph is still active.

In 2002 philosopher Michel Onfray initiated Université populaire de Caen in his hometown and starting a long seminar dealing with hedonistic philosophy from ancient times to May'68 events in French society, for at least ten years. His very topical subject in this seminar keeps going with a free-thinking spirit, since people are invited on the whole to rethink the history of ideas to eliminate any Christian influence. Despite the same name of Université populaire, it is not linked to the European federation of associations inherited from the second generation. In 2004, Onfray expanded the experience to other cities such as Arras, Lyon, Narbonne, Avignon, and Mons (in Belgium); each with various lectures and teachers joining his idea. The Universités populaires in Argentan is meant to deliver a culture of culinary tastes to nonworking people, through lectures and practises of famous chefs.

== Latin America ==
Popular education is most commonly understood as an approach to education that emerged in Latin America during the 1930s. Closely linked with Marxism and particularly liberation theology. Best known amongst popular educators is the Brazilian Paulo Freire. Freire, and consequently the popular education movement in Latin America, draws heavily upon the work of John Dewey and Antonio Gramsci. One of the features of popular education in Latin America has been participatory action research (PAR).

=== 1940s–1960s ===
Popular education has gone through different stages. It originated in Latin America in the 1950s, specifically in Brazil, a country with serious social inequalities. In the 1960s, the goal was to form organizations that would change reality. Popularized with Paulo Freire's Pedagogy of the Oppressed published in 1968.

=== 1970s–1980s ===
In the 1970s, the popular movements that had begun in previous years were strengthened. During the following decade, efforts were made to professionalize the existing educational groups. Since the Mexican Revolution, the need for popular educational reforms in the country has been proposed. Processes have been underway since the Zapatista Army of National Liberation (EZLN) through the Zapatista Autonomous Rebel Secondary Schools. Literacy programs such as Adeco (Actions for Community Development A.C.) have been active since 1982. In Ecuador, the Institute for Research, Education, and Popular Promotion of Ecuador (INEPE) is a community organization that has been continuously working in Popular Education processes with children, youth, and adults from low-income communities in the city of Quito since 1985. It is an initiative that adapts Paulo Freire's principles to early childhood, primary, secondary, and university education, in addition to carrying out community work with the residents of La Dolorosa de Chilibulo.

=== 1990s–present ===
Since the early 1990s in Brazil popular education became a very influential in the Landless Workers' Movement (MST) by running the Popular University of Social Movements (PUSM). In Argentina, the Universidad Trashumante was thought of as a popular education institution in 1990s. The project was though of by Sendas para la Educacion Popular, a group directly influenced by Paulo Freire with the philosophy of having the university go to the streets to listen to the people. The Popular University of the Mothers of Plaza de Mayo as well integrated popular education principles. As well, the Cooperative of Popular Educators and Researchers Argentina founded schools in 2004 with the belief that views education as a tool for social transformation from below. In Chile, the national movement of popular educators, the Santiago Network of Popular Educators, the Caracol Collective, along with free schools and popular pre-university programs, participated in the 2019 protests in Chile. Among the collectives with a significant history of developing popular education proposals in Chile, the Paulo Freire Collective has, since 2007, carried out important work as educators, not only in community-based work but also in systematization and training processes. With notable thinkers like Luis Bustos Titus emerging from the collective.

== Africa ==
=== Anglophone colonies ===
Anne Hope and Sally Timmel were Christian development workers and educators who used popular education in their work in East Africa. They documented their work between 1973 and 1984 in four handbooks designed to aid practitioners titled Training for Transformation.

== North America ==
In the United States and Canada popular education influenced social justice education and critical pedagogy, though there are differences. At the same time, however, there are examples of popular education in the U.S. and Canada that grew up alongside and independently of popular education in Latin America.

== See also ==
- Adult literacy
- Community education
- Experiential education
- Place-based education
- Rouge Forum
- Special education and inclusive classrooms
