= François Tosquelles =

Catalan psychiatrist (1912-1994)

Francesc Tosquelles
- Born: Francesc Tosquelles Llauradó; 22 August 1912; Reus, Catalonia, Spain
- Died: 25 September 1994 (aged 82); Granjas d'Òut, Aquitaine, France
- Occupation: Psychiatrist
- Employer: Institut Pere Mata
- Political party: Workers and Peasants' Bloc (until 1935); Workers' Party of Marxist Unification (from 1935)
- Awards: Medalla al treball President Macià (1994)

Francesc Tosquelles Llauradó (22 August 1912 – 25 September 1994), also known as François Tosquelles (French: [tɔskɛʃ]) during his time in France, was a French psychiatrist of Catalan origin.

== Life ==
Francesc Tosquelles Llauradó was born into a progressive middle class family in Reus, in 1912. He studied medicine in Barcelona, where in 1924, during the dictatorship of Primo de Rivera, he and a handful of students stormed the premises of the right-wing Patriotic Union on La Rambla. Tosquelles's uncle, the physician and philanthropist Francesc Llauradó, had translated and studied Sigmund Freud's The Interpretation of Dreams, inspiring him to take up psychiatry. Tosquelles trained with psychiatrist Emili Mira, went to work at the Institut Pere Mata, and contributed to the medical publication Fulls clínics. He was a Catalan nationalist and was affiliated with the Workers and Peasants' Bloc (BOC) and its successor, the Workers' Party of Marxist Unification (POUM).

After the Spanish coup of July 1936, Tosquelles went to the Aragon front, where he assisted combatants suffering from post-traumatic stress disorder (PTSD). In the first months of the war, he and other POUM militants collectivised two farmhouses on the road from Reus to Salou, where they developed the "bases of child and youth psychotherapy" and established premises for teaching in the schools of Reus.

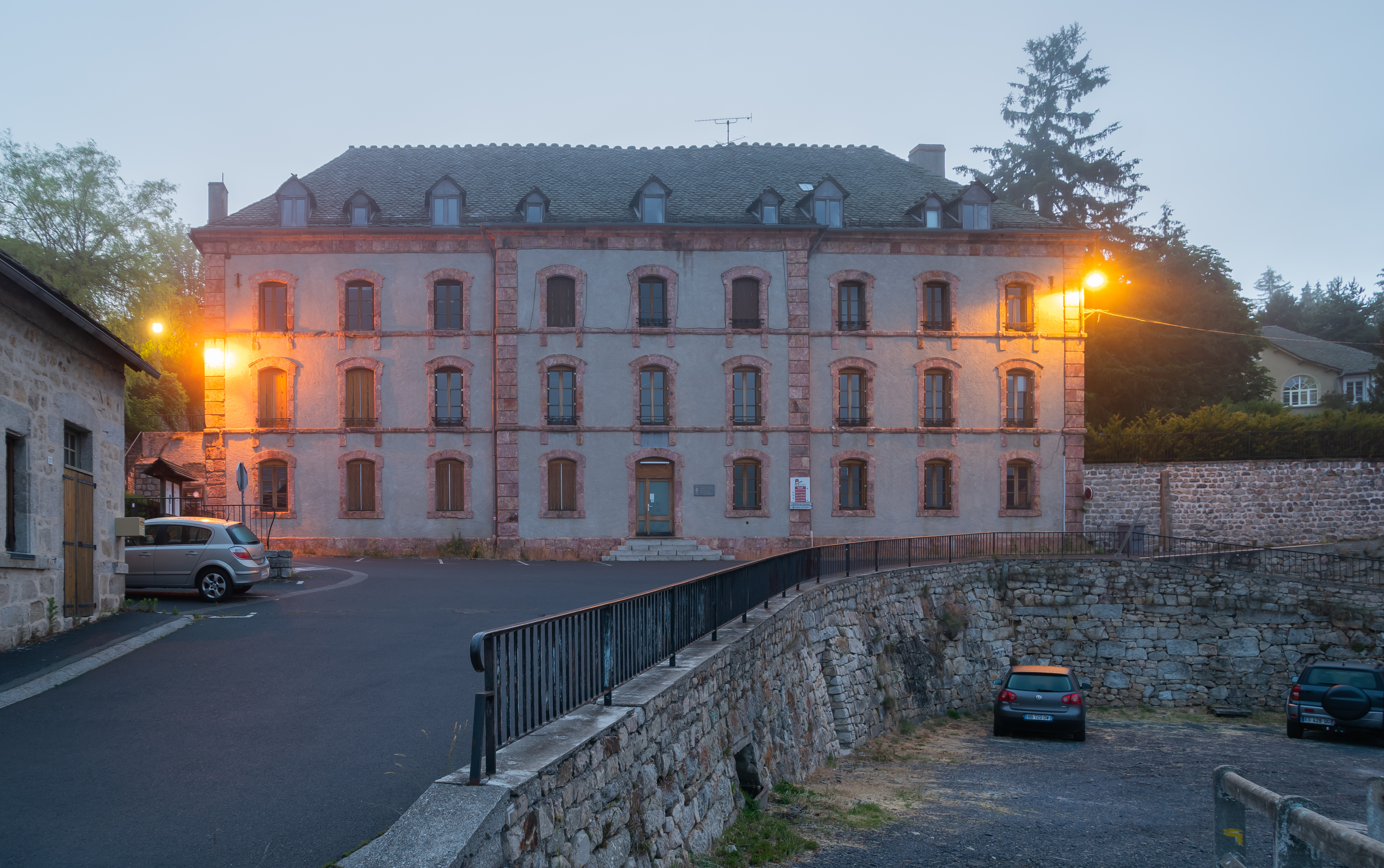
The psychiatric hospital at Saint-Alban is now named François Tosquelles after him.

With the Nationalist victory in the Spanish Civil War in early 1939, he crossed the France–Spain border and spent three months in the Sètfonts internment camp, where he created a psychiatric unit.

In 1940, he was hired at the psychiatric hospital of Saint-Alban (Lozère), an impoverished area in the Southeast of France. Saint-Alban's director was the progressive catholic psychiatrist Paul Balvet. The hospital became a refuge for dissidents, artists and thinkers during the Nazi occupation of France. Under Tosquelles's impulse, the hospital became a haven for socialist- and psychoanalytically-inspired treatment methods, and also contributed to the birth of outsider art or "art brut" (raw art), as the hospital's patients created sculptures and objects from the materials they had at hand. Some of these pieces are now part of museum collections.

In 1952, the newly-minted doctor and Communist activist Frantz Fanon became a resident doctor at Saint-Alban. Tosquelles shared with Fanon a desire to defend minority languages and cultures. His initial impression of Fanon was a negative one, largely because Fanon had studied at the University of Lyon, whose approach to psychiatry Tosquelles opposed. However, he eventually came to recognize and admire Fanon's anti-establishment attitude. Together, Tosquelles and Fanon wrote a series of research papers that delivered a positive assessment of Lucio Bini's method of electroconvulsive therapy.

Together with Lucien Bonnafé, Tosquelles founded the school of institutional psychotherapy, a movement which later gave rise to anti-psychiatry. He also chaired seminars on the history of psychoanalysis in the Catalan countries in Perpinyà. In the late 1960s he was appointed the director of the Institut Pere Mata. He led the institute until his death in Granjas d'Òut in 1994.

== Selected works ==
- De la personne au groupe: A propos des équipes de soin, 1995. Eres. ISBN 9782749219035, 2749219035.
- Éducation et psychothérapie institutionnelle, 1984. Matrice Éditions. ISBN 9782905642875, 2905642874.
- Hygiène mentale des éducateurs et leur efficacité, 1962. Éditions Hermann. ASIN B0BPCV5XN7.

== See also ==
- François-Tosquelles Hospital Center (fr)
