= Jean Oury =

French psychiatrist and psychoanalyst

Jean Oury (French: [uʁi]; 5 March 1924, La Garenne-Colombes – 15 May 2014, Cour-Cheverny) was a French psychiatrist and psychoanalyst who helped found the school of institutional psychotherapy.

== Work ==
He was the founder and director of the La Borde Clinic, a psychiatric clinic in Cour-Cheverny, where he worked until his death. He was a member of the École Freudienne de Paris, founded by Jacques Lacan, from inception until its dissolution. His brother, Fernand Oury, founded the school of institutional pedagogy.

== See also ==
- Félix Guattari

== Sources ==
- Camille Robcis (2021), Disalienation: Politics, Philosophy, and Radical Psychiatry in Postwar France, University of Chicago Press.
