= Association for Community Colleges =

The Association for Community Colleges (ACC) was a Europe-based organization. Its principal aim was to foster the folk high school model across Europe.

== Activities ==
The ACC engaged in a variety of European educational and community development initiatives. One project undertaken by the ACC was 'Youth 2002', a gathering of young Europeans to work on a constitutional drafting process. The ACC coordinated courses and produced educational materials, among them the Journal of World Education and the ACCENT magazine. The organization has since ceased operations.

The ACC was active in Tuscany, Cornwall, Latvia,The Netherlands, Transylvania, Denmark, Rhodes, Palencia, Slovenia, Niedersachsen, Friuli-Venezia Giulia and Hungary.

The ACC was founded on 11 August 1999 and closed in 2021.

== Further sources ==
- Petersen, John: "Europæiske højskoler er fremtiden", Politiken (1999-10-17), Debat, page 10
- Petersen, John: "Nichtexklusive europäische Identität für alle", Nordschleswiger (2000-08-08)
- Ilyes, Agota: "Népföiskolák nemzetközi értekezlete Dániabán", Szabadszág (2000-08-08), page 1
- Højlund, Niels: "Europæisk højskole er fremtiden!", Højskolebladet no. 25 (2000-09-08)
- Bágyi Bencze, Jakab: "Erdélyi Népföiskola 2001 konferencia", Hargita Népe (2001-07-03)
- Zidaric, Vinko: "Škola europskog zajedniŠtva", Školske novine broj 38 (2002-11-26), page 12
- Petersen, John: "Om et fremtidigt europæisk civilsamfund", Den frie Lærerskole, no. 3, year 49 (December 2002), page 15
- Duraku, Ali: "Shqiptarja që hartoi Kushtetutë të Bashkimit Evropian", Fakti (2002-12-30)
- Mezgec, Maja: "Pogled Mladih na prihodnost Europe", Nedeljske Teme (2003-01-12)
- Valvo, Eva: "Il dialogo interculturale", NotiziarioFGEI (2003-02-01), page 3
- Valvo, Eva: "I giovani e'lavvenire dell'Europa", Riforma (2003-02-07), page 7
- Hoefmans, Alexander: "Davos a world of contrasts", Diplomatic World, No.1 (2003), page 36
- Tal-e-Bot, Rhisiart: "Ullmhú an Choirn le haghaidh Ré an Eolais", Carn, No. 123 (2003)
- Nikolova, Natalia: "ΗΕΦΟΡΜΑЛНИ МЛΑДЕЖИ ΟБРΑЗΟВΑТЕЛНИ МΟДЕЛИ - Ролята на неформалното образование в обединена Европа", Образование No.4 (2004), year XIII, page 84-86
- NN: "Véletlenül éppen Dániában", Népszabadság Online (2004-11-11)
- Malik, Szilvia: "Asociácia spolocenstva vysokých skôl - azyl pre názory na dianie v Európe", Mosty (2005-09-27), page 4 (Czechoslovak Mosty by Soňa Čechová)
- Minnema, Elske: "Europeanen zingen altijd hetzelfde liedje", Leeuwarder Courant (2005-09-29), page 16
- Branny, Dariusz: "Młodzi w Europie. ACC, czyli integracja powiązana z dyplomacją", Głos - Gazeta Polaków w Republice Czeskiej (2006-04-11)
- Buhrmann, Peter: "Vi har brug for en europæisk højskolelov", Kristeligt Dagblad (2013-03-21), Debat, page 13
- da Cruz, Alina Pecorari: "A participação da sociedade civil européia, através das Organizações Não Governamentais (ONGs), nos rumos dos projetos educacionais da União Européia" in Cadernos jurídicos : curso de direito UNISAL, pages 164-178
- Campaigning for Community Colleges: Annual 2000 of the ACC (ISBN 8791372003); Schools for Europe: Annual 2001 of the ACC (ISBN 8791372011); Youth 2002.Annual 2002 of the ACC (ISBN 8791372038). Bridging Community Colleges: Annual 2003 of the ACC (ISBN 8791372046); Learning and living together: Annual 2004 of the ACC (ISBN 8791372054); Europe, Let's focus: Annual 2005 of the ACC (ISBN 8791372070); Periods of Reflection. Annual 2006-7 of the ACC (ISBN 8791372089).
