= Freinet classification =

Organisation system for libraries

The Freinet classification ("To organise everything") is used in the libraries of some elementary schools, and was invented by Célestin Freinet to facilitate the easy finding of documents, and the use of the "Bibliothèque de Travail".

The principles are simple: Everything is split into 12 major divisions. 12 subdivisions along the principles of the Dewey Decimal system are then divided into 10, and then 10 again.

Because of its logical classifications based on school work, this classification is seen by some educators to be more natural and more logical to students than official classifications based on organizational criteria. The last revision took place in 1984. It is still used, in addition to keywords, in IT and some data information organization systems.

== The 12 divisions ==
=== 0. Reference ===
- 00 General
- 01 English Dictionaries
- 02 Dictionaries in foreign languages
- 03 Bilingual, trilingual, ... dictionaries
- 04 Other Dictionaries (proper names, places, ...)
- 05 Encyclopedias
- 06 Repertory, bibliographies
- 07 Reference works (textbooks)

=== 1. Natural Environment ===
- 11 Land (geology)
- 12 Relief
- 13 Freshwater
- 14 The oceans and seas
- 15 The climates and vegetation
- 16 Heaven (astronomy)
- 17 Nature and Life (ecology)

=== 2. Plants ===
- 21 Study of the plant
- 22 The flowering plants
- 23 The plants without flowers or seeds
- 24 The microscopic beings

=== 3. Animals ===
- 30 General study of the body (in humans and animals)
- 31 The health of humans
- 32 Mammals (except humans)
- 33 Birds
- 34 Reptiles and amphibians
- 35 Fish
- 36 Insects (articulated)
- 37 Other articulated
- 38 Shellfish
- 39 Other animals

=== 4. Other sciences ===
- 41 Mathematics
- 42 Physical Sciences
- 43 Chemistry
- 44 Technology

=== 5. Food and Agriculture ===
- 51 Working the earth
- 52 Cultures
- 53 Livestock
- 54 Forestry
- 55 Fishing
- 56 Hunting
- 57 Food industry
- 58 Foods
- 59 Drinks

=== 6. Labor and Industry ===
- 60 General
- 61 Sources of energy and engines
- 62 Mining and quarrying
- 63 Metals
- 64 Chemical Industry
- 65 Textile and clothing industry
- 66 Building industry, housing and furniture
- 67 Other Industries

=== 7. The city and stock exchanges ===
- 71 The city, the municipality
- 72 Trade
- 73 Road Transport
- 74 Rail transport
- 75 Inland waterway transport
- 76 Maritime Transport
- 77 Air transportation and space
- 78 Post, Telecommunications and IT
- 79 Travel and Tourism

=== 8. Society ===
- 81 People
- 82 Contracts (environmental and social issues)
- 83 Administrative organization of society
- 84 Organisation of social policy
- 85 Reports from nations

=== 9. Culture and Recreation ===
- 91 Education and instructions
- 92 Languages
- 93 Literature and Philosophy
- 94 Religions
- 95 Arts & Entertainment
- 96 Sports and Games

=== G. Geography ===
- G0 The study of geography
- G1 General Geography
- G2 Geography locally and regionally
- G3 Our country
- G4 Europe
- G5 Asia
- G6 Africa
- G7 America
- G8 Oceania
- G9 The Polar World

=== H. History ===
- H1 Prehistory
- H2 The East, Greece
- H3 Rome and the early Middle Ages (from −700 to 987)
- H4 Middle Ages (from 987 to 1492)
- H5 Absolute monarchy (1492 to 1789)
- H6 Struggles for Democracy (1789 to 1848)
- H7 Organization of the Republic (1848 to 1914)
- H8 Contemporary history (1914–present)
