= Fernand Oury =

French educational theorist

Fernand Oury (French: [uʁi]; 18 January 1920, La Garenne-Colombes – 19 February 1998, Blois) was a French pedagogue and creator of institutional pedagogy. He recommended and practiced a "school of the people" methodology, in which children were no longer passive receivers, but actively participated in the management of their learning, methods, forms of relations and the everyday life of the class: all of which he called institutions (in the sociological sense). Some of the notable elements of this methodology were pupils' council, school funds and individualized curricula.

== Work ==
As a teacher in 1950, Oury reacted to what he saw as the deplorable state of the French educational system: "overloaded classes", "colossal school sizes", and "absurd regulations". Along with fellow educator Célestin Freinet, he worked with school leadership to reform organizational practice within urban schools. By 1958, following on the initiatives of institutional psychotherapy led by his brother Jean Oury, François Tosquelles, and Lucien Bonnafe, Fernand Oury founded the discipline of institutional pedagogy, the object of which would be the progressive analysis of liberating means of education. Perhaps the most well-known name in the field of institutional pedagogy, Oury maintained an open relationship with respect to defining the scope and practice of teaching.

By 1966, Oury and psychoanalyst Aïda Vasquez, along with the Groupe Techniques Éducatives (GET) begin to work out the practical and theoretical instruments institutional pedagogy would develop as a practice. This was accomplished primarily through the elaboration of monographs. The practice of publishing articles of analysis, case-studies and critiques also began to be encouraged.

In 1978, Oury and others established CEPI, the Collective of Teams of Institutional Pedagogy (French Le Collectif des Équipes de Pédagogie Institutionnelle), and the MPI, Association for the Support of Institutional Pedogagy (Association Maintenant la Pédagogie Institutionnelle), both still in existence. Their primary tasks are the publication and dissemination of institutional pedagogic literature, reports, analyses and case-studies, the promotion and activism in favour of progressive pedagogic practices, and the education of teachers, social workers and others in Institutional Pedagogic practices.

=== Pillars of institutional pedagogy ===
Oury's framework of analysis initially consisted of three pillars of consideration (1964):

1. Materialist: the equipment, the techniques of organisation and initiating activities, consideration of concrete situations, and concrete relations.
2. Sociological: consideration of the class, groups and grouping of groups and classes and effects; intercommunications and phenomena within groups that overdetermine behaviour and evolutions of the students.
3. Psychoanalytic: to quote Oury "acknowledged or disclaimed, the unconscious is in the class and it speak... It is better to understand that to be subjected it."

== Publications ==
- Chronique de l'école-caserne, with Jacques Pain, Maspero, 1972.
- De la classe coopérative... à la Pédagogie Institutionnelle, with Aïda Vasquez, first edition Maspero, 1971.
- Vers une Pédagogie Institutionnelle ?, with Aïda Vasquez, Éd. Matrice, 1991.
- Qui c'est l'conseil ?, with Catherine Pochet, Maspero, 1979.
- «L'année dernière, j'étais mort...» signé Miloud, with Jean Oury & Catherine Pochet, Matrice, 1992.

== See also ==
- Félix Guattari
