= Freinet Modern School Movement =

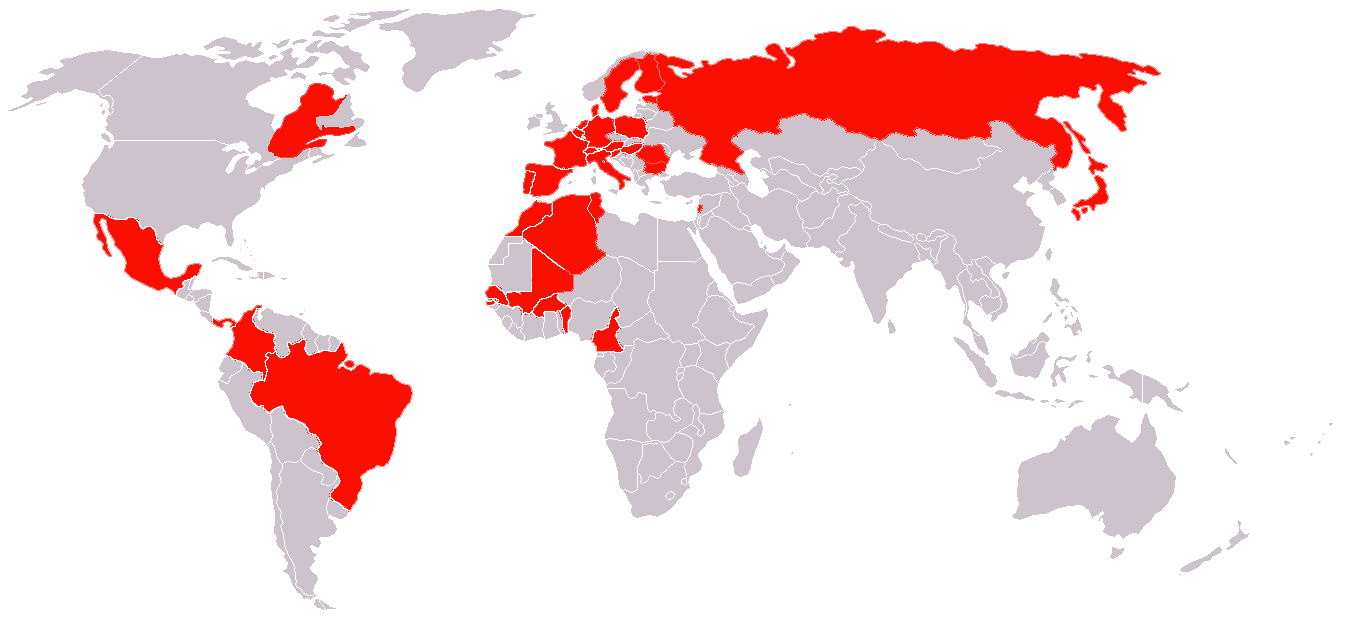
Countries with Modern School Movements in 2005. Some countries noted on the map are not members of FIMEM.

The Modern School Movement (French: Mouvement de l'École Moderne) is the community of teachers who follow the educational and social practices of Célestin Freinet, his wife Élise and their successors.

== In francophone countries ==
In France, the Modern School Movement is represented by the Cooperative Institute of the Modern School (ICEM), which was founded in 1947 by Freinet and his regional groups. Freinet led the movement until his death in 1966. After his death, ICEM has moved away from the ideas of Freinet, with multiple influences.

In Belgium (Wallonia), there is a branch under the name Éducation populaire since 1937. In Switzerland, in 1998 the Swiss Group of the Modern School united three smaller groups: the Romand Group of the Modern School (est. 1952), the Genevan Group of the Modern School (est. 1968), and the Swiss German Freinet Pedagogy Working Group (German: Arbeitsgruppe Pädagogik Deutschschweiz-Freinet, est. 1977).

== In the world ==
The International Federation of Modern School Movements (FIMEM), founded in 1957, united the national movements and has organized an international congress (RIDEF) every two years. There teachers meet to share and develop their ideas and practice.

== Publications of the Movement ==
The Secular Education Cooperative (CEL) was founded in 1928 to produce teaching materials for those who practiced Freinet's pedagogy, and magazines and brochures for the Movement. It was taken over by teachers of the movement in 1986, after financial problems, and became the limited liability company French Modern School Publications (PEMF). This publishing house later moved away from publishing exclusively manuscripts for Freinet teachers, embracing the full range of education journals such as The New Educator or Library of work.
