= Institutional psychotherapy =

French psychiatric reform movement

Institutional psychotherapy (also known as institutional analysis) is a philosophical movement for psychiatry reform and an approach to group psychotherapy influenced by Marxism and Lacanian psychoanalysis that emerged in France during World War II. The Association of Institutional Psychotherapy was founded in November 1965. Those associated with the approach include François Tosquelles, Jean Oury, Félix Guattari, Frantz Fanon, and Georges Canguilhem. Institutional psychotherapy proposed a radical restructuring of the insane asylum and the mental health clinic whereby patients would actively participate in running the facility. The approach began in a hospital in Saint-Alban-sur-Limagnole with Tosquelles, Fanon, and Oury, and then continued at the La Borde Clinic, which was founded by Oury and where Guattari worked until his death. Institutional psychotherapy is also practiced by Patrick Chemla at the Centre Artaud in Reims and has spread to Spain and Italy.

Although similar to anti-psychiatry in its institutional critique, the founders of institutional psychotherapy were adamant about distinguishing their approach from it, claiming that anti-psychiatry failed to account for the reality of mental illness, arguing that psychosis is not merely a social construct, and were open to neuroleptics and even, at times, to electroconvulsive therapy. Guattari wrote of a "systematic failure" of many psychiatrists to understand "what was going on outside the hospital walls", leading to a tendency to psychologize social problems. According to Guattari, the goal was to "never to isolate the study of mental illness from its social and institutional context, and... to analyze institutions on the basis of interpreting the real, symbolic and imaginary effects of society upon individuals."

Institutional psychotherapy and the terminology used by the psychoanalysts associated with it took on a noticeable evolution throughout the 1960s to 1980s. After Guattari began to distance himself from the concept of schizoanalysis (only one year after the 1972 publication of Anti-Oedipus), he proposed that "institutional analysis" be used instead of "institutional psychotherapy". This change in nomenclature represented Guattari's intention to direct the practice at the La Borde Clinic toward a more political direction, calling for "a political analysis of desire." Guattari offered an extensive critique of institutional psychotherapy in the beginning of Molecular Revolution (1984) and introduced the concept of "institutional analysis". Guattari referred to the interactive transference that occurred at the La Borde Clinic as "transversality", while Oury called it "transferential constellation".

== See also ==
- Schizoanalysis
- Anti-psychiatry
- La Borde clinic
- Institutional pedagogy
