= Granges-sur-Lot =

- Commune
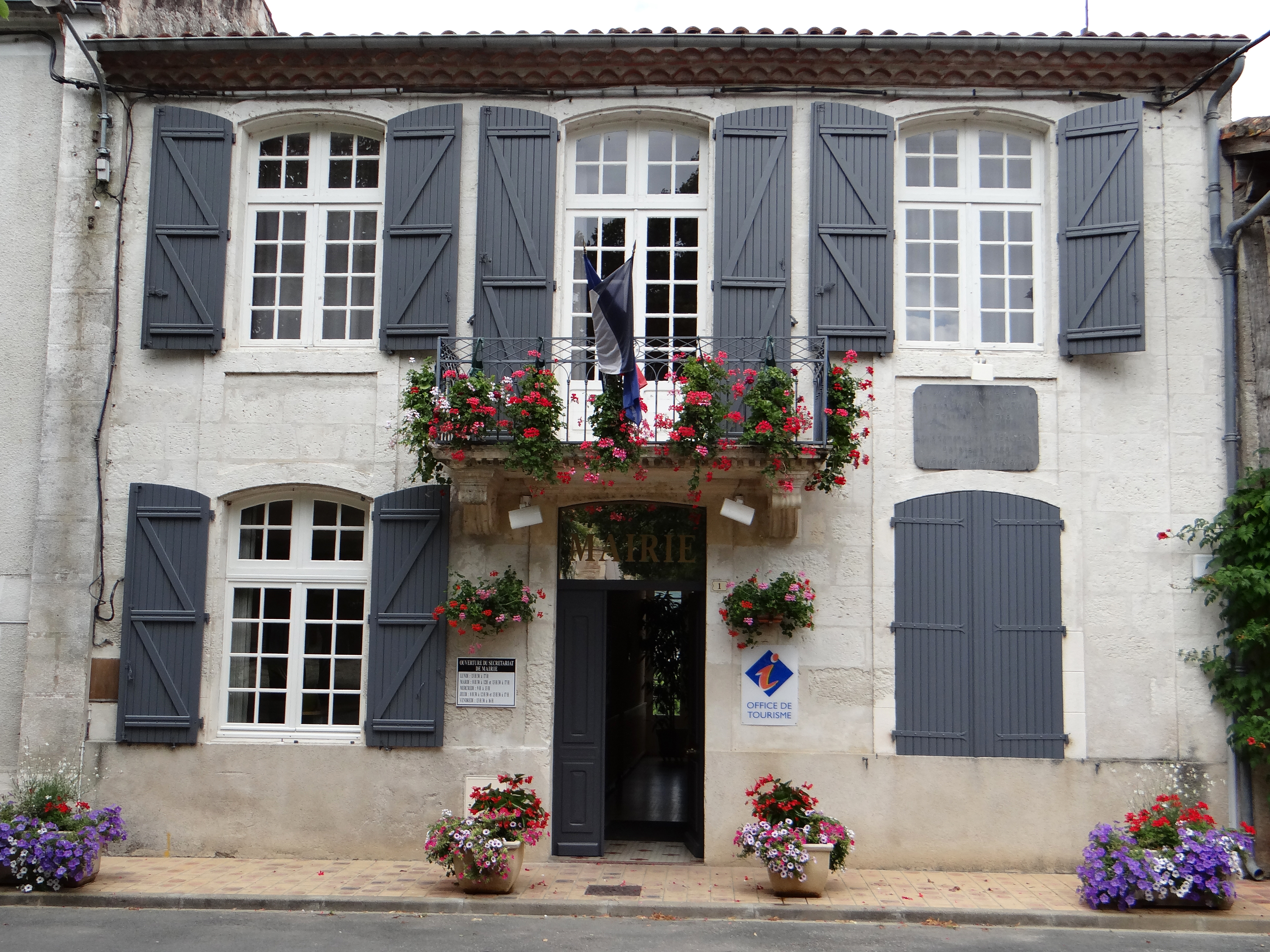
- The town hall in Granges-sur-Lot

- Coat of arms
- Location of Granges-sur-Lot
- Location within France Location within Nouvelle-Aquitaine
- Coordinates: 44°22′38″N 0°27′58″E
- Country: France
- Region: Nouvelle-Aquitaine
- Department: Lot-et-Garonne
- Arrondissement: Agen
- Canton: Le Confluent
- Intercommunality: Confluent et Coteaux de Prayssas

Government
  - Mayor (2020–2026): Jean-Marie Boé
- Area^{1}: 4.19 km^{2} (1.62 sq mi)
- Elevation: 41 m (135 ft)
- Highest elevation: 64 m (210 ft)
- Lowest elevation: 32 m (105 ft)
- Population (2023): 590
  - Density: 140/km^{2} (360/sq mi)
- Time zone: UTC+01:00 (CET)
  - Summer (DST): UTC+02:00 (CEST)
- INSEE/Postal code: 47111 /47260
- ^{1} French Land Register data, which excludes lakes, ponds, glaciers > 1 km^{2} (0.386 sq mi or 247 acres) and river estuaries.

Granges-sur-Lot (French pronunciation: [ɡʁɑ̃ʒ syʁ lɔt], literally Granges on Lot; Occitan: Granjas d'Òut) is a commune in the Lot-et-Garonne department in south-western France.

== See also ==
- Communes of the Lot-et-Garonne department
