= Institutional analysis =

Part of the social sciences which studies how institutions behave and function

Institutional analysis is the part of the social sciences that studies how institutions—i.e., structures and mechanisms of social order and cooperation governing the behavior of two or more individuals—behave and function according to both empirical rules (informal rules-in-use and norms) and also theoretical rules (formal rules and law). This field deals with how individuals and groups construct institutions, how institutions function in practice, and the effects of institutions on each other, on individuals, societies and the community at large.

== Use in various disciplines ==
The term institutional analysis is used by several academic disciplines, and has several meanings and connotations.

One meaning of institutional analysis refers to actual formal institutions. In the biomedical sciences, “institutional analysis” often refers to analyzing data coming from concrete institutions such as health authorities, hospital networks, etc. Similarly, in the fields of education and public administration and governance studies, the term usually refers to how school boards and governmental agencies implement policies.

Another meaning refers to institutions as ways of thinking that have a direct impact on behaviors. Under this approach, there are several variations and usages of institutional analysis. In economics, it is used to explain why economic behavior does not conform to the theory of supply and demand. This is a relatively old school of thought that has its roots in the work of early 20th-century economists like Pareto. One of the most prominent contemporary figures of institutional analysis in economics is Douglass North, who received the Nobel Prize for Economics in 1993.

Sociology has also used institutional analysis since its inception to study how social institutions such as the laws or the family evolve over time. The foundational author of this approach is Émile Durkheim, also founder of sociology as a discipline.

Since the 1980s, however, there are cross-pollinations between the sociological and economic traditions in institutional analysis. A new focus is to explain how organizations and individuals within organizations make economic and managerial decisions, particularly by investigating the non-rational, non-economic, and non-psychological factors. This movement produced what is known as the new institutional analysis. The neoinstitutional approach has several variants. One of them tries to improve economic models based on the theory of public choice, and one of its applications is known as the institutional analysis and development (IAD) framework developed by Elinor Ostrom, for which she received the Nobel Prize for Economics in 2009. Another variant is influenced by organizational sociology and seeks to integrate Max Weber’s work on bureaucratic mentality.

There is also a French school of institutional analysis influenced by the Durkheimian analysis of social institutions, and the anthropological school of thought established by Marcel Mauss. This approach to institutional analysis is also influenced by thinkers such as Cornelius Castoriadis and Michel Foucault. The main thrust of this approach is the identification of hidden forms of power that institute behaviors and organizational procedures. Felix Guattari also proposed the use of the term in works such as The Molecular Revolution (1984), as institutional psychotherapy had evolved since its inception in the 1950s.

== See also ==
- Institutional theory
- Outline of management
