= Saint-Alban-sur-Limagnole =

- Commune
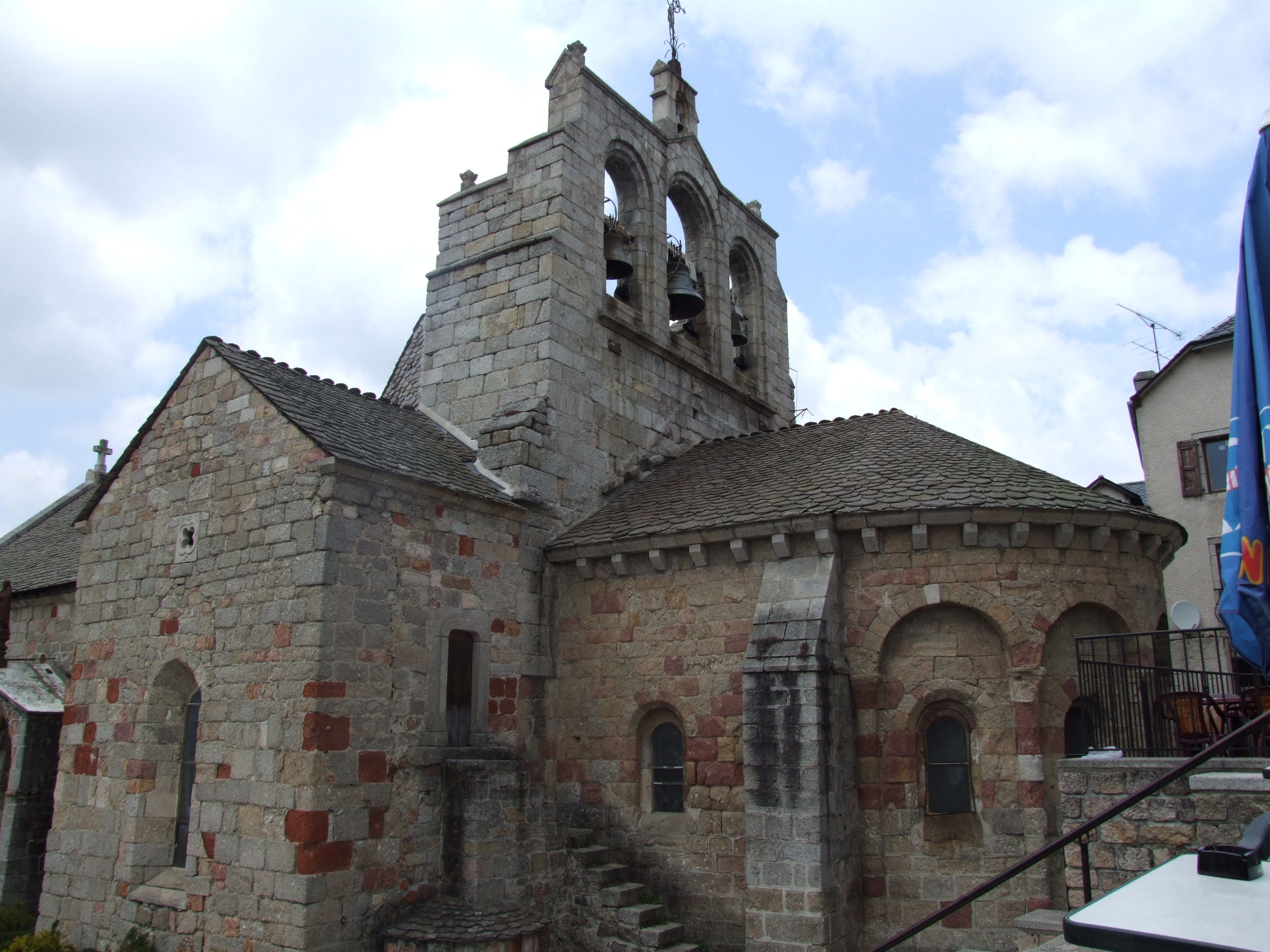
- The church of Saint-Alban-sur-Limagnole

- Coat of arms
- Location of Saint-Alban-sur-Limagnole
- Location within France Location within Occitanie
- Coordinates: 44°46′55″N 3°23′21″E
- Country: France
- Region: Occitania
- Department: Lozère
- Arrondissement: Mende
- Canton: Saint-Alban-sur-Limagnole
- Intercommunality: Terres d'Apcher-Margeride-Aubrac

Government
  - Mayor (2020–2026): Samuel Soulier
- Area^{1}: 51.23 km^{2} (19.78 sq mi)
- Elevation: 950 m (3,120 ft)
- Highest elevation: 1,305 m (4,281 ft)
- Lowest elevation: 872 m (2,861 ft)
- Population (2023): 1,385
  - Density: 27.03/km^{2} (70.02/sq mi)
- Time zone: UTC+01:00 (CET)
  - Summer (DST): UTC+02:00 (CEST)
- INSEE/Postal code: 48132 /48120
- ^{1} French Land Register data, which excludes lakes, ponds, glaciers > 1 km^{2} (0.386 sq mi or 247 acres) and river estuaries.

Saint-Alban-sur-Limagnole (French pronunciation: [sɛ̃.t‿albɑ̃ syʁ limaɲɔl]; Occitan: Sent Auban) is a commune in the Lozère department in southern France. It is situated in the northern parts of the Lozère department.

== See also ==
- Communes of the Lozère department
