= Institutional pedagogy =

Institutional pedagogy is a practice of education that is centered on two factors: 1. the complexity of the learner, and the "unconscious" that the educator brings to the classroom. This unconscious is another name for the diversity of social, economic, cultural and other unspoken elements that an educator interacts with in an institutional setting; and 2. the role of the institution in the process of intervening in both those psycho-social factors and in what is known by a student.

But even more than this, as conceived by its founder, Fernand Oury, Institutional Pedagogy is a constant calling into question of the institutional context itself. Thus the classroom is never a presupposed and static setting. The movement of Institutional Pedagody is thus in direct opposition to the prevailing trends of education prior to the late 1960s, almost all of which tended to homogenize socio-cultural differences amongst learners, psycho-social factors in learning and most important the presence of the "unconscious" in the classroom itself.

Thus the use of 'institution' in Institutional Pedagogy is broader than in its more colloquial sense. To Oury the institution could be defined as: "the places, moments, status of each according to his/her level of performance, that is to say according to his/her potentialities, the functions (services, posts, responsibilities), roles (president, secretary), diverse meetings (team captains, different levels of classes, etc.), and the rituals that maintain their efficacy."

== See also ==
- Popular education
- Institutional psychotherapy

== Bibliography ==
- Oury, Fernand and Aïda Vasquez. Vers une pédagogie institutionnelle, Maspero, 1968.
- Félix Guattari, L'intervention institutionnelle, Payot, 1980.
- René Laffitte, Groupe TFPI, Mémento de Pédagogie Institutionnelle – Faire de la classe un milieu éducatif, Matrice, 1999.
- Jacques Pain, Pédagogie institutionnelle et formation, Micropolis, 1982.
- Jacques Pain, La pédagogie institutionnelle d'intervention, Matrice, 1993.
- Françoise Thébaudin, Fernand Oury, Pedagogie Institutionnelle – Mise en place et pratique des institutions dans la classe, Matrice, 1996.
