= Raymond Fonvieille =

French speed skater (born 1942)

Personal information
- Nationality: French
- Born: 16 October 1942 (age 82); Paris, France

Sport
- Sport: Speed skating

Raymond Fonvieille (born 16 October 1942) is a French speed skater. He competed in two events at the 1964 Winter Olympics.
