= René Lourau =

French sociologist and educator (1933–2000)

René Lourau (French: [luʁo]; 26 August 1933, Gelos – 11 January 2000, Versailles, Yvelines) was a French sociologist and educator.

== Works ==
- L'instituant contre l'institue [Instituting against the instituted], Paris: Anthropos, 1969
- L'analyse institutionnelle [Institutional analysis], Paris: Éditions de Minuit, 1970
- (with Georges Lapassade) La sociologie [Sociology], Paris: Seghers, 1971.
- Les analyseurs de l'Église: analyse institutionnelle en milieu chrétien [The analysts of the church: institutional analysis in Christianity], Paris: Anthropos, 1972
- L'etat-inconscient [The unconscious state], Paris: Editions de Minuit, 1978
- Le Journal de recherche: matériaux d'une théorie de l'implication [The research diary: materials for a theory of implication], Paris: Méridiens Klincksieck, 1988
- (with Jacques Ardoino) Les pédagogies institutionnelles [Institutional pedagogies], Paris: Presses universitaires de France, 1994.
- Le principe de subsidiarité contre l'Europe [The principle of subsidiarity against Europe], Paris: Presses universitaires de France, 1997
