= Célestin Freinet =

French pedagogue

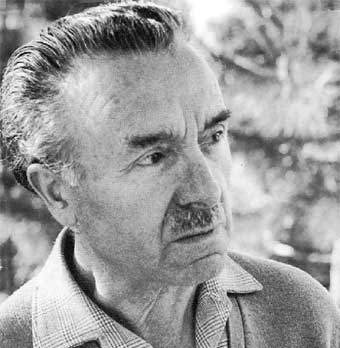
Freinet in 1960

Célestin Freinet ([seləsˈtɛ̃ fʀeˈnɛ], 15 October 1896 in Gars, Alpes-Maritimes – 8 October 1966 in Vence) was a French pedagogue and educational reformer.

== Early life ==
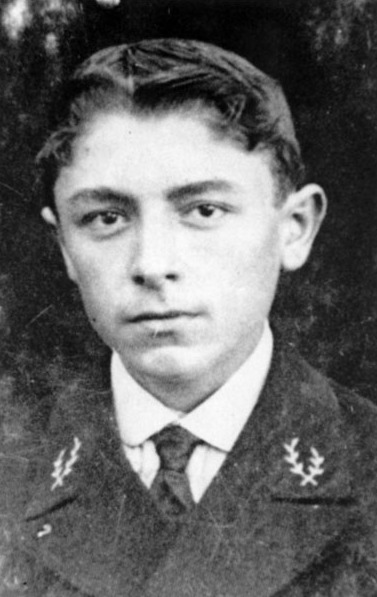
Freinet in 1914

Freinet was born in Provence as the fifth of eight children. His own schooldays were deeply unpleasant to him and would affect his teaching methods and desire for reform. In 1915 he was recruited into the French army and was wounded in the lung, an experience that led him to becoming a resolute pacifist.

In 1920 he became an elementary schoolteacher in the village of Le Bar-sur-Loup. It was here that Freinet began to develop his teaching methods. He married Élise Lagier in 1926.

== Educational reforms ==
In 1923 Freinet purchased a printing press, originally to assist with his teaching, since his lung injury made it difficult for him to talk for long periods. It was with this press he printed free texts and class newspapers for his students. The children would compose their own works on the press and would discuss and edit them as a group before presenting them as a team effort. They would regularly leave the classroom to conduct field trips. The newspapers were exchanged with those from other schools. Gradually the group texts replaced conventional school books.

Freinet created the teachers' trade union C.E.L. (Coopérative de l'Enseignement Laïc) in 1924, from which arose the French teacher movement Modern School Movement (Mouvement de l'École Moderne). The goal of the C.E.L was to change public education from the inside with the co-operation of teachers.

Freinet's teaching methods were at variance with official policy of the National Education Board, and he resigned from it in 1935 to start his own school in Vence.

== Concepts of Freinet's pedagogy ==
- Pedagogy of work (pédagogie du travail): pupils were encouraged to learn by making products or providing services.
- Enquiry-based learning (tâtonnement expérimental): group-based trial and error work.
- Cooperative learning (travail coopératif): pupils were to co-operate in the production process.
- Centres of interest (complexe d'intérêt): the children's interests and natural curiosity are starting points for a learning process
- The natural method (méthode naturelle): authentic learning by using real experiences of children.
- Democracy: children learn to take responsibility for their own work and for the whole community by using democratic self-government.

In 1964, Freinet drafted the pedagogical constants. Freinet laid out these constants to enable teachers to evaluate their class practices in relation to his basic values and thus appreciate the path that remains to be followed. "It is a new range of academic values that we would like to work here to establish, with no bias other than our preoccupation for the search for truth, in the light of experience and common sense. On the basis of these principles, which we shall regard as invariable and therefore unassailable and sure, we would like to achieve a kind of pedagogical code ... "The Pedagogical Code has several colored lights to help educators judge their psychological and pedagogical situation as teachers:

- Green light: for practices conforming to these constants, in which educators can engage without apprehension because they are assured of a comforting success.
- Red light: for practices not conforming to these constants and which must therefore be proscribed as soon as possible.
- Orange and blinking light: for practices that in certain circumstances may be beneficial but which are likely to be dangerous and toward which one must advance only cautiously in the hope of soon moving past them.

The constants cited below are only a part, a sort of summary of the pedagogical work of Celestin Freinet.

1. The child is of the same nature as us [adults].
2. Being bigger does not necessarily mean being above others.
3. A child's academic behavior is a function of his constitution, health, and physiological state.
4. No one – neither the child nor the adult – likes to be commanded by authority.
5. No one likes to align oneself, because to align oneself is to obey passively an external order.
6. No one likes to be forced to do a certain job, even if this work does not displease him or her particularly. It is being forced that is paralyzing.
7. Everyone likes to choose their job, even if this choice is not advantageous.
8. No one likes to move mindlessly, to act like a robot, that is to do acts, to bend to thoughts that are prescribed in mechanisms in which he does not participate.
9. We [the teachers] need to motivate the work.
10. No more scholasticism.
  1. Everyone wants to succeed. Failure is inhibitory, destructive of progress and enthusiasm.
  2. It is not games that are natural to the child, but work.
11. The normal path of [knowledge] acquisition is not observation, explanation and demonstration, the essential process of the School, but experimental trial and error, a natural and universal process.
12. Memorization, which the School deals with in so many cases, is applicable and valuable only when it is truly in service of life.
13. [Knowledge] acquisition does not take place as one sometimes believes, by the study of rules and laws, but by experience. To study these rules and laws in [language], in art, in mathematics, in science, is to place the cart before the horse.
14. Intelligence is not, as scholasticism teaches, a specific faculty functioning as a closed circuit, independent of the other vital elements of the individual.
15. The School only cultivates an abstract form of intelligence, which operates outside living reality, by means of words and ideas implanted by memorization.
16. The child does not like to listen to an ex cathedra lesson.
17. The child does not tire of doing work that is in line with his life, work which is, so to speak, functional for him.
18. No one, neither child nor adult, likes control and punishment, which is always considered an attack on one's dignity, especially when exercised in public.
19. Grades and rankings are always a mistake.
20. Speak as little as possible.
21. The child does not like the work of a herd to which the individual has to fold like a robot. He loves individual work or teamwork in a cooperative community.
22. Order and discipline are needed in class.
23. Punishments are always a mistake. They are humiliating for all and never achieve the desired goal. They are at best a last resort.
24. The new life of the School presupposes school cooperation, that is, the management by its users, including the educator, of life and school work.
25. Class overcrowding is always a pedagogical error.
26. The current design of large school complexes results in the anonymity of teachers and pupils; It is, therefore, always an error and a hindrance.
27. The democracy of tomorrow is being prepared by democracy at the School. An authoritarian regime at the School cannot be formative of democratic citizens.
28. One can only educate in dignity. Respecting children, who must respect their masters, is one of the first conditions for the redemption of the School.
29. The opposition of the pedagogical reaction, an element of the social and political reaction, is also a constant, with whom we shall have, alas! to reckon unless we are able to avoid or correct it ourselves.
30. There is also a constant that justifies all our trial and error and authenticates our action: it is the optimistic hope in life.

== Legacy ==
Freinet's work lives on in the name of Pédagogie Freinet, or the Freinet Modern School Movement, practised in many countries worldwide. Guided Functional Peer Support is primarily based on his pedagogic work.

The Freinet classification ("To organise everything") is used in the libraries of some elementary schools, and was invented by Célestin Freinet to facilitate the easy finding of documents, and the use of the "Bibliothèque de travail".

The Institut universitaire de formation des maîtres (teacher training university) of Nice bears the name of Célestin Freinet.

=== Modern School Movement ===
The Modern School Movement or Mouvement de l'École Moderne, based on the practices of the Freinets, has become an international network of educators and schools. In 1957, the International Federation of Modern School Movements (FIMEM) was founded to organize national groups around the world. They hold an international congress every two years to coordinate work and exchange ideas.

=== Célestin Freinet based Schools ===
Brazil

- Centro Educacional de Niterói
- Colégio Integral
- Escola Curumim, Campinas
- Escola Oca dos Curumins, São Carlos

Canada

- École Alternative Nouvelle-Querbes, Montreal

Colombia

- Colegio Académico Celestin Freinet, Bogotá
- Colegio Freinet, Cali

Denmark

- Freinetskolen Valbylanggade, Valby
- Trekronergade Freinetskole, Valby

Lebanon

- Lycée Célestin Freinet, Bramiyeh

Mexico

- Celestin Freinet Xalapa
- Escuela Experimental Freinet, San Andrés Tuxtla
- Manuel Bartolomé Cossío

Sweden

- Freinetskolan Hugin, Norrtälje
- Freinetskolan Mimer, Norrtälje
- Freinetskolan Tallbacken

The Netherlands

- De Nieuwe Regentesseschool, Utrecht

== Publications ==
- 1946: L'École Moderne Française.
- 1994: Œuvres pédagogiques, 2 vols. Paris: Seuil. (Edited by Madeleine Bens-Freinet, introduction par Jacques Bens:
  - Tome 1 : L’éducation du travail [1942-1943] – Essai de psychologie sensible appliquée à l’éducation [1943].
  - Tome 2 : L’école moderne française [1943. Autre titre : Pour l'école du peuple, 1969] – Les dits de Matthieu [1954] – Méthode naturelle de lecture [1963] – Les invariants pédagogiques [1964] – Méthode naturelle de dessin – Les genèses.
- Touché ! Souvenirs d'un blessé de guerre, récit, Ateliers du Gué, 1996.

== See also ==
- Popular education
