= Pele (name) =

Pele is a masculine given name, surname and nickname.

Variant forms include Pelé and Pellè.

== People with this nickname or professional name ==
Male

- Pelé (Edson Arantes do Nascimento; 1940–2022), Brazilian footballer
- Pelé (footballer, born 1973) (José Maria da Cruz Martins), football player and coach born in São Tomé or Principe
- Pelé (footballer, born 1978) (Pedro Miguel Cardoso Monteiro), Cape Verdean-Portuguese football defender
- Pelé (footballer, born 1987) (Vítor Hugo Gomes Passos), Portuguese football midfielder
- Pelé (footballer, born 1991) (Judilson Mamadu Tuncará Gomes), Portuguese football midfielder of Guinea-Bissau descent

Female

- Pele de Lappe (1916–2007), American social realist artist

=== People with this given name ===
- Pele Koljonen (born 1988), Finnish footballer
- Pele Paelay (born 1984), American basketball player
- Pelé Reid (born 1973), British boxer

=== People with this surname ===
- Pele (surname)
- Pelé (surname)

== See also ==
- Pelle (given name)
- Pelle (surname)
- Peele, surname

== See also ==
- Pele (disambiguation)
