= Pele (disambiguation) =

Pelé (Edson Arantes do Nascimento; 1940–2022) was a Brazilian footballer.

Pele or Pelé may also refer to:

== Film ==
- Pele Eterno, 2004 documentary film about the Brazilian football player Pelé
- Pelé: Birth of a Legend, 2016 film about the Brazilian football player Pelé
- Pelé (2021 film), a biographical documentary film about Brazilian footballer Pelé

== Music ==
- Pele (American band)
- Pele (English band)
- Pelé (album), a 1977 soundtrack album by Sérgio Mendes for a documentary about the footballer's life
- "Pelé", a song by Pólo Norte from the album Deixa o Mundo Girar

== People ==
- Pele (name), given name, surname and nickname
- Pelé (footballer, born 1973) (José Maria da Cruz Martins), football player and coach born in São Tomé and Principe
- Pelé (footballer, born 1978) (Pedro Miguel Cardoso Monteiro), Cape Verdean-Portuguese football defender
- Pelé (footballer, born 1987) (Vítor Hugo Gomes Passos), Portuguese football midfielder
- Pelé (footballer, born 1991) (Judilson Mamadu Tuncará Gomes), Portuguese football midfielder of Guinea-Bissau descent
- Roger Pelé (1901–1982), French long-distance runner

== Science and geography ==
- Pele (crab), a genus of crabs in the family Portunidae
- Pele, the Hungarian name for Becheni village, Săuca Commune, Satu Mare County, Romania
- 2202 Pele, an asteroid
- Pele (island), a volcanic island located in the Shefa Province in Vanuatu
- Pele (Aegean island), an island in the Aegean Sea off modern Turkey
- Pele (Cos), a town of ancient Cos, Greece
- Pele (Thessaly), a town of ancient Thessaly, Greece
- Pele (volcano), an active volcano on Jupiter's moon Io

== Other uses ==
- Pele (deity), the Fire Goddess, is the goddess of fire, lightning, wind and volcanoes and the creator of the Hawaiian Islands

== See also ==
- Pelee (disambiguation)
- Pelle (disambiguation)
- Peleus (disambiguation)
- Boys for Pele, third album by American musician Tori Amos
- Pele's hair, a form of lava
- Peléan eruption, a type of volcanic eruption
- Pele FC, an association football club from Guyana
- Pelé's Soccer, a 1981 video game
- Pele tower, small fortified keep along the English and Scottish Borders
- Pelé dos Santos, character in the film The Life Aquatic with Steve Zissou
