= 1902 eruption of Mount Pelée =

Volcanic eruption on Martinique

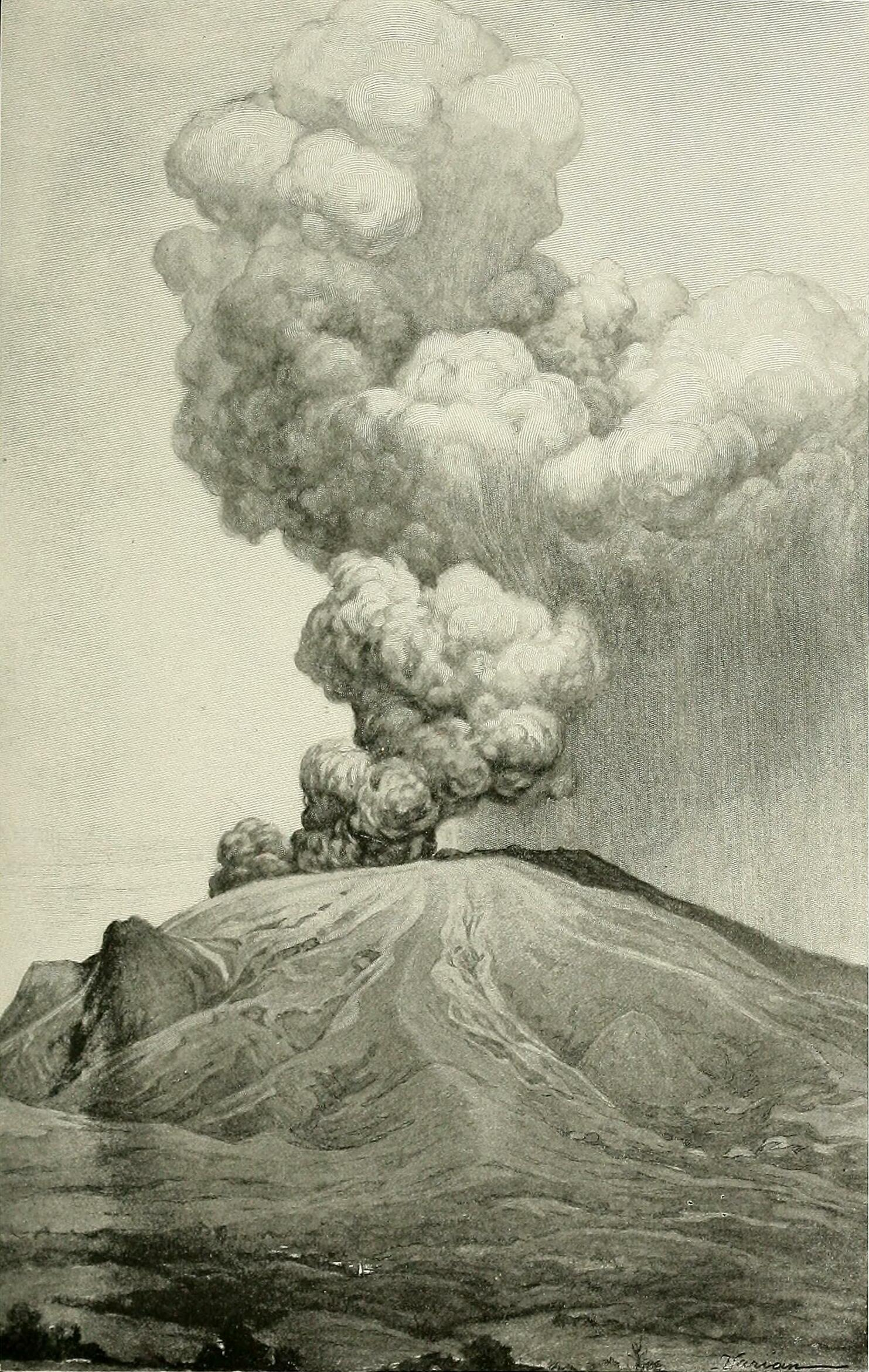
- Eruption column on 27 May 1902
- Volcano: Mount Pelée
- Start date: 23 April 1902
- End date: 5 October 1905
- Type: Phreatic, Peléan
- Location: Martinique, France; 14°48′27″N 61°10′03″W
- VEI: 4
- Impact: Approximately 29,000 deaths; deadliest eruption of the 20th century.

The 1902 eruption of Mount Pelée was a volcanic eruption on the island of Martinique in the Lesser Antilles Volcanic Arc of the eastern Caribbean, which was one of the deadliest eruptions in recorded history. Eruptive activity began on 23 April as a series of phreatic eruptions from the summit of Mount Pelée. Within days, the vigor of these eruptions exceeded anything witnessed since the island was settled by Europeans. The intensity then subsided for a few days until early May, when the phreatic eruptions increased again. Lightning laced the eruption clouds and trade winds dumped ash on villages to the west. Heavy ash fell, sometimes causing total darkness. Some of the afflicted residents panicked and headed for the perceived safety of larger settlements, especially Saint-Pierre, about 10 km (6.2 mi) south of Pelée's summit. Saint-Pierre received its first ash fall on 3 May.

Mount Pelée remained relatively quiet until the afternoon of 5 May when a mudflow swept down a river on the southwest flank of the volcano, destroying a sugar mill. The massive flow buried about 150 people and generated a series of three tsunamis as it hit the sea. The tsunamis swept along the coast, damaging buildings and boats. The explosions resumed the night of 5 May. The following morning, parts of the eruption plume became incandescent, signifying that the character of the eruption had changed. The phreatic eruptions had finally given way to magmatic eruptions as magma reached the surface. These eruptions continued through the next day and night.

A brief lull was shattered by a tremendous eruption at about 8:00 a.m. on 8 May. A ground-hugging cloud of incandescent lava particles, suspended by searing turbulent gases called a pyroclastic surge, moved at hurricane speed down the southwest flank of the volcano. The surge reached Saint-Pierre at 8:02 a.m. Escape from the city was virtually impossible. Almost everyone within the city proper—about 28,000 people—died, most burned or buried by falling masonry. The hot ash ignited a firestorm, fueled by smashed buildings and countless casks of rum. One survivor within the city was a prisoner (Ludger Sylbaris) who was locked in a windowless jail cell, later being discovered by rescue workers. At least two others survived within the city, as well as a few tens of people caught at the margins of the cloud; most of these survivors were badly burned.

Explosive activity on 20 May resulted in another 2,000 deaths as rescuers, engineers and mariners brought supplies to the island. A powerful eruption on 30 August generated a pyroclastic flow that resulted in over 800 people killed. The eruption continued until 5 October 1905.

== Before the eruption ==
Before the 1902 eruption, as early as the mid-19th century, signs of increased fumarole activity were present in the Étang Sec (Dry Pond) crater near the summit. Relatively minor phreatic eruptions that occurred in 1792 and 1851 were evidence that the volcano was active and potentially dangerous. The indigenous Carib people were aware of the mountain's volcanic activity from previous eruptions in ancient times.

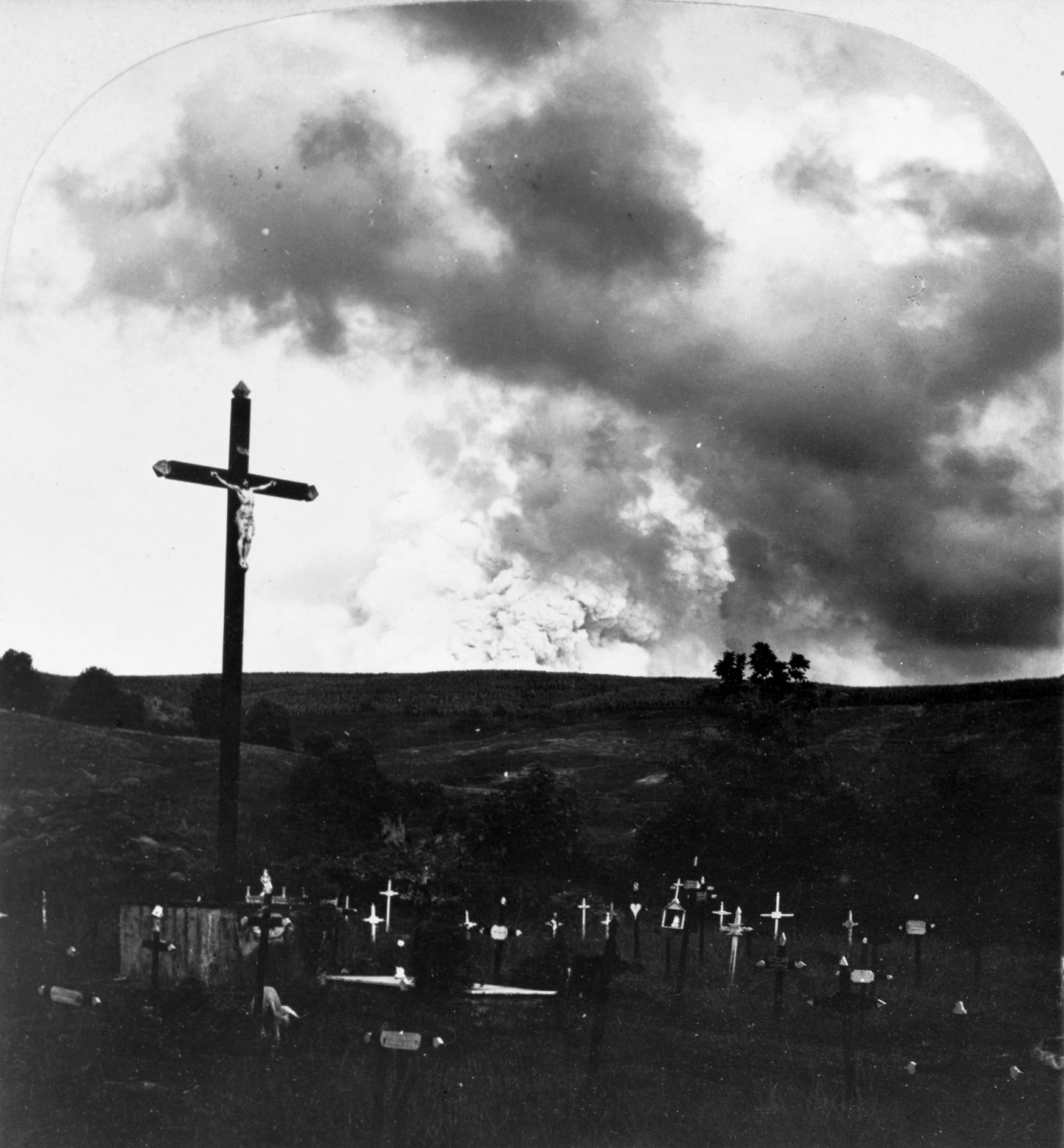
1902 eruption

Eruptions began on 23 April 1902. In early April, excursionists noted the appearance of sulfurous vapors emitting from fumaroles near the mountaintop. This was not regarded as important, as fumaroles had appeared and disappeared in the past. On 23 April, there was a light rain of cinders on the mountain's southern and western side, together with seismic activity. On 25 April, the mountain emitted a large cloud containing rocks and ashes from its top, where the Étang Sec caldera was located. The ejected material did not cause a significant amount of damage. On 26 April, the surroundings were dusted by volcanic ash from an explosion; the public authorities still did not see any cause for concern.

On 27 April, several excursionists climbed the mountaintop to find Étang Sec filled with water, forming a lake 180 m (590 ft) across. There was a 15 m (50 ft) high cone of volcanic debris built up on one side, feeding the lake with a steady stream of boiling water. Sounds resembling a cauldron with boiling water were heard from deep underground. The strong smell of sulfur was all over the city, 6.4 km (4.0 mi) away from the volcano, causing discomfort to people and horses. On 30 April Rivière des Pères and the river Roxelane swelled, carrying boulders and trees from the mountaintop. The villages of Prêcheur and Sainte-Philomène received a steady stream of ash.

At 11:30 p.m. on 2 May, the mountain produced loud explosions, earthquakes and a massive pillar of dense black smoke. Ashes and fine-grained pumice covered the entire northern half of the island. The explosions continued at 5–6 hour intervals. This led the local newspaper Les Colonies to indefinitely postpone a proposed picnic on the mountain, originally planned for 4 May. Farm animals started dying from hunger and thirst, as their sources of water and food were contaminated with ash.

On Saturday 3 May, the wind blew the ash cloud northwards, alleviating the situation in Saint-Pierre. The next day the ash fall intensified, and the communication between Saint-Pierre and the Prêcheur district was severed. The ash cloud was so dense that the coastal boats feared navigating through it. Many citizens decided to flee the city, filling the steamer lines to capacity. The area was covered with a layer of fine, flour-like white ash.

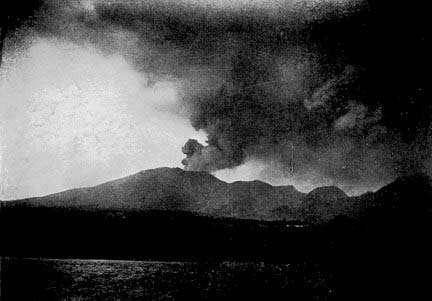
1902 eruption

On Monday 5 May, activity appeared to decrease, but at about 1:00 p.m. the sea suddenly receded about 100 m (330 ft) and then rushed back, flooding parts of the city, and a large cloud of smoke appeared westward of the mountain. One wall of the Étang Sec crater collapsed and propelled a mass of boiling water and mud (a lahar) into the Blanche River, flooded the Guérin sugar works and buried about 150 victims under 60 to 90 m (200 to 300 ft) of mud. Refugees from other areas rushed into Saint-Pierre. That night, the atmospheric disturbances disabled the electric grid, sank the city into darkness and added to the confusion.

The next day at about 02:00, loud sounds were heard from within the depths of the mountain. On Wednesday 7 May at around 04:00, activity increased; the clouds of ash caused numerous bolts of volcanic lightning around the mountaintop, and both craters glowed reddish orange into the night. Through the day, people were leaving the city, but more people from the countryside were attempting to find refuge in the city, increasing its population by several thousand. The newspapers still claimed the city was safe. News of the Soufrière volcano erupting on the nearby island of Saint Vincent reassured the people, who believed it was a sign that Mount Pelée's internal pressure was being relieved. However, Captain Marina Leboffe's barque Orsolina left the harbor with only half of his cargo of sugar loaded, despite shippers' protests and under threat of arrest. Leboffe, a native Neapolitan, reportedly told the port authorities, "I know nothing about Mt. Pelée, but if Vesuvius were looking the way your volcano looks this morning, I'd get out of Naples!" Many other civilians were refused permission to leave town. Governor Louis Mouttet and his wife stayed in the city, although he planned to make an excursion closer to the volcano in the morning. By the evening, Mount Pelée's tremors seemed to calm down again.

== Climactic phase ==
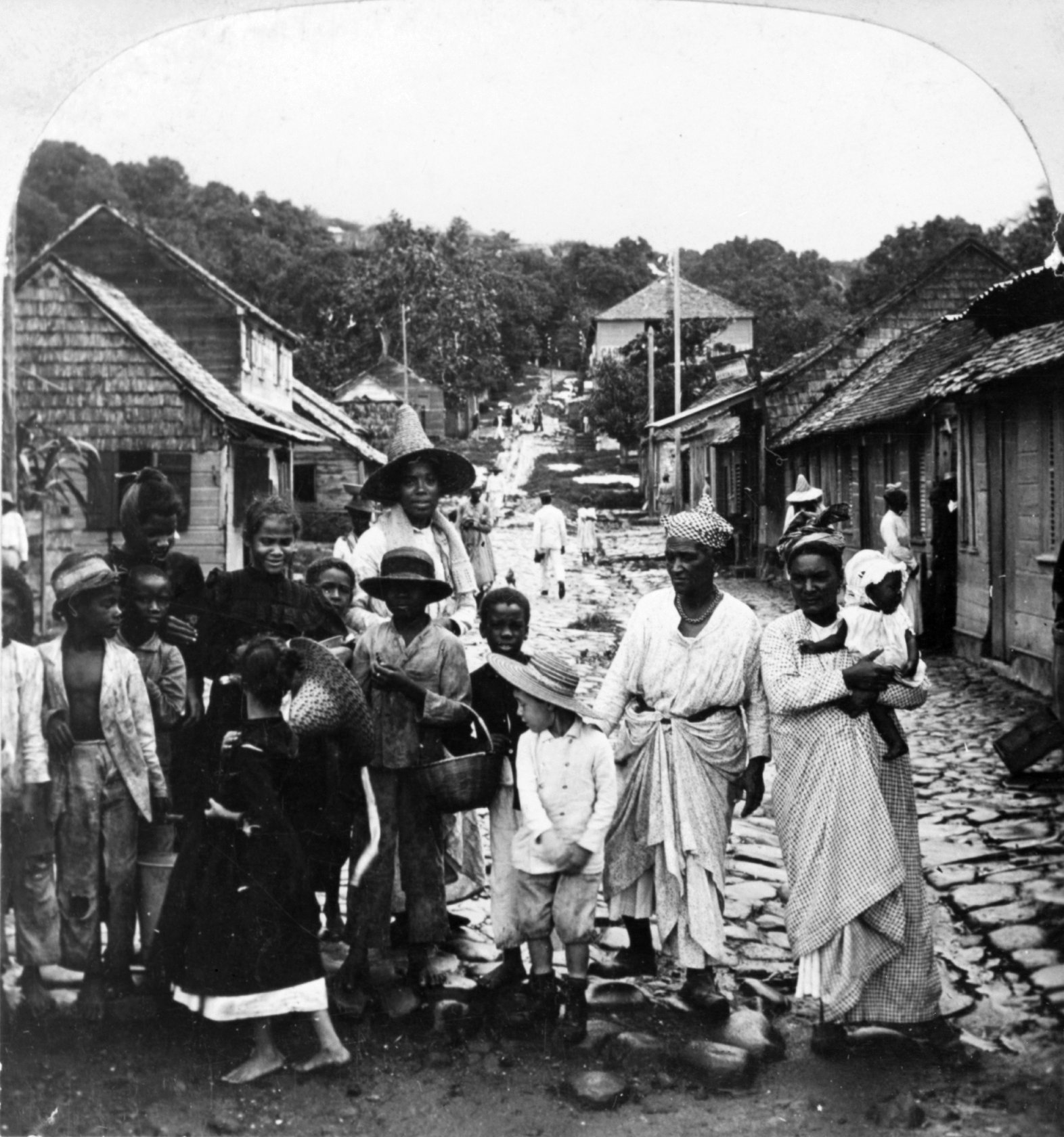
Evacuees on Rue du Pavé, Fort-de-France after 1902 eruption, photographed by William H. Rau

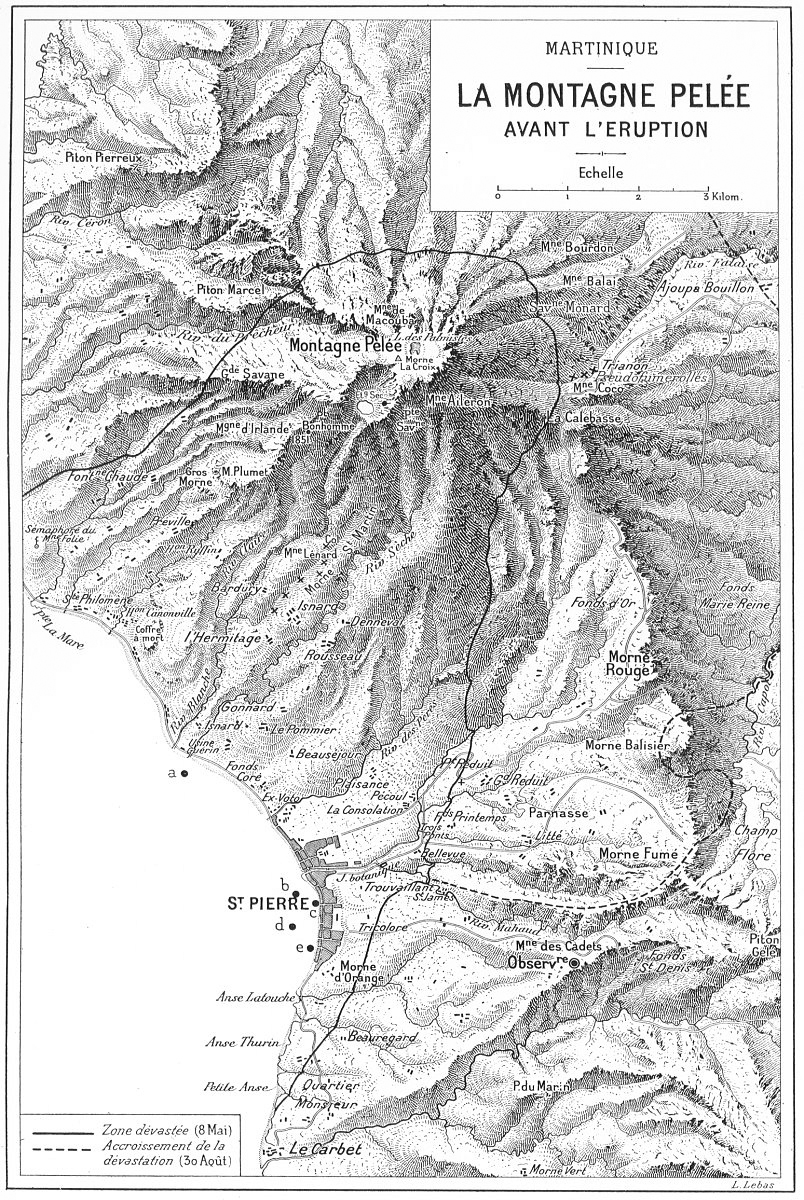
Relief map of the pyroclastic surges of Mount Pelee

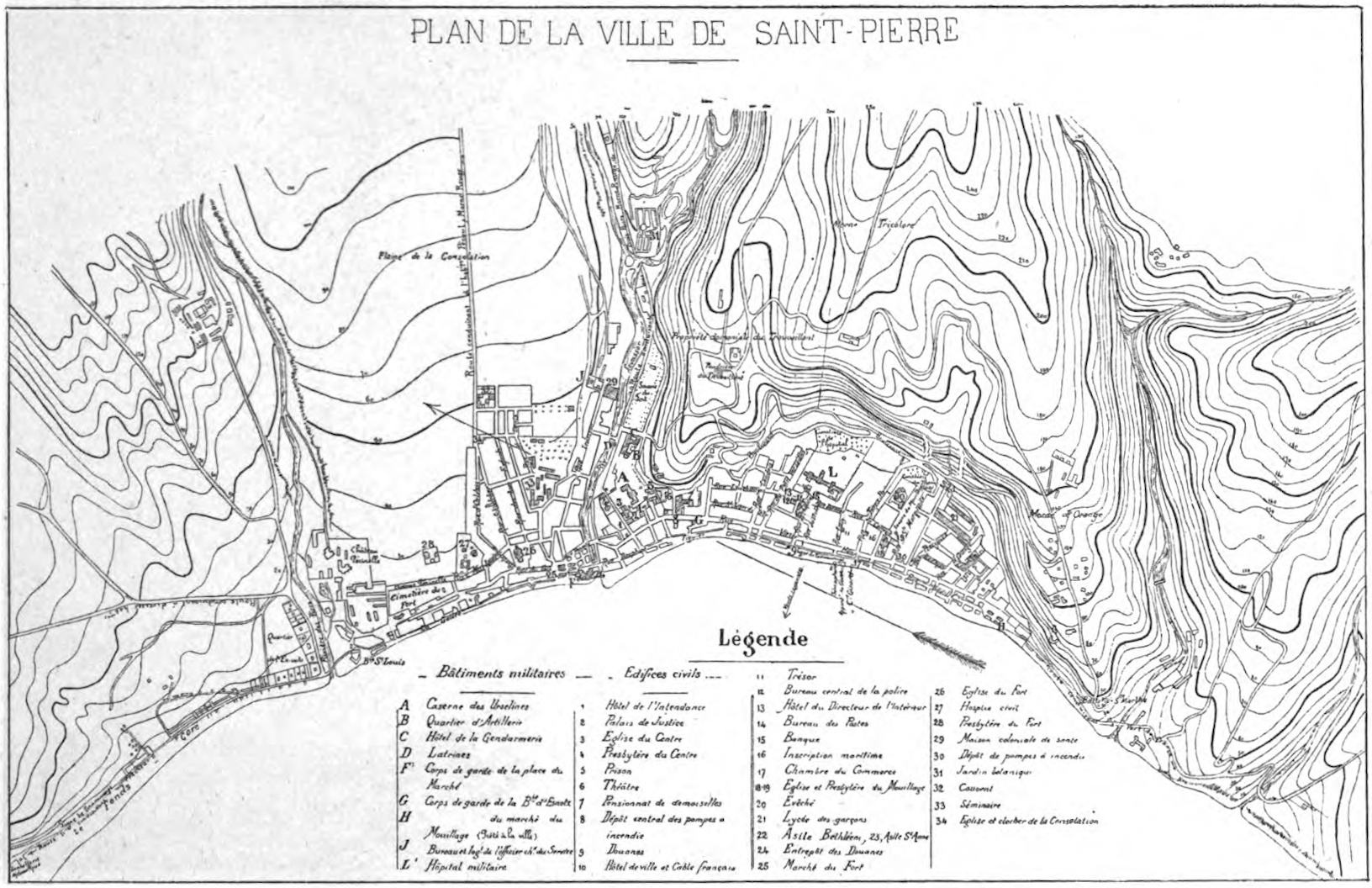
Map of St Pierre 1 January 1902

On Thursday morning 8 May, the night shift telegraph operator was sending the reports of the volcano's activity to the operator at Fort-de-France, claiming no significant new developments; his last transmission at 07:52 was "Allez", handing over the line to the remote operator. In the next second, the telegraph line went dead. The upper mountainside ripped open and a dense black cloud shot out horizontally. A second black cloud rolled upwards, forming a gigantic mushroom cloud and darkening the sky in an 80 km (50 mi) radius. The initial speed of both clouds was later calculated to be over 160 km/h (100 mph). The horizontal pyroclastic surge hugged the ground and sped down towards the city of Saint-Pierre, appearing black and heavy, glowing hot from within. It consisted of superheated steam and volcanic gases and dust, with temperatures exceeding 1,075 °C (1,967 °F). In under a minute it reached and covered the entire city, instantly igniting everything combustible. The cable repair ship, CS Grappler, floating offshore, was set on fire and sunk by the surge, with the loss of all hands. The Canadian cargo liner Roraïma was also set aflame and reduced to a burning wreck by the pyroclastic flow. The wreck is still present offshore of Saint-Pierre. Twenty-eight of her crew, and all passengers except two (nine year-old Margaret or Mary Stokes and her creole nurse or nanny), were killed.

A rush of wind followed, this time towards the mountain. Then came a half-hour downpour of muddy rain mixed with ashes. For the next several hours, all communication with the city was severed. Nobody knew what was happening, nor who had authority over the island, as the governor was unreachable and his status unknown.

There are unnamed eyewitnesses to the eruption, probably survivors on the boats at the time of the eruption. One eyewitness said "the mountain was blown to pieces—there was no warning," while another said "it was like a giant oil refinery." One said "the town vanished before our eyes." The area devastated by the pyroclastic cloud covered about 21 km^{2} (8 sq mi), with the city of Saint-Pierre taking the brunt of the damage.

At the time of the eruption, Saint-Pierre had a population of about 28,000, which had swollen with refugees from the minor explosions and mud flows first emitted by the volcano. Legend has previously reported that out of the 30,000 in the city, there were only two survivors: Louis-Auguste Cyparis, a felon held in a windowless cell in the town's jail for wounding a friend with a cutlass, and Léon Compère-Léandre, a man who lived at the edge of the city. In reality, there were a number of survivors who made their way out of the fringes of the blast zone. Many of these survivors—whose names and stories were never recorded—were badly burned, and some died later from their injuries. A number made their way to Le Carbet, just south of Saint-Pierre behind a ridge that protected that town from the worst of the pyroclastic flow; survivors were rescued on the beach there by Martinique officials.

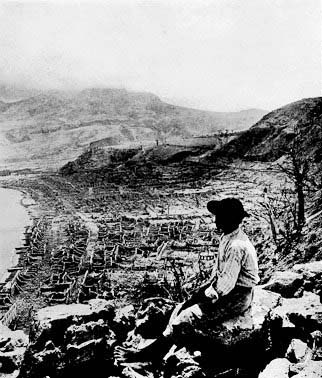
Remains of Saint-Pierre

Compère-Léandre stated the following when asked about his survival:

I felt a terrible wind blowing, the earth began to tremble, and the sky suddenly became dark. I turned to go into the house, with great difficulty climbed the three or four steps that separated me from my room, and felt my arms and legs burning, also my body. I dropped upon a table. At this moment four others sought refuge in my room, crying and writhing with pain, although their garments showed no sign of having been touched by flame. At the end of 10 minutes one of these, the young Delavaud girl, aged about 10 years, fell dead; the others left. I got up and went to another room, where I found the father Delavaud, still clothed and lying on the bed, dead. He was purple and inflated, but the clothing was intact. Crazed and almost overcome, I threw myself on a bed, inert and awaiting death. My senses returned to me in perhaps an hour, when I beheld the roof burning. With sufficient strength left, my legs bleeding and covered with burns, I ran to Fonds-Saint-Denis, six kilometers from Saint-Pierre.

One woman, a housemaid, also survived the pyroclastic flow but died soon after. She said that the only thing she remembered from the event was sudden heat. She died very shortly after being discovered. A third reported survivor was Havivra Da Ifrile, a 10-year-old girl who had rowed to shelter in a cave. Included among the victims were the passengers and crews of several ships docked at Saint-Pierre.

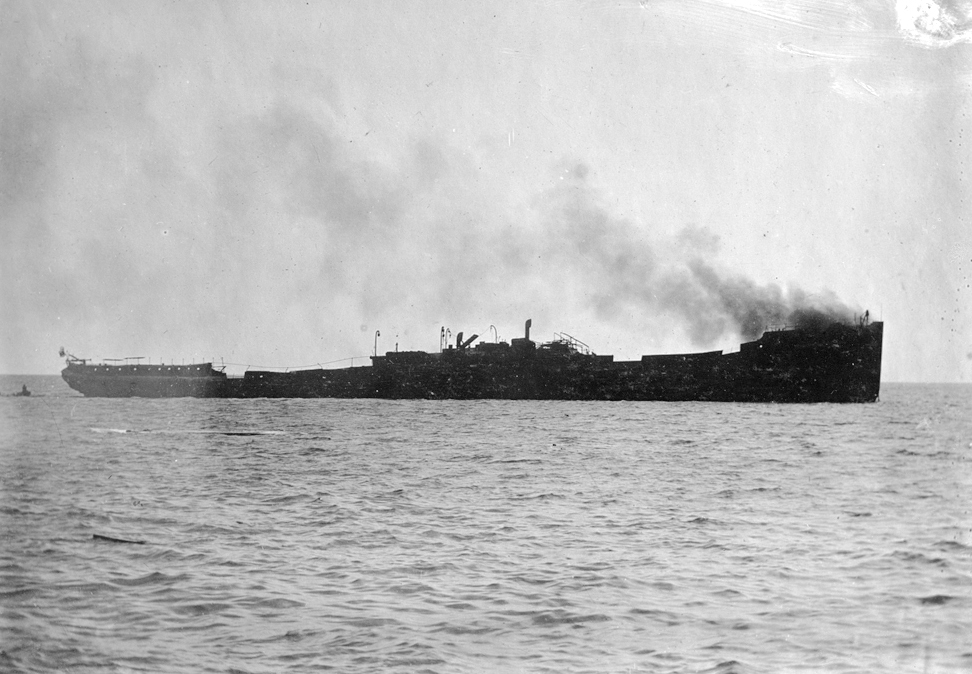
Remains of the Roraima before it sank

Among the May 8 fatalities were the American consul at Martinique, West Indies, Thomas T. Prentis, and his wife.

== Relief ==
At about 12:00, the acting governor of Martinique sent the cruiser Suchet to investigate what had happened and the warship arrived off the burning town at about 12:30. The fierce heat beat back landing parties until nearly 15:00, when the captain came ashore on the Place Bertin, the tree-shaded square with cafés near the center of town. Not a tree was standing; the denuded trunks, scorched and bare, lay prone, torn out by the roots. The ground was littered with dead. Fire and a suffocating stench prevented any deeper exploration of the burning ruins.

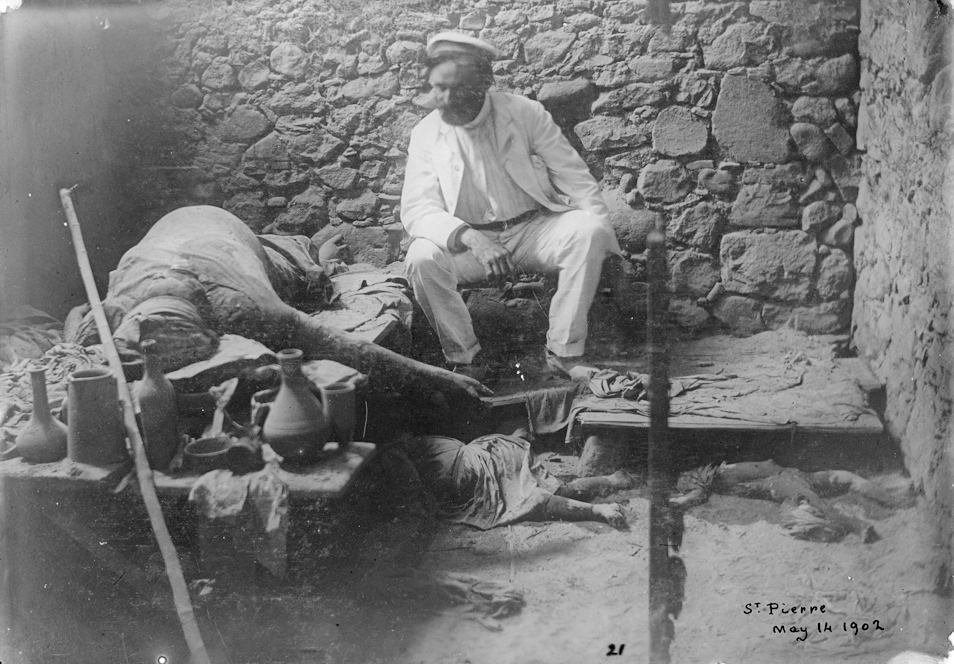
May 14, 1902 remains of victims

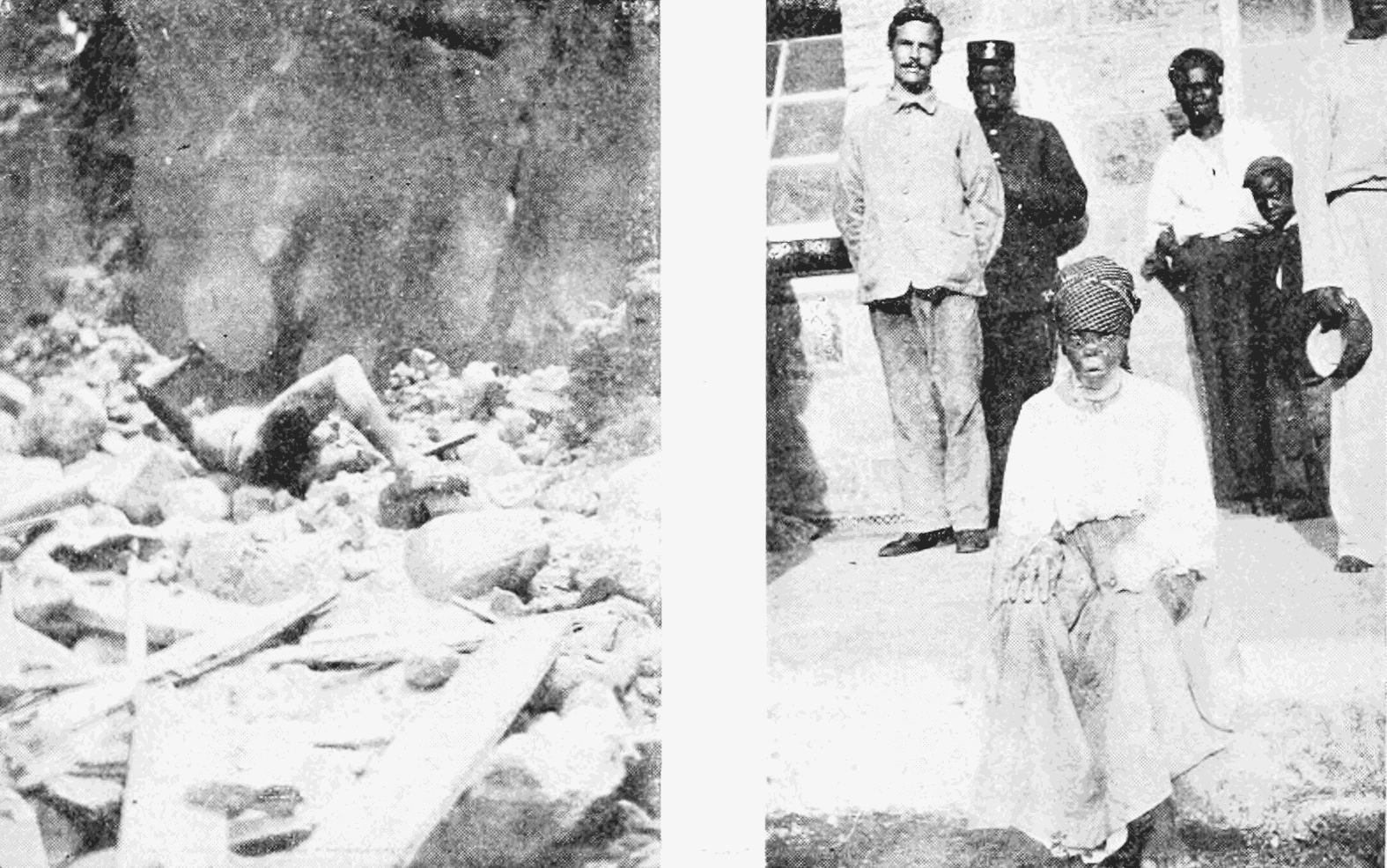
Remains of victims of the 1902 disaster

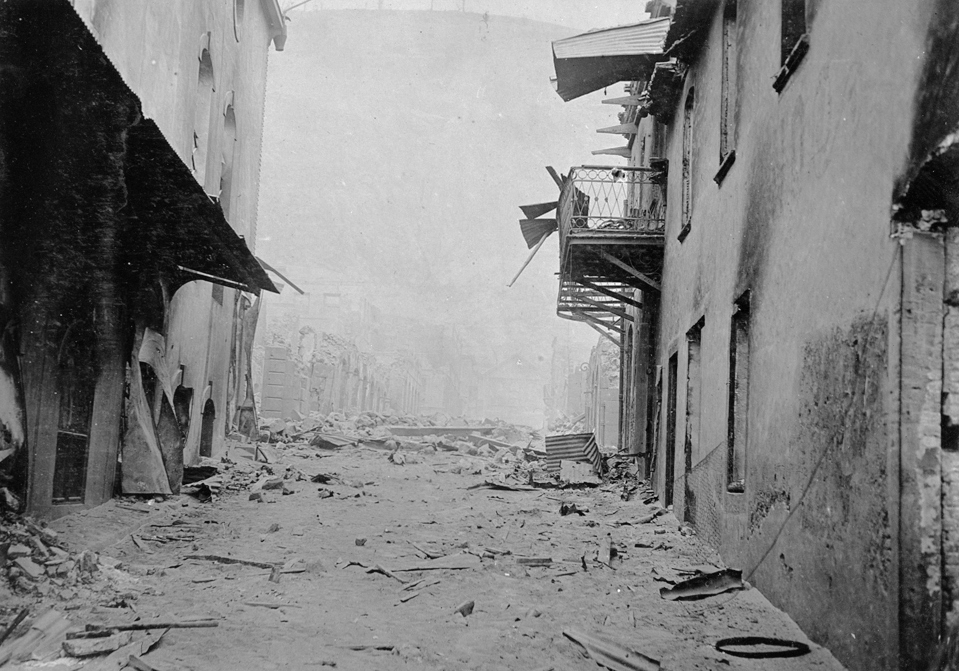
Mt. Pelee- (View of street next to Caminade's store, St. Pierre, Martinique)

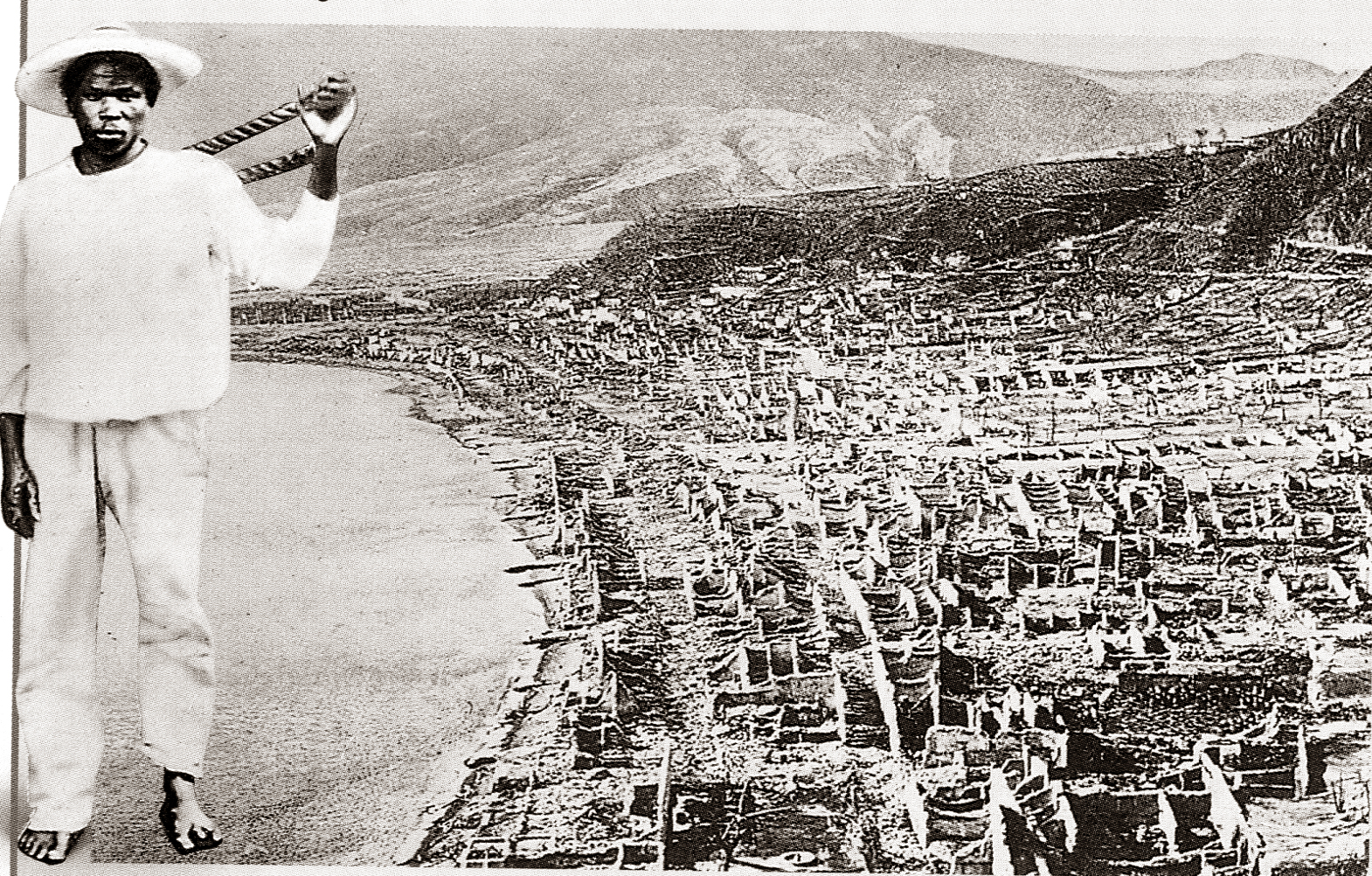
Views of St. Pierre, ruins (Ludger Sylbaris at left?)

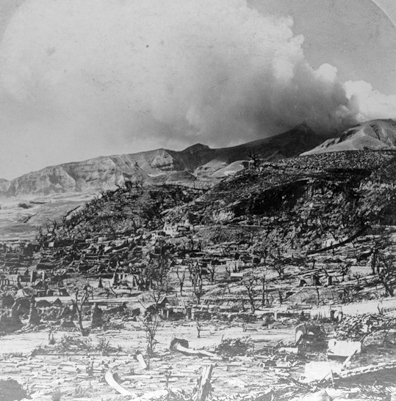
Desolate City of the Dead, St. Pierre, Martinique, F. W. I.

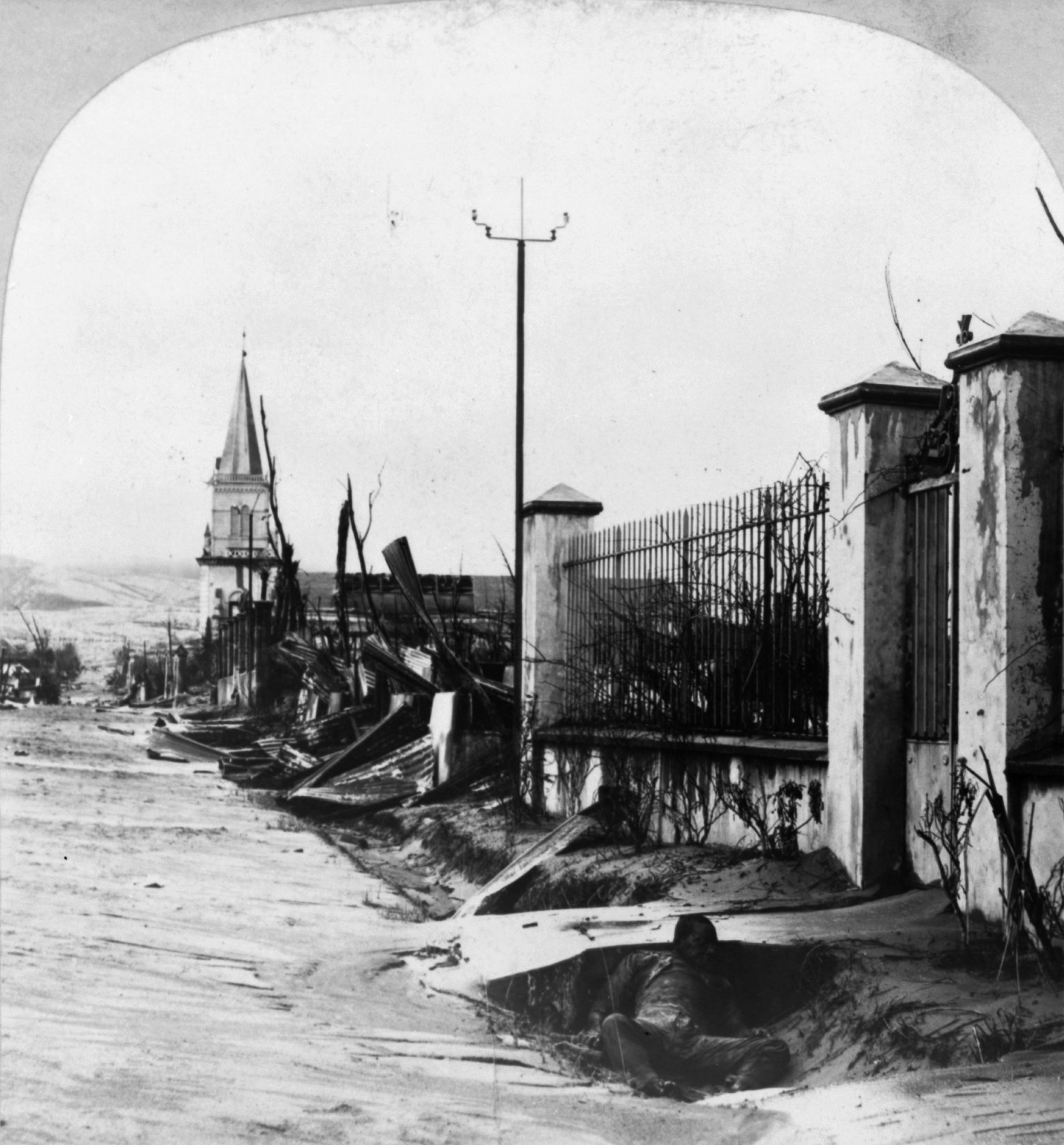
Main Street, Le Morne-Rouge, after the August 30 eruption

Meanwhile, a number of survivors had been plucked from the sea by small boats; they were sailors who had been blown into the water by the impact of the blast, and who had clung to wreckage for hours. All were badly burned. In the village of Le Carbet, shielded from the fiery cloud by a high promontory at the southern end of the city, were more victims, also badly burned; few of these lived longer than a few hours.

The area of devastation covered about 20 km^{2} (10 sq mi). Inside this area, the annihilation of life and property was total; outside was a second, clearly defined zone where there were casualties, but the material damage was less, while beyond this lay a strip in which vegetation was scorched but life was spared. Many victims were in casual attitudes, their features calm and reposeful, indicating that the eruption blast had reached them without warning; others were contorted in anguish. The clothing had been torn from nearly all the victims struck down outdoors. Some houses were almost pulverized; it was impossible even for those familiar with the city to identify the foundations of the city landmarks. The city burned for days. Sanitation parties gradually penetrated the ruins, to dispose of the dead by burning; burial was not possible given the number of dead. Thousands of victims lay under a shroud of ashes, heaped in windrows metres deep, caked by the rains; many of these bodies were not retrieved for weeks, and few were identifiable.

The United States quickly offered help to Martinique's authorities. On 12 May, U.S. President Theodore Roosevelt instructed the secretaries of war, navy, and treasury to start relief measures at once. Multiple U.S. ships were dispatched to the island with haste, namely the cruiser Cincinnati, lying at Santo Domingo; the Dixie, a converted freighter which carried Army rations, medical supplies and doctors; and the Navy tug Potomac at San Juan, Puerto Rico. President Roosevelt asked Congress for an immediate appropriation of $500,000 for emergency assistance to the victims of the calamity. Roosevelt said: "One of the greatest calamities in history has befallen our neighboring island of Martinique ... The city of St. Pierre has ceased to exist ... The government of France ... informs us that Fort-de-France and the entire island of Martinique are still threatened. They therefore request that, for the purpose of rescuing the people who are in such deadly peril and threatened with starvation, the government of the United States may send as soon as possible the means of transporting them from the stricken island." The U.S. Congress voted for $200,000 of immediate assistance and set hearings to determine what larger sum might be needed when the full nature of the disaster could be learned. In an appeal for public funds, Roosevelt empowered postmasters to receive donations for relief of the victims. A national committee of prominent citizens also took charge of chartering supply ships.

Canada, the UK, Germany, France, Italy, Denmark, Japan, Russia, and the Vatican also offered help.

== Subsequent activity ==
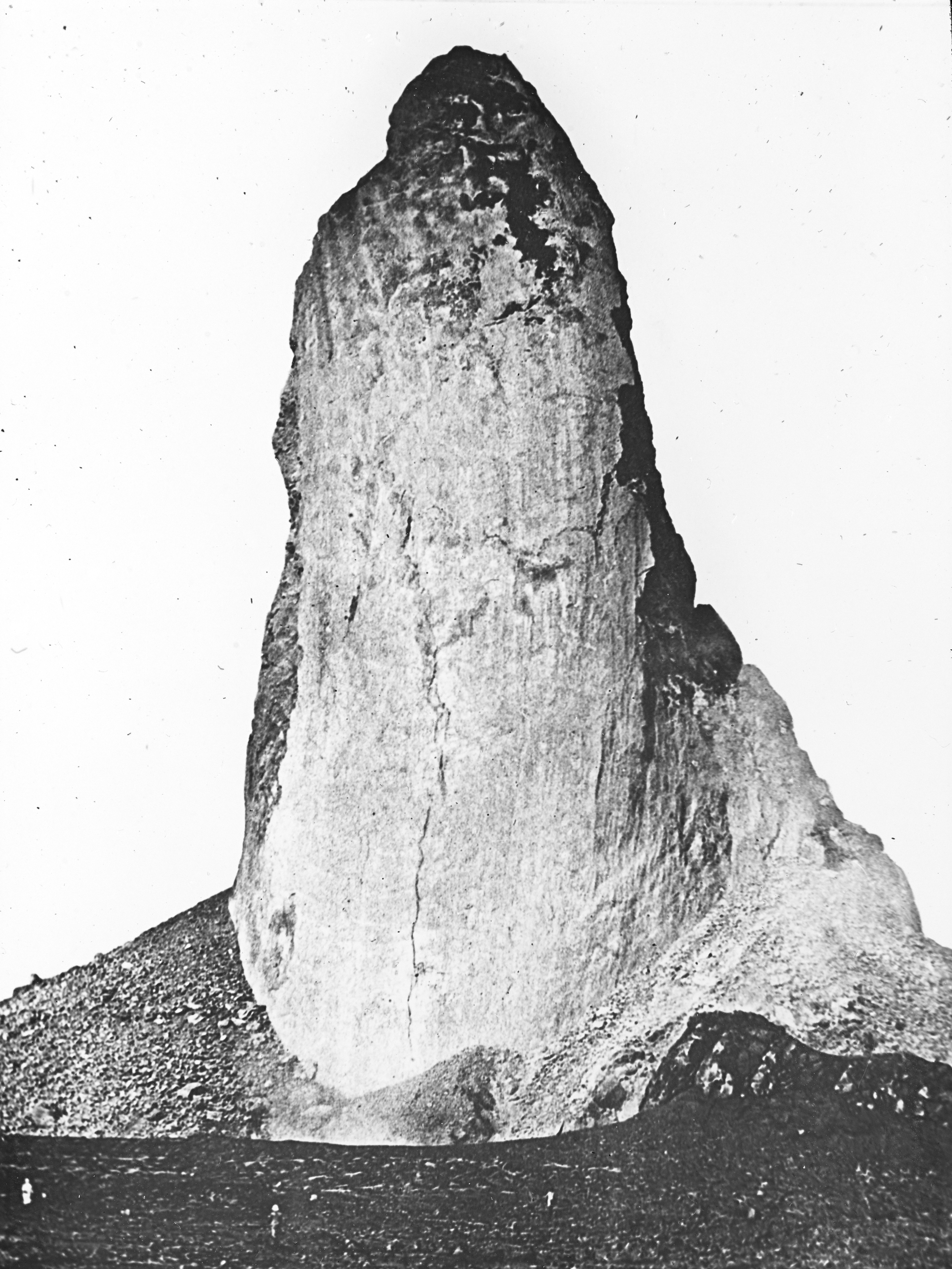
The volcanic spine of Mount Pelée

On May 20, a second eruption similar to the first one in both type and force obliterated what was left of Saint-Pierre, killing 2,000 rescuers, engineers, and mariners bringing supplies to the island. During a powerful eruption on August 30, a pyroclastic flow extended further east than the flows of May 8 and 20. Although not quite as powerful as the previous two eruptions, the August 30 pyroclastic flow struck Morne Rouge, killing at least 800, Ajoupa-Bouillon (250 fatalities), parts of Basse-Pointe (25 fatalities), and Morne-Capot (10 dead). A tsunami caused some damage in Le Carbet. To date, this was the last fatal eruption of Mount Pelée.

Beginning in October 1902, a large lava spine grew from the crater floor in the Étang Sec crater, reaching a maximum width of about 100 to 150 m (300 to 500 ft) and a height of about 300 m (1,000 ft). Called the "Needle of Pelée" or "Pelée's Tower", it grew 15 m (50 ft) a day, achieving more or less the same volume as the Great Pyramid of Egypt. After 5 months of growth, the unstable mass collapsed into a pile of rubble in March 1903.

The eruption eventually ended on October 5, 1905.

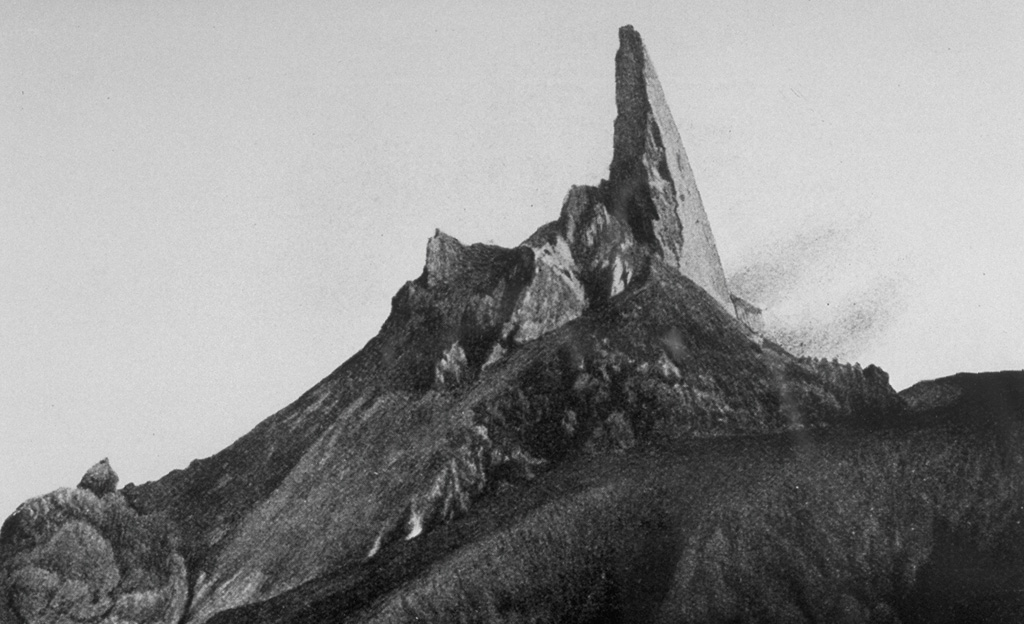
Southern face of Mount Pelée's lava spine showing the smoothly extruded eastern side

== Effects ==
The study of the causes of the disaster marked the beginning of modern volcanology with the definition and the analysis of the deadliest volcanic hazard: pyroclastic flows and surges, also known as nuées ardentes (Fr: burning clouds). Eruptions of a similar type are now known as "Peléan eruptions." Among those who studied Mount Pelée were Alfred Lacroix and Angelo Heilprin. Lacroix was the first to describe the nuée ardente (pyroclastic flow) phenomenon.

The destruction caused by the 1902 eruption was quickly publicized by recent modern means of communication. It brought to the attention of the public and governments the hazards and dangers of an active volcano.

== See also ==
- The Eruption of Mount Pelee – 1902 French film by Georges Méliès
- List of volcanic eruptions 1500–1999
- List of volcanic eruptions by death toll
- 1902 eruption of Santa María
- 1951 eruption of Mount Lamington
