= Ludger Sylbaris =

Survivor of the 1902 Mount Pelée volcanic eruption

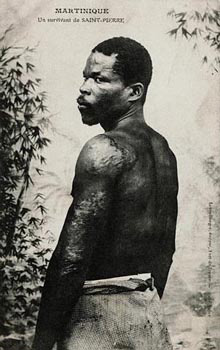
- A postcard featuring Sylbaris/Cyparis labelled "survivor of Saint-Pierre".
- Born: 1 June 1874; Le Prêcheur, Martinique
- Died: 1929 (aged 54–55); Panama
- Other names: Louis-Auguste Cyparis; Louis Sanson; Samson
- Known for: Surviving the 1902 eruption of Mount Pelée

Ludger Sylbaris (1 June 1874 – c. 1929, aged 55), also known as Louis-Auguste Cyparis, was a Martiniquais sailor who became known as one of three known survivors of the 1902 eruption of Mount Pelée on Martinique. The event killed an estimated 30,000 people in Saint Pierre, known as the "Paris of the West Indies", located at the base of the volcano, when a pyroclastic flow engulfed the city, completely destroying it.

Sylbaris was shielded from the immediate blast and its effects, including heat, debris, volcanic gas and ash, in an isolated outdoor jail cell. Four days after the eruption, a rescue team heard Sylbaris' cries from the rubble of the prison. Although badly burned, he survived and was able to provide an account of the event. Sylbaris travelled with the Barnum & Bailey circus and became something of an early 20th-century celebrity.

== Background ==
Ludger Sylbaris was born on 1 June 1874, on the Habitation La Donneau plantation, near the fishing village of Le Prêcheur, Martinique, about 9 kilometres (5.6 mi) north of Saint-Pierre. His parents were Eucher Sylbaris and Augusta Doreur.

Sylbaris worked as a sailor and common labourer in the subprefecture Saint-Pierre, in the shadow of the volcano Mount Pelée. His last known employment was in 1901, as a farm worker on the Canoville sugarcane plantation in Le Prêcheur.

== Saint-Pierre and the eruption ==
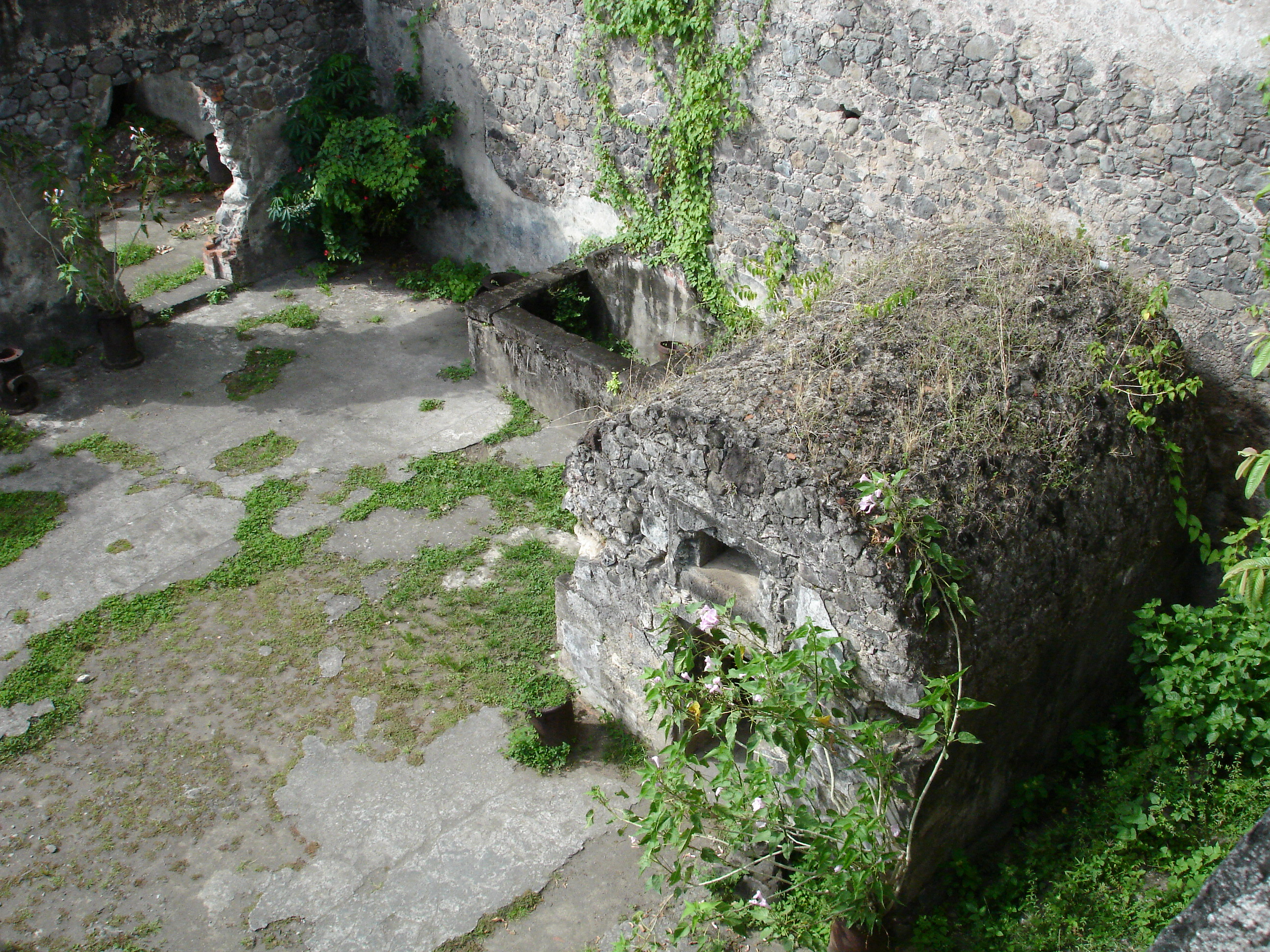
Remains of the cell in which Sylbaris survived

Sylbaris was frequently in trouble with the authorities. On 2 May 1902, he was arrested for stabbing a man in either a bar fight or a street brawl (sources vary). Reportedly, Sylbaris had become embroiled in a drunken argument over money with a friend and used a machete or cutlass to critically injure the other man in the chest. He was jailed for assault and held at Saint-Pierre Prison.

On the night of 7 May 1902, hours before the eruption, Sylbaris had been placed in solitary confinement to serve eight days as punishment for an escape attempt. He had left prison grounds overnight to attend a celebration in Saint-Pierre and returned the following morning. Despite later assertions that Sylbaris had been awaiting execution by hanging for murder, prison records showed that Sylbaris was due to complete his sentence in a month's time. In his 1977 documentary La Soufrière, German film maker Werner Herzog notes that the miracle of Sylbaris surviving was only "because he was the baddest guy in town", having been put in the lowest underground cell because of his misbehavior, and that 60-70 other prisoners in the jail all died.

Whatever the cause of his arrest, Sylbaris was locked in a single-cell, bomb-proof magazine with stone walls that were built partially underground. The cell, which still stands today, did not have windows and was ventilated only through a narrow grating in the door facing away from the volcano. It was the most sheltered building in the city.

At 7:52 am AST on 8 May, the upper mountainside of Mount Pelée tore open, causing a dense black cloud to shoot out horizontally. A second black cloud rolled upwards as a column of ash and rock, forming a gigantic mushroom plume that darkened the sky within a 50-mile (80 km) radius. The initial speed of both clouds was later calculated at more than 670 km/h (420 mph). The vertical cloud plunged down the western slope of the volcano at 161 km/h (100 mph), and destroyed Saint-Pierre in less than a minute. An area of around 21 km^{2} (8.1 sq mi) was devastated by the pyroclastic flow, with the city of Saint-Pierre taking the full brunt. The cloud consisted of superheated gases and fine debris, with temperatures in excess of 1,000 °C (1,830 °F). All of the city's infrastructure was flattened, and almost the entire population was burned or suffocated.

According to Sylbaris' account, at about breakfast time on the day of the eruption, it grew very dark. Hot air mixed with fine ashes entered his cell through the door grating, despite his efforts to urinate on his clothing and stuff it in the door. The heat lasted only a short moment, enough to cause deep burns on Sylbaris' hands, arms, legs, and back, but his clothes did not ignite, and he avoided breathing the searing hot air. Sylbaris subsisted off of rainwater and condensation that accumulated under the grating of his cell. The only other long-term survivor on the island was Léon Compère-Léandre, although three other residents died of severe burns shortly after rescue. The only other living witnesses to the event, such as foreign sailors moored at the docks or 10-year-old Havivra Da Ifrile, escaped the immediate eruption by boat. Ifrile herself sheltered in a cave on a nearby island until rescued.

On 11 May, Sylbaris was recovered by a rescue party, consisting of Léon Dangis, Georges Hilaire, and Maurice Vidé from neighboring Morne-Rouge, who had heard him screaming from his cell. While Sylbaris received treatment at the local hospital, a second, less severe pyroclastic flow hit the town. He repeated his story to French and American journalists, who expressed doubt, but the Fort-de-France Court of Appeal confirmed that he was jailed the day before the eruption. The explanation for his survival was attested to be plausible by geologist Alfred Lacroix. Local politician and plantation owner Fernand Clerc confirmed that Sylbaris was a long-time resident of Saint Pierre. An article by American journalist George Kennan, as well as the 1902 book Complete Story of the Martinique and St. Vincent Horrors by William Gaersche, named as Raoul Sarteret alias Peleno, made Sylbaris' survival an international headline reprinted in British and Chinese newspapers.

== Later life ==
Sylbaris was pardoned for his crimes, but left entirely destitute due to the destruction of St. Pierre, where he had lived and worked for most of his life. On 24 February 1903, Sylbaris travelled to the United States via the steamship Fontabelle under the name Joseph Sibarace, showing off his injuries and holding interviews in New York City. He later joined Barnum & Bailey's circus, touring America and recounting the horrors of the explosion. He became a minor celebrity in the process, advertised as "the man who lived through Doomsday" or "the Most Marvelous Man in the World". He was the first black man ever to star in Barnum and Bailey's "Greatest Show on Earth", which at the time was a segregated show. He could be seen in a replica of his cell in Saint-Pierre. Sylbaris was called Samson for his height and build, reportedly a nickname he already bore in Martinique, as well as by its corrupted form Sanson, which he sometimes used as a last name as "Louis Sanson".

After several months of touring, Sylbaris was thrown out of the circus for repeatedly fighting with other staff while drunk. He was jailed numerous times in New York for other assault offenses and eventually expelled from the United States. He later moved to Panama, working on the construction of the Panama Canal and lived there until his death of natural causes in 1929, again impoverished and in renewed obscurity. His death was not known for decades in his native Martinique, with the local belief being that Sylbaris became a millionaire and died in Paris in 1955 at the age of 80. It was claimed that his fame had continued and that he wrote a book called "Crime Does Pay" based on his survival of the Mount Pelée disaster, though no book of such title is known to have been published by him.

== In popular culture ==
In her 2024 French novel Ti Fol: Fille du volcan, author Raphaële Frier writes a "unique biography" of Sylbaris woven into a story set in the time of the volcano.
