= Pelle (given name) =

- Pronunciation: Swedish: [ˈpɛ̌lːɛ]
- Gender: Male

Origin
- Origin: Greek
- Meaning: Rock or Stone

Other names
- Related names: Peter, Pete, Petey/Petie, Peoter, Pearce, Petero, Per, Peta, Petra, Pierre, Pedro, Piers

Pelle is a Scandinavian diminutive of the names Per and Peder, variations of the name Peter. It was the No. 351-ranked name in popularity in the Netherlands in 2015.

== Direct translations ==
- Italian: pelle – skin
- French: Pellé – nickname for a bald old man
- Middle Low German: Pelle – precious purple silk cloth
- Finnish: pelle – clown

== Meaning of the name ==
Pelle is a Scandinavian pet form of the name 'Per'. Forms of this name deriving from other languages include 'Petter', 'Peder' and 'Peter'.

Peter is a common masculine given name. It is derived, via Latin petra, from the Greek word πέτρος (petros) meaning 'stone' or 'rock'.

== People named Pelle ==
- Pelle Larsson (born 2001), Swedish basketball player
- Pelle Strindlund (born 1971), Swedish writer and animal rights advocate
- Howlin Pelle Almqvist (born 1978), Swedish singer, frontman of The Hives
- Pelle Ohlin (born 1969), Swedish singer, temporary frontman of Mayhem

== Fictional characters ==
- Pelle, the main antagonist of the 2019 folk horror movie Midsommar
- Pelle the Conqueror, the main character in a Danish book and film
- Pelle Svanslös, a popular Swedish children's story character

== See also ==
- Pele (name), given name and surname
