= Léon Compère-Léandre =

Martiniquais shoemaker

Léon Compère-Léandre (c.1874–1936) was a Martiniquais shoemaker in Saint-Pierre on the French Caribbean island of Martinique when Mount Pelée erupted on 8 May 1902, and destroyed the town. He was one of only two (arguably three) known survivors.

== Background ==
Compère-Léandre, of Afro-Caribbean descent and aged around 28 at the time of the eruption, resided on Trace Road in the eastern part of Saint-Pierre, sharing a house with the Delvaud family.

== Mount Pelée eruption ==
On the morning of 8 May 1902, Compère-Léandre was sitting on his doorstep, watching ships in the distance. As it was the Feast of the Ascension, he was not at work in the inner town.

I felt a terrible wind blowing, the earth began to tremble, and the sky suddenly became dark. I turned to go into the house, with great difficulty climbed the three or four steps that separated me from my room, and felt my arms and legs burning, also my body. I dropped upon a table. At this moment four others sought refuge in my room, crying and writhing with pain, although their garments showed no sign of having been touched by flame. At the end of 10 minutes one of these, the young Delavaud girl, aged about 10 years, fell dead; the others left. I got up and went to another room, where I found the father Delavaud, still clothed and lying on the bed, dead. He was purple and inflated, but the clothing was intact. Crazed and almost overcome, I threw myself on a bed, inert and awaiting death. My senses returned to me in perhaps an hour, when I beheld the roof burning. With sufficient strength left, my legs bleeding and covered with burns, I ran to Fonds-Saint-Denis, six kilometres from St. Pierre.

Little is known of Léon Compère-Léandre, since he retreated completely from the public after the disaster.

Rescuers found him and sent him to the town of Fort-de-France, where he was labeled as a madman. Shortly thereafter, he was deputized by the police, given a gun and sent to protect the ruins from looters. After a week of duty, he left the city on 20 May 1902, and started back towards Fort-de-France. He barely escaped a second death cloud. He eventually settled in the village of Morne Rouge, only to have another cloud pour through on August 30, 1902. He was again one of the few who survived. He lived on the island until his death in 1936 from a fall.

The most scientifically viable theory is that Leon jumped into the ocean when the flow hit and survived despite the water's boiling temperature. Other accounts suggest that he survived by "napping in [his] wood cellar" or managed to outrun the pyroclastic flow (the latter being highly unlikely).

The other two survivors were Louis-Auguste Cyparis, a jailed prisoner who was pardoned and later joined P. T. Barnum's circus, and Havivra Da Ifrile, a little girl.
