= Peleus (disambiguation) =

Peleus is a hero in Greek mythology.

Peleus may also refer to:

- In-Q-Tel, formerly Peleus, American not-for-profit venture capital firm
- Mount Peleus, mount in Victoria Land, Antarctica
- Saint Peleus, Christian martyr
- SS Peleus, Greek ship
- Peleus, a synonym for Entheus, a genus of butterflies

== See also ==
- Pele (disambiguation)
- Pelee (disambiguation)
