= Petter (surname) =

Petter is the surname of:

- Anton Petter (1781–1858), Austrian painter
- Charles Petter (1880–1953), Swiss firearms designer
- Ernest Petter (1873–1954), English industrialist and unsuccessful politician
- Isabelle Petter (born 2000), English field hockey player
- Kurt Petter (1909–1969), German Nazi physician, deputy leader of the Hitler Youth and educational administrator
- W. E. W. Petter (1908–1968), English aircraft designer
- Willy Petter, Austrian pairs figure skater in the early 1930s

== See also ==
- Steven De Petter (born 1985), Belgian retired footballer
- Petters, another surname
