= Petter =

Petter may refer to:

== People ==
- Petter (given name)
- Petter (surname)
- Petter (rapper), stage name of Swedish rapper Petter Alexis Askergren (born 1974)

== Other uses ==
- Petter Bay, a bay on Coronation Island, in the South Orkney Islands, in Scotland

== See also ==
- Petters (disambiguation)
