= Pelee =

Pelee may refer to:

- Pelee, Ontario, an island in Lake Erie, Canada
- Point Pelee National Park, a park in Ontario, Canada
- Mount Pelée, a volcano in Martinique
- Peleus, who may be referred to as "Pélée" in French, father of Achilles

== See also ==
- Pele (disambiguation)
