= Le Morne-Rouge =

- Commune
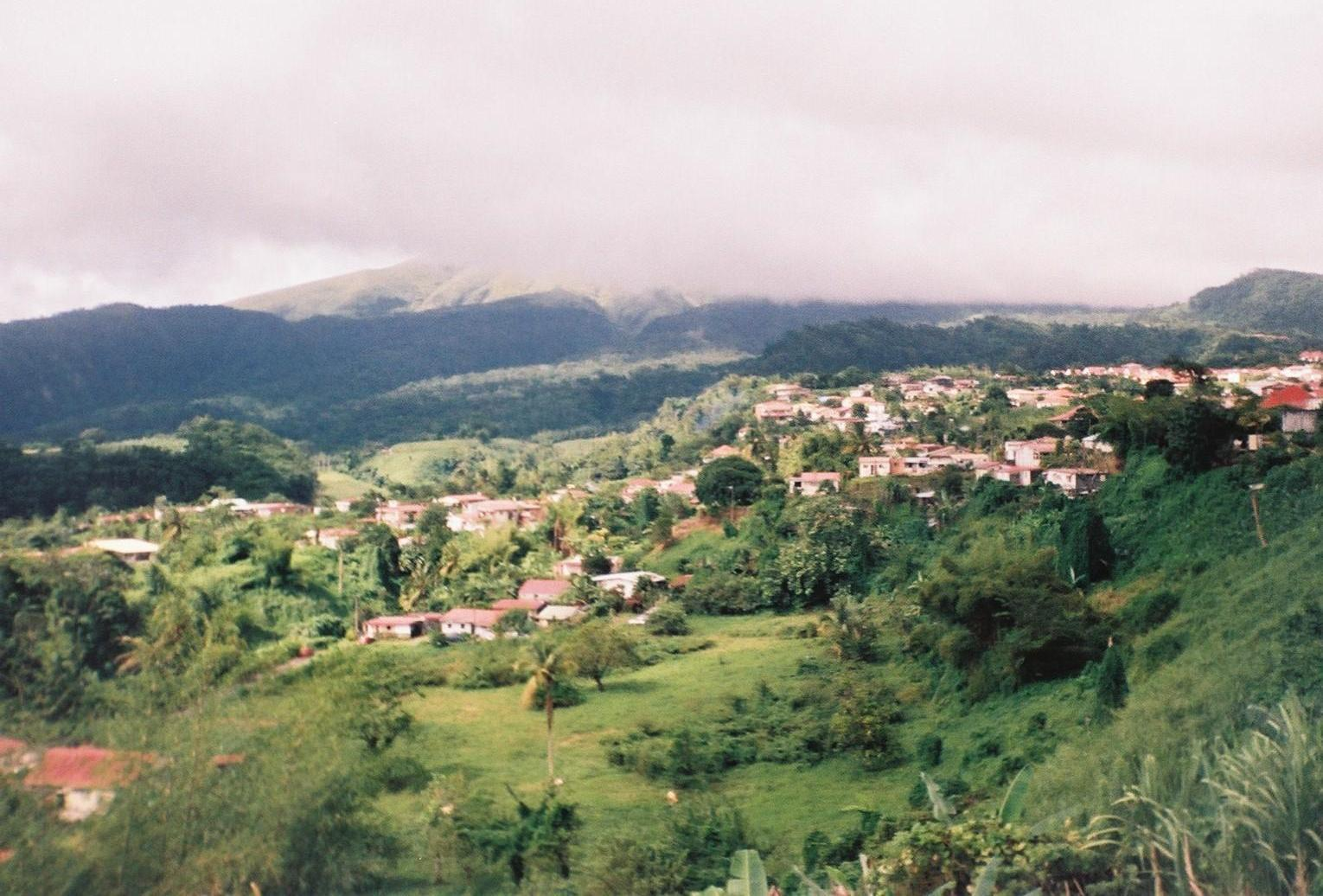
- View over Morne-Rouge in the direction of the cloud-hidden Mount Pelée

- Coat of arms

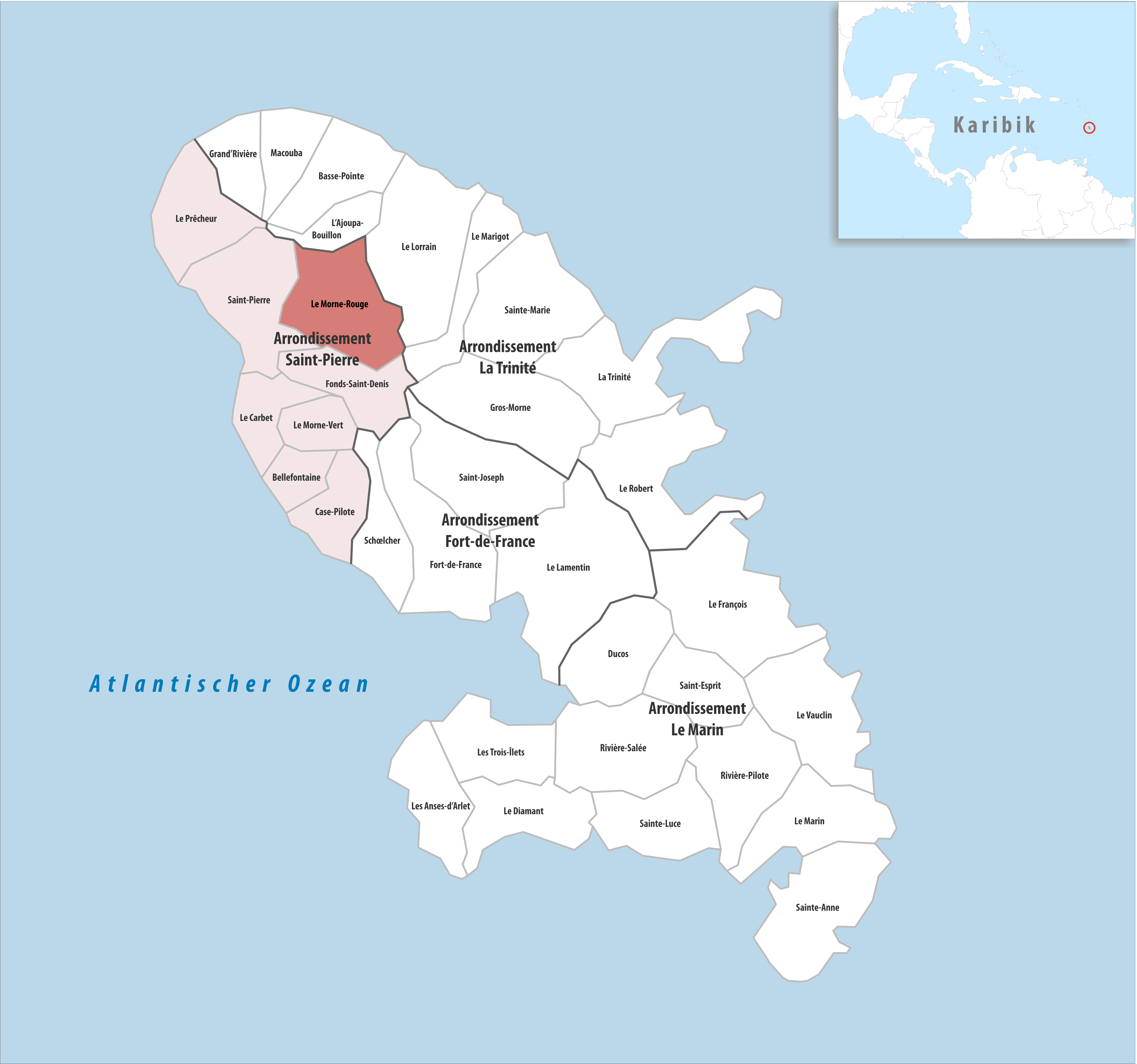
- Location of the commune (in red) within Martinique
- Location of Le Morne-Rouge
- Coordinates: 14°46′25″N 61°08′05″W
- Country: France
- Overseas region and department: Martinique
- Arrondissement: Saint-Pierre
- Intercommunality: CA Pays Nord Martinique

Government
  - Mayor (2020–2026): Jenny Dulys-Petit
- Area^{1}: 37.64 km^{2} (14.53 sq mi)
- Highest elevation: 923 m (3,028 ft)
- Lowest elevation: 120 m (390 ft)
- Population (2023): 4,388
  - Density: 116.6/km^{2} (301.9/sq mi)
- Demonym: Péléen·ne
- Time zone: UTC−04:00 (AST)
- INSEE/Postal code: 97218 /97260
- ^{1} French Land Register data, which excludes lakes, ponds, glaciers > 1 km^{2} (0.386 sq mi or 247 acres) and river estuaries.

Le Morne-Rouge (French pronunciation: [lə mɔʁn ʁuʒ]; Martinican Creole: Mònwouj) is a commune and town in the French overseas department and island of Martinique.

== Geography ==
Le Morne-Rouge is the wettest town of Martinique, It is situated on a plateau between Mount Pelée and the massive of the Carbet Mountains.

=== Climate ===
Le Morne-Rouge has a tropical rainforest climate (Köppen climate classification Af). The average annual temperature in Le Morne-Rouge is 24.3 °C (75.7 °F). The average annual rainfall is 4,683.0 mm (184.37 in) with November as the wettest month. The temperatures are highest on average in August, at around 25.5 °C (77.9 °F), and lowest in February, at around 22.7 °C (72.9 °F). The highest temperature ever recorded in Le Morne-Rouge was 33.1 °C (91.6 °F) on 13 September 2019; the coldest temperature ever recorded was 12.1 °C (53.8 °F) in December 2022.

Climate data for Le Morne-Rouge (1991−2020 normals, extremes 1965−present)
Month	Jan	Feb	Mar	Apr	May	Jun	Jul	Aug	Sep	Oct	Nov	Dec	Year
Record high °C (°F)	29.0 (84.2)	30.6 (87.1)	30.3 (86.5)	31.1 (88.0)	31.5 (88.7)	31.9 (89.4)	31.0 (87.8)	32.0 (89.6)	33.1 (91.6)	32.0 (89.6)	32.0 (89.6)	29.7 (85.5)	33.1 (91.6)
Mean daily maximum °C (°F)	25.6 (78.1)	25.6 (78.1)	26.0 (78.8)	26.8 (80.2)	27.5 (81.5)	27.4 (81.3)	27.6 (81.7)	28.3 (82.9)	28.9 (84.0)	28.3 (82.9)	27.3 (81.1)	26.3 (79.3)	27.1 (80.8)
Daily mean °C (°F)	22.9 (73.2)	22.7 (72.9)	23.1 (73.6)	23.8 (74.8)	24.7 (76.5)	25.0 (77.0)	25.2 (77.4)	25.5 (77.9)	25.4 (77.7)	25.1 (77.2)	24.4 (75.9)	23.5 (74.3)	24.3 (75.7)
Mean daily minimum °C (°F)	20.1 (68.2)	19.8 (67.6)	20.0 (68.0)	20.8 (69.4)	22.0 (71.6)	22.7 (72.9)	22.7 (72.9)	22.6 (72.7)	22.0 (71.6)	21.9 (71.4)	21.4 (70.5)	20.7 (69.3)	21.4 (70.5)
Record low °C (°F)	12.6 (54.7)	12.9 (55.2)	12.7 (54.9)	13.0 (55.4)	15.4 (59.7)	18.0 (64.4)	17.9 (64.2)	17.4 (63.3)	16.0 (60.8)	15.3 (59.5)	15.0 (59.0)	12.1 (53.8)	12.1 (53.8)
Average precipitation mm (inches)	379.5 (14.94)	255.2 (10.05)	263.1 (10.36)	312.1 (12.29)	333.5 (13.13)	355.5 (14.00)	465.4 (18.32)	466.8 (18.38)	433.8 (17.08)	448.0 (17.64)	532.1 (20.95)	438.0 (17.24)	4,683 (184.37)
Average precipitation days (≥ 1.0 mm)	26.2	22.1	22.1	20.4	21.3	23.9	27.3	26.8	23.0	24.5	25.6	25.0	288.1
Source: Météo-France

== History ==
In 1763, Acadians who had been expelled from modern-day Nova Scotia and New Brunswick during le Grand Dérangement landed at Le Morne-Rouge. In 1765, their colony, called Champflore, had roughly 400 residents, 100 of them Acadians who had previously been exiled to New York, the remainder from Germany and Alsace. Seventy-eight Acadians remained in 1767, and most or all had left Martinique for Quebec or Louisiana by 1800.

The commune was founded in 1888, following the division of Saint-Pierre.

== Population ==
Historical population
Year	Pop.	±% p.a.
1967	5,449	—
1974	5,412	−0.10%
1982	4,889	−1.26%
1990	5,278	+0.96%
1999	5,395	+0.24%
2007	5,170	−0.53%
2012	5,003	−0.65%
2017	5,114	+0.44%
2023	4,388	−2.52%
Source: INSEE

== See also ==
- Communes of Martinique
