= Louis Mouttet =

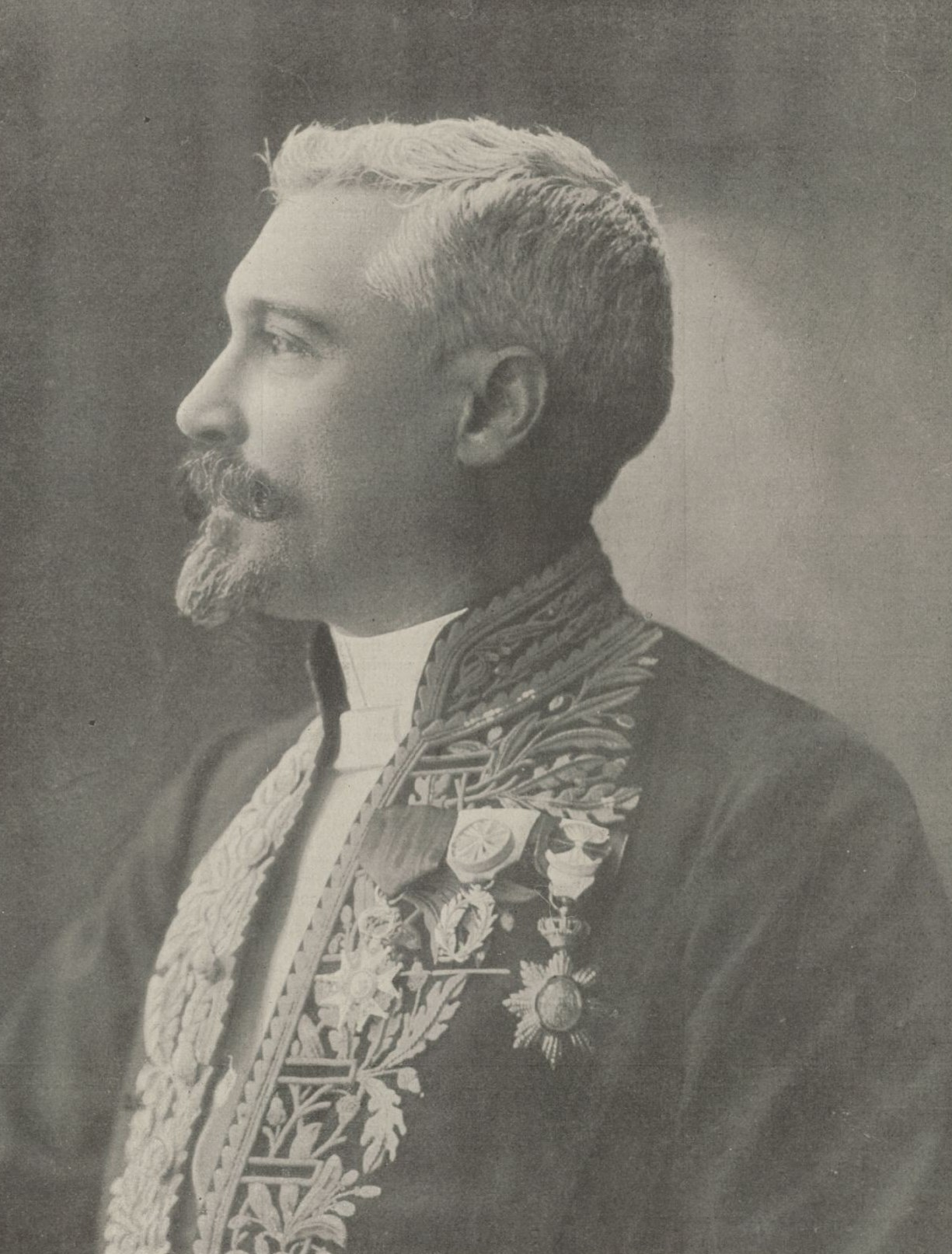
Louis Guillaume Mouttet

Louis Guillaume Mouttet (10 October 1857 – 8 May 1902) was a French colonial official who served as Governor of Côte d'Ivoire in 1898 and Governor of French Guiana from 1898 till 1901. Appointed Governor of Martinique in 1901, he was killed along with his wife in the eruption of Mount Pelee on 8 May 1902, which completely destroyed the city of St. Pierre.

== Origins and early colonial career ==
Born into a French Huguenot farming family of modest origins in Marseille, Mouttet espoused extremely radical socialist views in his early years. His parents were Jean Louis Victor Mouttet (†1884) and Augustine Rosalie (née Chandellier) (†1881).

Classified as an extreme leftist, he contributed articles to the Socialist Review and rubbed shoulders with Benoît Malon. He studied law in Paris, and worked briefly as a sub-editor on the staff of La Patrie before becoming secretary of the Historical Society of Paris.

In 1886, Mouttet joined the French Colonial Service with the support of Félix Faure and was sent to Senegal in May 1887 as a deputy bureau chief, second class. Owing to his initiative and abilities, he quickly gained promotion to Secretary of the Interior for the colony. He was transferred to French Indochina in May 1889 as chief of staff to the Governor-General, Jules Picquet. The following year, he married Marie de Coppet (1867–1902), the niece of the deputy of Le Havre, and was appointed a Chevalier of the Légion d'honneur that September. In 1892, he was appointed minister of internal affairs for Guadeloupe and appointed to the same position in Senegal in 1894. Becoming acting Governor of Senegal in 1895, he oversaw the amalgamation of Senegal, French Sudan, Guinea and the Ivory Coast into the union of French West Africa.

Mouttet was promoted acting governor of Ivory Coast in 1896 and promoted to governor, fourth class (roughly equivalent to the British commissioner) of Cote d'Ivoire in 1897. During his brief tenure, he organized the local educational authority for the colony. Highly rated by his superiors, he received a promotion to governor, third class (roughly equivalent to chief commissioner) of French Guiana in late 1898. Although he disliked the climate and poor infrastructure of the penal colony, his tenure there was noteworthy in itself, as he supervised the release of Captain Alfred Dreyfus, implicated for treason in the controversial Dreyfus Affair. Owing in part to his actions in the case, Mouttet was appointed governor, second class (lieutenant-governor) of Martinique in October 1900. Since his assignment to Guadeloupe in 1892, Mouttet and his family had long held an affection for the Caribbean, and Mouttet saw his new appointment as the culmination of a distinguished civil service career.

== Personal life ==
Mouttet married Marie Henriette Hélène de Coppet (born 27 January 1867), a minister's daughter, on 27 September 1897, in Étretat, Normandy. They went on to have three children, daughters Lucie Alice on 19 November 1891 and Hélène Renée Louise on 5 October 1895, and son Jacques Louis Jean Henri on 9 June 1901.

== Prelude to disaster ==
After taking up his appointment in June 1901 and settling with his family in Fort-de-France, Mouttet was immediately caught up in the turmoil of local politics. Although the white colonial oligarchy had managed to retain their economic power after the abolition of slavery in 1848 and the subsequent extension of voting rights to all French citizens in 1871, tensions between them and the middle-class coloured bourgeoisie yet remained. An election to the French Chamber of Deputies was due to be held on 11 May, and the campaigning leading up to the election demanded much of the new governor's attention. However, awareness of a more serious problem was slowly beginning to arise.

The 2,500-foot volcanic peak of Mount Pelee had dominated the north island of Martinique for thousands of years. Although the early colonists were made aware that it was a volcano, previous eruptions in 1792 and 1851 had been minor. However, in 1900 and 1901, sulphurous fumes were observed issuing from vents near the mountain. In early 1902, the volcano reawakened, sending plumes of smoke and steam into the skies. Earth tremors began in February, becoming more frequent over the next two months. In April, hosts of insects, snakes and rodents left the slopes of the rumbling volcano, causing a nuisance in the villages below. Dogs barked continually; cattle became skittish. On 23 April, Mount Pelee sent up great clouds of dark ash and smoke, causing the ground to rumble for miles. Ash began to fall in St. Pierre and its environs. Tremendous detonations began on 24 April.

On 5 May, a lahar broke loose, destroying a rum refinery and killing some 150 people. Already, hundreds of residents in the area had abandoned their homes, taking refuge in St. Pierre. The previous day, Mouttet, watching the eruption from Fort-de-France, had decided to appoint a commission to discuss whether or not it was advisable to evacuate St. Pierre. As volcanology and seismology were still in their infancy in 1902, he felt it advisable to get other opinions. As well, evacuating nearly 30,000 people was not a simple task.

On 7 May, Mouttet handed over his authority to Georges L'Heurre, secretary-general of the colony and acting governor in the governor's absence. He expected to be gone for but a few days. Around 4 p.m. he and his wife kissed their three children good-bye, leaving them in the care of their nurses, and boarded the SS Topaze for St. Pierre.

Upon their arrival in St. Pierre, around 5 that afternoon, Marie settled into their suite at the Hotel Intendance, while Mouttet met the members of the scientific commission in the hotel dining room. Apart from Mouttet himself, the commission included Gaston Landes and Eugene Doze, professors of natural science at the local Lycée (high school), Lieutenant-Colonel Jules Gerbault of the artillery and William Leonce, a civil engineer of St. Pierre. Paul Mirville, chief chemist and pharmacist for the colonial garrison in Fort-de-France, was also a member of the commission; however, he did not attend the meeting. After deliberating for some time, the commission decided that any danger from Mount Pelee was negligible.

== Catastrophe ==
At 7:15 the following morning, 8 May, Ascension Day, Mouttet boarded a steam launch along with three other members of his commission, excepting Gaston Landes. He set off at 7:40 for Precheur, a small town a mile south of St. Pierre, where he and the other members of the commission would decide if it needed to be evacuated. Around the same time, witnesses observed a strange hiccuping sound from the volcano and a drifting cloud of ash; one observer noted that the summit of the volcano was glowing bright red.

At 8:02, Mount Pelee exploded. Two simultaneous eruptions issued from the volcano; a cloud of ash and steam billowed seven miles (11 km) into the sky. At the same instant, a tremendous pyroclastic surge exploded down the southwestern flanks of the mountain, obliterating two villages in its path, but just missing Precheur. At a speed of 120 miles per hour (190 km/h) and at temperatures of 700 F (370 °C - according to other sources the temperature exceeded 1,075 °C), the surge struck St. Pierre with devastating force. All buildings in its path, as well as the city walls, were instantly demolished. In an instant, some 30,000 people were crushed, burned or asphyxiated to death by the superheated clouds of gases and steam. Gaston Landes, who had remained at his home just outside the surge cloud, was badly burnt and died a few hours later. The cloud spread through the ruins of the city for three minutes, engulfing it in a sea of fire. The cloud then struck the waterfront with terrific force, setting several ships afire.

== Legacy ==
Mouttet's legacy suffered after the disaster. Many blamed him for his poor handling of the situation. Some historians have criticised his refusal to evacuate the city in order not to alarm public opinion or give arguments to the local opposition, who were calling for urgent measures.
