= Pelé (surname) =

Pelé is a French surname. Notable people with the surname include:

- Abédi Pelé (born Abédi Ayew in 1964), Ghanaian footballer
- Bryan Pelé (born 1992), French footballer
- Léo Pelé (born 1996), Brazilian footballer
- Marcelo Pelé, Brazilian footballer
- Maurice Pelé (1928–2021), French cyclist
- Roger Pelé (1901–1982), French long-distance runner
- Steven Pelé (born 1981), French football goalkeeper
- Yohann Pelé (born 1982), French football goalkeeper

== See also ==
- Pele (surname)
- Graziano Pellè (born 1985), Italian footballer
