= Carbet Mountains =

Massif on the Caribbean island of Martinique

Coordinates: 14.6982°N 61.1138°W

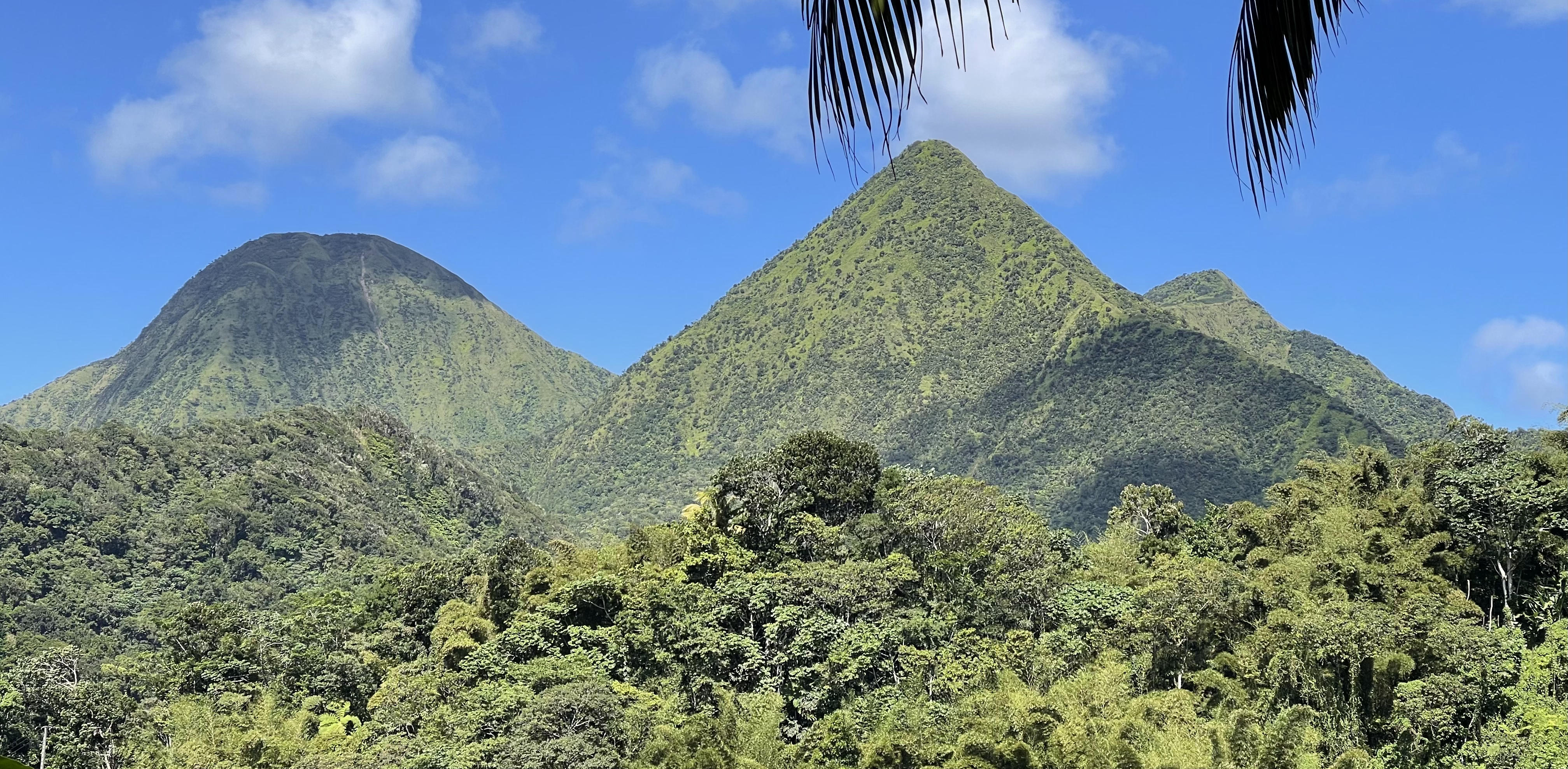
- Pitons de Carbet as seen from the Route de la trace linking Fort de France to Morne Rouge. From right to left: Piton Lacroix, Piton Dumauzé and Piton de l'Alma.

Highest point
- Elevation: 1,197 m (3,927 ft)

Geography
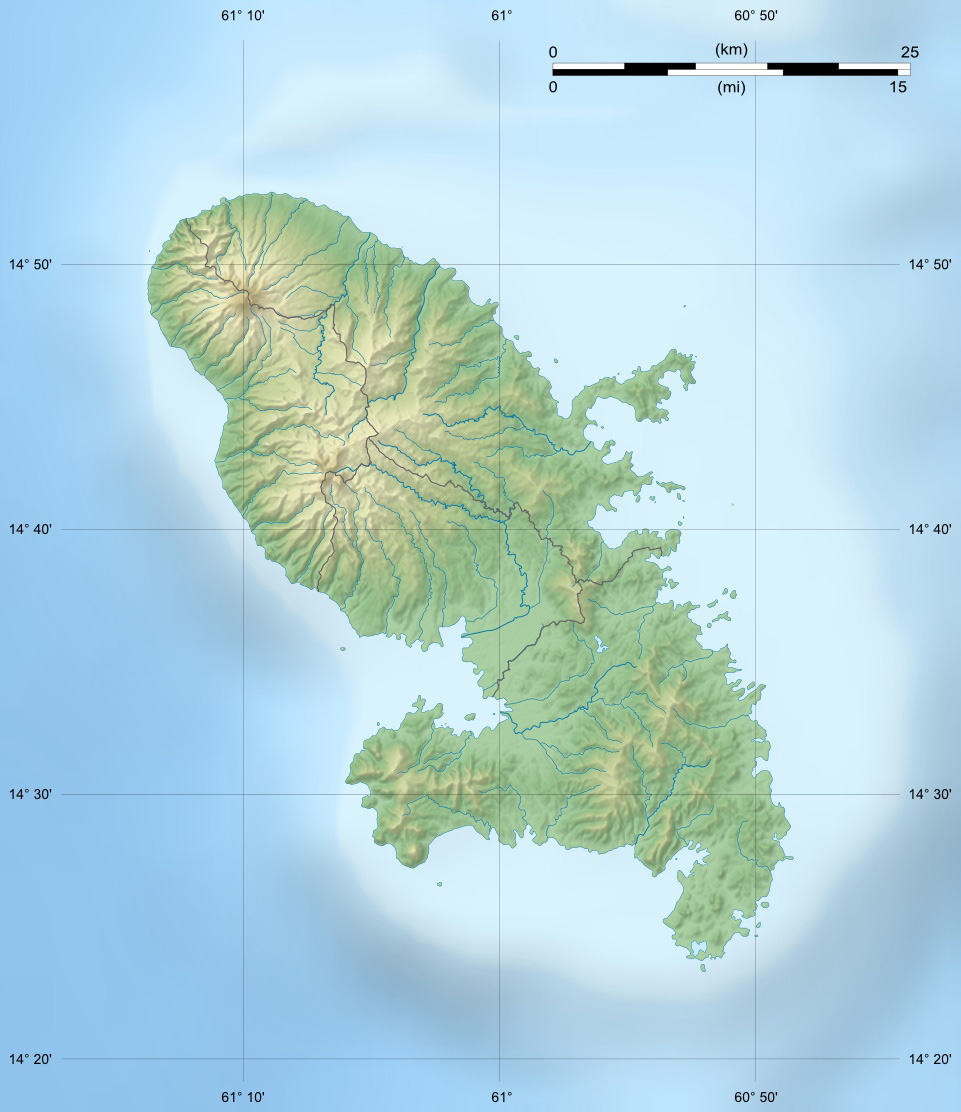
- Location within Martinique
- Location: Martinique

UNESCO World Heritage Site
- Part of: Volcanoes and Forests of Mount Pelée and the Pitons of Northern Martinique
- Criteria: Natural: viii, x
- Reference: 1657-002
- Inscription: 2023 (45th Session)

The Carbet Mountains (French: Pitons Du Carbet, or Carbet Nails) are a massif of volcanic origin on the Caribbean island of Martinique.

The mountain range is a popular tourist, hiking, and rock climbing destination.

== Geography ==
The scenic Carbet Pitons range occupy an 8 km long area of outstanding natural beauty through the centre of the island, and include some of its highest peaks, though Martinique's highest point Mount Pelée is not part of the range. The singularly steep peaks of the Carbet Pitons range, a defining landmark of Northern Martinique's landscapes, form a series of volcanic andesite domes and peaks covered with thick, pristine rainforests towering above the bay and city of Fort de France.

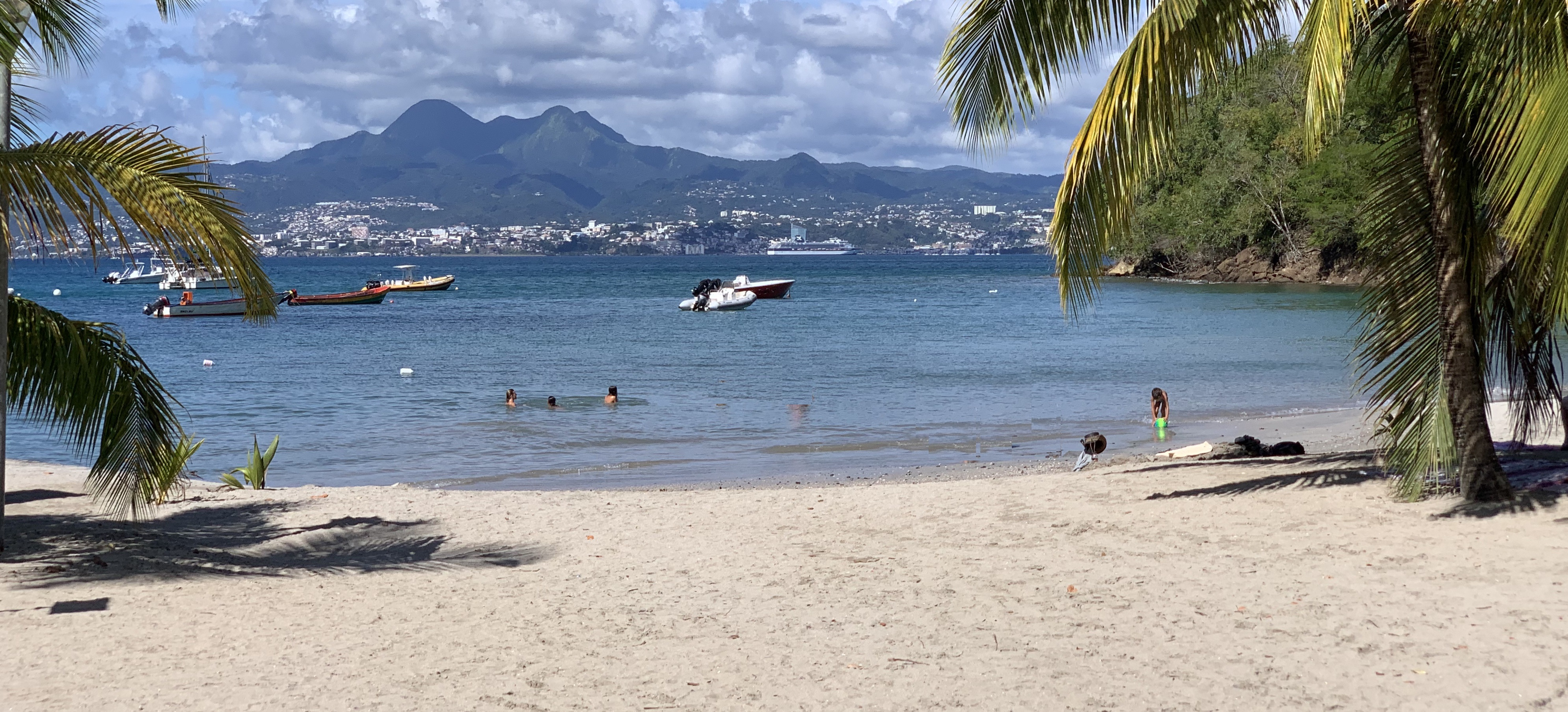
The Pitons du Carbet range and rainforests towering above the capital Fort de France and its bay, as seen from Anse à l'Ane beach in Trois-Ilets.

Despite appearing as distincts mountains, these volcanic dykes are actually various lava domes of a single volcano. They were erected in various eruptions as a result of the collapse of the caldeira of the former Pitons du Carbet paleovolcano, which developed 10 kilometers to the southwest of the older shield volcano of Morne Jacob. The rock contains crystals of quartz, biotite, amphibole and plagioclase. The deposits of ash and boulders at the foot of the peaks show that their emplacement was not smooth and that they or parts of them have collapsed several times in their history. According to the most recent datings, the peaks are between one million and 322,000 years old, which is relatively young on the geological time scale. They are, however, older than Mount Pelee further north.

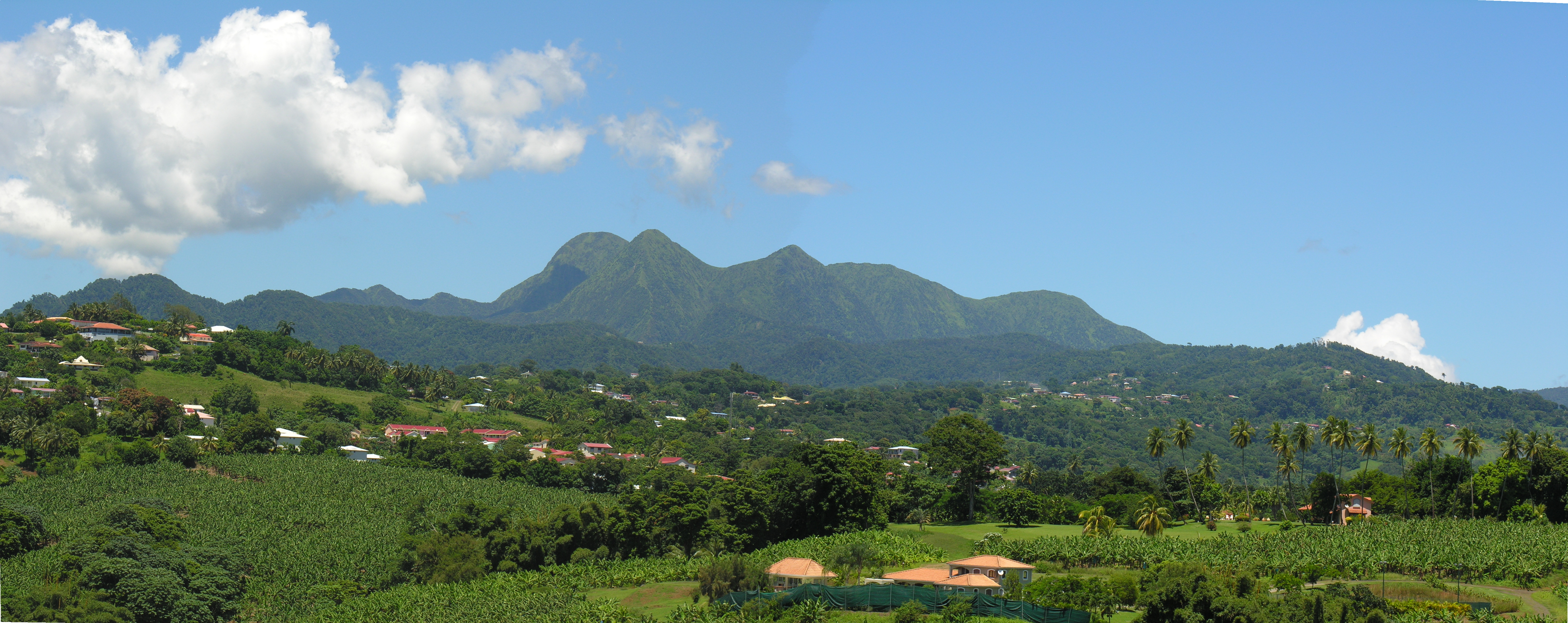
The Pitons du Carbet range, as seen from Gros Morne.

The various peaks are grouped together in a fairly small area. The highest peak is Piton Lacroix, which peaks at 1,197 m. Other important peaks are the ridge of Morne Piquet (1,160 m, to the north), the Dumauzé peak (1,112 m) and the Alma peak (1,107 m). The ascent of these peaks is possible but should be reserved for the highly trained hikers due to the very steep slopes and trails made slippery by the extreme humidity of the climate (trails eastward from Morne-Vert on the Caribbean coast or westward from the abandoned thermal station of Absalon or Plateau Boucher near the Route de la Trace in the deeply forested central north of the island).

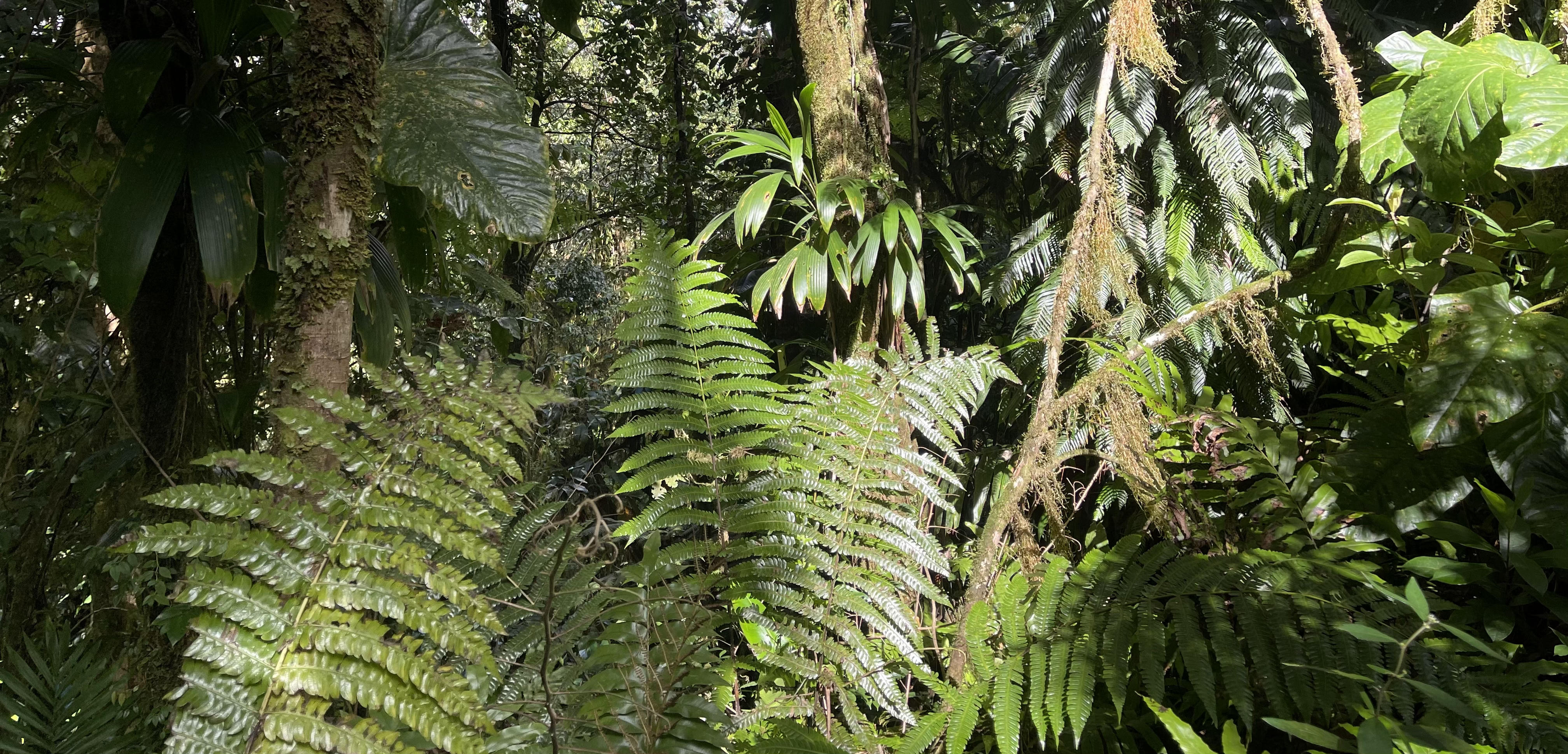
Thick, pristine rainforest covering the lower slopes of the Pitons du Carbet range

The Pitons du Carbet's primeval forest natural reserve, which has been granted by the French Government, together with a dozen of other forests nationwide, the label of "Forêt d'Exception", is a hotspot of biodiversity. It's primeval rainforest include very diverse and complex fauna and entomofauna (including the West Indian Opossum (Didelphis marsupialis), the most feared Spearhead snake (Bothrops Lanceolatus), the Martinique Northern Tarentula (Caribena Versicolor) and rare or endemic species of hummingbirds such as the Blue headed hummingbird, the green throated carib, the purple throated carib or the Antillean crested Hummingbirds), as well as exceptionally rich and precious flora and plant organisations (some of which are virgin, primary forest free of any past human modifications).

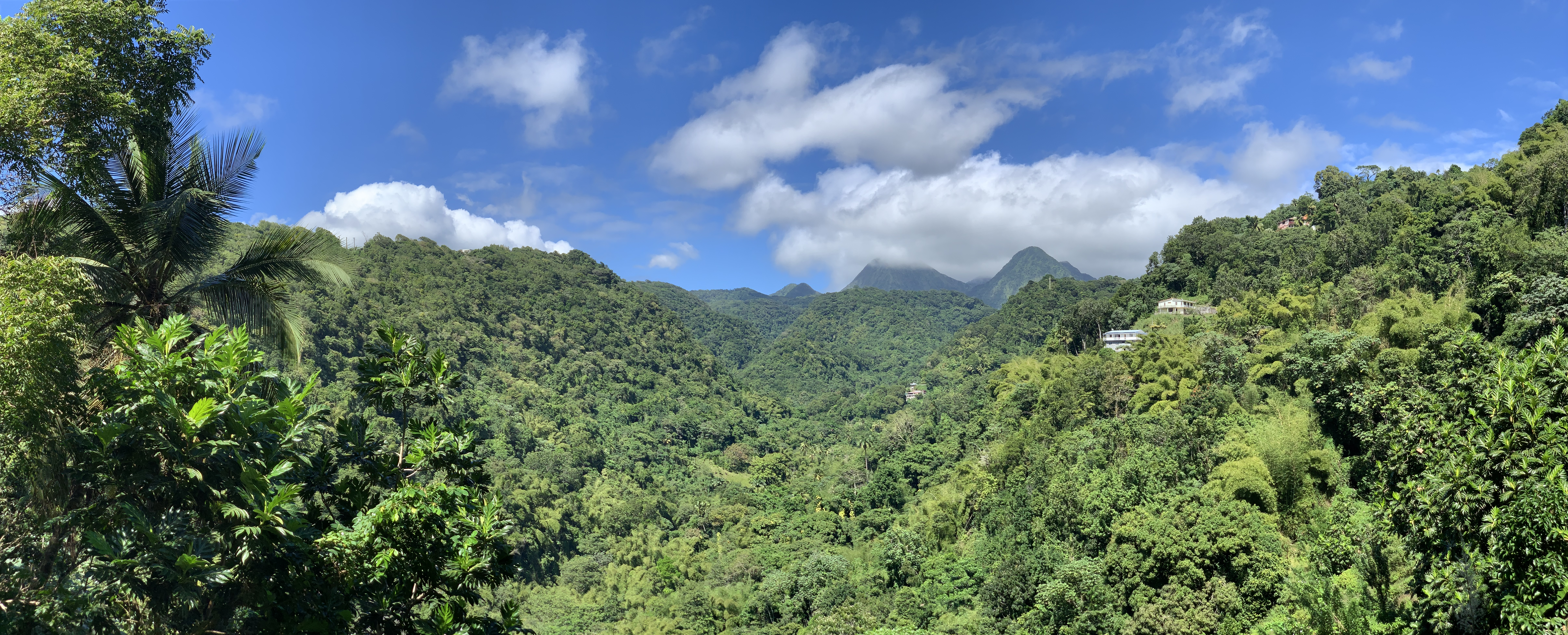
Pitons du Carbet rainforest, as seen from Fontaine Didier in Fort de France

At its lowest altitudes and downwind, the zone presents submontane rainforest formations, replaced at higher altitudes by the topographic facies of the tropical mountain rainforest. This is mainly located on narrow, steeply sloping interfluves, but also in less steep areas of the slopes. In addition, at the highest altitudes, the cloud forest is densely populated with endemic species including bryophytes, Praestoea montana and/or tree ferns. To the summits or in very exposed areas, dense thickets are very diverse and rich in endemic species. These summit areas boast almost pure populations of rare orchids such as Bracchionidium sherringii). Finally, the most unstable terrains show a high level of herbaceous formations also containing rare or endemic species such as the small fern Odontosoria flexuosa, endemic to the Lesser Antilles and victim of erosion of the tracks.

=== Peaks ===
The five highest mountain peaks of the Carbet range and their heights are:

- Piton Lacroix or Morne Pavillon (1197 m)
- Morne Piquet (1160 m)
- Piton Dumauzé (1109 m)
- Piton de l'Alma (1105 m)
- Piton Boucher (1070 m)

== Protection ==
On September 16, 2023, the Carbet Mountain and the volcanoes and forests of Mount Pelée were inscribed on UNESCO World Heritage List. It is the 7th natural site in France to be listed as a UNESCO World Heritage site.
