= Pele (Cos) =

Coordinates: 36°50′24″N 27°08′33″E

Pele (Ancient Greek: Πήλη) was a town of ancient Greece on the island of Cos.

Its site is located near modern Pili.
