= Lesser Antilles Volcanic Arc =

Volcanic arc that forms the eastern boundary of the Caribbean Plate

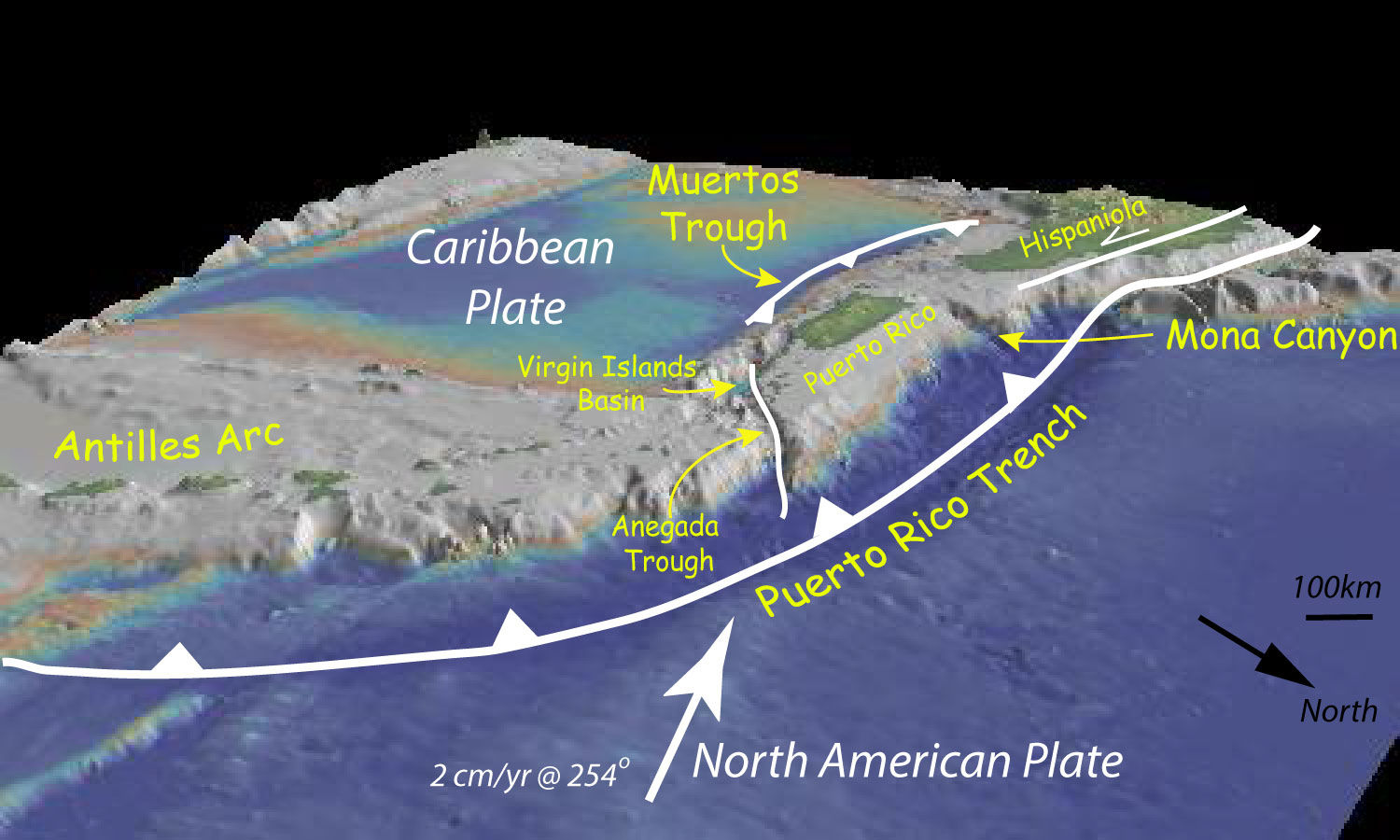
Bathymetry of the northeast corner of the Caribbean Plate showing the major faults and plate boundaries; view looking south-west. The main bathymetric features of this area include: the Lesser Antilles volcanic arc; the old inactive volcanic arc of the Greater Antilles (Virgin Islands, Puerto Rico, and Hispaniola); the Muertos Trough; and the Puerto Rico Trench formed at the plate boundary zone between the Caribbean and obliquely subducting North American Plates. Vertical exaggeration is 5:1.

The Lesser Antilles Volcanic Arc is a volcanic arc that forms the eastern boundary of the Caribbean Plate. It is part of a subduction zone, also known as the Lesser Antilles subduction zone, where the oceanic crust of the North American Plate is being subducted under the Caribbean Plate. This subduction process formed a number of volcanic islands, from the Virgin Islands in the north to the islands off the coast of Venezuela in the south. The Lesser Antilles Volcanic Arc includes 21 'active' volcanoes, notably Soufriere Hills on Montserrat; Mount Pelée on Martinique; La Grande Soufrière on Guadeloupe; Soufrière Saint Vincent on Saint Vincent; Mount Scenery on Saba; and the submarine volcano Kick 'em Jenny which lies about 10 kilometres (5.4 nmi) north of Grenada.
