= Maurice Pelé =

French cyclist (1928–2021)

Personal information
- Born: 8 December 1928 Saint-Julien-de-Vouvantes, France
- Died: 20 February 2021 (aged 92) Nantes, France

Cycling career
- Sport: Cycling

Amateur teams
- 1947–1950: VS Mésanger
- 1951–1964: Pédale Nantaise

Professional teams
- 1954: Gitane-Hutchinson
- 1955: Gitane-J. Robic-Hutchinson
- 1956: Arrow-Hutchinson
- 1957–1958: Individual
- 1959: UNCP
- 1960–1962: Individual

Maurice Pelé (8 December 1928 – 20 February 2021) was a French cyclist.

== Biography ==
Throughout his career, Pelé was a member of the teams Vélo Sport Mésanger and Pédale Nantaise. In 1953, he won the Grand Prix de l'Équipe et du CV 19e, the former version of the Paris–Tours Espoirs. His professional career lasted from 1954 to 1962. The winner of the Bordeaux-Saintes, he retired from cycling in 1964. His son, Maurice Pelé Jr., was also a cyclist.

Maurice Pelé died in Nantes on 20 February 2021 at the age of 92.
