= Pele (surname) =

Pele is a surname. Notable people with the surname include:

- Abedi Pele (born 1964), Ghanaian footballer
- Abuga Pele (born 1958), Ghanaian politician
- Eric Pele (born 1969), American mixed martial artist
- Franklin Pele (born 2000), New Zealand rugby player

== See also ==
- Pelé (surname)
