= Petters =

Petters may refer to:

- Arlie Petters (born 1964), Belizean-American mathematical physicist
- Tom Petters (born 1957), former CEO and chairman of Petters Group Worldwide, convicted for perpetrating a Ponzi scheme
- Petters Limited, a former manufacturer of internal combustion engines
- Petters Group Worldwide, a diversified company headquartered in Minnetonka, Minnesota

== See also ==
- Petter (disambiguation)
