= Pele (Thessaly) =

Pele (Ancient Greek: Πέλη) was a town in ancient Thessaly. It is unlocated.
