= Mount Pelée =

Active volcano on the Caribbean island of Martinique

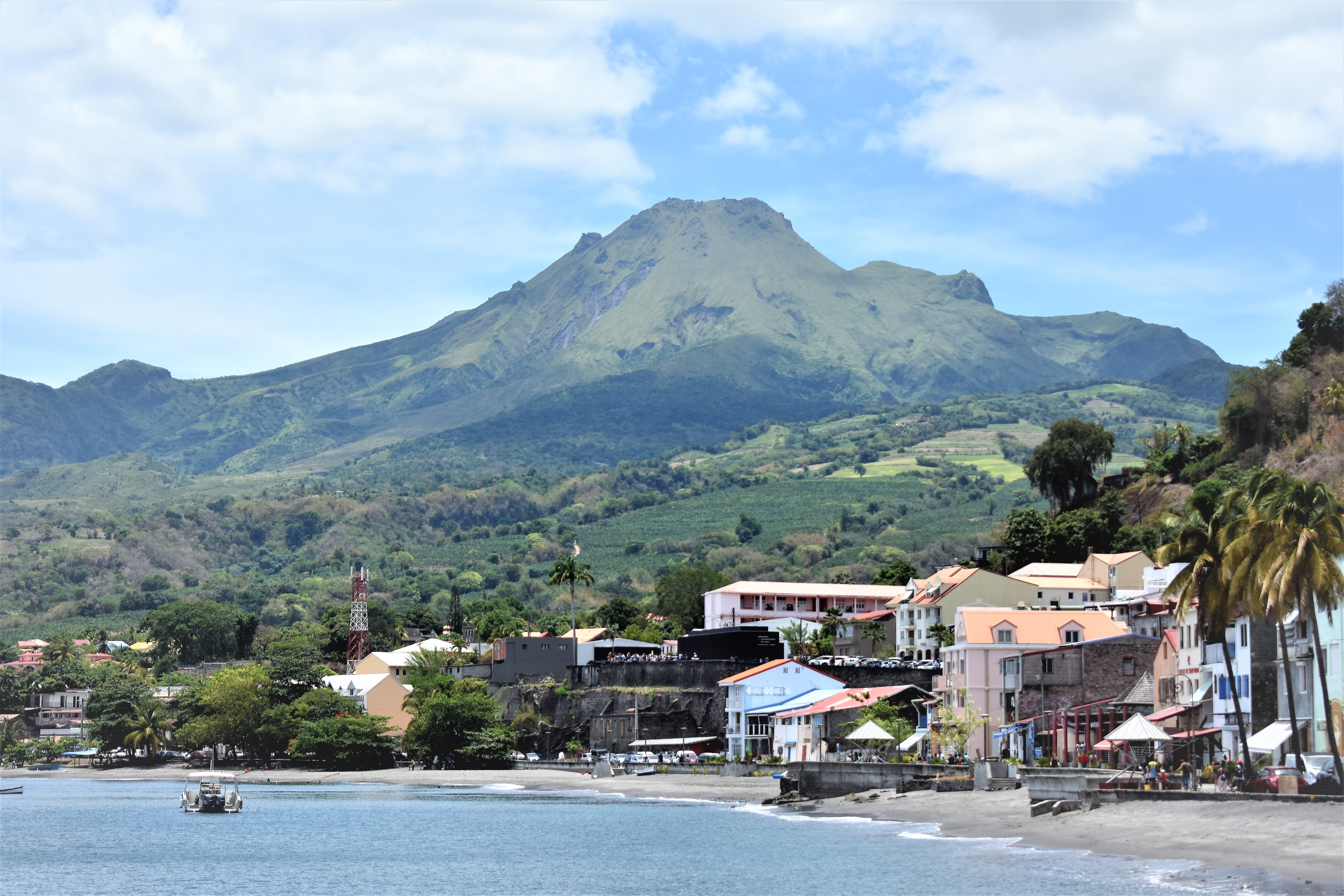

Highest point
- Elevation: 1,397 m (4,583 ft)
- Prominence: 1,395 m (4,577 ft)
- Listing: Ribu
- Coordinates: 14°49′N 61°10′W

Naming
- Pronunciation: English: /pəˈleɪ/ pə-LAY; French: [pəle]

Geography
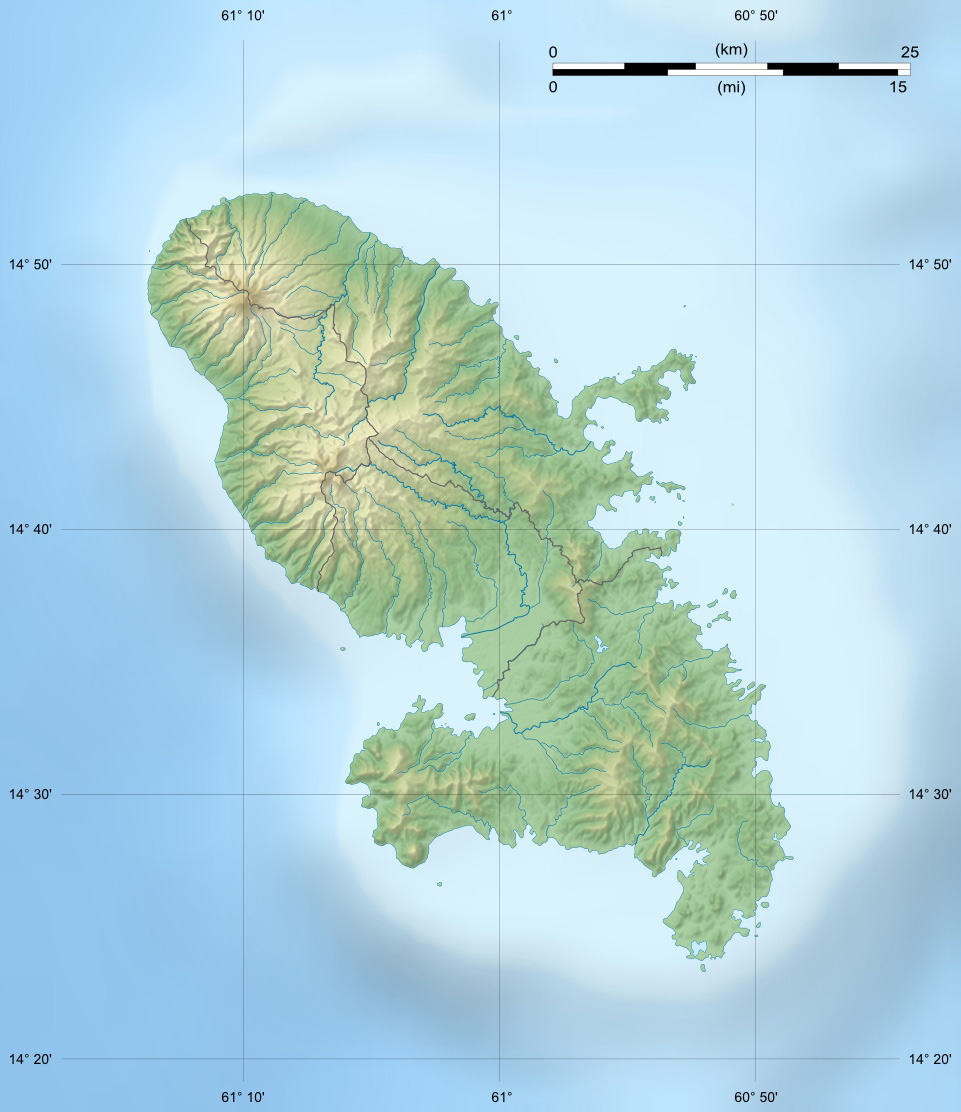
- Location within Martinique
- Location: Martinique

Geology
- Formed by: Subduction zone volcanism
- Mountain type: Stratovolcano
- Volcanic arc: Lesser Antilles Volcanic Arc
- Last eruption: 1929–1932

UNESCO World Heritage Site
- Part of: Volcanoes and Forests of Mount Pelée and the Pitons of Northern Martinique
- Criteria: Natural: viii, x
- Reference: 1657-001
- Inscription: 2023 (45th Session)

Mount Pelée or Mont Pelée (/pəˈleɪ/ pə-LAY; French: la montagne Pelée [la mɔ̃taɲ pəle], lit. 'bald mountain' or 'peeled mountain'; Antillean Creole: Montann Pèlé) is an active stratovolcano at the northern end of Martinique, an island and French overseas department in the Lesser Antilles Volcanic Arc of the Caribbean. Its volcanic cone is composed of stratified layers of hardened ash and solidified lava. Its most recent eruption was in 1932.

The stratovolcano's 1902 eruption destroyed the town of Saint-Pierre, killing 29,000 to 30,000 people in the space of a few minutes, in the worst volcanic disaster of the 20th century. The main eruption, on 8 May 1902, left only three known survivors. Ludger Sylbaris survived because he was in a poorly ventilated, dungeon-like jail cell. Léon Compère-Léandre, living on the edge of the city, escaped with severe burns. The third was a young girl named Havivra Da Ifrile, who fled to a nearby sea cave in a boat, enduring burns from falling ash.

In 2023, it was listed as UNESCO World heritage site.

== Geographical setting and description ==
Mount Pelée is the result of a typical subduction zone. The subduction formed the Lesser Antilles island arc, a curved chain of volcanoes approximately 850 kilometres (530 mi) in length, between Puerto Rico and Venezuela, where the Caribbean Plate meets Atlantic oceanic crust belonging to the South American Plate. Other volcanoes in the island arc are also known for their volcanic activity, including Saint Vincent's La Soufrière, Guadeloupe's La Grande Soufriere volcano, Montserrat's Soufrière Hills, and the submarine volcano Kick 'em Jenny.

== Geological history ==
Volcanologists have identified three different phases in the evolution of Mount Pelée volcano: initial, intermediate, and modern. In an initial phase, called the "Paléo-Pelée" stage, Mount Pelee was a common stratovolcano. The cone of Paléo-Pelée was composed of many layers of lava flows and fragmented volcanic debris. Remains of the Paléo-Pelée cone are still visible at the northern view at the volcano today.

A second stage, now called the intermediate phase, started around 100,000 years ago, after a long period of quiescence. This stage is grouped by the formation of the Morne Macouba lava dome, then later on, the Morne Macouba caldera. During the intermediate phase, there were several eruptions which produced pyroclastic flows like those that destroyed Saint-Pierre in the 1902 eruption. Around 25,000 years ago, a large southwest sector collapse occurred, forming a landslide. This event was similar to the eruption of Mount St. Helens in 1980.

The modern stage of the evolution of Mount Pelée has created most of the current cone, with deposits of pumice and the results of past pyroclastic flows. More than 30 eruptions have been identified during the last 5,000 years of the volcano's activity.

Three thousand years ago, following a large pumice eruption, the Étang Sec (French for Dry Pond) caldera was then formed. The 1902 eruption took place within the Étang Sec crater. This eruption formed many pyroclastic flows and produced a dome that filled the caldera. Mount Pelée continued to erupt until 4 July 1905. Thereafter, the volcano was dormant until 1929.

On 16 September 1929, Mount Pelée began to erupt again. This time, there was no hesitation on the part of authorities and the danger area was immediately evacuated. The 1929 eruption formed a second dome in the Étang Sec caldera and produced pyroclastic flows emptying into the Blanche River valley. Although there were pyroclastic flows, the activity was not as violent as the 1902 activity. It culminated in another "spine" or lava plug, albeit smaller than the 1902 plug, being emplaced at the summit. The activity ended in late 1932.

== Current status ==
The volcano is currently active. A few volcano tectonic earthquakes occur on Martinique every year, and Mount Pelée is under continuous watch by geophysicists and volcanologists (IPGP). Before the 1902 eruption—as early as the summer of 1900—signs of increased fumarole activity were present in the Étang Sec crater. Relatively minor phreatic (steam) eruptions that occurred in 1792 and 1851 were evidence that the volcano was active. Signs of unrest are likely to precede any future eruptive activity from Mount Pelée, and its past activity (including the violent eruptions uncovered by carbon dating) is an extremely important factor for hazard assessment.

The city of Saint-Pierre was never fully rebuilt, though some villages grew up in its place. The estimated population of the Commune of Saint-Pierre in 2023 was 3,961.

On 6 December 2020, The Martinique Volcano Observatory (MVO) raised Mount Pelee's alert level to Yellow [Restless] from Green [Normal] due to an increase in seismicity under the volcano beginning in April 2019, and observations of tremors the previous month.

As far as was known, this was the first sign of activity since the end of the 1929–1932 eruption. This volcano is, of course, highly dangerous, and great vigilance of its activity is required. Whether or not it is going to enter a new eruptive period is currently unknown.

According to the MVO press release:

The increase in seismicity of superficial volcanic origin (up to 4–5 km (2.5–3 mi) below the summit) observed since April 2019, is therefore clearly above the base level characteristic for Mount Pelée.

In April 2019, volcanic seismicity appeared at depth around and under Mount Pelée (more than 10 km (6.2 mi) below sea level). It could correspond to the arrival at depth of magmatic fluids.

Finally, new recorded tremor-type signals were observed on November 8 and 9, 2020: they could correspond to a reactivation of the hydrothermal system.

Even if, in the current state of measurements, there is no deformation of the volcano on the scale of the observation network, the appearance, in a few months, of these three different types of seismic signals of volcanic origin shows a clear change in the behavior of the volcanic system, the activity of which is increasing from the base level observed over several decades.

On May 13, 2025, Observatoire Volcanologique et Sismologique de la Martinique (OVSM) reported that between May 2 and May 9, 2025, 256 earthquakes had occurred. During the month of May, it was reported that 632 earthquakes had occurred. There are no signs of deformation or changes in gas chemistry. These earthquakes are interpreted as magma movement at depth, but not a sign of an impending eruption in the near future.

== Biology ==
The Martinique volcano frog, Allobates chalcopis, is endemic to Mount Pelée, and the only species among related frogs (family Aromobatidae) endemic to an oceanic island.

=== Important bird area ===
A 9,262 ha (22,890-acre) largely forested tract, encompassing the mountain and extending to the sea on its north-western side, has been recognised as an Important Bird Area (IBA) by BirdLife International because it supports populations of bridled quail doves, Lesser Antillean swifts, green and purple-throated caribs, blue headed and Antillean crested hummingbirds, Caribbean elaenias, Lesser Antillean flycatchers, Lesser Antillean pewees, scaly-breasted and pearly-eyed thrashers, brown and grey tremblers, rufous-throated solitaires, Antillean euphonias, Martinique orioles, Lesser Antillean saltators and Lesser Antillean bullfinches.

== Protection ==
On September 16, 2023, the volcanoes and forests of Mount Pelée and the pitons of northern Martinique were listed as UNESCO World Heritage Site. The volcanic mountain range represents 12% of Martinique's territory. It is the 7th natural site in France to be listed as a UNESCO World Heritage site. World Heritage status could also have a positive impact on tourism and the economy, increasing visitor numbers by 30 to 40%, according to the Martinique Nature Park.

== In literature ==
- Texaco by Patrick Chamoiseau (Gallimard, 1992. Trans. Rose-Myriam Réjouis and Val Vinokurov, Vintage International, 1998). In this novel that retraces several generations of Martinique's history, Esternome, the protagonist of the novel's first part, witnesses firsthand the destruction caused by the volcano. Marie-Sophie Laborieux, Esternome's daughter and the novel's narrator, recounts her father's experiences and also discusses the traces of this event she has seen herself, including burn scars on her father's body and ossuaries in the ruins of Saint-Pierre. The eruption and its aftermath are discussed in the section "Amour grillée" ("Barbecued Love").
- Ti-Coyo and his shark (by Clément Richer. Trans. Gerard Hopkins) (Rupert Hart-Davis 1 January 1951) (First published 1 January 1941 as Ti-Coyo et son requin). In this humorous fable, wickedness triumphs because it is charming. Set on the exotic Caribbean island of Martinique before, during, and after the infamous eruption of Mont Pelée in 1902. Ti-Coyo, a shrewd and winning mixed race boy, rescues a wounded baby shark, which becomes his faithful companion as it grows into a monster fearful to everyone but him. With the help of this behemoth, Ti-Coyo becomes rich and wins the flaxen-haired princess of his dreams. It is the shark, too, who saves Ti-Coyo, his ill-assorted parents, and his sweetheart when Mont Pelée pours destruction over St. Pierre.
- The Day The World Ended by Gordon Thomas and Max Morgan Witts (Stein and Day, 1969, 306 pp). The authors used contemporary records and survivor accounts to construct a historical novel of the events and lives of residents of Martinique, leading up to and through the eruption of May 8, 1902.
- The World on Fire by Murat Halstead (published by International Publishing Society, 1902).

== See also ==
- List of volcanic eruptions by death toll
- Mount Pinatubo
- Mount Vesuvius
