= Albert Charles Peale =

American geologist, mineralogist and paleobotanist

- Born: April 1, 1849; Heckscherville, Pennsylvania
- Died: December 5, 1914 (aged 65); Philadelphia
- Occupations: geologist, mineralogist and paleobotanist

Albert Charles Peale (1 April 1849 – 5 December 1914) was an American geologist, mineralogist and paleobotanist.

== Biography ==
Born in Heckscherville, Pennsylvania, Albert C. Peale was the son of Charles Willson Peale (1821–1871) and Harriet Friel. Albert Peale's paternal grandfather was Rubens Peale, and his paternal great-grandfather was the painter Charles Willson Peale. Albert Peale graduated from the Central High School, Philadelphia with A.B. in 1868 and A.M. in 1873. He studied in 1870 at the auxiliary medical department of the University of Pennsylvania and graduated there with M.D. in 1871. Although he had a medical degree, he never practiced medicine.

From 1871 to 1879, Peale served as a mineralogist and geologist for the United States Geological and Geographic Survey of the Territories. As such, he traveled on several of the Ferdinand Hayden expeditions that explored and mapped the western United States, including the Hayden Geological Survey of 1871 that surveyed what would become Yellowstone National Park. In 1875, he married Emilie Wiswell, the daughter of the Rev. George F. Wiswell (1820-1892), a Philadelphia minister and former president of Delaware College (today the University of Delaware). From 1882 to 1898, he was a geologist with the United States Geological Survey. From 1898 to his death in 1914 in Philadelphia, Peale was a paleobotanist for the United States National Museum. He was the author of numerous geographic and geological papers, reports, and monographs. From 1884 to 1897, he was Secretary of the Chemical Society of Washington.

Peale's name has been attached to several geological features located in widely separated localities, including Peale Island, the most southerly island in Yellowstone Lake; Mount Peale, the highest peak in the La Sal Mountains in eastern Utah, near the Colorado border; and the Peale Mountains in eastern Caribou County, Idaho.

== Selected publications ==
- Yellowstone National Park and Thermal Springs. 1882.
- Peale, Albert Charles (1886). Lists and Analyses of the Mineral Springs of the United States.
- The Classification of American Mineral Waters. 1887.
- The Natural Mineral Waters of the United States. 1895.
- Classification of Mineral Waters. 1902.
- Biographical Sketches of Charles Willson Peale and of Titian R. Peale. 1905.
- Peale, A. C. (1912). "The Stratigraphic Position and Age of the Judith River Formation". The Journal of Geology. 20 (6): 530–549. Bibcode:1912JG.....20..530P. doi:10.1086/621995. JSTOR 30061099. S2CID 224841558.

== See also ==
- Hayden Geological Survey of 1871
