= South Mountain (La Sal Mountains) =

Mountain in San Juan County, Utah, United States

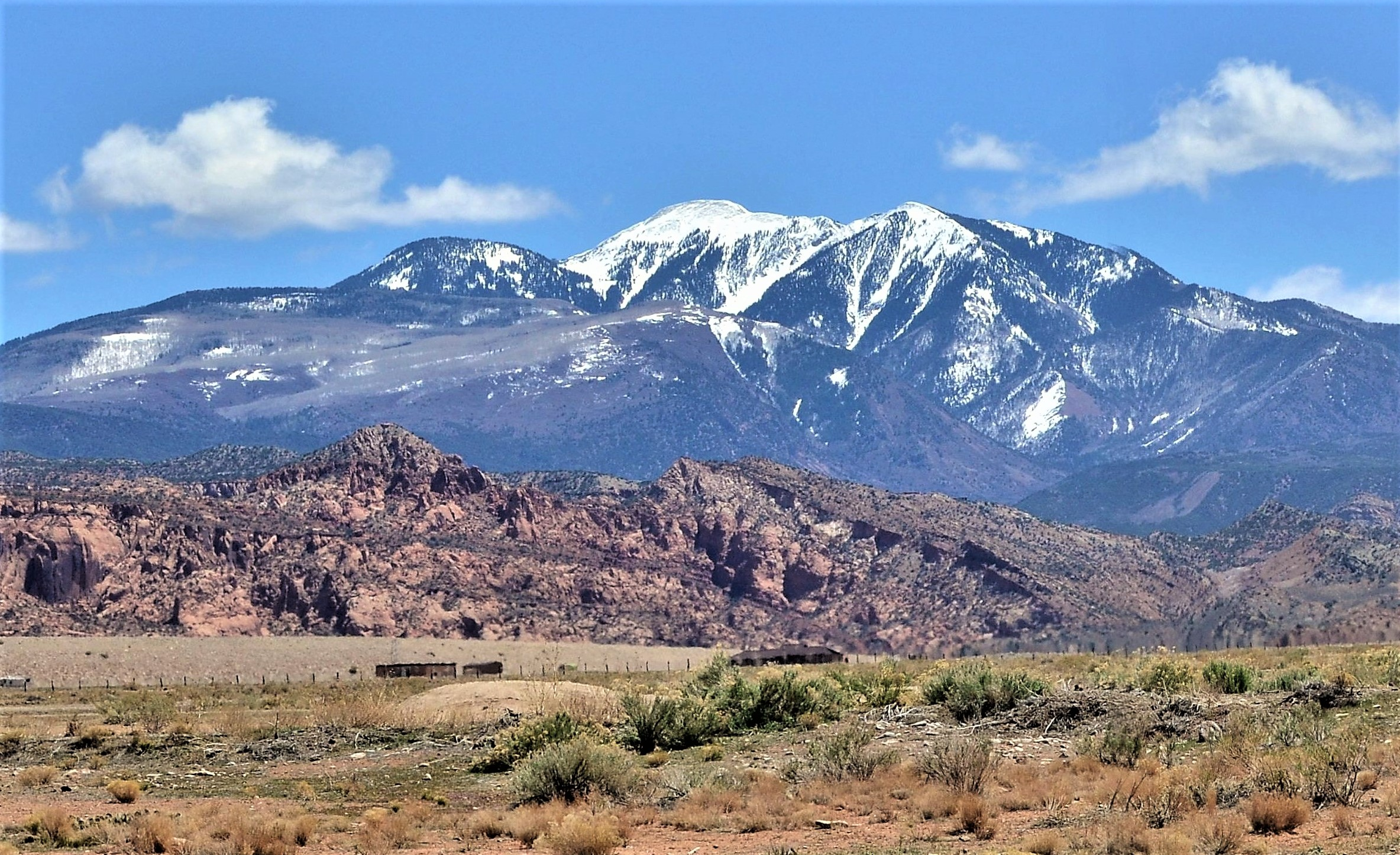
- South Mountain, west aspect

Highest point
- Elevation: 11,798 ft (3,596 m)
- Prominence: 1,657 ft (505 m)
- Parent peak: Mount Tukuhnikivatz
- Isolation: 2.45 mi (3.94 km)
- Coordinates: 38°24′04″N 109°15′40″W

Geography
- Location within Utah Location within the United States
- Location: San Juan County, Utah
- Parent range: La Sal Mountains
- Topo map: USGS Mount Tukuhnikivatz

Climbing
- Easiest route: class 2

South Mountain is an 11,798-foot (3,596 m) peak in San Juan County, Utah, United States, about 5 miles (8.0 km) north of La Sal, UtahLa Sal. It is part of the La Sal Mountains. Precipitation runoff from this mountain drains into tributaries of the Colorado River. The nearest town is Moab, 20 mi (32 km) to the northwest, and the nearest higher neighbor is Mount Tukuhnikivatz, 2.64 mi (4.25 km) to the north.

== Climate ==
Spring and fall are the most favorable seasons to visit the South Mountain area. According to the Köppen climate classification system, it is located in a Cold semi-arid climate zone, which is defined by the coldest month having an average mean temperature below 32 °F (0 °C), and at least 50% of the total annual precipitation being received during the spring and summer. This desert climate receives less than 10 inches (250 millimeters) of annual rainfall, and snowfall is generally light during the winter.

== Gallery ==
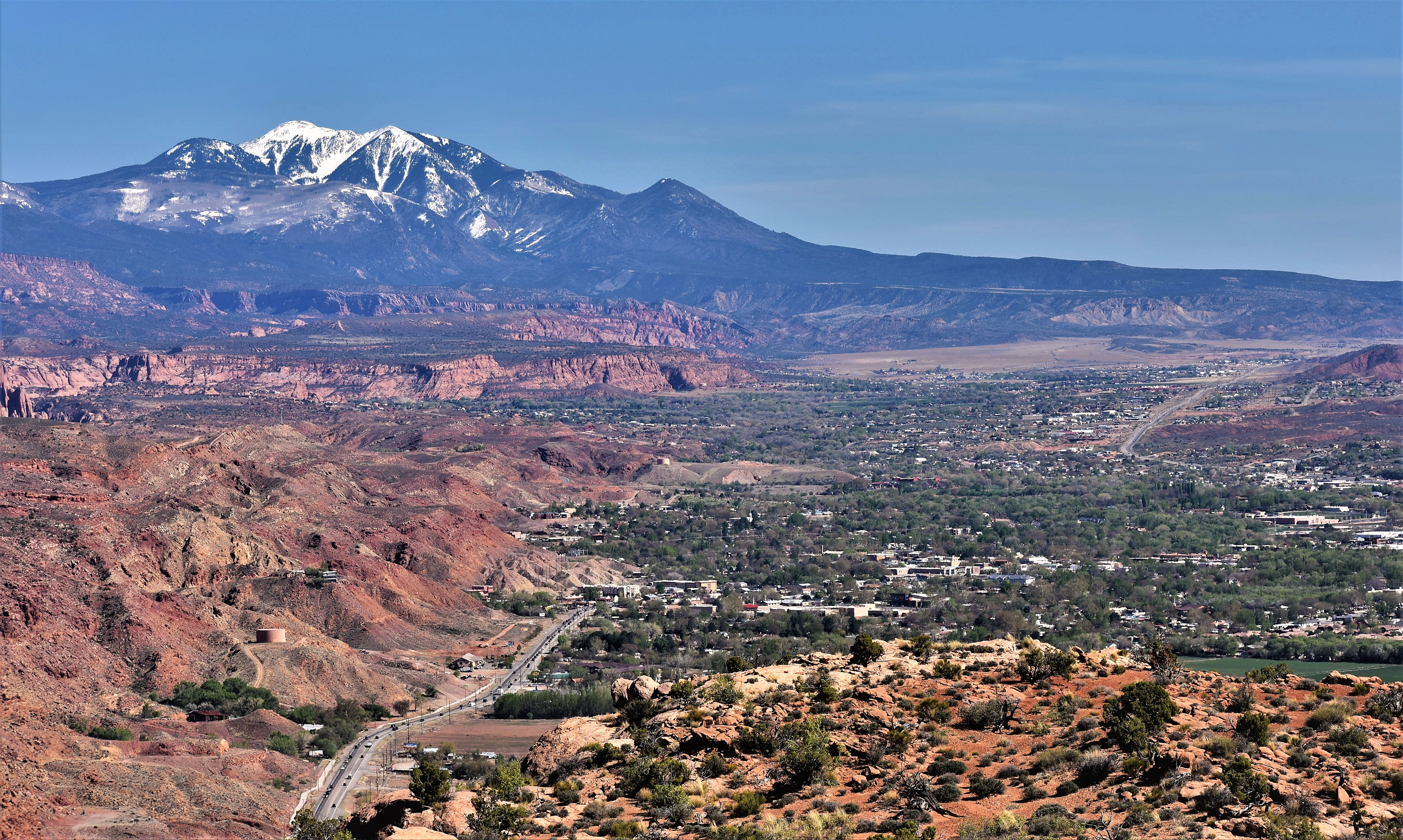
South Mountain beyond Moab

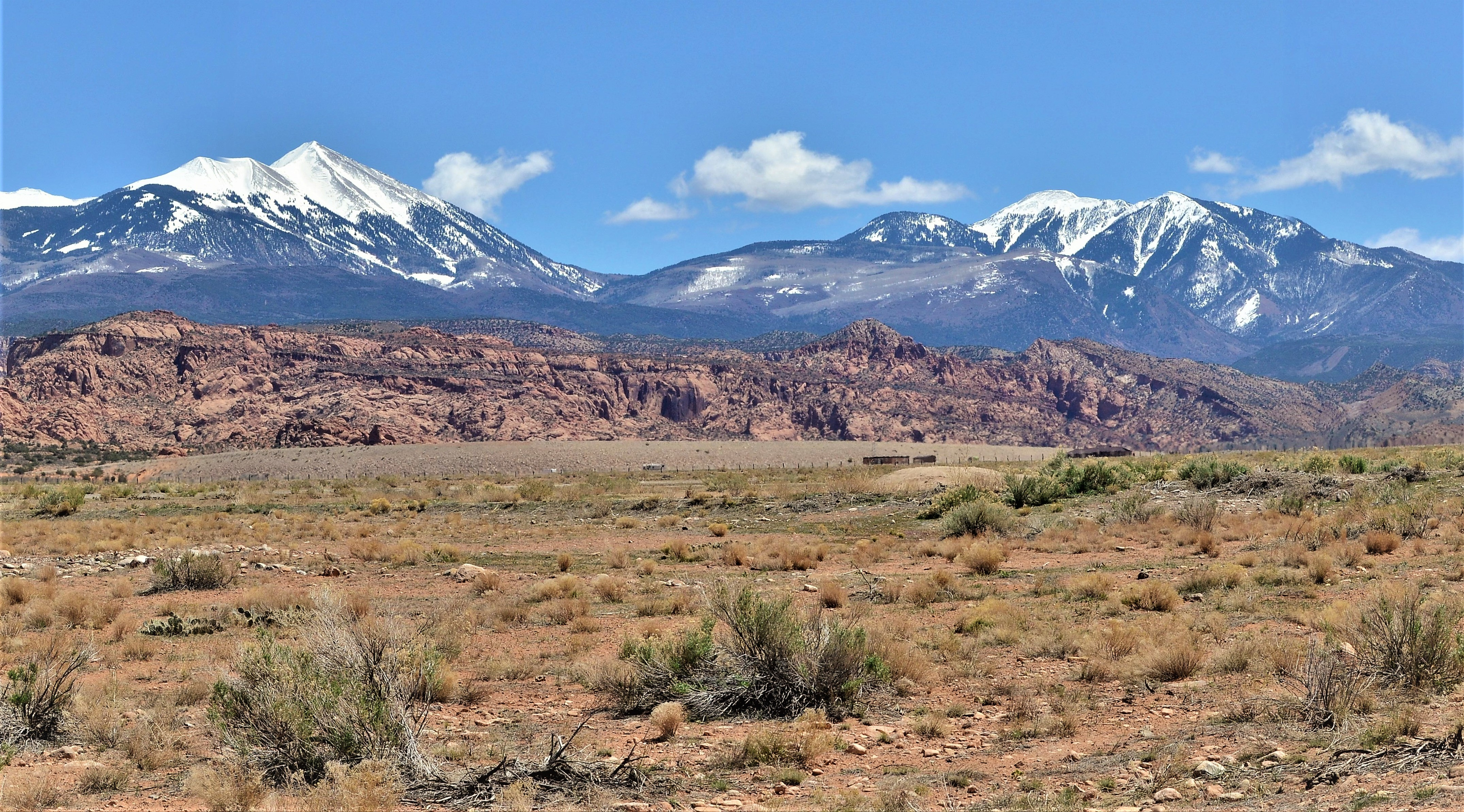
Mt. Tukuhnikivatz (left} and South Mountain (right)

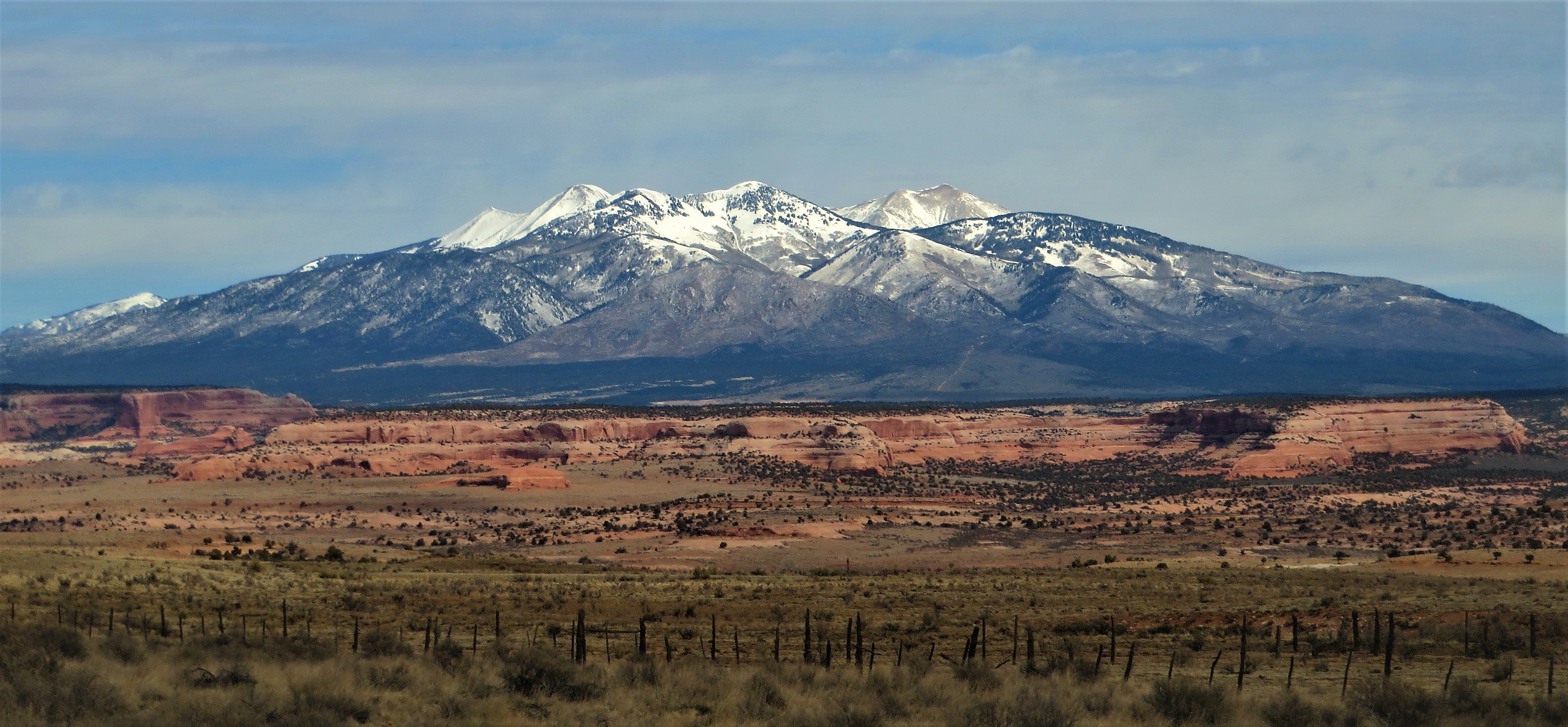
South aspect

== See also ==
- List of mountain peaks of Utah
- Colorado Plateau
