= Geyser Pass =

Mountain pass in Utah

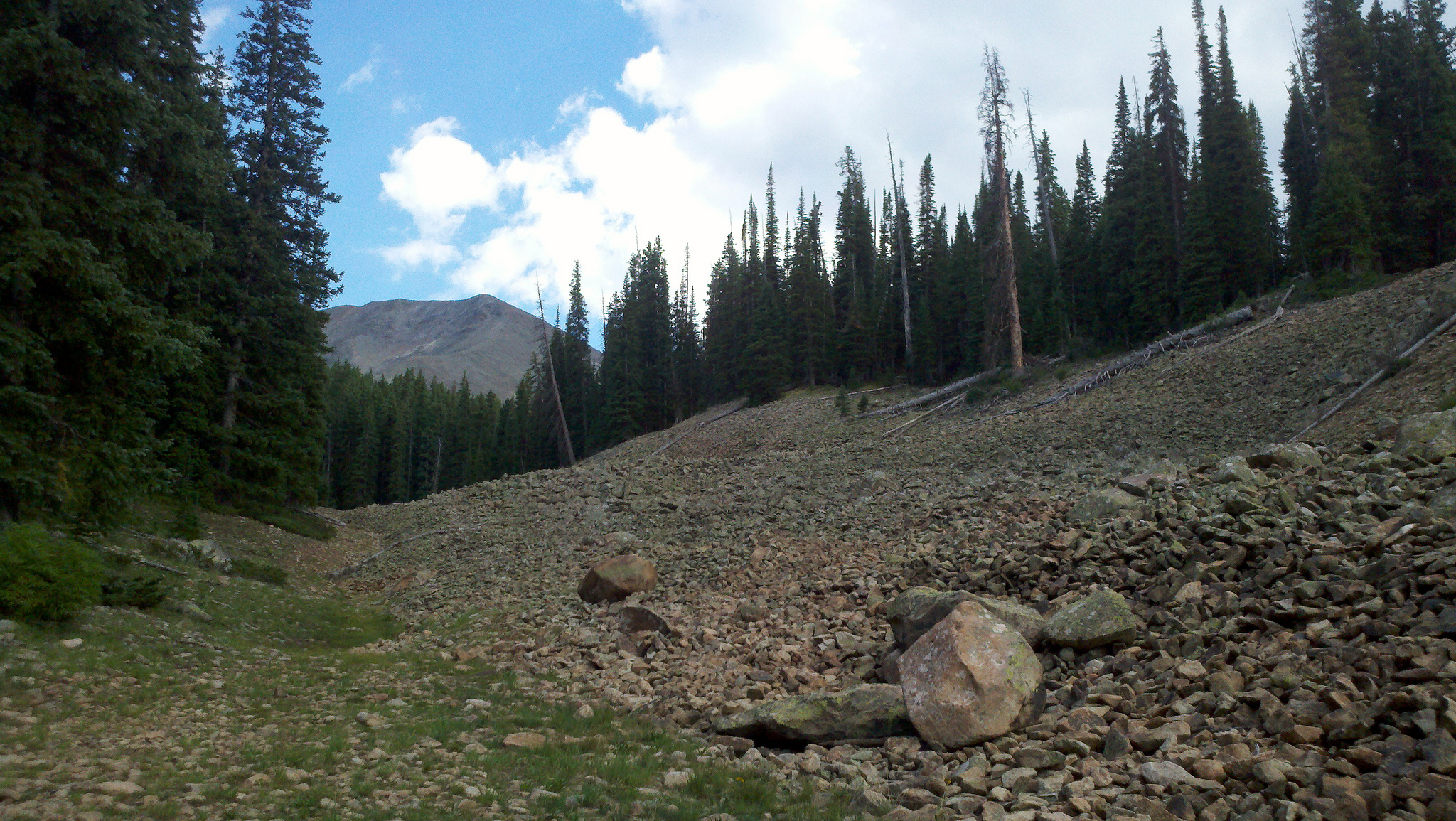
- Rock Slide Remnants at Geyser Pass
- Interactive map of Geyser Pass
- Elevation: 10,528 feet (3,209 m)
- Traversed by: Geyser Pass Road

Third Approach
- Location: San Juan County, Utah
- Range: La Sal Range
- Coordinates: 38°29′11″N 109°13′55″W

Geyser Pass is a mountain pass in the La Sal Range of Utah, United States. The 10,528-foot (3,209 m) pass is not named after a geyser, but for cattleman Al Geyser, who grazed his stock in the area in the 1880s.

== See also ==
- List of mountain passes
