= Mount Mellenthin =

Mountain in San Juan County, Utah, United States

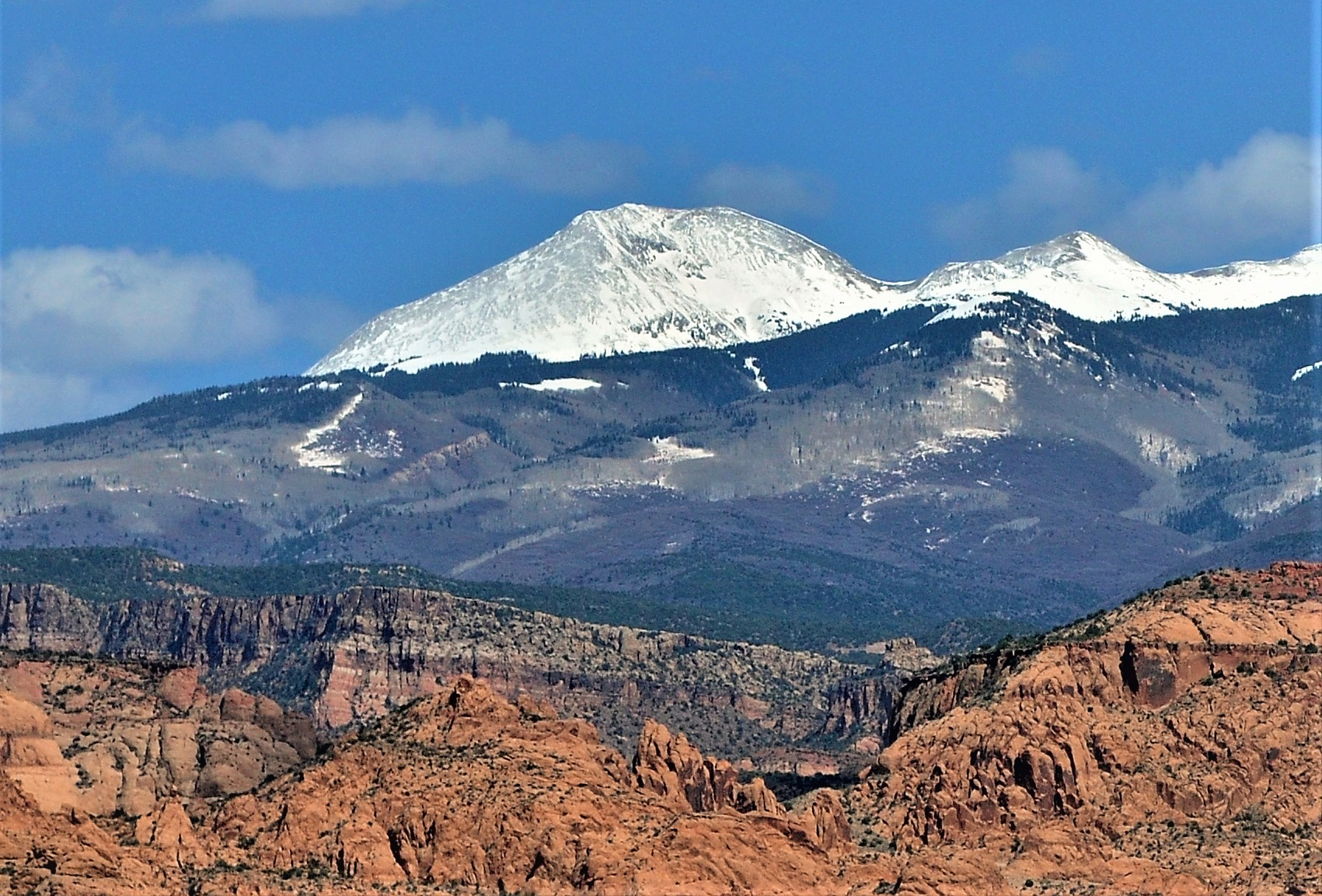
- West aspect

Highest point
- Elevation: 12,645 ft (3,854 m)
- Prominence: 645 ft (197 m)
- Parent peak: Mount Peale (12,721 ft)
- Isolation: 1.75 mi (2.82 km)
- Coordinates: 38°27′47″N 109°14′02″W

Naming
- Etymology: Rudolf E. Mellenthin

Geography
- Location within Utah Location within the United States
- Country: United States
- State: Utah
- County: San Juan
- Parent range: La Sal Mountains
- Topo map: USGS Mount Peale

Geology
- Rock age: Oligocene
- Mountain type: Laccolith

Climbing
- Easiest route: class 2

Mount Mellenthin is a 12,645-foot (3,854 m) elevation summit located in San Juan County, Utah, United States. Mount Mellenthin is the second-highest peak of the La Sal Mountains, and second-highest in the county. It is situated in a dry, rugged, sparsely settled region, and set on land administered by Manti-La Sal National Forest. Precipitation runoff from this mountain drains into tributaries of the Colorado River. The nearest town is Moab, 20 mi (32 km) to the northwest, and the nearest higher neighbor is Mount Peale, 1.7 mi (2.7 km) to the south. The mountain's name honors Rudolf E. Mellenthin (1884–1918), forest ranger of La Sal National Forest, who was shot to death near this peak on August 23, 1918, while attempting to apprehend two draft evaders. This geographical feature's toponym was officially adopted in 1932 by the U.S. Board on Geographic Names.

== Climate ==
Spring and fall are the most favorable seasons to visit Mount Mellenthin. According to the Köppen climate classification system, it is located in a Cold semi-arid climate zone, which is defined by the coldest month having an average mean temperature below 32 °F (0 °C), and at least 50% of the total annual precipitation being received during the spring and summer. This desert climate receives less than 10 inches (250 millimeters) of annual rainfall, and snowfall is generally light during the winter.

== Gallery ==
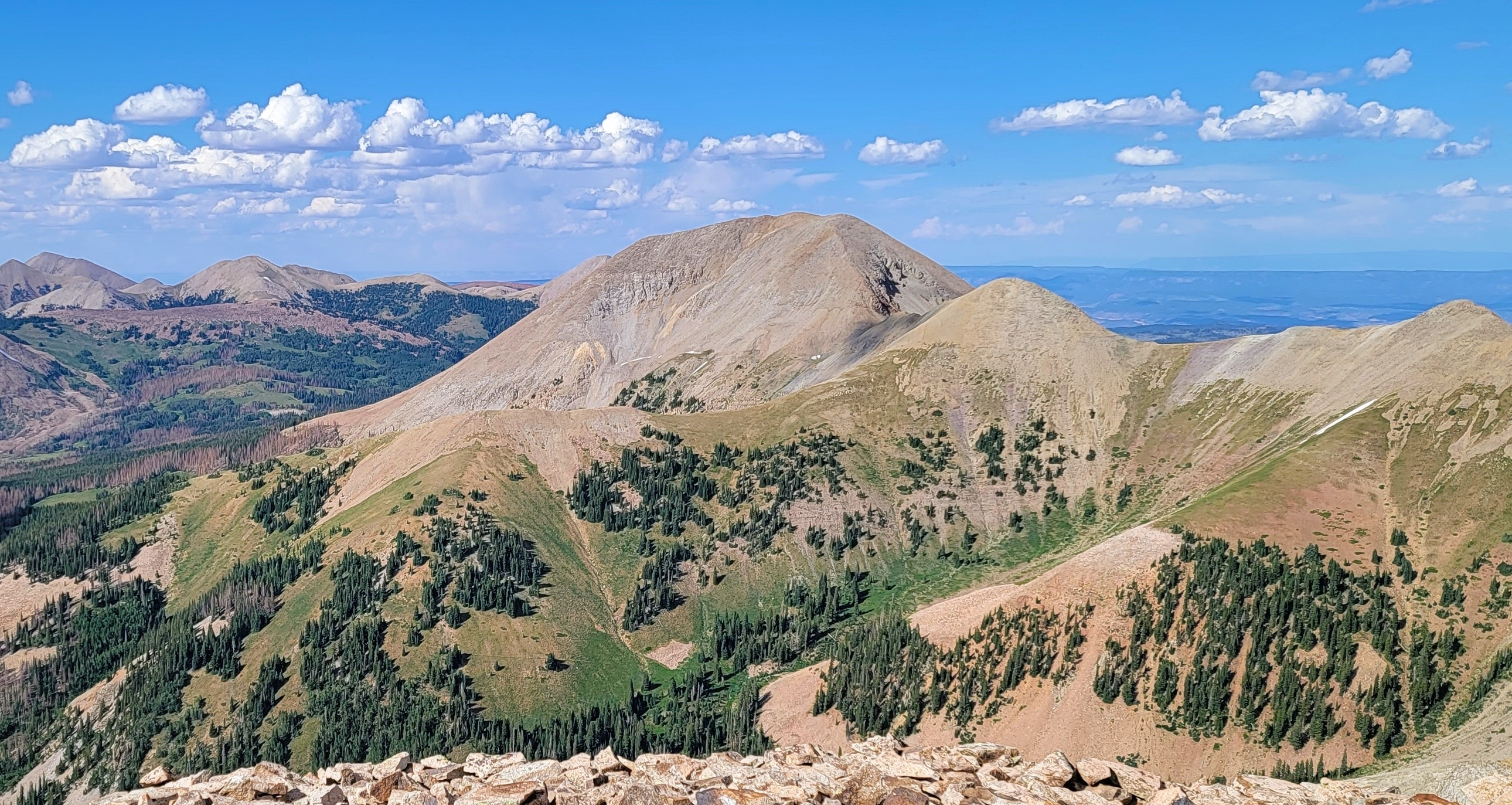
Southwest aspect viewed from Mt. Tuk

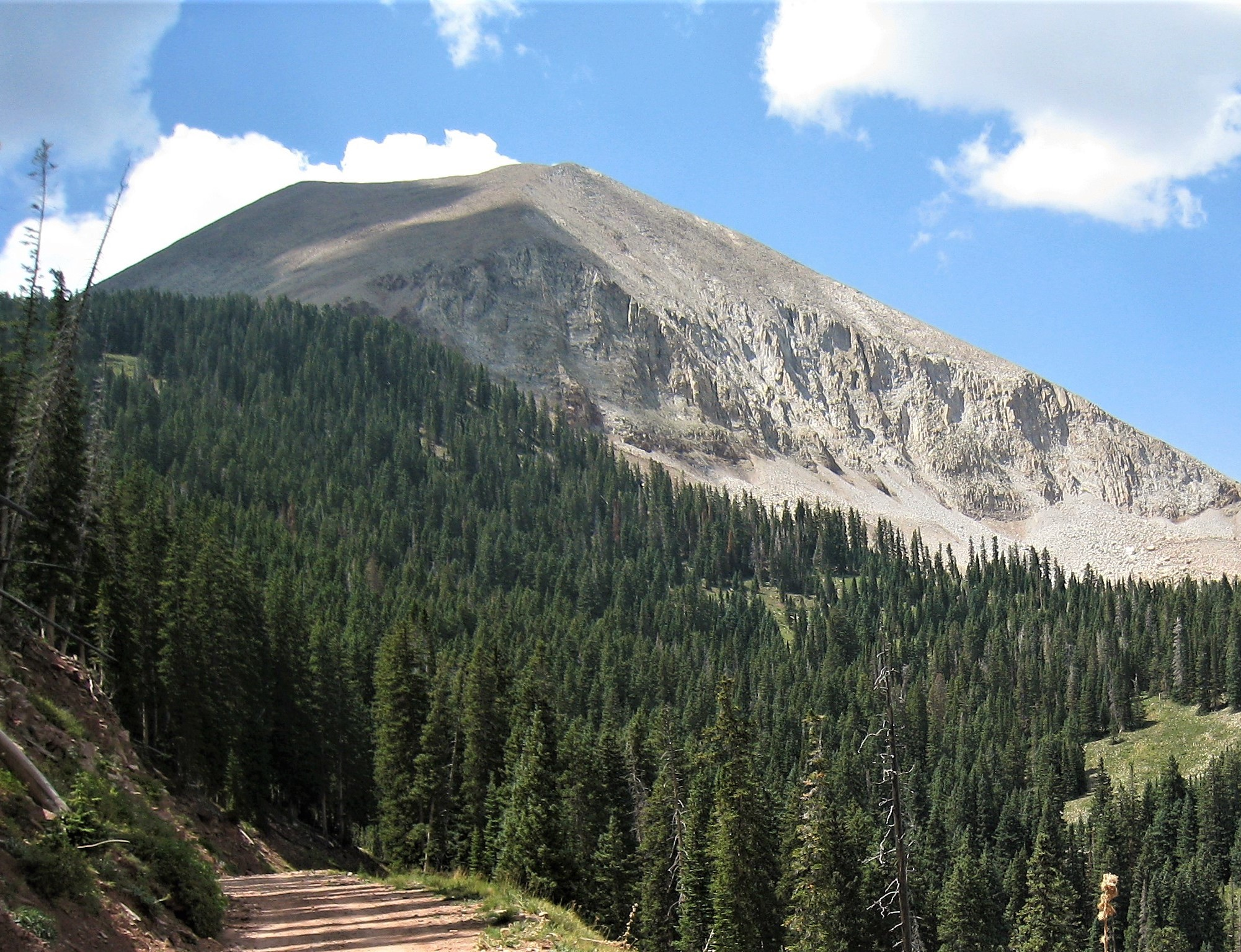
East aspect

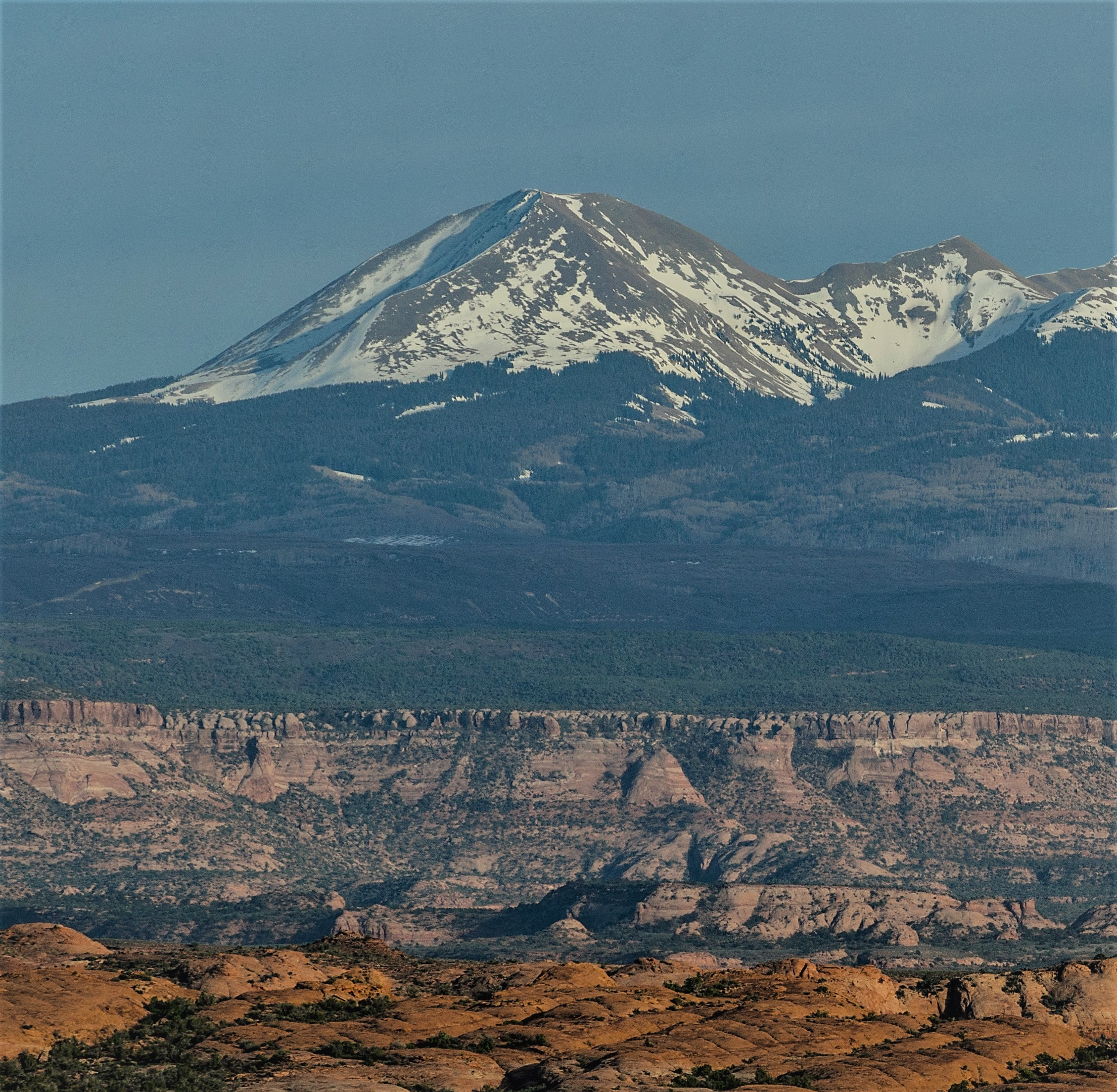
From Arches National Park

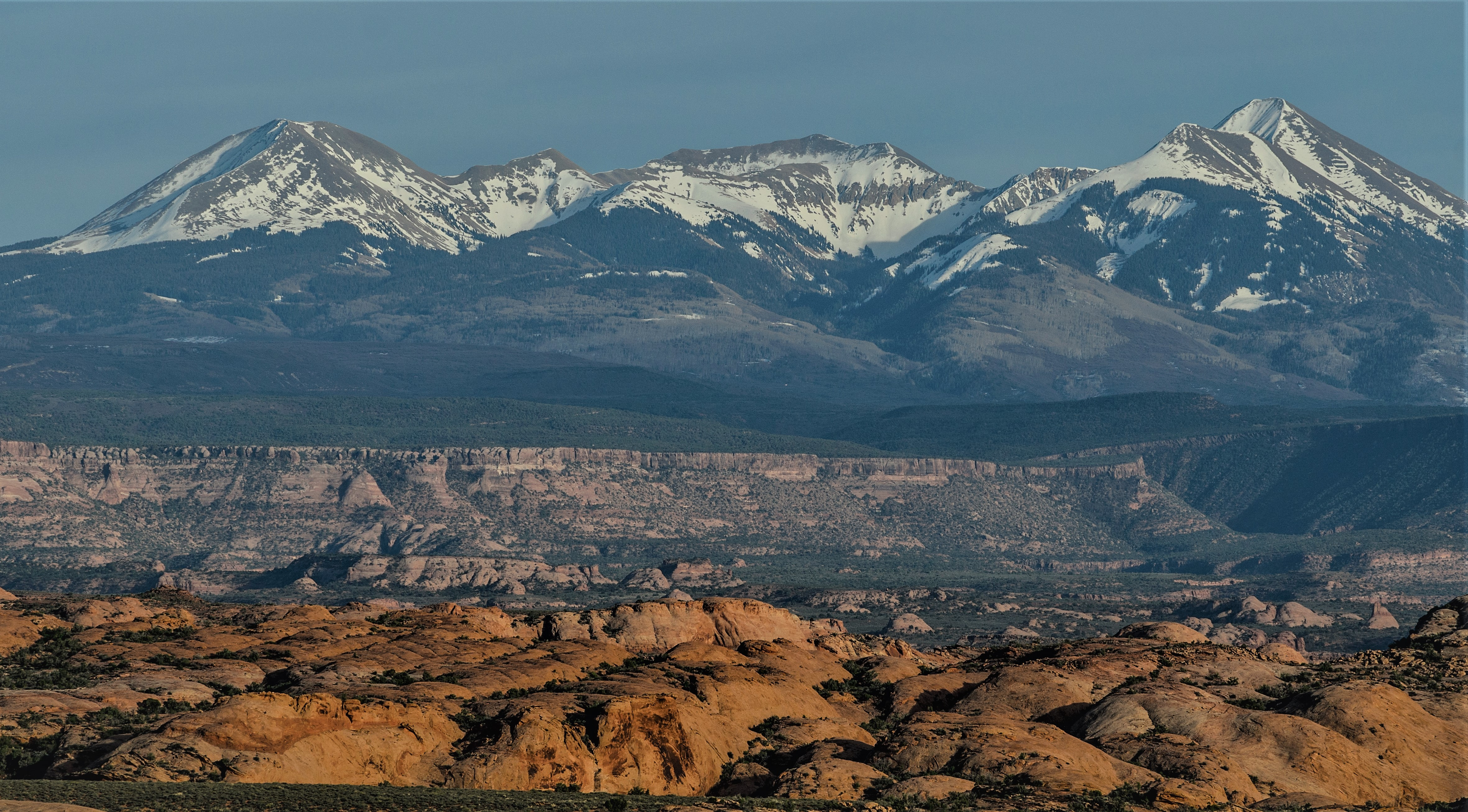
Mount Mellenthin (left), Mount Tukuhnikivatz (right)

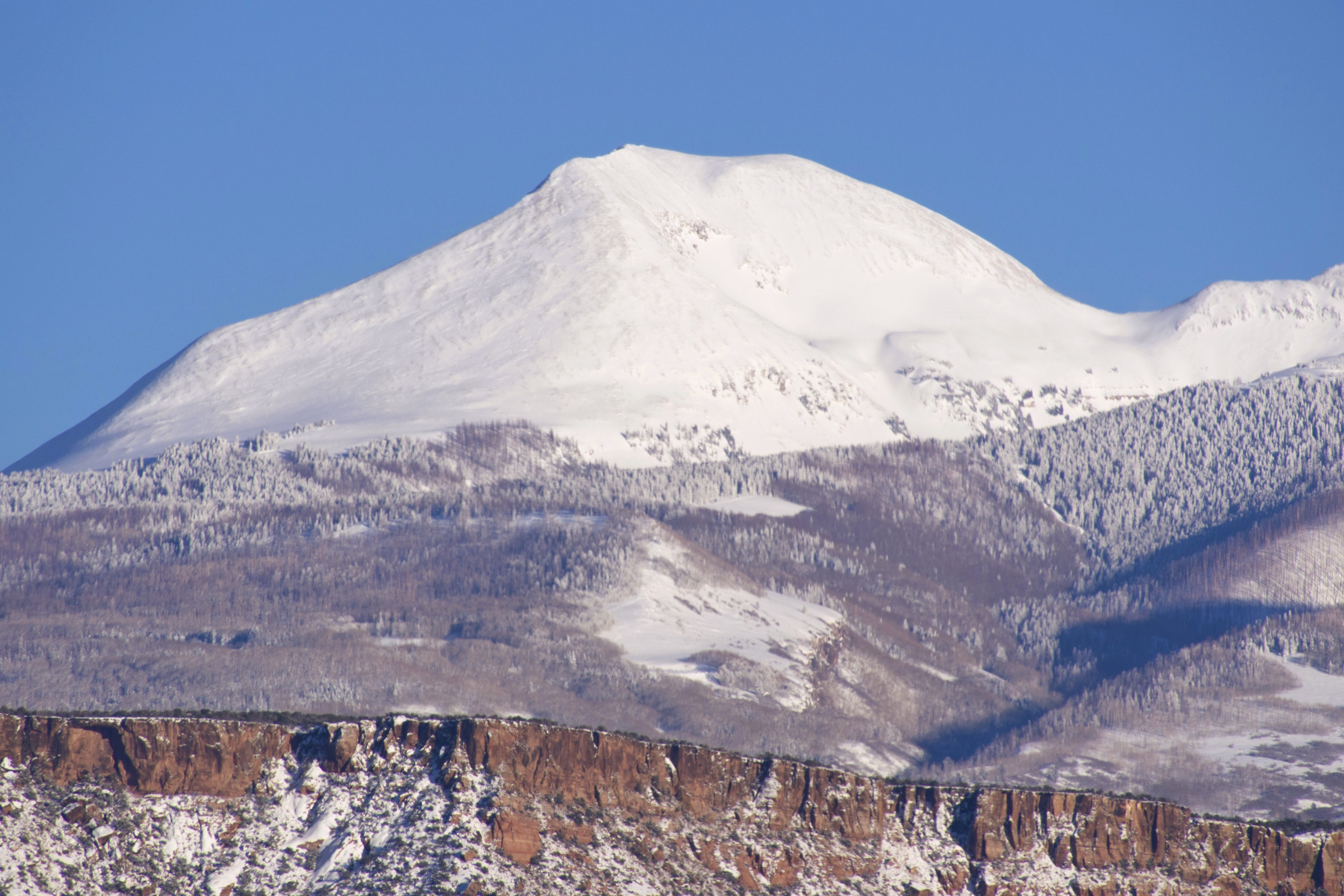
West aspect

== See also ==
- Colorado Plateau
- List of mountain peaks of Utah
