= Mount Tukuhnikivatz =

Mountain San Juan County, Utah, United States

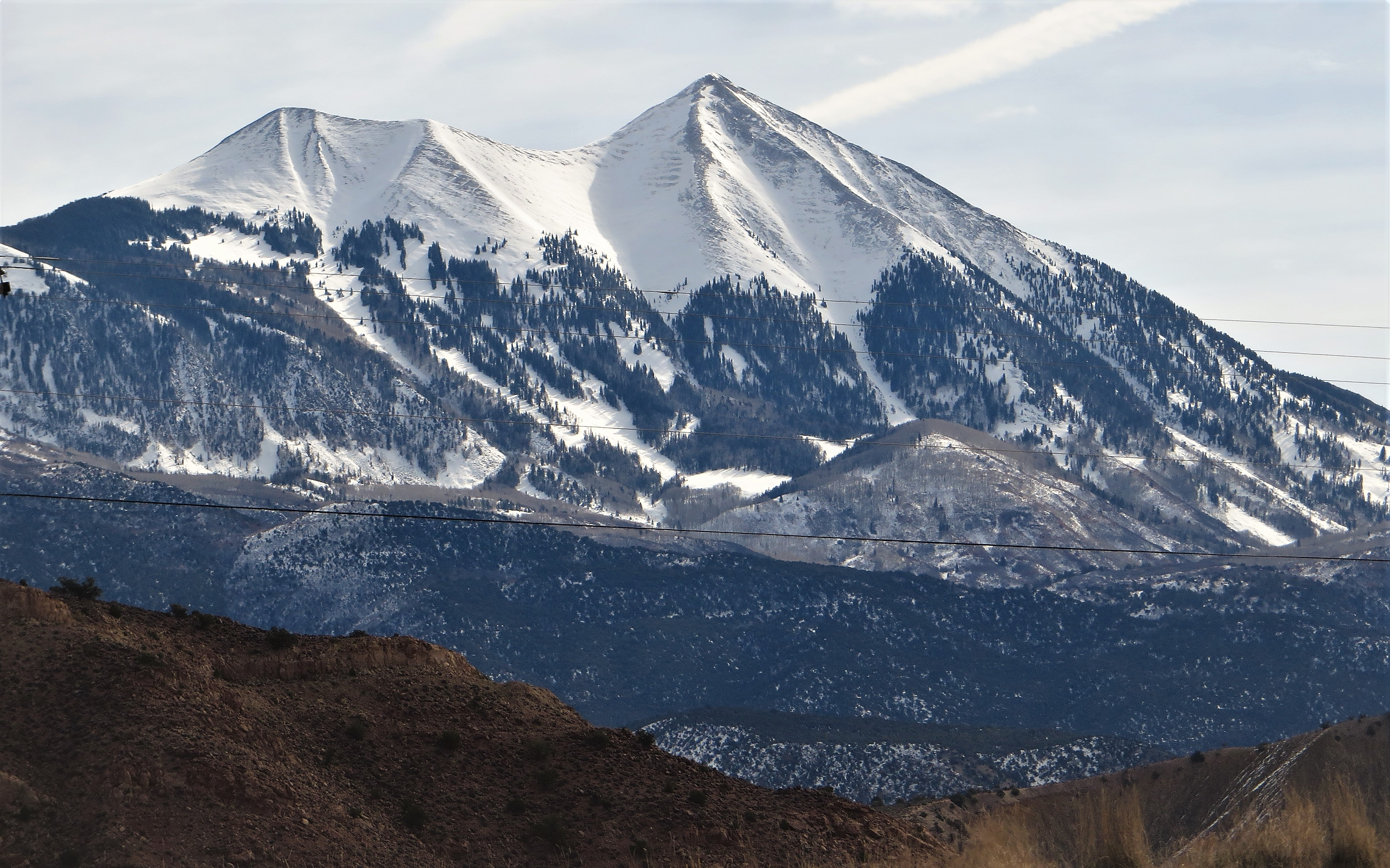
- West aspect, from Highway 191

Highest point
- Elevation: 12,482 ft (3,805 m)
- Prominence: 722 ft (220 m)
- Parent peak: Mount Peale (12,721 ft)
- Isolation: 1.67 mi (2.69 km)
- Coordinates: 38°26′22″N 109°15′36″W

Naming
- English translation: Where the sun sets last
- Language of name: North American Indian languages

Geography
- Location within Utah Location within the United States
- Location: San Juan County, Utah, U.S.
- Parent range: La Sal Mountains
- Topo map: USGS Mount Tukuhnikivatz

Geology
- Rock age: Oligocene
- Mountain type: Laccolith
- Rock type: igneous

Climbing
- Easiest route: class 2 scrambling

Mount Tukuhnikivatz is a 12,482-foot (3,805 m) elevation summit located in San Juan County, Utah, United States. Mount Tukuhnikivatz is the third-highest peak of the La Sal Mountains, and is the premier ski mountaineering destination in the La Sals. It is situated in a dry, rugged, sparsely settled region, and set on land administered by Manti-La Sal National Forest. Precipitation runoff from this mountain drains into tributaries of the Colorado River. The nearest town is Moab, 19 mi (31 km) to the northwest, and the nearest higher neighbor is Mount Peale, 1.7 mi (2.7 km) to the east. The mountain's name is a Native American word that translates as "Where the sun sets last." Locals call it Mount Tuk for short. This mountain has a subsidiary peak unofficially called Little Tuk (12,048 feet), approximately one-half mile to the north-northwest.

== Climate ==
Spring and fall are the most favorable seasons to visit Mount Tukuhnikivatz. According to the Köppen climate classification system, it is located in a Cold semi-arid climate zone, which is defined by the coldest month having an average mean temperature below 32 °F (0 °C), and at least 50% of the total annual precipitation being received during the spring and summer. This desert climate receives less than 10 inches (250 millimeters) of annual rainfall, and snowfall is generally light during the winter.

== Gallery ==
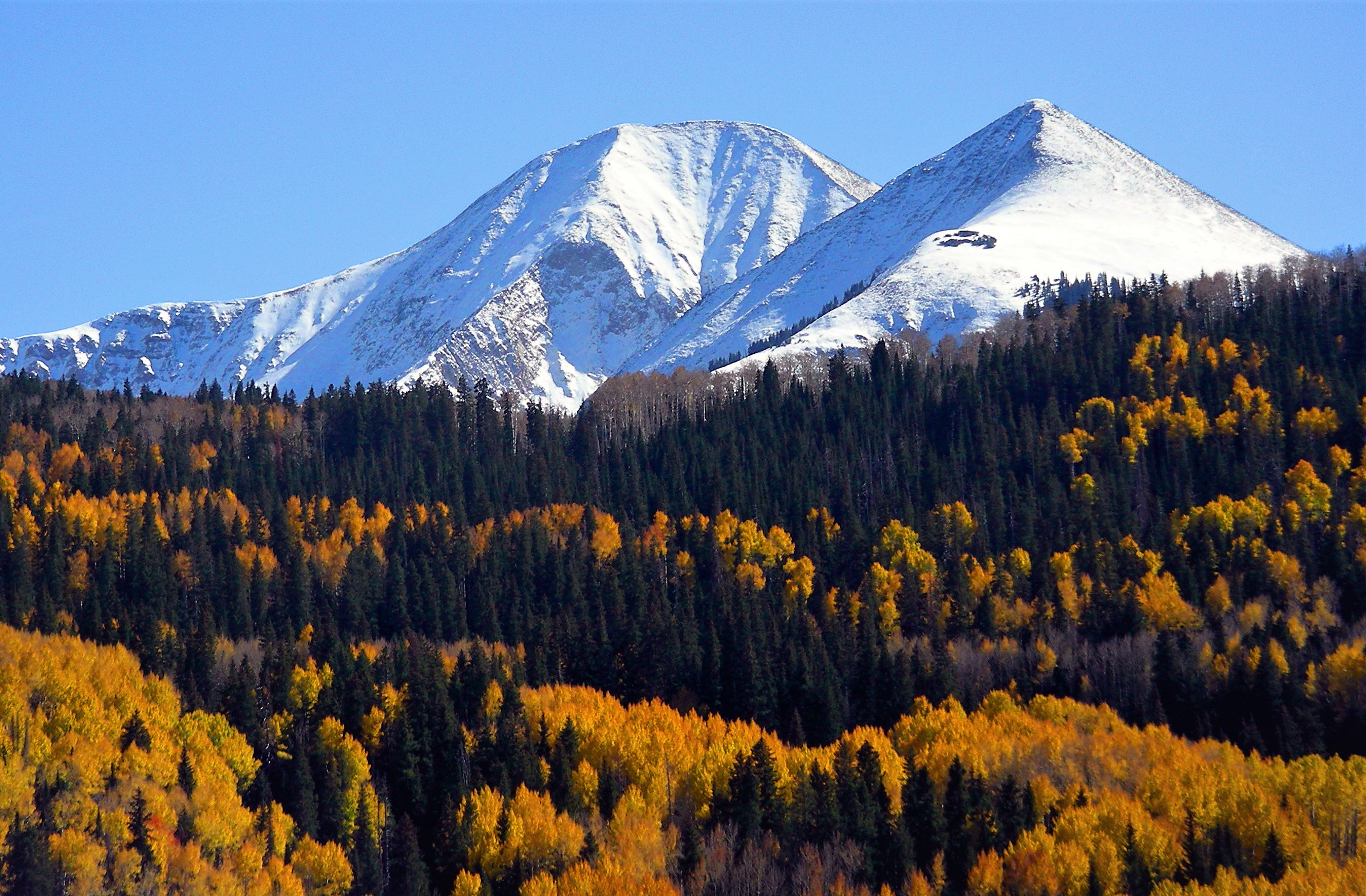
Mt. Tukuhnikivatz and Little Tuk (right), from the north

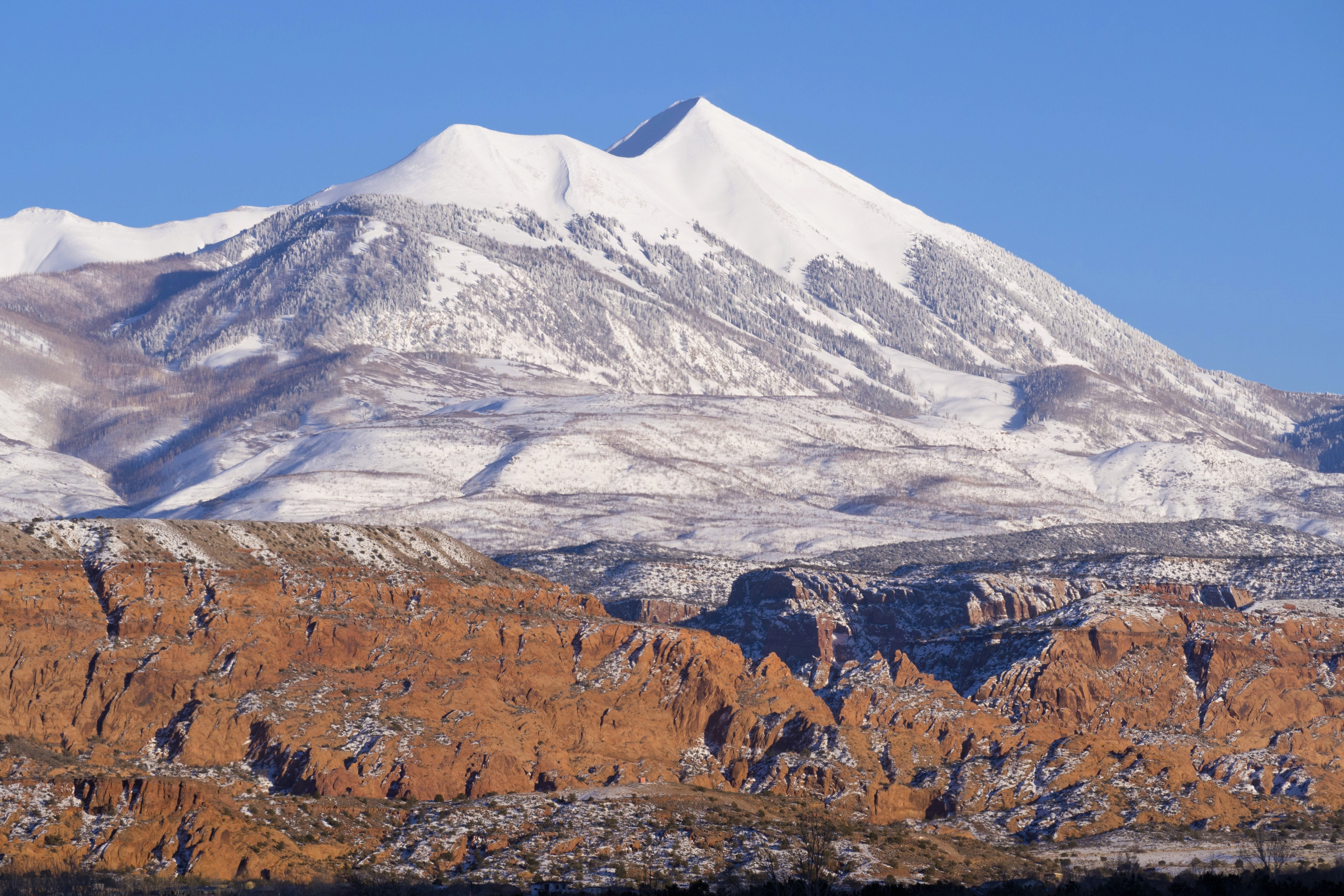
West aspect

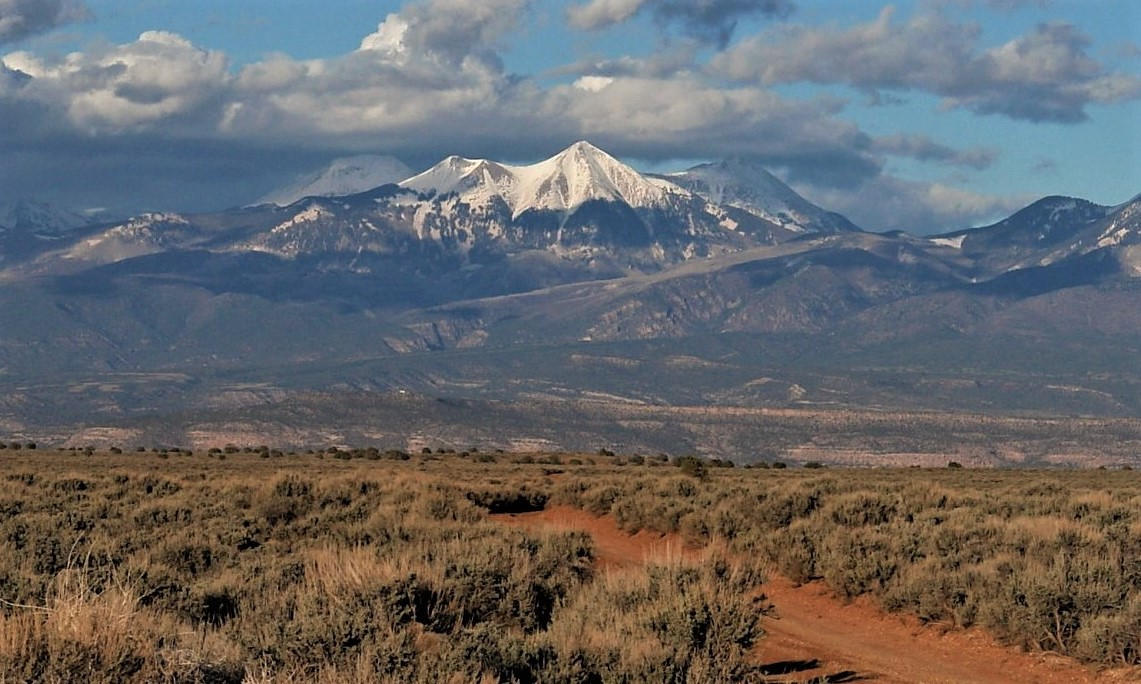
Tukuhnikivatz from southwest

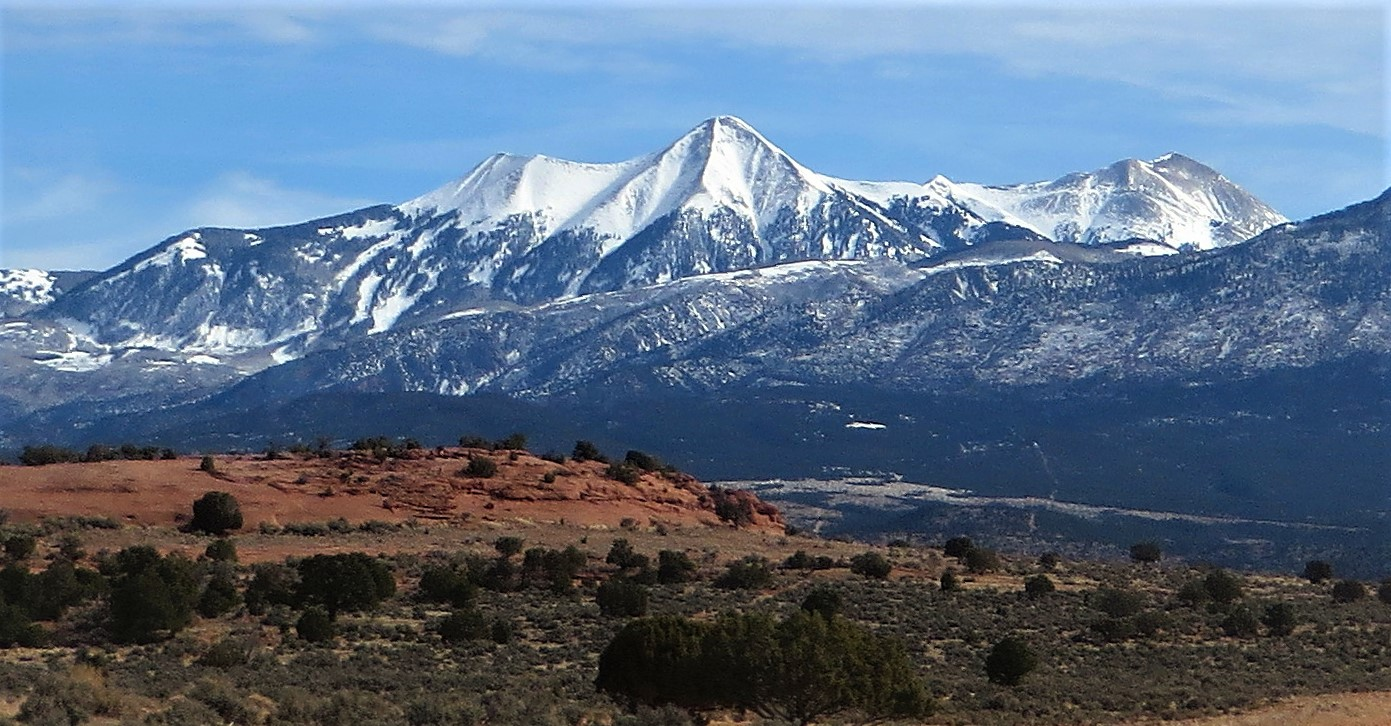
West aspect, Mt. Tukuhnikivatz centered, Mt. Peale to right

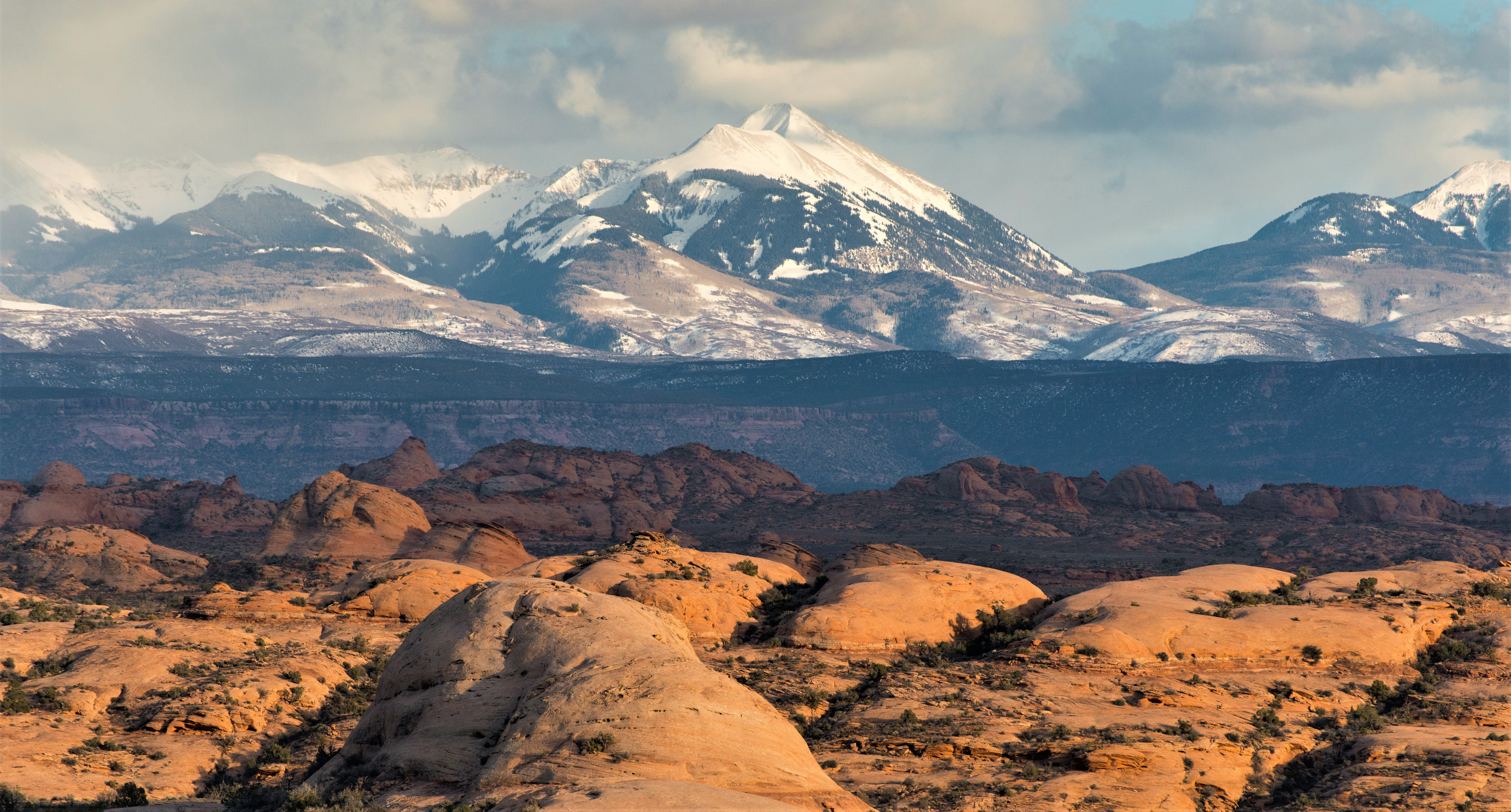
From northwest, with petrified dunes in foreground

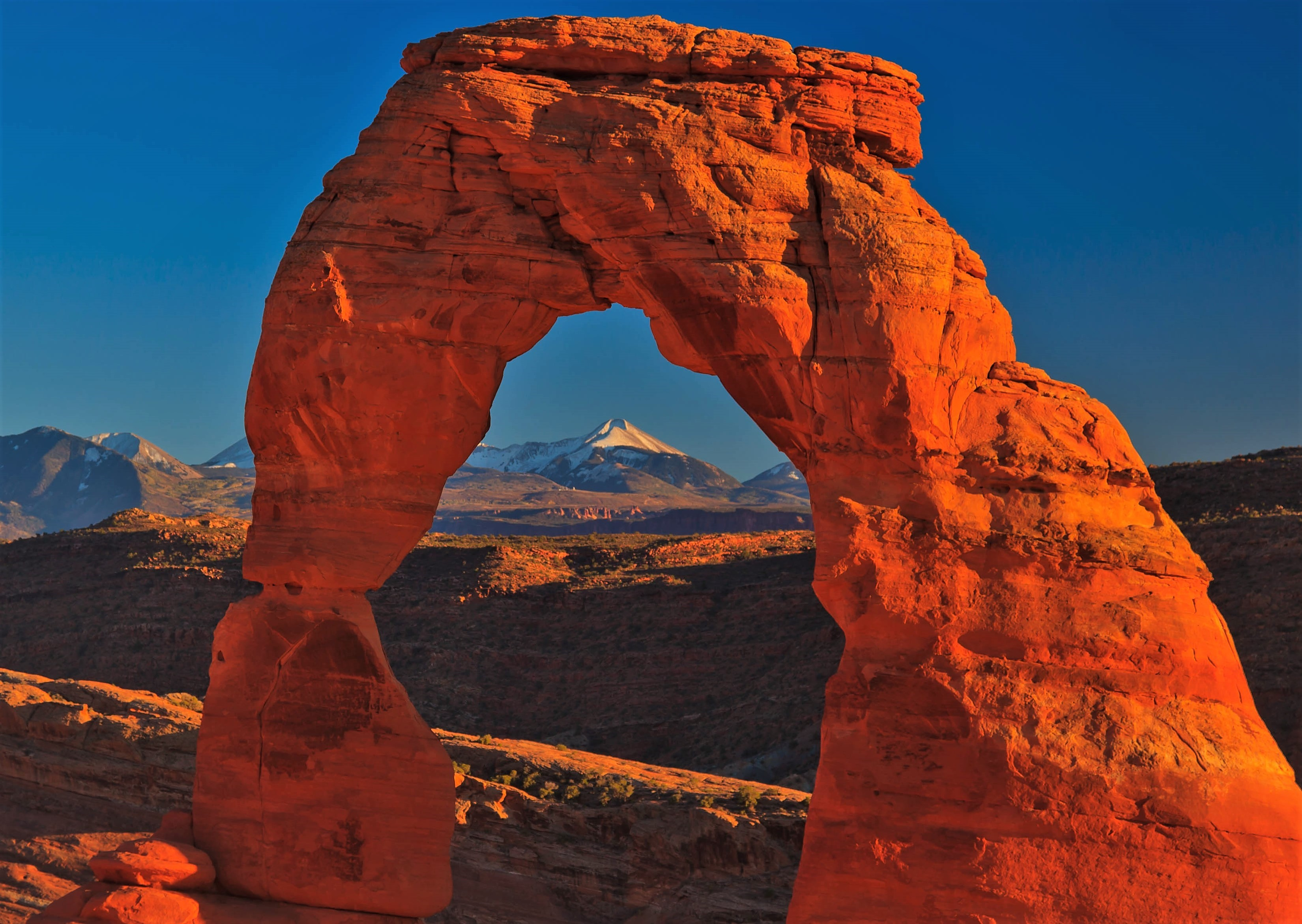
Mt. Tukuhnikivatz framed by Delicate Arch

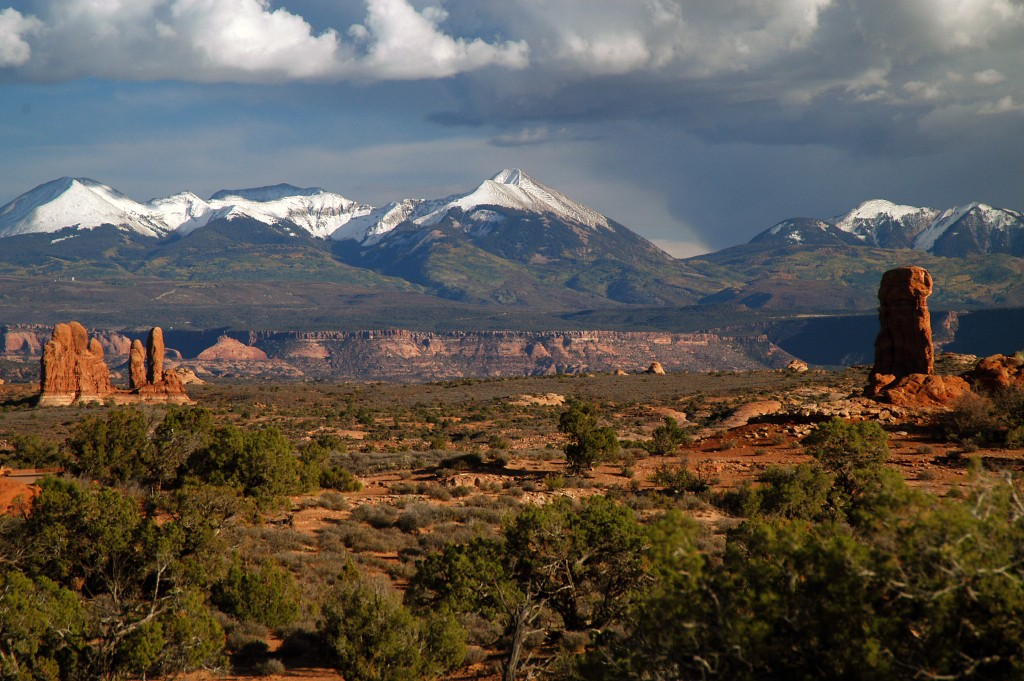
Mt. Tukuhnikivatz centered, from Arches National Park

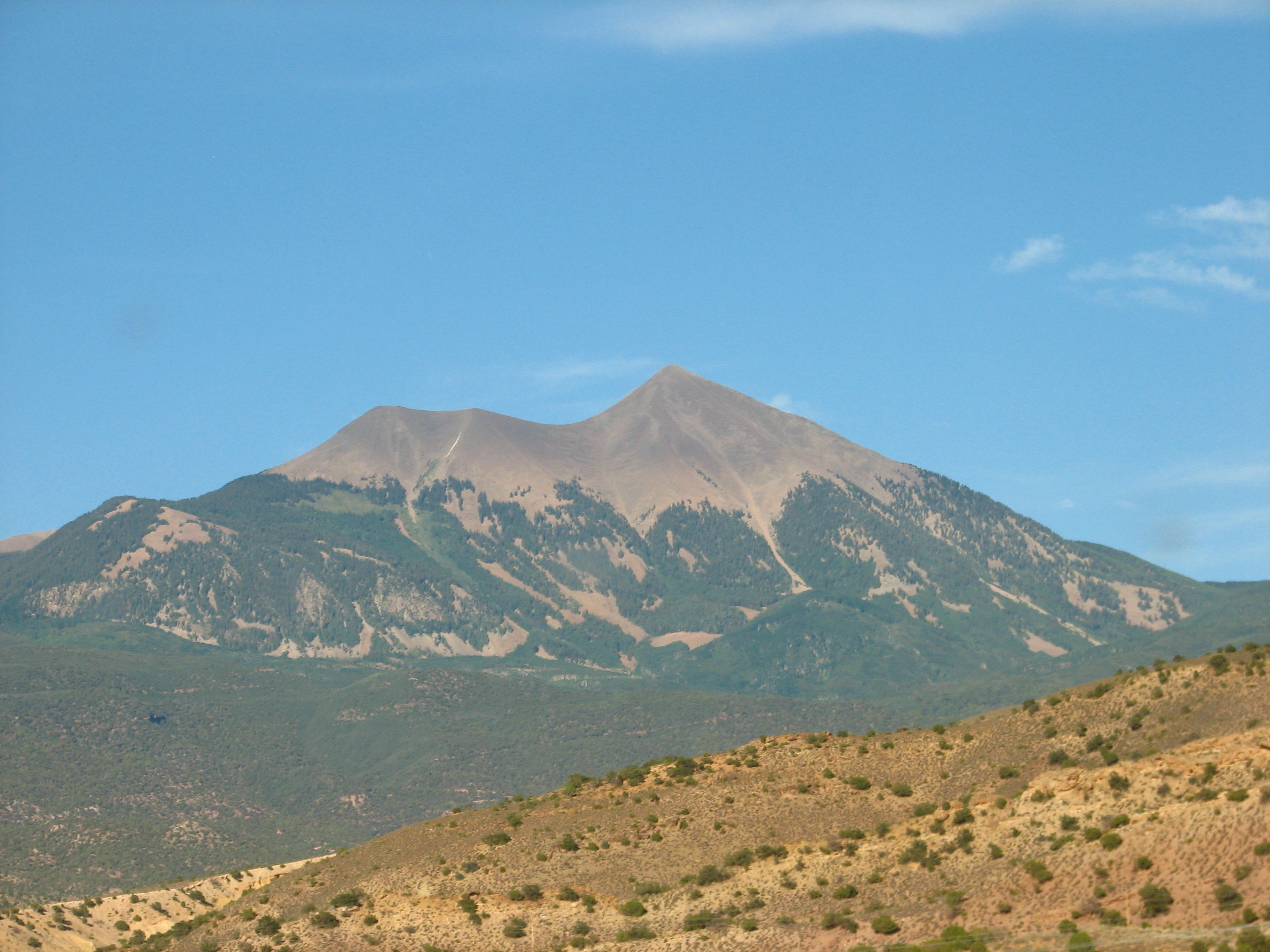
Little Tuk (left) and Mt. Tukuhnikivatz in summer.

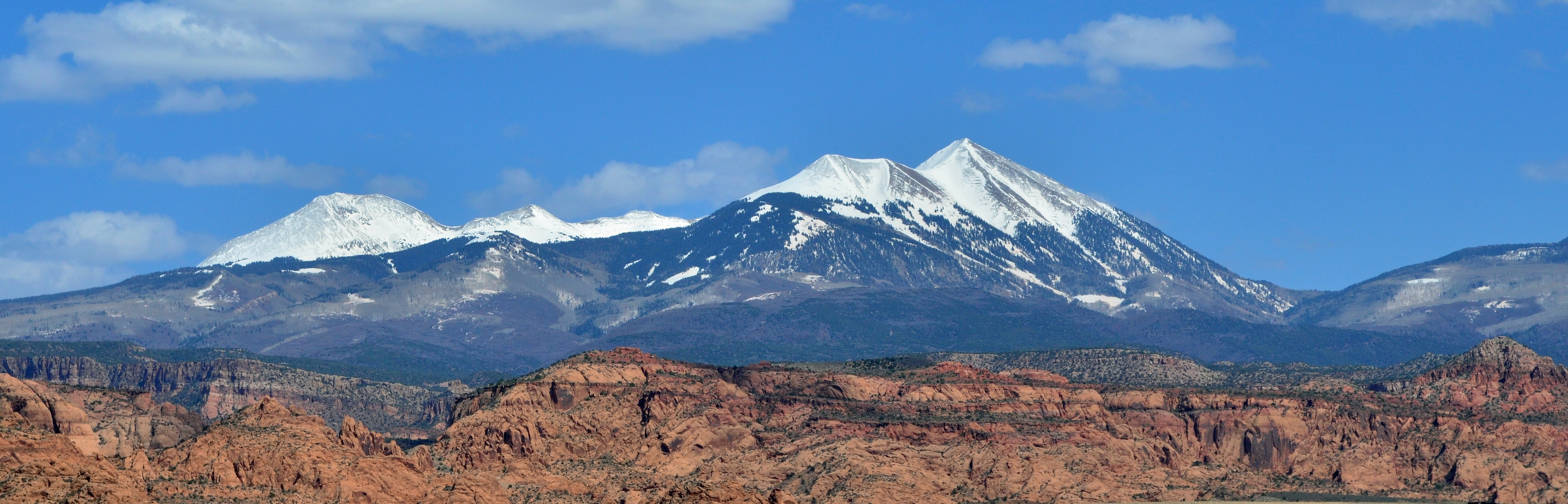
Mt. Tukuhnikivatz, with Mt. Mellenthin to the left

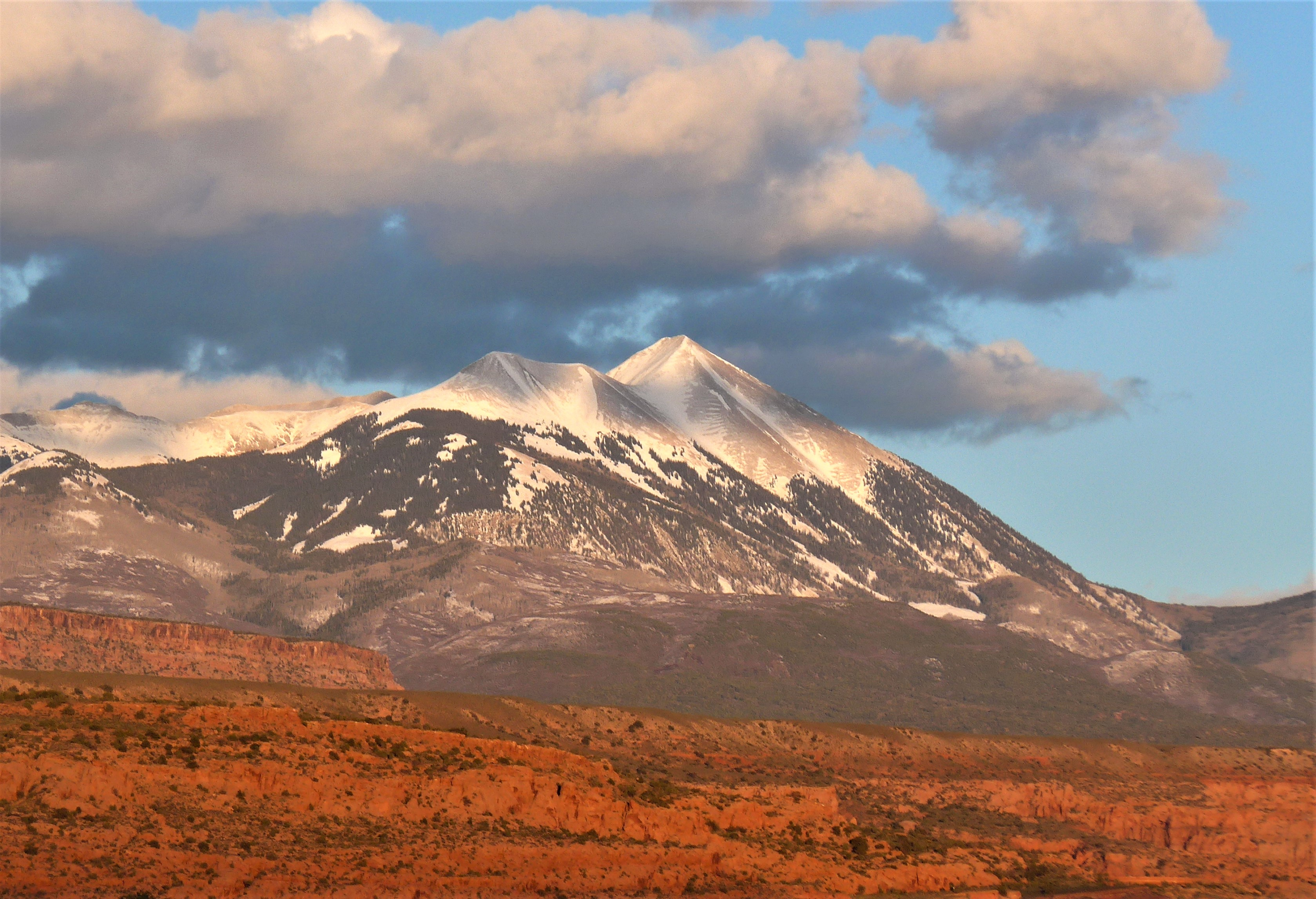
Tukuhnikivatz at sunset

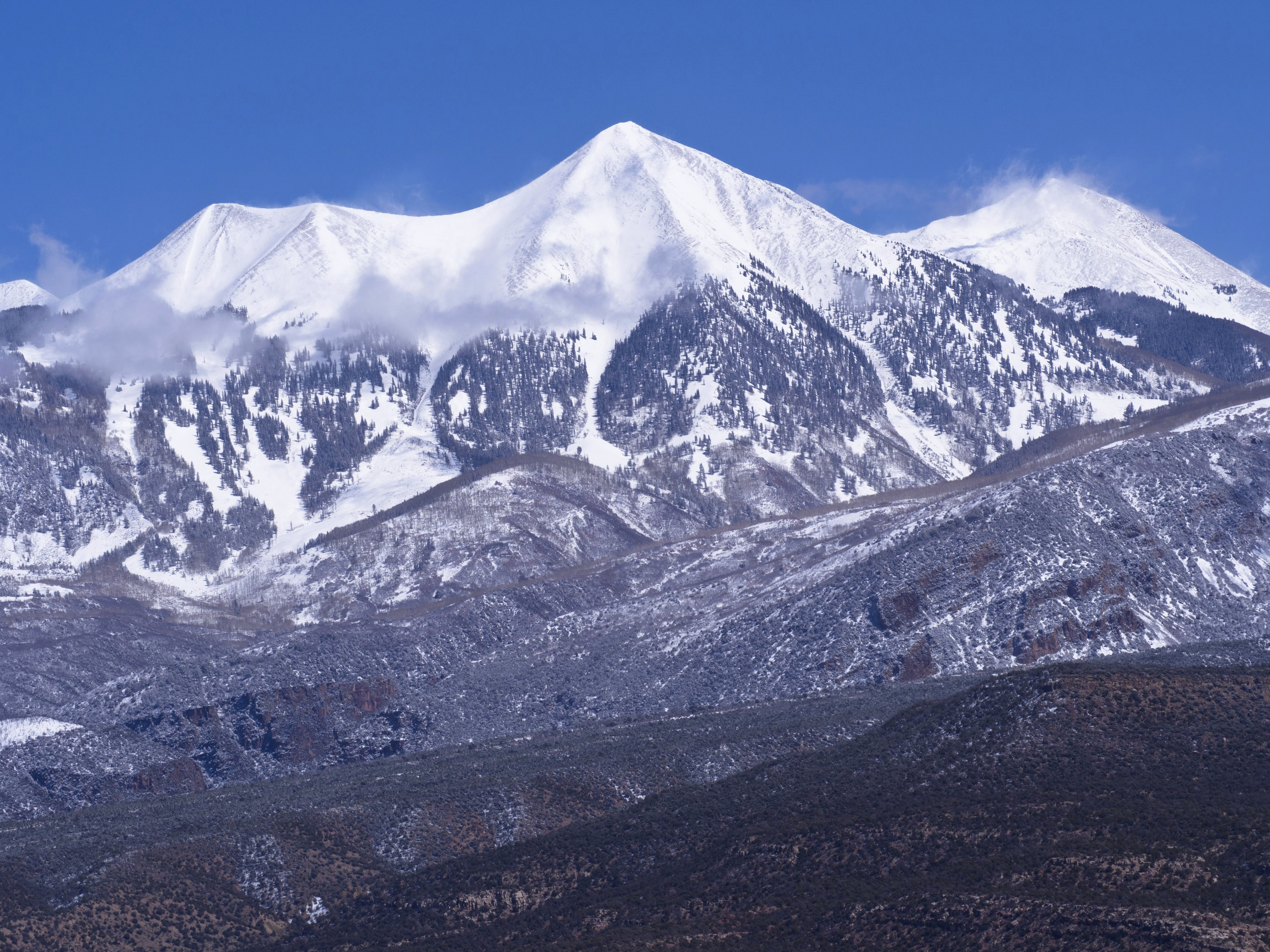
Mt. Tukuhnikivatz (Mt. Peale to right)

== See also ==
- List of mountain peaks of Utah
- Colorado Plateau
