= Mount Waas =

Mountain in the American state of Utah

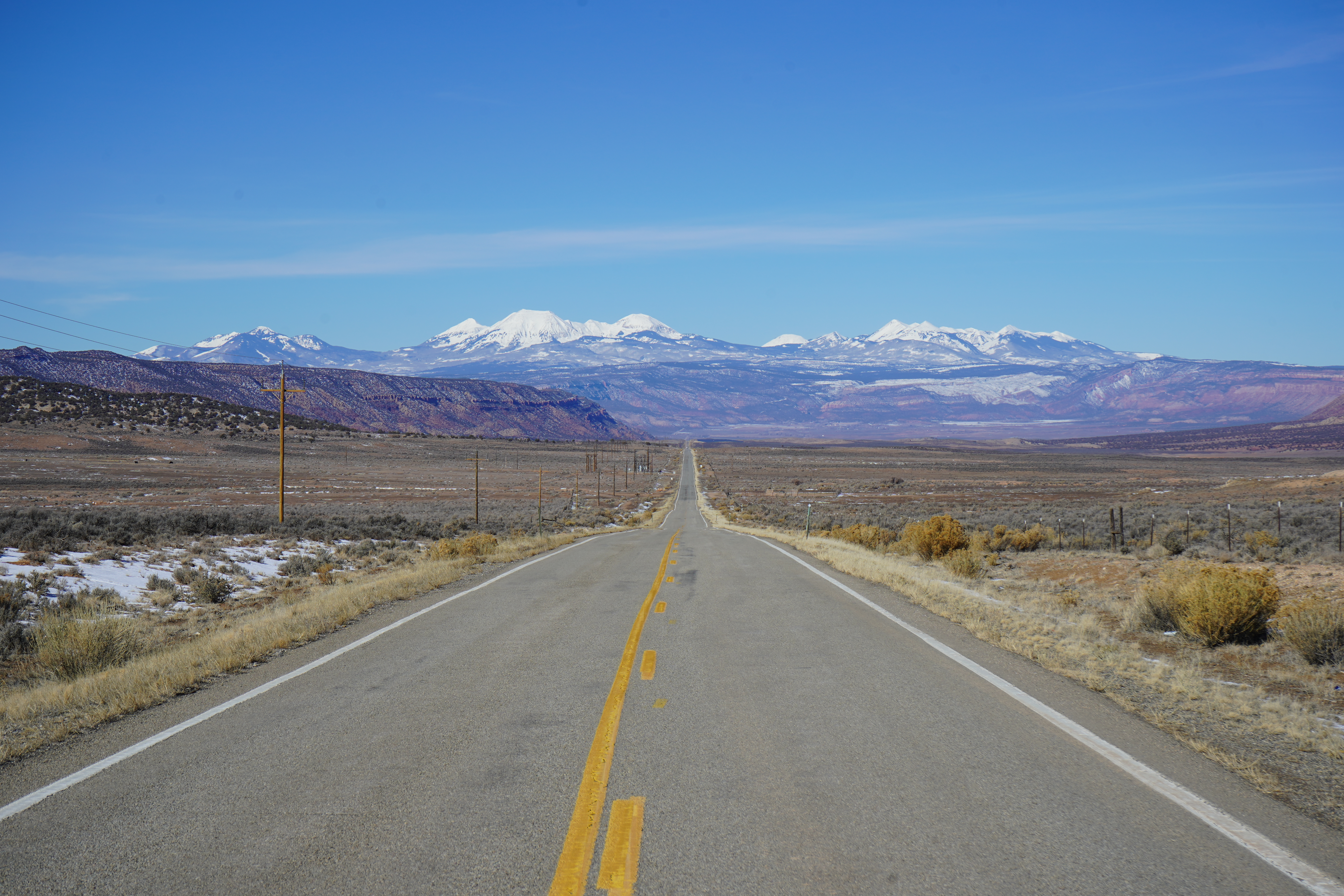
- view from Colorado State Highway 90, January 2019

Highest point
- Elevation: 12,306 ft (3,751 m)
- Prominence: 1,793 ft (547 m)
- Isolation: 5.17 mi (8.32 km)
- Coordinates: 38°32′21″N 109°13′39″W

Geography
- Location within Utah
- Location: Grand County, Utah
- Parent range: La Sal Mountains

Mount Waas is a peak in Grand County, Utah in the United States. It is the highest point of Grand County and is part of the La Sal Mountains.

== See also ==
- List of mountain peaks of Utah
