= Mount Peale =

Mountain in Utah, United States

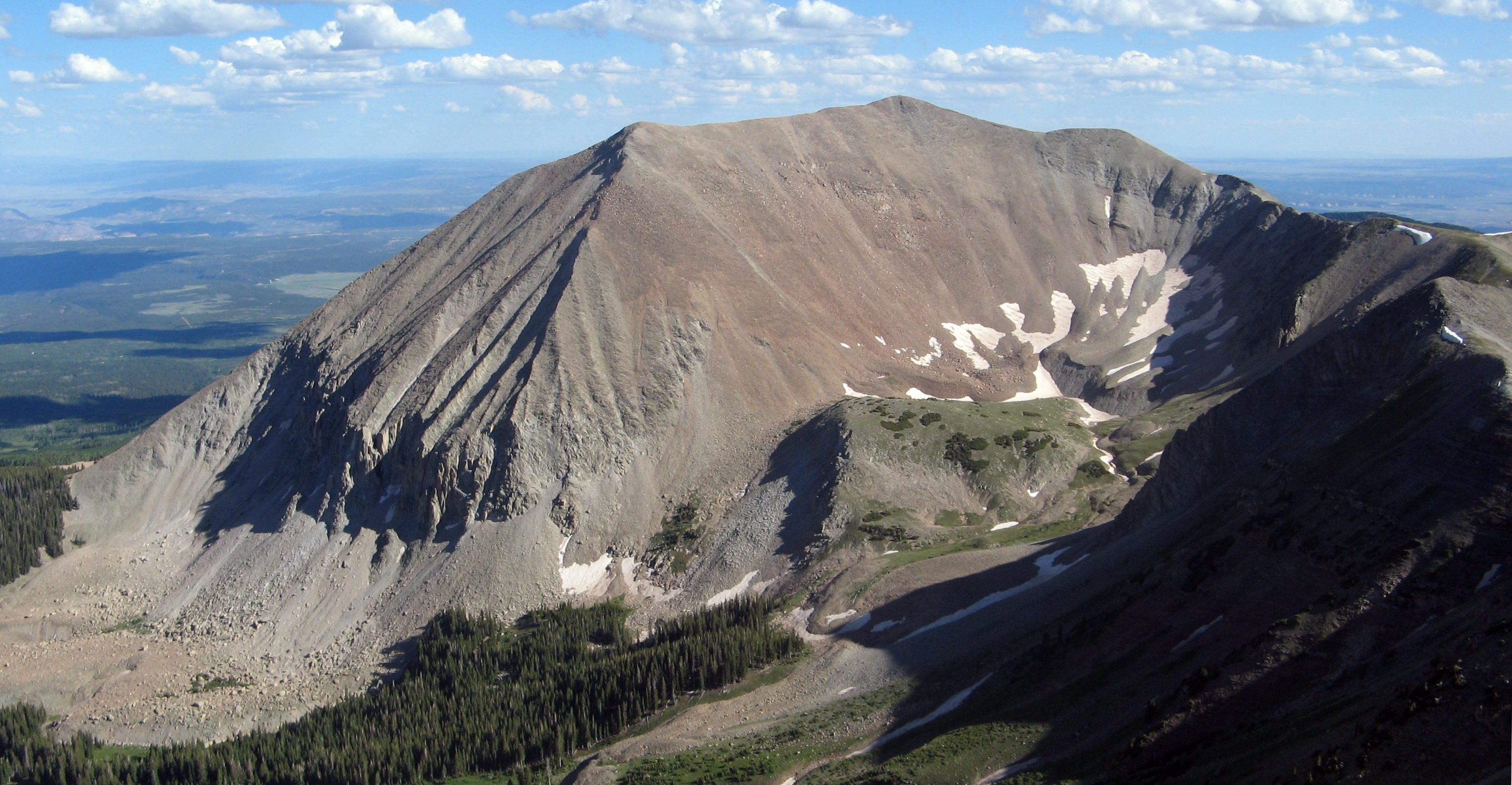
- The north face of Mount Peale, as seen from the summit of Mount Mellenthin

Highest point
- Elevation: 12,726 ft (3,879 m) NAVD 88
- Prominence: 6,161 ft (1,878 m)
- Listing: US most prominent peaks 56th; Utah County High Points 3rd
- Coordinates: 38°26′18″N 109°13′45″W

Geography
- Location within Utah
- Location: San Juan County, Utah, U.S.
- Parent range: La Sal Mountains
- Topo map: USGS Mount Peale (UT)

Climbing
- Easiest route: La Sal Pass Route: 2.5 mile hike/scramble

Mount Peale is the highest point in the La Sal Mountains of San Juan County, in the southeastern part of Utah, United States. It is also the highest point in Utah outside the Uinta Mountains. It is located about 20 mi (32 km) southeast of Moab. The summit is the highest point in the Manti-La Sal National Forest and the Mount Peale Research Natural Area. Mount Peale was named for Albert Peale, a mineralogist on the Hayden Survey of 1875.

The La Sal Mountains sit on the arid Colorado Plateau, near such famous desert landmarks as Canyonlands National Park and Arches National Park. However, due to their height, the La Sals are heavily forested and usually snow-capped until early summer (there is one snowfield on the north side that usually lasts year round). Mount Peale can be seen on a clear day from the Wasatch Plateau of central Utah, near Orangeville, over 115 miles (190 km) away.

Mount Peale can be accessed from various directions, but is most commonly climbed from the area of La Sal Pass, 10,125 ft (3,086 m), about 3 mi (5 km) to the southwest of the peak. La Sal Pass is accessed from the southeast via a graded gravel road. From the pass, the summit is obtained by a short but steep off-trail hike of about 2.5 mi (4.0 km) with about 2,600 ft (800 m) of elevation gain. The route often involves some travel on snow, even in summer.

== Climate ==
Mount Peale has an alpine dry-summer subarctic climate (Dsc) with cold, snowy winters with temperatures under freezing all day, and mild and moderately rainy summers with cool nights. The large amount of rain for Utah, as well as the cold overall temperatures are a result of the mountain's altitude of over 12000 ft. Due to the cold climate, temperatures aren't consistently above freezing until July, and snow often remains on the mountain until then.

Climate data for Mount Peale 38.4436 N, 109.2271 W, Elevation: 12,093 ft (3,686 m) (1991–2020 normals)
| Month | Jan | Feb | Mar | Apr | May | Jun | Jul | Aug | Sep | Oct | Nov | Dec | Year |
|---|---|---|---|---|---|---|---|---|---|---|---|---|---|
| Mean daily maximum °F (°C) | 27.4 (−2.6) | 26.7 (−2.9) | 31.9 (−0.1) | 37.8 (3.2) | 46.9 (8.3) | 59.0 (15.0) | 64.7 (18.2) | 62.5 (16.9) | 54.9 (12.7) | 43.7 (6.5) | 33.3 (0.7) | 27.2 (−2.7) | 43.0 (6.1) |
| Daily mean °F (°C) | 16.2 (−8.8) | 15.4 (−9.2) | 20.1 (−6.6) | 25.2 (−3.8) | 34.0 (1.1) | 45.0 (7.2) | 51.2 (10.7) | 49.5 (9.7) | 42.4 (5.8) | 32.1 (0.1) | 22.7 (−5.2) | 16.4 (−8.7) | 30.9 (−0.6) |
| Mean daily minimum °F (°C) | 5.1 (−14.9) | 4.2 (−15.4) | 8.3 (−13.2) | 12.6 (−10.8) | 21.2 (−6.0) | 31.1 (−0.5) | 37.7 (3.2) | 36.5 (2.5) | 29.9 (−1.2) | 20.5 (−6.4) | 12.1 (−11.1) | 5.6 (−14.7) | 18.7 (−7.4) |
| Average precipitation inches (mm) | 4.16 (106) | 4.26 (108) | 5.12 (130) | 4.31 (109) | 2.93 (74) | 1.31 (33) | 2.28 (58) | 2.65 (67) | 3.42 (87) | 3.72 (94) | 3.74 (95) | 4.15 (105) | 42.05 (1,066) |
Source: PRISM Climate Group

== See also ==
- List of Ultras of the United States
