= Heckscherville, Pennsylvania =

Unincorporated community in Pennsylvania, US

Heckscherville
- Census-designated place
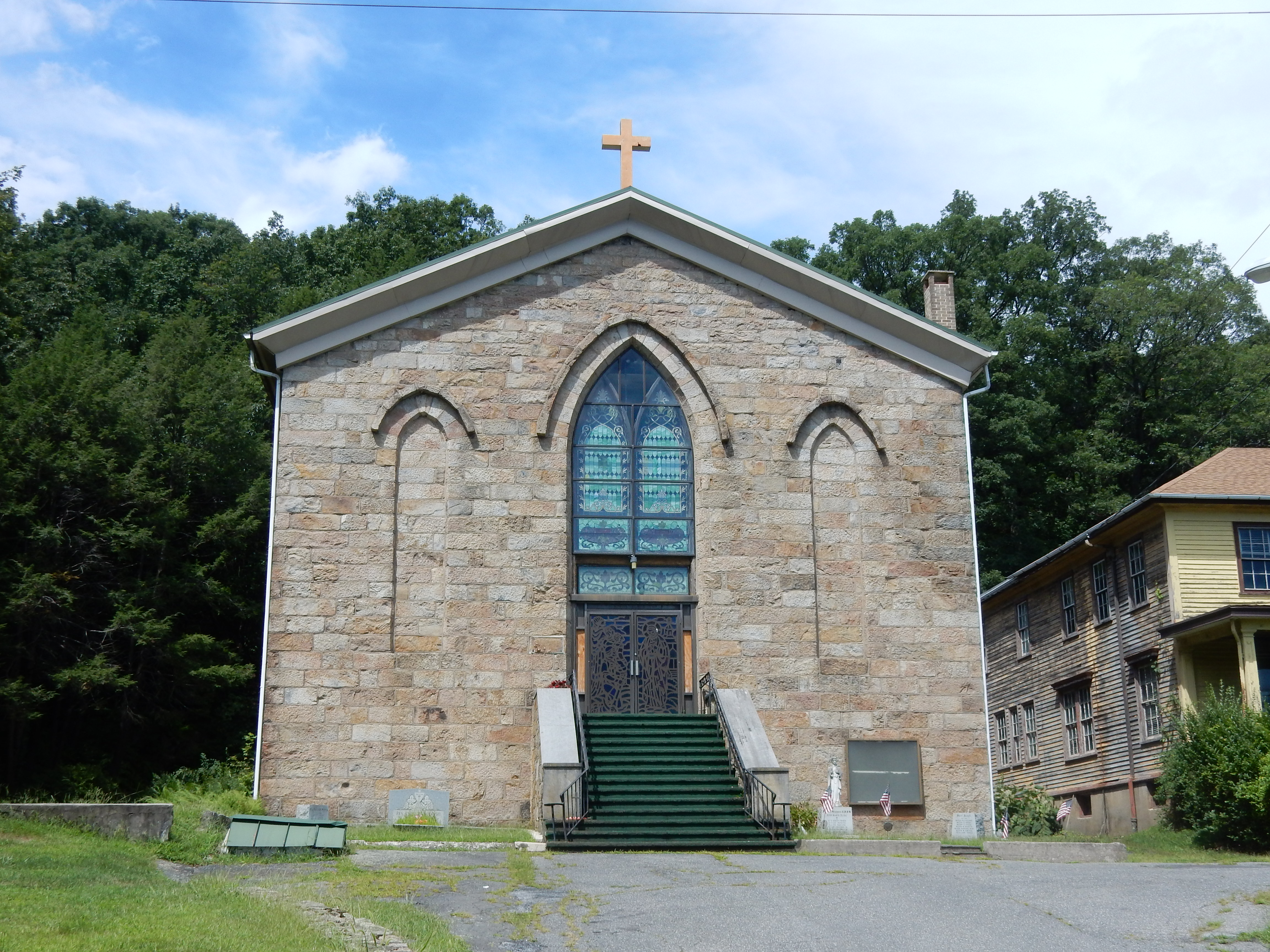
- St. Kierans Church in Heckscherville

- Location within the U.S. state of Pennsylvania
- Coordinates: 40°43′15″N 76°15′59″W
- Country: United States
- State: Pennsylvania
- County: Schuylkill

Area
  - Total: 0.33 sq mi (0.86 km^{2})
  - Land: 0.33 sq mi (0.86 km^{2})
  - Water: 0 sq mi (0.00 km^{2})

Population (2020)
  - Total: 196
  - Density: 591.2/sq mi (228.27/km^{2})
- Time zone: UTC-5 (Eastern (EST))
  - Summer (DST): UTC-4 (EDT)
- ZIP codes: 17901
- FIPS code: 42-33528

Heckscherville is a census-designated place (CDP) in Schuylkill County, Pennsylvania, United States. The population was 196 at the 2020 census.

== Geography ==
Heckscherville is located at 40°43′15″N 76°15′59″W (40.720951, -76.266458).

According to the United States Census Bureau, the CDP has a total area of 0.2 square miles (0.52 km^{2}), all land.

Heckscherville Valley includes all of Foster Township, a small portion of New Castle Township and a large part of Cass Township. The Valley is situated between Broad Mountain on the north and the Thomaston / Mine Hill on the west. It is composed of the following villages: Greenbury, Coal Castle, Kanes Hollow, Pine Knot, Cherry Valley, Heckscherville, Upper and Lower Glen Carbon, Courtneys, Upper and Lower Buck Run and Rohersvilla. Kear's Hill and Green Hill are settlements that once existed in the valley, but have now disappeared to make way for advanced coal production.

== Demographics ==
Historical population
| Census | Pop. | Note | %± |
|---|---|---|---|
| 2020 | 196 | | — |
U.S. Decennial Census

As of the 2000 census, there were 76 people, 36 households, and 23 families residing in the CDP. The population density was 450.9 inhabitants per square mile (174.1/km^{2}). There were 44 housing units at an average density of 261.1 per square mile (100.8/km^{2}). The racial makeup of the CDP was 100.00% White.

There were 36 households, out of which 16.7% had children under the age of 18 living with them, 38.9% were married couples living together, 16.7% had a female householder with no husband present, and 36.1% were non-families. 27.8% of all households were made up of individuals, and 16.7% had someone living alone who was 65 years of age or older. The average household size was 2.11 and the average family size was 2.57.

In the CDP, the population was spread out, with 14.5% under the age of 18, 2.6% from 18 to 24, 22.4% from 25 to 44, 28.9% from 45 to 64, and 31.6% who were 65 years of age or older. The median age was 54 years. For every 100 females, there were 100.0 males. For every 100 females age 18 and over, there were 75.7 males.

The median income for a household in the CDP was $35,625, and the median income for a family was $41,250. Males had a median income of $28,750 versus $15,625 for females. The per capita income for the CDP was $18,577. There were 20.0% of families and 28.2% of the population living below the poverty line, including 90.0% of under eighteens and 14.3% of those over 64.

== History ==
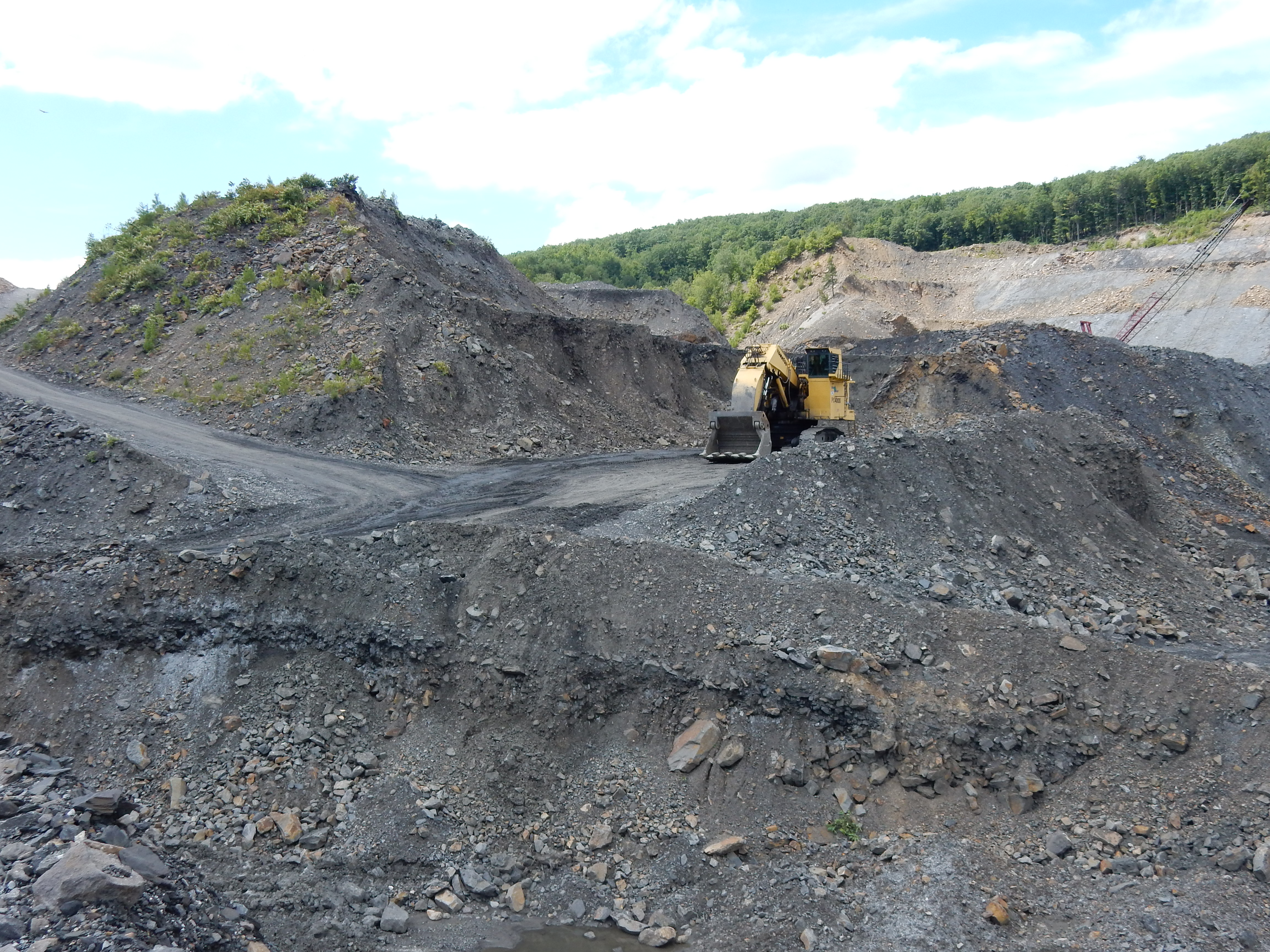
Coal mining near Heckscherville

The earliest available history shows that in 1831 the entire Heckscherville valley contained only two villages. At this time the valley was called “Chapmanville” after the owners of the coal mines. In 1843 the Chapmanville interests were taken over by George and William Payne. Subsequently, the valley's name was changed to “Payne’s Patch”.

With coal sales increasing, the Payne brothers found it necessary to secure additional laborers. Taking advantage of the famine in Ireland in 1845, they traveled to Ireland to persuade hundreds of families and individuals to move to America. The Payne brothers focused on the Queens and Kilkenny counties, and provided transportation, employment and homes to those who agreed to move. Before the brothers returned to Payne's Patch, the valley was populated almost entirely by Welsh with only a few scattered Irish families. However, when they did return with the Irish immigrants, the Welsh started to migrate elsewhere and the population changed to mostly Irish. This influx of immigrants continued until almost the entire population was either Irish or of Irish descent. Because of this, the small valley then became known as the “Irish Valley”.

The August Heckscher family from New York acquired the Payne brothers holding, and changed the name to Heckscherville.

Years later the population began to undergo another change. The coal companies, due to a manpower shortage, began to bring into the region laborers from various countries in Europe. Nationalities included: Polish, Lithuanians, Slavs, and Greeks. Today nearly every nationality is represented in the eight miles of the Heckscherville Valley.

== Education ==
The school district is Minersville Area School District.

== Irish Festival ==
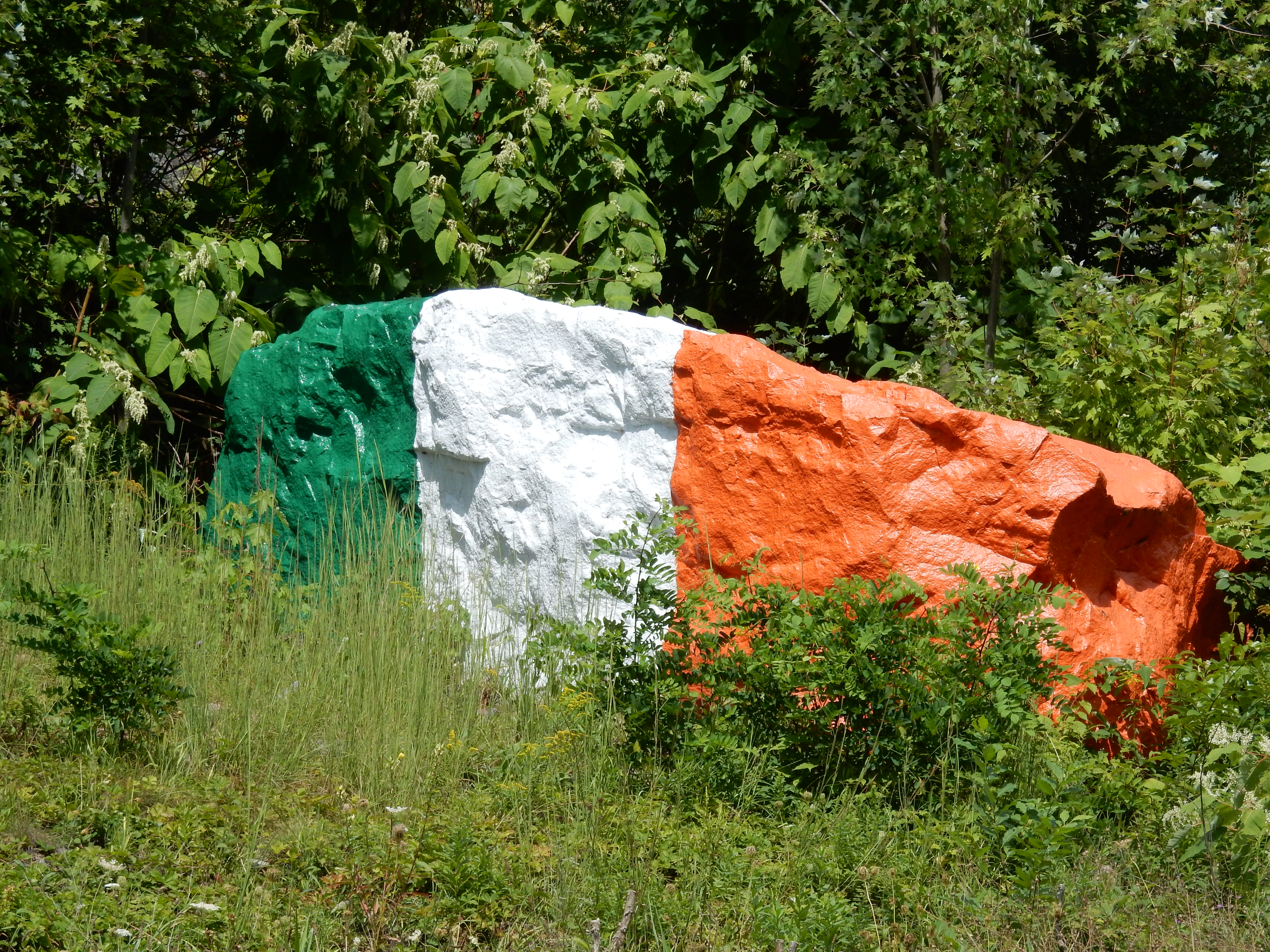
Stone along Valley Rd. near Heckscherville

Heckscherville hosted an annual "Irish Festival", beginning in 1987 until 2010. This festival celebrated the settlement's Irish heritage, and was the main fundraiser for the village's Clover Fire Company. The members of the volunteer fire company and village residents were the main coordinators of the event. Before his death in 2001, Joseph Callaghan was the main coordinator and chairman of the Irish Festival. During this time, it was considered one of the best Irish Festivals on the east coast. Local hotels would often be completely booked during the weekend of the festival, with people coming from as far as Anchorage, Alaska.

The festival was also known as "Irish Weekend"; it featured aspects of Irish culture from food to family. A wide assortment of food vendors provided Irish comfort foods, including Irish stew, potato pancakes, soda bread, scones, and colcannon (a mixture of cabbage, onions, turnips, mashed potatoes). Irish music was also an integral part of the festival. It has been the launching pad for one Philadelphia based band Blackthorne. Other acts who have performed during the festival include The Molly Wogs, Ceann, The Martin Family, The Irish Lads and Irishtown Road. In addition to the stage bands, other entertainment includes storytelling, Irish plays and Irish dancing.

== Saint Kierans Church ==
Saint Keirans is a Roman Catholic church in Heckscherville. It is the sole church in the town and was built by Irish miners in the 1850s under the direction of John Neumann. Neumann was the first United States Bishop to be made a saint. St. Kieran's is the only church whose construction the Bishop personally oversaw, traveling to the valley on three occasions to oversee the work. Architecturally designed after the tiny country church at Knock, Ireland (which became famous in 1879 due to an apparition of Our Lady of Knock), St. Kieran's was rumored to be one of Bishop Neumann's favored parishes. The little church was named after a parish in Kilkenny, Ireland, the home country of several of the congregation's parishioners.

St. Kieran's Church was closed in June 2008, a casualty in the widespread restructuring and consolidation of Roman Catholic churches currently underway in America. Currently there is a group of individuals working to preserve the Church. This group is known as "The Friends of St. Kierans".
