= La Sal Mountains =

Mountain range in Utah, United States

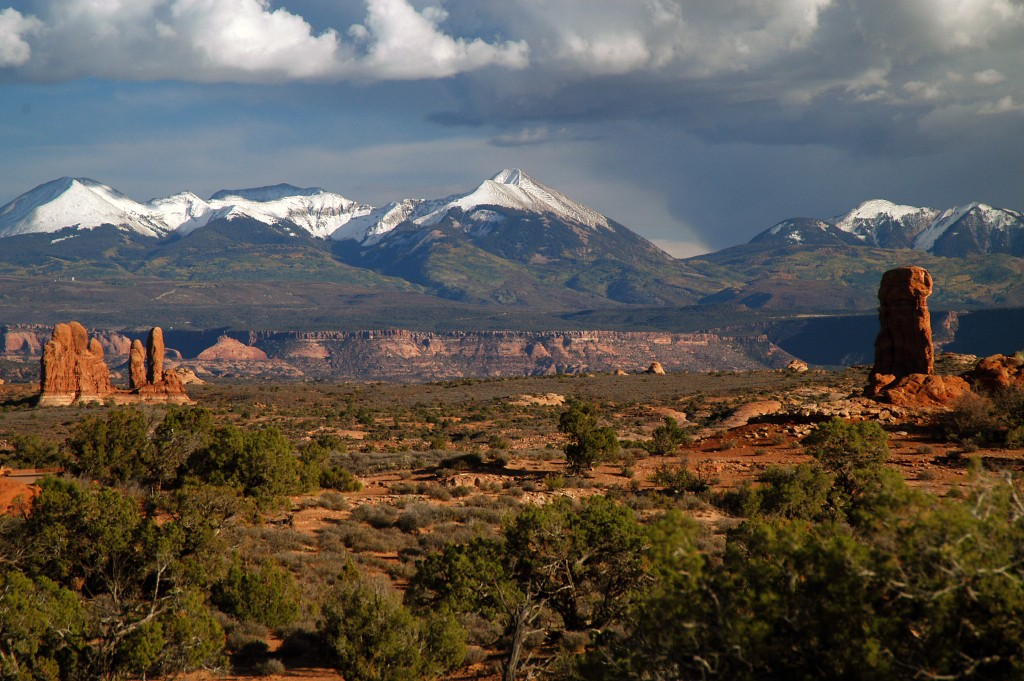
- La Sal Mountains as seen from Arches National Park

Highest point
- Peak: Mount Peale
- Elevation: 12,721 ft (3,877 m)
- Coordinates: 38°26′19″N 109°13′45″W

Geography
- Location within Utah
- Country: United States
- State: Utah
- Range coordinates: 38°26′56″N 109°14′28″W
- Parent range: Rocky Mountains

The La Sal Mountains or La Sal Range is a mountain range located in Grand and San Juan counties in the U.S. state of Utah, along the border with Colorado. The range rises above and southeast of Moab and north of the town of La Sal. This range is part of the Manti-La Sal National Forest and the southern Rocky Mountains. The maximum elevation is at Mount Peale, reaching 12,721 feet (3,877 m) above sea level.

The range contains three clusters of peaks separated by passes. The peaks span a distance of about 10 miles (16 km). The name of the range dates to Spanish times, when the Sierra La Sal (meaning the "Salt Mountains") was a prominent landmark on the Old Spanish Trail between Santa Fe and Los Angeles.

== Geology ==
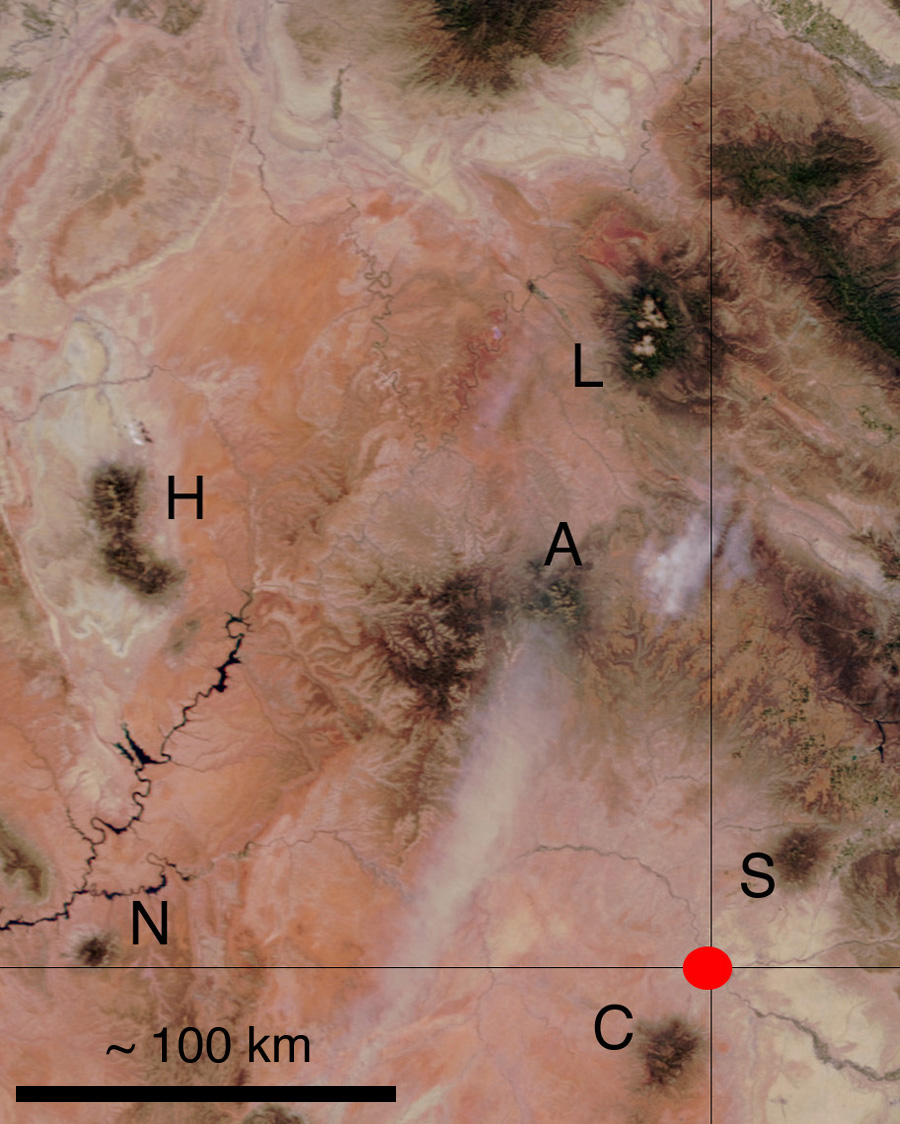
Mountain ranges associated with laccoliths and other igneous intrusions on part of the Colorado Plateau. The red dot marks the Four Corners, the intersection of Utah, Colorado, New Mexico, and Arizona. L, La Sal Mountains; A, Abajo Mountains; S, (Sleeping) Ute Mountain; C, Carrizo Mountains; N, Navajo Mountain; H, Henry Mountains.

The range formed due to intrusion of igneous rocks and subsequent erosion of the surrounding less-resistant sedimentary rocks. The most abundant igneous rocks are porphyritic, with phenocrysts of hornblende and plagioclase: these rocks are called diorite in some accounts, but trachyte in at least one other source. Syenite, some containing the unusual mineral nosean, makes up a few percent of the igneous rocks present. Some igneous intrusions have the shapes of laccoliths. The ages of these igneous rocks fall between 25 and 28 million years. The magmas were emplaced into sedimentary rocks with ages from Permian to Cretaceous.

The La Sal Mountains rise high over the surrounding Colorado Plateau. Two other ranges on the Plateau, the Abajo Mountains and the Henry Mountains, formed around igneous intrusions of about the same age. Yet other nearby ranges, such as the Carrizo Mountains and Ute Mountain, formed about otherwise similar intrusions emplaced about 70 million years ago. The formation of these igneous rocks in two distinct time intervals has attracted the interest of scientists seeking explanations for magma production below relatively stable parts of the Earth's crust.

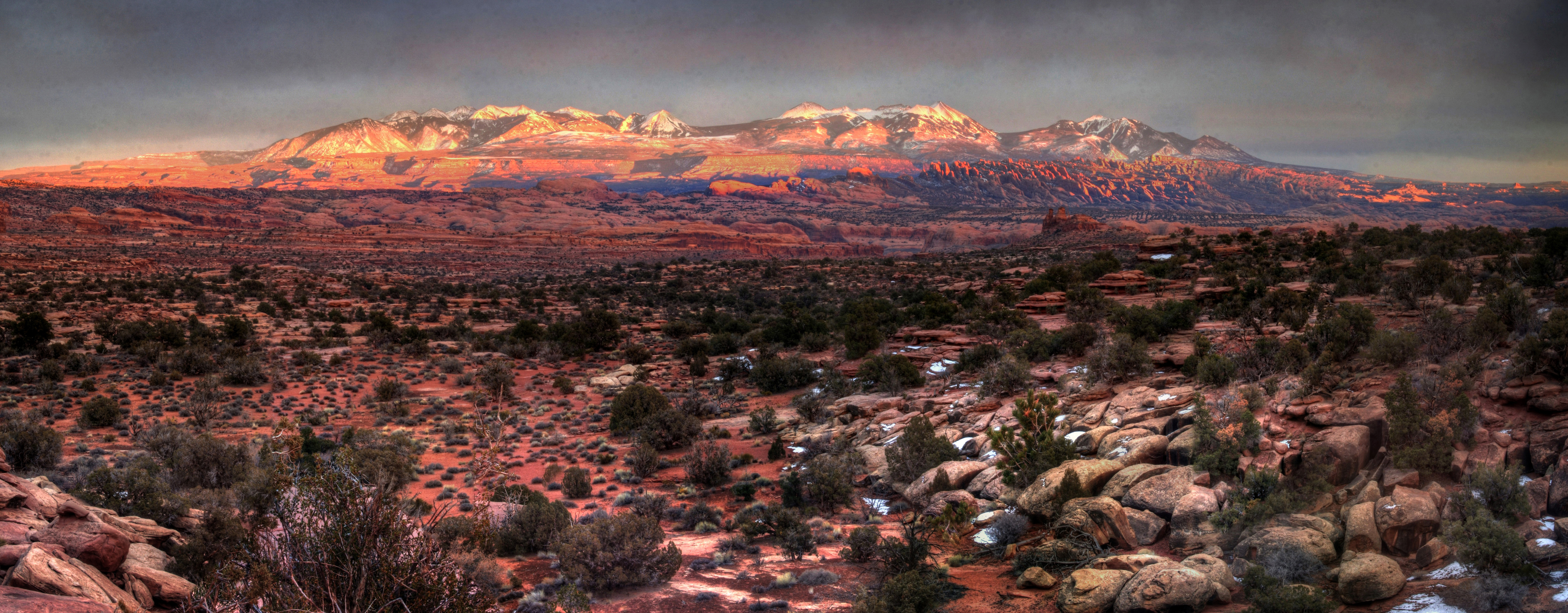
The La Sals at Sunset from Gemini Bridges Road

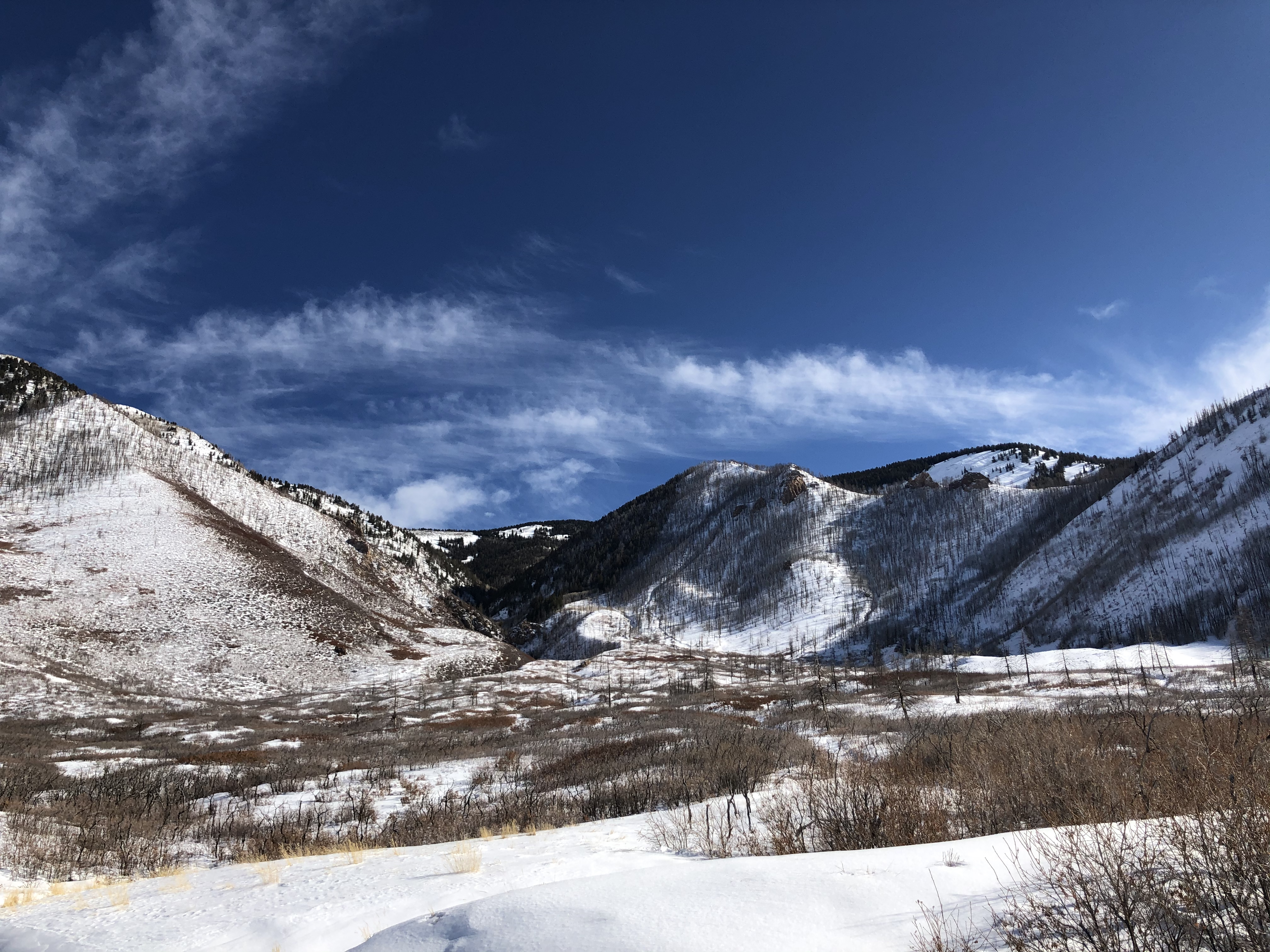
View of Horse Mountain in winter, looking to the east on La Sal Loop Road, in Pinhook Valley, Utah

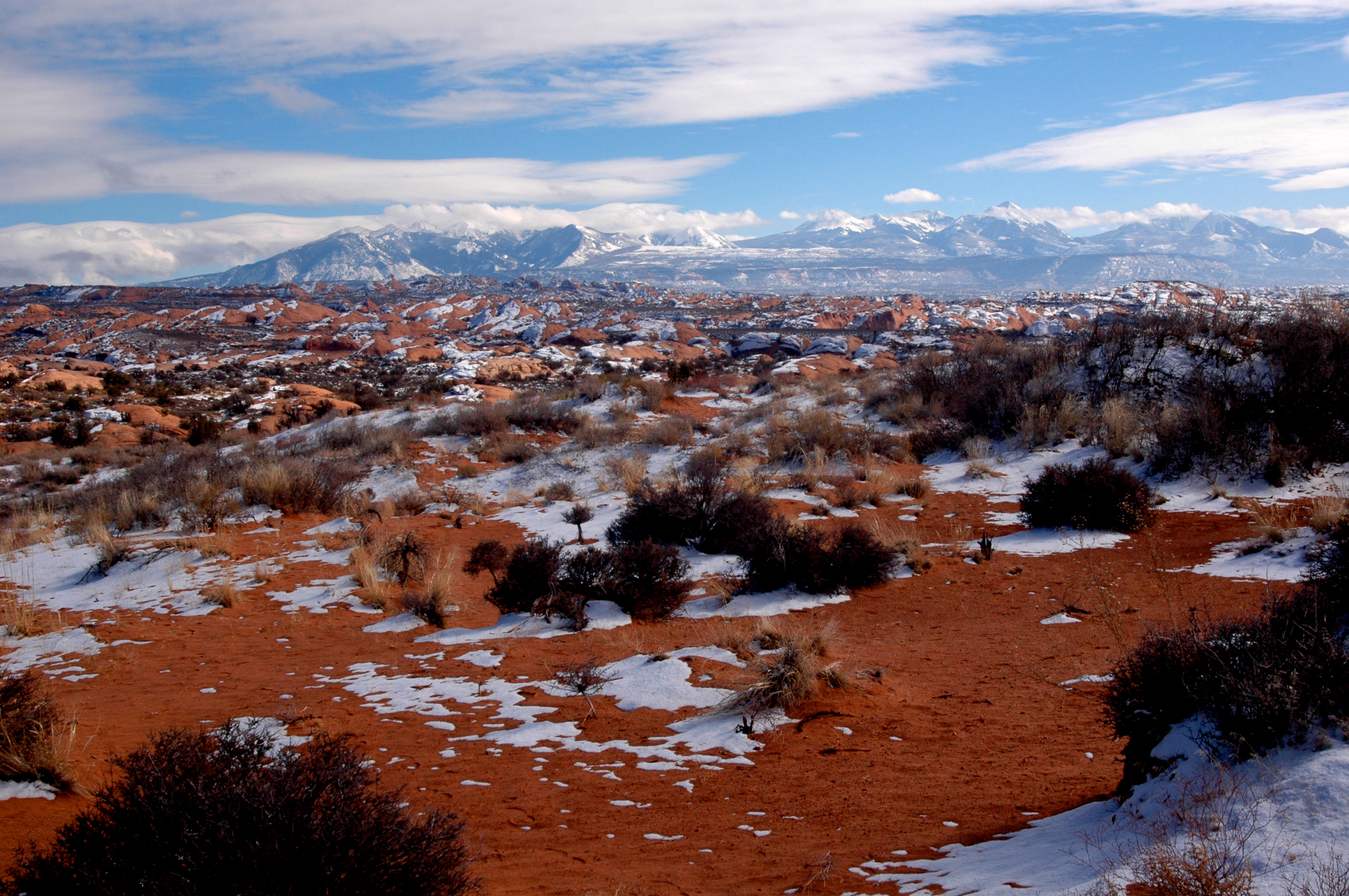
View of the La Sal mountains from the entrance to Arches National Park

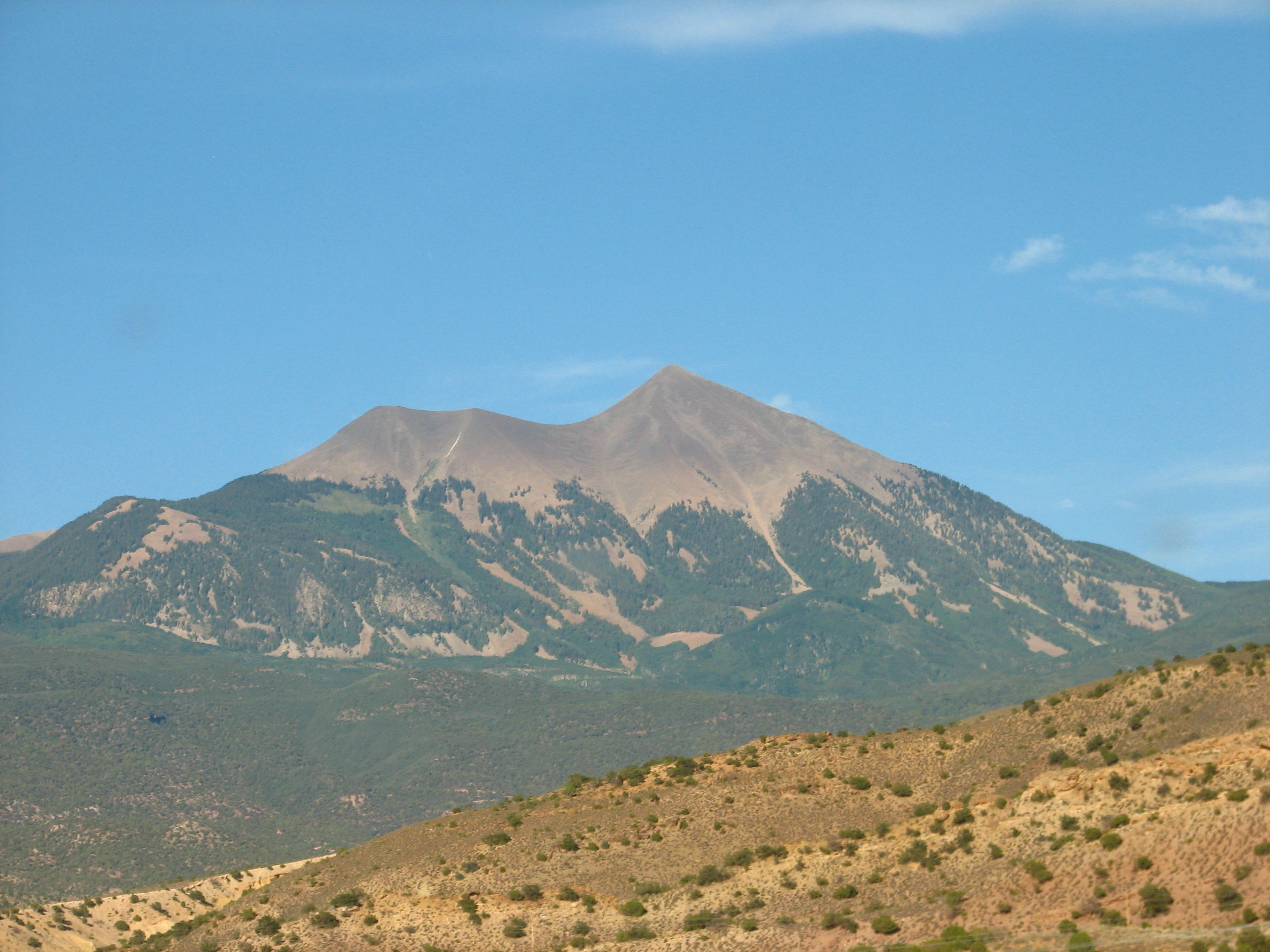
Little Tuk (left) and Mt. Tukuhnikivatz (right) of the La Sal Range in summer, seen from the south.

== Peaks of the La Sal Mountains ==
The significant peaks of the La Sal Mountains are:
| peak name | feet/meter |
|---|---|
| Mount Peale | 12,721 feet (3,877 m) |
| Mount Mellenthin | 12,645 feet (3,854 m) |
| Mount Tukuhnikivatz | 12,482 feet (3,805 m) |
| Mount Waas | 12,331 feet (3,758 m) |
| Manns Peak | 12,272 feet (3,741 m) |
| Mount Laurel | 12,271 feet (3,740 m) |
| Mount Tomasaki | 12,239 feet (3,730 m) |
| Pilot Mountain | 12,200 feet (3,719 m) |
| Green Mountain | 12,163 feet (3,707 m) |
| Little Tuk | 12,048 feet (3,672 m) |
| Castle Peak | 12,044 feet (3,671 m) |
| La Sal Peak | 12,001 feet (3,658 m) |

== See also ==
- Geyser Pass
