= Peel =

Peel or peeling may refer to:

- Peel (fruit), also called skin or rind
- Peeling of animal skin, also called moulting
- Peeling of human skin, also called desquamation, such as from a sunburn
- Chemical peel, treatment that uses a chemical solution to remove the outer layer of dead skin
- Peel (tool), a long-handled object used in baking

== Places and transportation ==
- Peel County (disambiguation)
- Peel Hall (disambiguation)
- Peel Island (disambiguation)
- Peel Park (disambiguation)
- Peel Street (disambiguation)

=== Australia ===
- Peel, New South Wales
- Peel River (New South Wales)
- Peel (Western Australia)

=== Canada ===
- Peel, New Brunswick, an unincorporated community in Peel Parish
- Peel Parish, New Brunswick
- Peel River (Canada), tributary of the Mackenzie River
- Peel Sound, Nunavut
- Regional Municipality of Peel, Ontario (Peel County until 1973)
  - Peel (federal electoral district)
  - Peel (provincial electoral district)
- Peel station (Montreal Metro), Montreal, Quebec, Canada

=== British Isles ===
==== United Kingdom ====
- Peel Fell, a hill in Kielder Forest
- Peels, Northumberland, in Harbottle
- The Peel Group or Peel Holdings, UK property company, especially infrastructure, owner of several "Peel Centres"
- Peel Hotels, UK hotel company
- Peel Hall tram stop, Manchester, England

==== Isle of Man ====
- Peel, Isle of Man
  - Peel railway station (Isle of Man)
  - Peel Road railway station
  - Peel Engineering Company, Manx boat and car manufacturer

=== United States ===
- Peel, Arkansas
- Peel, Oregon

=== Elsewhere ===
- Peel, Netherlands

== Arts and entertainment ==
- Peel (California band), a US band active from 1999 to 2001 formed by Kevin Ridel from Los Angeles, California
- Peel (Texas band), indie rock band from Austin, Texas
- Peel (1982 film), an Australian short film directed by Jane Campion
- Peel (2019 film), a British comedy-drama starring Emile Hirsch
- See also Peel Sessions (disambiguation)

== Electronics and computing ==
- Peel Technologies, makers of the Peel Smart Remote, an Android and iOS app to control TV and other home devices
- PEEL, programmable electrically erasable logic, variant of the GAL (generic array logic)
- Peel (software), Mac application for listening to songs from MP3 blogs
- Bitrate peeling, Ogg Vorbis technique for changing the bitrate of an audio stream

== People, government, and military ==
- Peel (surname)
- Peel baronets, three separate British baronetcies
- Earl Peel, title in the British peerage
- Governor Peel (disambiguation)
- Peel ministry (disambiguation)
- Peel Commission, Royal Commission of Inquiry into Palestine, 1936–1937
- Peel tower, a fortified keep or watchtower
- Peel (tactic), an infantry retreat technique

== Sports ==
- Peel A.F.C., an association football club (soccer team) from Peel, Isle of Man
- Peel, an action in croquet
- Peel Thunder Football Club, an Australian rules football club

== See also ==
- Peeler (disambiguation)
- Orange Peel (disambiguation)
- Dufferin-Peel (disambiguation)
- Peal (disambiguation)
- Peale (disambiguation)
- Peele (disambiguation)
- Piel (disambiguation)
- Piele
- Appeal (disambiguation)
