= Peel (surname) =

Peel is a surname, and may refer to:

- Alan Peel (1908–1992), Australian rules footballer
- Alfredo Peel, Argentine footballer
- Andrée Peel (1905–2010), a member of the French Resistance during the Second World War
- Ann Peel (born 1961), Canadian race walker
- Arthur Peel, 1st Viscount Peel (1829–1912), British politician
- Arthur Peel, 2nd Earl Peel (1901–1969), British peer
- Arthur Peel (diplomat) (1861–1952), British diplomat
- Ben Peel (born 1983/4), Northern Irish actor
- Bertram Peel (1881–1945), English cricketer
- Bobby Peel (1857–1941), English cricketer
- Brandon Peel (born 1994), American basketball player
- Carole Doyle Peel (1934–2016), American visual artist
- Charles Lennox Peel (1823–1899), British civil servant, son of Laurence Peel
- Cheryle Peel (born 1976), British judoka
- Clifford Peel (1894–1918), Australian World War I pilot
- Constance Peel (1868–1934), English journalist and writer
- David Peel (actor) (1920–1981), British film actor
- David Peel (musician) (1942–2017), New York underground rock musician
- Debbie Peel (born 1958), English athlete
- Lady Delia Peel (1889–1981), English courtier
- Denis Peel (1886–1927), English cricketer
- Dolly Peel (1782–1857), English fishwife
- Dwayne Peel (born 1981), Welsh rugby union player and coach
- Edmund Peel (1791–1850), English politician, younger brother of Prime Minister Robert Peel
- Edward Peel (born 1943), British actor
- Edward Peel (big-game fisherman) (1884–1961), British army officer, businessman and amateur sportsman
- Edwin A. Peel (1911–1992), British educational psychologist
- Emma Peel, a fictional character in the television series The Avengers
- Flora Peel (born 1996), English field hockey player
- Frederick Peel (1823–1906), British politician and railway commissioner
- George Peel (1869–1956), British Member of Parliament and writer
- Graham Peel (1877–1937), English composer
- Hannah Peel (born 1982), Northern Irish composer, producer and broadcaster
- Harry Peel (footballer) (1900–1976), English footballer
- Harry Peel (ice hockey) (1879–1944), Canadian ice hockey player
- Herbert Richard Peel (1831–1885), English cleric and cricketer
- Homer Peel (1902–1997), American baseball player
- Ian Peel (born 1958), British sport shooter
- Ian Peel (journalist) (born 1972), British music journalist
- Jack Peel (1921–1993), British trade union leader
- James Peel (1811–1906), English landscape painter
- John Peel (disambiguation), multiple people with the same name
- J. H. B. Peel (1913–1983), British writer on farming and the countryside
- J. D. Y. Peel (1941–2015), British Africanist, sociologist and historian of religion in Africa
- Jonathan Peel (1799–1879), British soldier and politician
- Julia Peel (1795–1859) wife of British Prime Minister Robert Peel
- Langford Peel (1829/31–1867), American soldier, gunman and gambler
- Laura Peel (born 1989), Australian freestyle skier
- Laurence Peel (1801–1888), British politician, younger brother of Prime Minister Robert Peel
- Lawrence Peel (judge) (1799–1884), British judge in India
- Mabel Dymond Peel (1879–1938), English codebreaker of World War I
- Marjorie Peel (1905–1987), Scottish amateur golfer
- Mark Peel (chef) (1954–2021), American chef and restaurateur
- Mark Peel (historian) (born 1959), Australian historian and academic
- Maud Peel (1843–1939), English artist
- Michael Peel, British journalist
- Michael A. Peel, American human resources professional
- Mildred Peel (1856–1920), Canadian sculptor
- Nathan Peel (born 1972), English footballer
- Nicolette Peel (1972–2023), British midwife
- Nigel Peel (1967–2016), English cricketer
- Parsley Peel (1723–1795), English industrialist
- Paul Peel (1860–1892), Canadian painter
- Peter Peel (1866–1960), United States soccer administrator
- Peter Madsen Peel (1820–1900), American blacksmith and civic leader
- Robert Peel (1788–1850), Prime Minister of the United Kingdom, Chancellor of the Exchequer and Home Secretary (credited with founding the Metropolitan Police)
- Robert Peel (historian) (1909–1992), American biographer of Mary Baker Eddy
- Robert Peel (doctor) (c.1830–1894), medical practitioner in South Australia
- Robert Peel (judge) (born 1966), British High Court judge
- Sir Robert Peel, 1st Baronet (1750–1830), English politician and industrialist
- Sir Robert Peel, 3rd Baronet (1822–1895), British politician
- Robert Peel (hotelier), founder of Peel Hotels
- Robert Francis Peel (1874–1924), English soldier and governor of Saint Helena
- Ronnie Peel (1946–2020), Australian guitarist, singer and songwriter
- Roy Peel (1896–1978), American political scientist and academic
- Samuel W. Peel (1831–1924), American lawyer, politician and jurist
- Sidney Peel (1870–1938), British soldier, financier and politician
- Stephen Peel (born 1965), British and athlete
- Themo H. Peel (born 1982), American writer, poet and graphic designer
- Thomas Peel (1793–1865), early settler of Western Australia
- Tim Peel, Canadian ice hockey referee
- Valerie Van Peel (born 1979), Belgian politician and journalist
- William Peel (Royal Navy officer) (1824–1858), recipient of the Victoria Cross in the Crimean War
- William Peel (bishop) (1854–1916), Anglican bishop in Africa
- William Peel (colonial administrator) (1875–1945), British Chief Secretary of the Federated Malay States and Governor of Hong Kong
- William Peel, 1st Earl Peel (1867–1937), British politician
- William Peel, 3rd Earl Peel (born 1947), English courtier
- William Yates Peel (1789–1858), British politician
- Yana Peel (born 1974), Canadian executive and philanthropist

== See also ==
- Peele
- Peile
- Pele (surname)
- Peal (surname)
- Piel (surname)
