= Peal (disambiguation) =

A peal is a bell-ringing performance consisting of 5000 or more changes.

Peal or Peals may also refer to:

== Places ==
- Peal de Becerro, city located in the province of Jaén, Spain
- Mount Peal, in the Beartooth Mountains in the U.S. state of Montana

== People ==
- Peal (surname)

== Other ==
- N.Peal, British luxury cashmere knitwear and accessories specialist
- Peals (band), American band

== Acronyms ==
- PEALS, Policy, Ethics and Life Sciences Research Centre

== See also ==
- Peal board, recording a peal rung on church bells
- Peel (disambiguation)
