= Peal (surname) =

Peal is a surname, and may refer to:

- Alexander Louis Peal, Liberian forester and conservationist
- Alfred Peal, farmer and state legislator in Mississippi.
- Chris Peal (born 2005), American football player
- Samuel Peal (born 1754), British manufacturer who developed a method of waterproofing cloth, namesake of Peal and Company Limited
- Samuel Edward Peal (1923–1991), Liberian diplomat and politician

== See also ==
- Peale (surname)
- Peel (surname)
