= Peter Peel =

Peter Peel may refer to:

- Peter Madsen Peel (1820–1900), first blacksmith and civic leader of Mount Pleasant, Utah
- Peter Peel (soccer coach) (1866–1960), a two-time president of the United States Football Association
