= Peale (surname) =

Peale is a surname, and may refer to:

- Albert Charles Peale (1849–1914), American geologist, mineralogist and paleobotanist, grandson of Rubens Peale
- Anna Claypoole Peale (1791–1878), American miniature painter, daughter of James Peale
- Charles Willson Peale (1741–1827), American painter, soldier and naturalist
- Franklin Peale (1795–1870), American officer of the Philadelphia Mint
- Harriet Cany Peale (1799–1869), American painter
- James Peale (1749–1831), American painter, brother of Charles Willson Peale
- Margaretta Angelica Peale (1795–1882), American painter, daughter of James Peale
- Maria Peale (1787–1866), American painter, daughter of James Peale
- Mary Jane Peale (1827–1902), American painter, daughter of Rubens and Eliza Burd Patterson Peale
- Norman Vincent Peale (1898–1993), American Christian preacher and author
- Raphaelle Peale (1774–1825), American painter of still-life, son of Charles Willson Peale
- Rembrandt Peale (1778–1860), American neoclassical painter, son of Charles Willson Peale
- Rosalba Carriera Peale (1799–1874), American painter and lithographer, daughter of Rembrandt Peale
- Rubens Peale (1784–1865), American artist and museum director, son of Charles Willson Peale
- Ruth Stafford Peale (1906–2008), American writer
- Sarah Miriam Peale (1800–1885), American portrait painter, daughter of James Peale
- Sophonisba Angusciola Peale (1786–1859), American ornithologist and artist
- Stanton J. Peale (1937–2015), American astrophysicist
- Titian Ramsay Peale I (1780–1798), American ornithologist, entomologist and artist, son of Charles Willson Peale
- Titian Peale (1799–1885), American artist, naturalist, entomologist and photographer, son of Charles Willson Peale

== See also ==
- Peal (surname)
- Peele
- Peile
