= Peale =

Peale may refer to:

== People ==
=== Surname ===
- Peale (surname)

=== Given name ===
- John Peale Bishop (1892–1944), American poet and man of letters
- Charles Peale Polk (1767–1822), American portrait painter

== Animals ==
- Peale's dolphin, a dolphin found near the southern tip of South America
- Peale's falcon, a subspecies of peregrine falcon
- Peale's free-tailed bat, a bat of South and Central America

== Other uses ==
- Mount Peale, the highest peak in the Manti-La Sal National Forest, Utah, United States
- Peale, Pennsylvania, a ghost town in Clearfield County, United States
- Peale House, the building housing the office of the President of La Salle University, Philadelphia, Pennsylvania, United States
- Peale Museum, a museum of painting and natural history in Baltimore, Maryland, United States
- Peale Island, an island of Wake island in the Pacific.

== See also ==
- Colonial families of Maryland
- Peel (disambiguation)
- Peele (disambiguation)
