= Peel Region =

Peel Region may refer to:

- Peel (Western Australia), a region south of Perth, Western Australia
- Regional Municipality of Peel, a region in Southern Ontario, Canada

== See also ==
- Peel (disambiguation)
