= Zenith Flash-matic =

1955 television wireless remote control

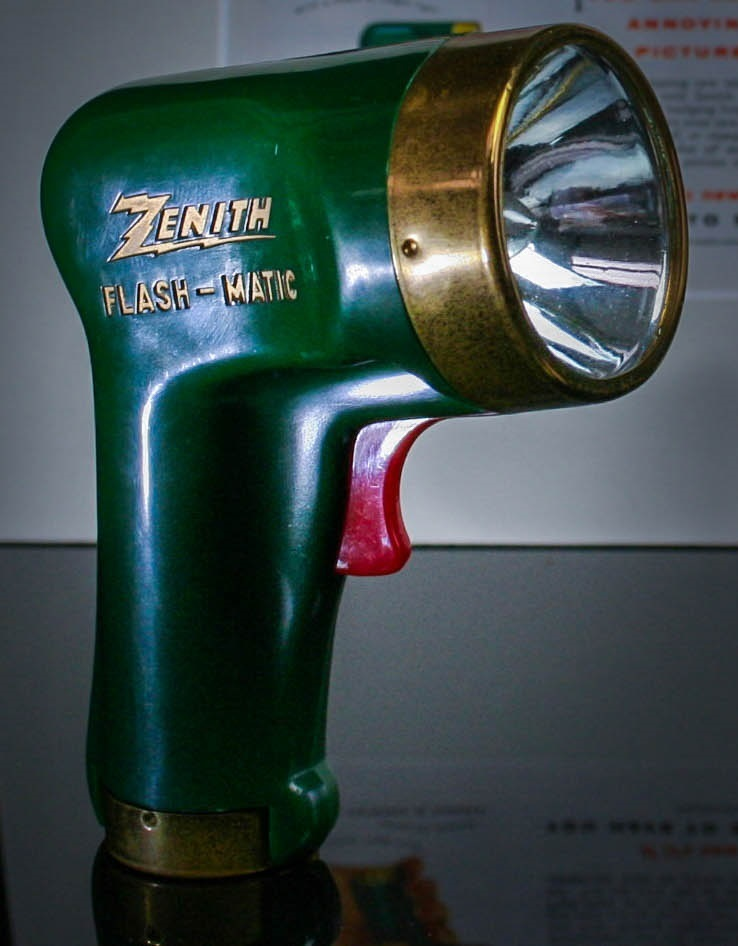
Zenith Flash-Matic

The Zenith Flash-Matic was the first wireless remote control for television, invented by Eugene Polley in 1955. It had only one button that was used to power on and off, channel up, channel down, and mute. The Flash-matic's phototechnology was a significant innovation in television and allowed for wireless signal transfer previously exclusive to radio.

== Design and production ==
Earlier remotes could turn sets on/off and change channels, but were connected to the TV with a cable. The Flash-matic came in response to consumer complaints about the inconvenience of these cables running from the transmitter to the TV monitor. Earlier remotes served as the central control system for transmitting complex signals to the receiving monitor. The Flash-matic instead placed the complexity in the receiver as opposed to the transmitter. It used a directional beam of light to control a television outfitted with four photo cells in the corners of the screen. The light signal would activate one of the four control functions, which turned the picture and sound on or off, and turned the channel tuner dial clockwise or counter-clockwise. The bottom receptors received the signal to mute and power on/off, and the upper cells received signals to channel up/down. In order for the light beam to be received by the monitor, the remote control had to be directed towards one of the four photocells. The system responded to full-spectrum light so it could be activated or interfered with by other light sources including indoor light bulbs and the sun. Despite these defects, the Flash-matic remained in high demand. In September 1955, Zenith apologized for its inability to meet the consumer demand. The Flash-matic was soon replaced by better control systems. The "Zenith Space Command" remote control went into production in 1956 with aims to improve upon the Flash-matic's design.

== Advertisement Campaign ==
The Flash-matic was marketed as an interactive technology and tuning device for the television. Muting was the first control feature to be included on a remote control but unavailable on the monitor. The advertising campaign for the Flash-matic remote control emphasized its ability to "shut off annoying commercials while the picture remains on the screen." The mute button was explicitly designed for the purpose of tuning out the commercials. As a result of this new feature as well as the Flash-matic's pistol shape, the Flash-matic's ad campaigns invited viewers to "shoot" the annoying commercials or announcers that they were tired of listening to, while leaving the image present so that the viewer would know when to turn the sound back on.

== See also ==
- Zenith Space Commander, mechanical ultrasonic remote control of the 1960s
