= Eugene Polley =

American consumer electronics engineer (1915–2012)

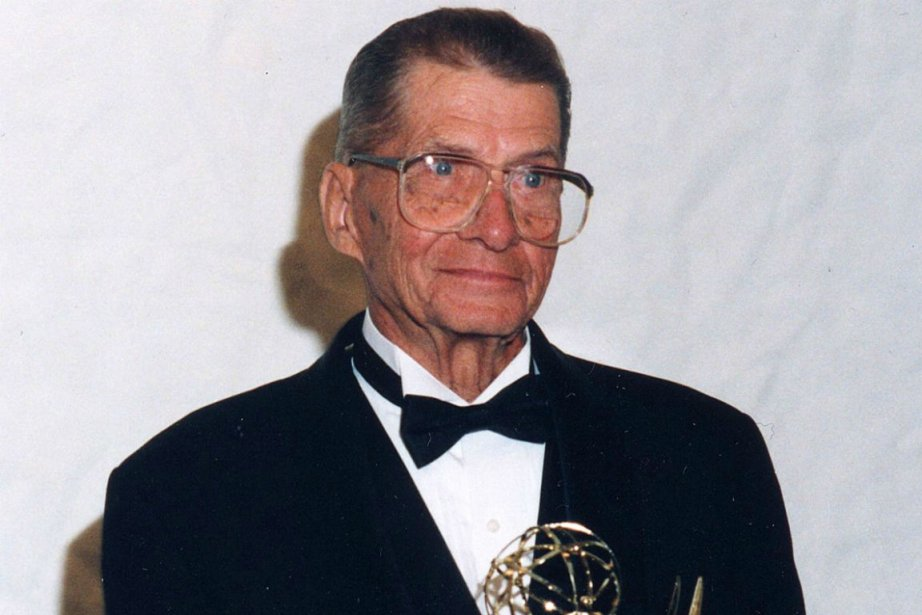
- Born: Eugene Joseph Polley; November 29, 1915; Chicago, Illinois, U.S.
- Died: May 20, 2012 (aged 96); Downers Grove, Illinois, U.S.
- Education: City Colleges of Chicago, Armour Institute of Technology
- Engineering career
- Discipline: Engineering
- Employer(s): Zenith Electronics; 1935 - 1982
- Projects: Radar, Push-button car radio, Video disks
- Significant design: Wireless remote control for televisions
- Awards: Technology & Engineering Emmy Award (1997); IEEE Consumer Electronics Award (2009)

Eugene Joseph Polley (November 29, 1915 – May 20, 2012) was an electrical engineer and engineering manager for Zenith Electronics who invented the first wireless remote control for television.

== Life and career ==
Eugene J. Polley was born November 29, 1915, in Chicago, Illinois, to parents of Polish descent. He attended the City Colleges of Chicago and Armour Institute of Technology, but he left before graduating. In 1935, he was hired as a stock boy for Zenith Electronics; he moved to the company's parts department, where he created the company's first catalog, then transferred to engineering, where his assignments included work on radar during World War II for the U.S. Department of Defense.

His 1955 invention, marketed as the Flash-Matic, used visible light to remotely control a television outfitted with four photocells in the cabinet at the corners of the screen. Aiming the pistol-shaped control at an individual photocell could turn the receiver on and off, mute the sound and change the channel up or down. Polley also worked on the push-button car radio and contributed to the development of video disks.

Polley's career at Zenith included positions as a product engineer and mechanical engineer. Polley later managed its Video Recording Group, then its Advanced Mechanical Design Group; he eventually became Assistant Division Chief for Zenith's Mechanical Engineering Group. He retired after a 47-year career in which he earned 18 U.S. patents.

Polley and Robert Adler shared a 1996–1997 Technology & Engineering Emmy Award for "Pioneering Development of Wireless Remote Control for Consumer Television."

In 2009, Polley received the IEEE Consumer Electronics Award "for contributions to the technology of the wireless remote control for television and other consumer electronic products."

== Death ==
Polley died on May 20, 2012, at Advocate Good Samaritan Hospital in Downers Grove, Illinois. His death was announced by Zenith Electronics, for whom he worked from 1935 to 1982. He was 96.
