= Orange Peel =

Orange peel is the peel of an orange. Orange Peel or Orange peel may also refer to:

== Science and technology ==
- The Goode homolosine projection, often called the "orange-peel projection"
- Orange peel (effect), a type of finish on painted or cast surfaces
  - Orange peel effect, on a gramophone record
- Orange peel colour, a shade of orange
- Orange peel fungus (Aleuria aurantia)
- Peau d'orange (French for "skin of an orange"), describing anatomy with the appearance and dimpled texture of orange peel

== Other uses ==
- Orange Peel (horse), a thoroughbred stallion
- Sir Robert Peel (1788–1850), British statesman nicknamed "Orange Peel"
- The Orange Peel, a concert venue in Asheville, North Carolina, US

== See also ==
- Peel (disambiguation)
- Zest (ingredient), a food ingredient prepared by scraping or cutting from the outer skin of citrus fruits such as oranges
