= Participatory justice =

Participatory justice, broadly speaking, refers to the direct participation of those affected most by a particular decision, in the decision-making process itself: this could refer to decisions made in a court of law or by policymakers. Popular participation has been called "the ethical seal of a democratic society" by Friedhelm Hengsbach, a professor of Christian Social Science and Economic and Social Ethics at the Philosophical-Theological College Sankt Georgen in Frankfurt and "the politics of the future" by Gene Stephens, professor of criminology at the University of South Carolina. It is about people and relationships.

Various authors have claimed that examples of participatory justice date back to civilizations as old as that of the Canadian Aboriginals and Ancient Athenians, even if the terminology had not been in use then. In the society of Canadian Aboriginals, citizens were given the opportunity to give their own account of a dispute in public and determine the proper course of action, which sometimes involved issuing a public apology. Elders were viewed as authorities due to their unique knowledge of the circumstances of community members. In ancient Athens, large popular courts, made up of 200 to 1000 randomly selected male citizens, shared in both functions of forming and of applying the law. The term "participatory justice" itself, however, was first used by Bellevue, Washington-based attorney Claire Sherman Thomas in 1984 to describe the process by which people act as responsible participants in the law making process, thereby contributing to causes of social justice. In 1986, Gene Stephens first used the term to describe an alternative to the adversarial model of justice system used in court.

Both definitions of participatory justice relate to the concept of participatory democracy, which shares similar aspirations: to provide the government with democratic legitimacy and make for a more inclusive, transparent, equal society, by allowing citizens to participate directly in political decision-making and lawmaking processes that affect their lives.

In rare cases, it also refers to the use of the Internet or a television reality show to catch a perpetrator.

== Judicial system ==
=== Overview ===
Participatory justice can refer to the use of alternative dispute resolution, such as mediation, conciliation, and arbitration, in criminal and civil courts, instead of, or before, going to court. It is sometimes called "community dispute resolution". NGOs (Non-governmental organizations) may get involved in the administration of criminal justice. According to the National Advisory Commission of Criminal Justice Standards and Goals, delays in sentencing and lack of protection of rights of the accused contribute to attitudes of legal cynicism. According to a large cohort of citizens, the guilty are freed while the innocent, and often the black and poor, are harassed. The participatory justice model, in turn, attempts to restore public confidence in the legal system.

Whereas the adversarial and disposition system is often slow-functioning, expensive, and inconsistent, the participatory justice model is a cheap and efficient way of resolution-making. Rather than rely on expensive attorneys and expert witnesses, the model relies on volunteers from the community, who are trained in mediation and counseling techniques. The resolution is often achieved quicker, because, by reaching a consent agreement implemented by all parties involved, there is no possibility of re-litigation. In the participatory justice model, cooperation is valued instead of competition and reconciliation instead of winner-take-all. The need to protect the public and to respect the rights of ordinary citizens to a free but secure society are considered. This in turn helps preserve positive relationships between the parties involved. In modern-day Canada, for instance, community members are involved in almost every step of the judicial process, even before people are arrested and sent to court; community organizations establish working partnerships with police to focus attention on growing social problems, like child abandonment or housing code violations, and prevent crime.

Not only does the participatory justice model promote inclusion, according to several authors, but also socioeconomic equality. The adversarial/dispositional system requires enforcing laws that often represent the will of those with the most educational and monetary resources. As Stephens points out, most people who are perpetrators in a particular incident, whether civil or criminal, had also been victims at some point, so every person's circumstances should be taken into consideration. Stahn mentions the importance of consulting victims at the reparation stage to determine whether they really believe the person who committed the crime against them is deserving of incarceration. Once used primarily in Scandinavia, Asia, and Africa, participatory justice has been "exported" to the United States.

Finally, participatory justice serves as a crucial check on state power, that legitimizes the rule of law itself. As long as citizens believe in their ability to contribute to the law making and evaluation process, public consensus supports the rule of law. Without consensus, the government must rely on the letter of the law and threat of prosecution to maintain order; the government might resort to censorship and surveillance. The law becomes "instead of a vehicle of justice, the instrument of a bureaucratic, institutionalized, dehumanized government." Therefore, by reducing legal cynicism in communities, participatory justice effectively decreases the likelihood that the state will respond to this cynicism through use of overly punitive justice.

Once used primarily in Scandinavia, Asia, and Africa, participatory justice has been "exported" to the United States and Canada. It is used in a variety of cases, including between "Landlords and Tenants, Neighbours, Parents and Children, Families and Schools, Consumers and Merchants ... [and] victims of crime and offenders." For war-torn countries, participatory justice can promote coexistence and reconciliation, through an emphasis on universal participation.

An online and self-financed form of participatory justice, called the crowdjury system, has been promoted as an improved way of managing trials in the future. Witnesses to a crime can upload evidence online into a secure vault. Data can then be organized into useful knowledge by groups of 9 to 12 self-selected volunteers with expertise. If a defendant pleads guilty, they can propose a form of restoration, as a way to avoid harsher punishment; if they do not plead, an online trial will be held with a massive randomly-selected jury. Participants in the evidence review process will receive monetary compensation through Bitcoin or alt coin. According to crowdjury's proponents, this will help the government cut costs and create a more transparent judicial process.

=== Criticisms ===
Critics of the participatory justice model cite its purpose to often humiliate a particular party. Inkiko-Gacaca, a system of community courts established in 2002 to respond to the large number of suspected perpetrators imprisoned after the 1994 Rwandan genocide, is a famous example. Meant to achieve lasting peace through the promotion of restorative justice, Gacaca, according to several authors, has only become more retributive and coercive. Through the process, Tutsi genocide survivors allegedly impose guilt on the Hutu, asking them to confess their deeds, express apologies to all victims and kin, and repay them tangibly, through public shaming. The participatory justice model has also been critiqued for its lack of checks and balances and lack of participation of professional experts. Because the negotiators are usually not trained in the collection of evidence and are not privy to the criminal background of the alleged offender, the resolution may be made without full facts and knowledge. Furthermore, the offender's motivation is difficult to assess if the alternative is more formal punishment.

== Legislative system ==
=== Overview ===
Participatory justice can also refer to the rights of individuals and groups to actively participate in policy-making and engage in debates about social justice. In a participatory justice model, rule makers rely on the participation of affected interests rather than on administrators, politicians, and the general population. This often leads to the redistribution of resources and recognition of those whose voices have historically been excluded, due in part to a lack of financial and educational resources to contribute.

The Negotiated Rulemaking Act made it a priority to ensure that people most affected by a particular issue, particularly poor people, would be able to take part in the negotiation process; the government provides agency funding to defray costs of participation in rulemaking. Giving marginalized groups the chance to participate in the decision making process can help ensure they participate in the community more generally as well. For example, during the United Nations Convention on the Rights of Persons with Disabilities (CRPD), disabled peoples organizations (DPOs) were engaged in and consulted during the drafting of a comprehensive program that would enable the disabled to participate in the civil, political, economic, social, and cultural life of the community. Also, within the CRPD, states were encouraged to involve DPOs when preparing reports for the body meant to monitor the implementation of the program.

Arguments supporting various participatory justice models in the U.S. have also cited the equal protection clause 14th amendment, protection of individual legal rights, upholding of autonomy, integrationism, and democratic principles in their support. Participatory justice models are seen as a way to fight against the paternalistic approach of the government in which legislators choose for citizens, without their input. When affected individuals can participate in the policymaking process, they become viewed as subjects rather than objects.

Consensus rule is more administratively efficient in the long run because it avoids lengthy post-enactment litigation. The legislature or administrative body using the participatory justice model also gains legitimacy, since it implies accountability. Participatory justice models have long been used by environmental justice movements. Oftentimes, participation was originally denied not because of institutional or political failure, but because those in question aren’t recognized as in the domain of justice. Young argues that participatory justice rather than distributive justice was the primary demand of communities like Afton, North Carolina. People objected that they were being subjected to risks and exposure without their consent and without mechanisms to articulate their opposition. The unfortunate reality is that those people who live in countries that will be destroyed first due to rising sea levels will not be included in decisions about when decisions are made.

=== Criticisms ===
One of the common criticisms of participatory justice models is that they might reduce efficiency, like in the environmental justice model discussed. Incorporating the voices of all affected interests is a difficult and long process, especially when the issue being decided upon is significantly controversial. Another disadvantage is that, even when you have a negotiating body and it does include affected interests, it might be difficult for all interests to be equally represented. This problem, however, can be fixed by providing those negotiating with negotiation skills, as well as development of relevant information and payment of expenses involved in participation, like in the PJ model employed SSA's representative payment program. Another disadvantage of using a participatory justice model is the inexperience of those participating. The participants may not have as much respect for the wide number of legal and ethical considerations that need to be made when writing policy proposals. For this reason, some critics argue that policy experts should be able to mediate the conversations on various policies, especially when modern laws are much more complex than those in places like ancient Athens, where laws were inscribed on panels all over the city and set up in the agora.

== See also ==
- Citizens' assembly
- Community x-change
- Internet 2.0
- Participatory democracy
- Participatory economics
- Privatization in criminal justice
- Public engagement
- Public participation
- Victimology
