= Peel Island =

Peel Island may refer to:

- Peel Island (Queensland), Australia
- Peel Island, Cumbria, England
- Peel Island, historical English name of Chichijima, Japan

== See also ==
- Piel Island
- Peel (disambiguation)
