= Anne Peile =

Anne Peile is a writer. Her first novel, Repeat It Today with Tears, was published by Serpent's Tail in June 2010. A transgressive love story set in 1970s Chelsea, it has garnered much critical acclaim and was long listed for the 2011 Orange Prize. However, it is thought that its controversial subject matter may have excluded it from some mainstream nominations. The book has already been translated into Dutch (Ailantus), Italian (Einaudi) and Chinese (Guangxi Normal University Press).

Following its American release in August 2011, Repeat It Today with Tears was named in USA Today as one of the year's top ten books from independent publishers.

In May 2013, Peile self-published her second novel, Seeing the World. Set in 1960s London and against the backdrop of the Kennedy ascendancy, Seeing the World tells the story of people within and far beyond the family of Jane. Jane is a strange and solitary child given to uncanny migrations of perception through which she may – or may not – have the gift of seeing things.
