= Peel Park =

Peel Park can refer to:

- Peel Park, Bradford
- Peel Park, East Kilbride
- Peel Park, the original name of West Park, Macclesfield
- Peel Park, Salford
- Peel Park (stadium)
