= John Peel (disambiguation) =

John Peel (1939–2004) was a British broadcaster and radio personality.

John Peel may also refer to:

- John Peel (huntsman) (1776–1854), huntsman and the subject of the 19th century song "D'ye ken John Peel"
- John Peel (priest) (1798–1875), Dean of Worcester
- John Peel (Tamworth MP) (1804–1872), MP for Tamworth 1863–68, 1871–73
- John Peel (gynaecologist) (1904–2005), Surgeon-Gynaecologist to Queen Elizabeth II, 1961–1973
- John Peel (Leicester MP) (1912–2004), British politician, MP for Leicester South East 1957–74
- J. H. B. Peel (1913–1983), British writer about farming and the countryside
- John Peel (writer) (born 1954), science fiction author

== See also ==
- "D'ye ken John Peel?", a 19th century song
- Jonathan Peel (1799–1879), British soldier, politician, and racehorse owner
