= Peeler (disambiguation) =

A peeler is a metal blade attached to a handle that is used for peeling vegetables.

Peeler may also refer to:

== People ==
- Anthony Peeler (born 1969), American professional basketball player
- Bob Peeler (born 1952), American politician
- Harvey S. Peeler, Jr. (born 1948), American politician
- Nicole D. Peeler (born 1978), American author
- Walter Peeler (1887–1968), Australian recipient of the Victoria Cross

== Other uses ==
- "The Peeler", a short story by Flannery O'Connor
- Peeler (law enforcement), British and Irish slang for a police officer, named after Sir Robert Peel (1788-1850), British Prime Minister and founder of the London Metropolitan Police
- Peelers: The PSNI for Real, BBC police documentary television series
- Bronc Peeler, an American comic strip cowboy
- Peeler Lake, a lake in Mono County, California
