= Peel ministry =

Peel ministry may refer to:

- Wellington–Peel ministry, the British government under the Duke of Wellington and Sir Robert Peel (1828–1830)
- First Peel ministry, the British minority government led by Sir Robert Peel (1834–1835)
- Second Peel ministry, the British majority government led by Sir Robert Peel (1841–1846)
