= Alfred Peal =

American politician

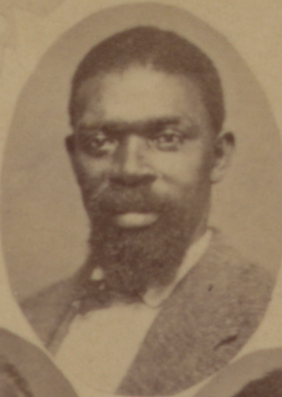

Member of the Mississippi House of Representatives
- In office 1874–1875

Personal details
- Born: Mississippi, U.S.
- Party: Republican
- Profession: Politician, farmer

Alfred Peal was a farmer and state legislator in Mississippi. He was born in Mississippi and was enslaved. He served in the Mississippi House of Representatives from Marshall County, Mississippi in 1874 and 1875.

He was among the Republican leaders who pledged support for the renomination of congressman A. R. Howe.

== See also ==
- African American officeholders from the end of the Civil War until before 1900
