= Peel (software) =

Software

- Developer: Hjalti Jakobsson
- Release: July, 2007
- Written in: Objective-C
- Operating system: macOS
- Available in: English
- Type: Media player
- Website: getpeel.com

Peel is a discontinued MP3 blog player for Mac OS X. It was created by Icelandic programmer Hjalti Jakobsson and originally released as a free, but was later changed to $15 upon full release.

== Features ==
Peel starts out with three MP3 blogs preloaded. An MP3 blog URL can be input to generate a playlist of the available songs. The user is able to listen to the songs, download the songs, and copy them into iTunes. There are columns for date added, song title, artist, and size. The user interface resembles simplified iTunes. The program was noted as being lightweight.

The program also has a built in web browser for viewing an MP3 blog's website without switching applications.

== Reception ==
The beta of the program was given positive reviews by Engadget, Wired, and BuzzFeed.

== See also ==
- Songbird
