= Dufferin-Peel =

Dufferin-Peel may refer to any of the following entities representing Dufferin County and parts or all of Peel Region in Ontario, Canada:

- Dufferin—Caledon (provincial electoral district), a provincial electoral district known from 1987 to 1999 as Dufferin—Peel
- Dufferin—Peel—Wellington—Grey, a federal electoral district from 1997 to 2004
- Dufferin—Peel—Wellington—Grey (provincial electoral district), a provincial electoral district from 1999 to 2007
- Dufferin-Peel Catholic District School Board
