= Robert Adler =

Austrian-American inventor

- Robert Adler
- Born: December 4, 1913; Vienna, Austria-Hungary
- Died: February 15, 2007 (aged 93); Boise, Idaho, U.S.
- Education: University of Vienna
- Known for: wireless remote control for televisions
- Awards: Edison Medal (1980)
- Scientific career
- Fields: Physics
- Workplaces: Zenith Electronics

Robert Adler (December 4, 1913 – February 15, 2007) was an Austrian-American inventor who held numerous patents. He worked for Zenith Electronics, retiring as the company's Vice President and Director of Research. His work included developing early sound-based remote controls for televisions, which were the standard for 25 years until replaced by infrared (IR) remotes that could transmit more complex commands.

== Achievements ==
Adler was born in Vienna in 1913, the son of Jenny (née Herzmark), a doctor, and Max Adler, a social theorist. He earned a Ph.D. in Physics from the University of Vienna in 1937. Following Austria's annexation by Nazi Germany in 1938, Adler, who was Jewish, left the country. He traveled first to Belgium, then to England, where he acted on the advice of friends, who recommended that he emigrate to the United States. After emigrating to the United States, he began working at Zenith Electronics in the research division in 1941. In his lifetime, Adler was granted more than 180 US patents.

== Contributions to the remote control ==
The invention Adler is best known for is the wireless remote control for televisions. While not the first remote control, its underlying technology was a vast improvement over previous remote control systems.

The "Zenith Flash-Matic" remote control, invented by Eugene Polley, another engineer at Zenith, was the first wireless remote control, replacing the signal cable–based remote control devices, which never were a success. The Flash-Matic used directional flashlight in the transmitter device, and photocells in the television set itself. One of the major shortcomings of this technology was that if the television set was exposed to direct sunlight, it could inadvertently trigger one of the remote control functions. The company president sent the engineers back to the drawing board to come up with a better solution.

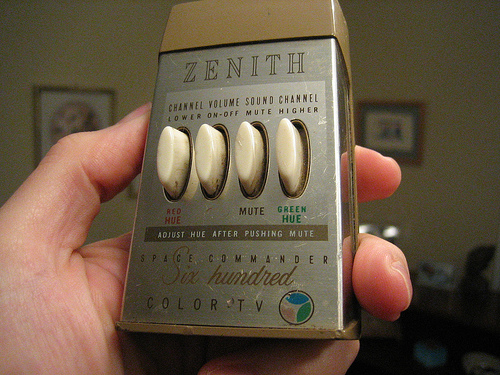
A Zenith Space Commander 600 remote control.

A system based on radio waves was briefly considered but rejected because the signals could easily travel through walls and could inadvertently change the channel on a neighbor's television. Furthermore, the marketing people at Zenith desired a remote control which did not require batteries, as it was perceived at the time that if the battery died, the customer might think something was wrong with the television set itself.

Adler's solution was to use sound waves to transmit signals to the TV. The first remote control he developed, the "Space Commander", used aluminum rods, analogous to tuning forks, struck by hammers toggled by the buttons on the device, to produce high-frequency tones that would be interpreted to control functions on the television set.

In the 1960s, Adler modified the remote control to use ultrasonic signals, a technology which went on to be used in television sets manufactured for the next 25 years, until replaced by infrared systems which could transmit more complex commands but required batteries to run.

== Professional accomplishments ==
By the time of his retirement from Zenith, officially in 1982, Adler was the company's Vice President and Director of Research. He remained a technical advisor to Zenith until 1999. In 1980, Adler was awarded the Edison Medal. In 1997, Adler and Polley were jointly awarded an Emmy Award by the National Academy of Television Arts and Sciences. Adler's last patent application was filed on October 6, 2006, for work on touchscreen technology.

== Death ==
Robert Adler died in a Boise, Idaho, nursing home of heart failure at age 93.
