= Peel County =

Peel County may refer to:

- Peel County, Ontario, Canada
- Peel County, Western Australia
