= Peel Street =

Peel Street may refer to:

- Peel Street, Adelaide, Australia
- Peel Street, Hong Kong
- Peel Street, Montreal, Canada
