= Peile =

Peile is a surname, and may refer to:

- Alfred James Peile (1868–1948), British artillery officer, malacologist and conchologist
- Anne Peile, writer
- James Peile (1863–1940), Anglican priest
- James Peile (administrator) (1833–1906), administrator in India
- John Peile (1838–1910), English philologist
- Kinsey Peile (1862–1934), British playwright
