= Alexander Louis Peal =

Liberian forester and conservationist

- Born: Liberia
- Occupation: conservationist
- Notable work: Peal is the president and CEO of the nonprofit Society for the Conservation of the Nature of Liberia.
- Awards: Goldman Environmental Prize in 2000.

Alexander Louis Peal is a Liberian forester and conservationist who won the prestigious international Goldman Environmental Prize in 2000 for his efforts to protect and preserve the biodiversity and natural heritage of his home country. Peal, working with pygmy hippopotamus researcher Phillip Robinson, surveyed the area that was established as Sapo National Park in 1983, creating Liberia's first official national park.

Peal is the president and CEO of the nonprofit Society for the Conservation of the Nature of Liberia, and a member of the Primate Specialist Group of the IUCN Species Survival Commission for his interest and research in conservation of the common chimpanzee (Pan troglodytes) in Sapo.
