= Governor Peel =

Governor Peel may refer to:

- William Peel (colonial administrator) (1875–1945), 18th Governor of Hong Kong from 1930 to 1935
- Robert Francis Peel (1874–1924), Governor of Saint Helena from 1920 to 1925
