= Peel Hall =

Peel Hall may refer to:

- Peel Hall, Cheshire, a country house in Cheshire
- Peel Hall, Wythenshawe, an area of Greater Manchester
