= Policy, Ethics and Life Sciences Research Centre =

English-based research centre

Coordinates: 54.973°N 1.621°W

The Policy, Ethics and Life Sciences Research Centre (PEALS) was established in 1999 as a partnership between the University of Durham, Newcastle University and the Centre for Life.

PEALS aims to research, inform and improve policy, professional practice and democratic participation in the life sciences. It particularly promotes research and debate on the social and ethical aspects of genetics and other life sciences.

The Centre publishes the Teach Yourself Citizens Juries Handbook.
