= Peter Madsen Peel =

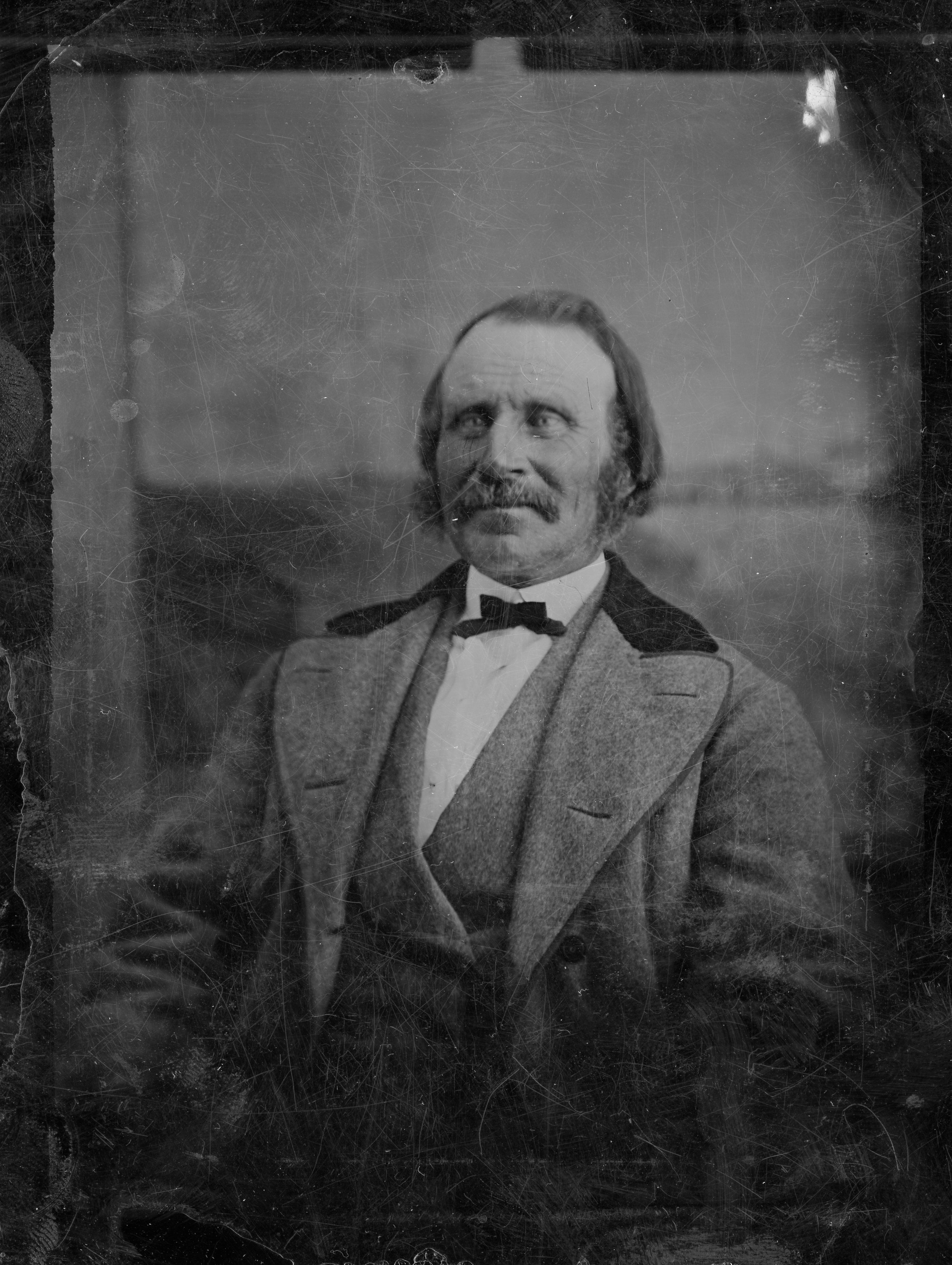
- Born: Peter Madsen Pihl; 24 Aug, 1820; Aakirkeby, Denmark
- Died: 20 Nov, 1900; Mount Pleasant, Utah
- Occupation: Blacksmith
- Known for: First blacksmith in Mount Pleasant, Utah
- Spouse: Christianna Folkman

Peter Madsen Peel (1820–1900) was a founder, first blacksmith, and civic leader of Mount Pleasant, Utah. A replica of his blacksmith shop is located next to the Relic Hall in Mt. Pleasant, including a working forge. Peel was born in Aakirkeby, Denmark, in 1820; he was married in 1846 to Christianna Folkman. In 1853–54, they emigrated to the United States, living first in Lehi, Utah, then moving to Sanpete County during the Utah War in 1858. Peel joined with others in founding Mt. Pleasant in 1859.

In addition to being the first blacksmith in Mt. Pleasant, Peel was an investor in an early mill on First West, the first president of the Birch Creek Irrigation Company, and a leader in the Church of Jesus Christ of Latter-day Saints (he ordained Anthon H. Lund to be a Seventy).

Peel and his wife rented rooms in their home on "Peel Corner" to such a degree that it was referred to as the "Peel Hotel". The Pioneer Monument in Mt. Pleasant lists Peel as a founder of the city.
