= Peel Technologies =

Software company

Peel
- Industry: Software
- Founded: 2009; 17 years ago
- Founders: Bala Krishnan; Thiru Arunachalam
- Headquarters: Mountain View, California, U.S.
- Area served: Worldwide
- Key people: Thiru Arunachalam (CEO); Bala Krishnan (CPO)

Peel is a company based in Mountain View, California, USA that sells a mobile application which provides universal remote control functionality.

The application came pre-installed on some Samsung and HTC devices. In 2015, Peel claimed that it had over 120 million registered users. Since 2017, the application has been criticized for adware-like behavior.

== History ==
Peel Smart Remote was launched in 2009 by CEO Thiru Arunachalam and co-founder and chief product officer Bala Krishnan. Peel built an initial user base from agreements with major device manufacturers Samsung and HTC to include Peel as a pre-installed application on smartphones sold in India. In 2015, Peel claimed that it generated over 100 billion remote commands with over 120 million registered users.

Peel has raised more than 90 million dollars from investors.

== Peel Smart Remote ==
Peel Smart Remote is a universal remote control application. Users can also use it to interact with friends and other TV viewers, tune into shows, record programming, or get viewing reminders. Users can also share content with their contacts. It can use both built-in IR hardware and WiFi to discover and control devices.

The application is available for iOS and Android devices. It is pre-installed on Samsung and HTC devices that have an infrared blaster, including Samsung Galaxy S6 and HTC One M9, and it could not be uninstalled from some devices. In 2014, the application completed an average of 30 billion remote control actions per month, worked in over 200 countries and delivered program guides in 110 countries.

=== Controversy ===
Since 2017, the Android application has received criticism for displaying advertisements on the lock screen, as well as for showing full-screen advertisements upon unlocking the device and continuously running in the background, which is what allows it to display those advertisements.

In 2019, it was reported that the application sent users' pictures and other personal information to a server that was not owned by Peel. This behavior was then removed, without comments by the publisher. The application was subsequently removed from Google Play.
