= Peele =

Persons with the surname Peele include:

- Amanda E. Peele (1903–1978), American biologist
- Beverly Peele (b. 1975), fashion model
- George Peele (1556-1596), the English dramatist
- John Thomas Peele (1822-1897), British painter
- Jordan Peele (b. 1979), filmmaker, comedian, and actor
- Randy Peele (b. 1957), basketball coach
- Stanton Peele (b. 1946), author of books about addiction
- William Walter Peele (1881-1959), American Methodist Bishop

== See also ==
- Pele (name), given name and surname
- Peel (disambiguation)
- Peale (disambiguation)
