= Michel Météry =

French diver and wreck hunter

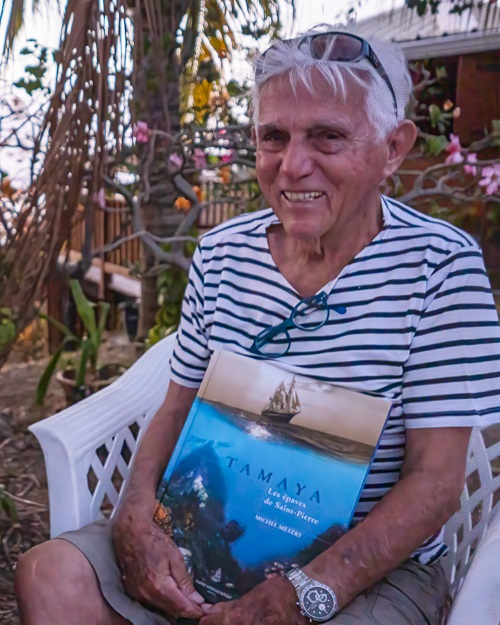
- Alexandre Hache and Michel Météry (right)
- Born: February 2, 1938 (age 88); Montélimar, France
- Employer: Principal manager UCPA diving center

Michel Météry (born February 2, 1938) is a diver and wreck hunter, who notably discovered the wrecks of Saint-Pierre harbor in Martinique in the early 1980s.

Born in Montélimar, he left for Martinique in 1972. He was the director of the Latitude Hotel in Le Carbet and then of the UCPA diving base in Saint-Pierre, Martinique.

During his dive, he discovered the wrecks of the boats that sank during the 1902 volcanic eruption of Mount Pelée on May 8, 1902.

From his discoveries, Météry wrote a book Tamaya – The Wrecks of Saint-Pierre, which was prefaced by Jacques-Yves Cousteau and Albert Falco.

In a 2005 article on diving in Martinique, Christophe de Chenay in Le Monde, referred to Météry's discoveries.

== List of wrecks discovered by Michel Météry ==
Here is the list of wrecks discovered by Météry: The anchorage area around these wrecks is now protected.

- Yacht italien, front winch resting between −20 and −40m
- Sailboat on a sandy slope at −50m overhanging rudder
- Gabriel (later identified as Biscay) 3-masted sailboat rigged as a schooner, built in wood with a hull lined with copper plates. 32 meters long by 7 meters wide, built in Bilbao in 1878. Lying on the bottom at −30m
- Dalhia, dredger sunk in 1930 at −30m
- Diamant, tugboat sunk upside down −30m
- Barge towed by the Diamant at −30m
- Roraima, mixed steam −50m
- Dislocated sailboat −35m
- Large sailboat with a winch at the bow −30m
- Teresa Lo Vigo −40m
- Wreck of the Raisinier −15m
- Tamaya, 3 French square masts of 566 gross tons, built in Liverpool in 1862. -85m

== Publications ==
- Tamaya, Michel Metery (Author), Jacques-Yves Cousteau (Preface/Introduction) Ucel, Chalvet, 1990, 146p
- Tamaya: the wrecks of Saint-Pierre. Michel Metery (Author), Albert Falco (Preface/Introduction) Monaco, Oceanographic Institute, 2002, 152p. (ISBN 2-903581-30-4)

== Filmography ==
- Martinique : plongez avec un chasseur d'épaves - 1985 - INA
- Ma terre, c'est la mer (Martinique vidéo Sub) film de Albert Falco et Michel METERY
- HMS Diamond Rock
