= Jean Bally =

French politician in Martinique (1924–2009)

General Councillor of Martinique
- In office 1964–2001
- Constituency: Canton of Le Carbet

Mayor of Le Carbet
- In office 1967–1977

Personal details
- Born: November 1924 Fort-de-France, Martinique
- Died: 26 August 2009 (aged 84)
- Party: Independent Republicans, later Union for French Democracy
- Relations: Philippe Lavil (nephew)

Jean Bally (November 1924 – 26 August 2009) was a French politician and industrialist who managed the J. Bally rum distillery. He was a descendant of French colonial settlers from the French Antilles, locally known as Béké.

He was the son of Jacques Bally and Josèphe Trillard. He spent his childhood at Le Carbet, on the Lajus estate, where his father established the Bally distillery in 1923. After completing his classical studies, Jean Bally took over the family business in the 1950s. Under his management, the distillery consolidated its reputation, and Bally rum was exported as far as Japan, enhancing its international prestige.

He was the eighth of ten children and served as mayor of the commune of Le Carbet from 1967 to 1977. He was also vice-president of the General Council of Martinique for four years. He was the uncle of the singer Philippe Lavil.

In 1964, Bally was elected General Councillor for the canton of Le Carbet, a position he held until 2001. He also sat on the Regional Council.

During his dive, he discovered the wrecks of the boats that sank during the volcanic eruption of Mount Pelée on May 8, 1902.
