= Wrecks of Saint-Pierre harbor =

Ships sunk by 1902 eruption in Martinique

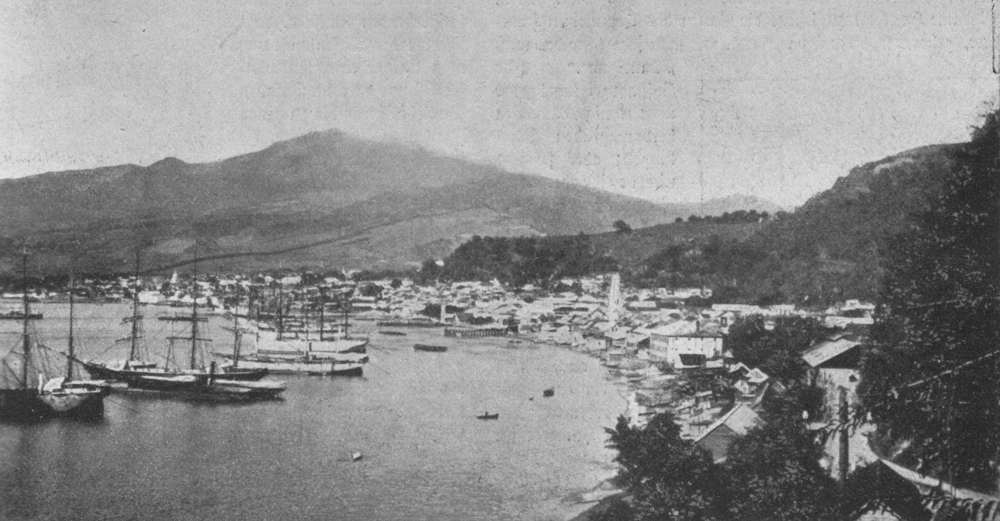
Saint-Pierre before the eruption of 1902.

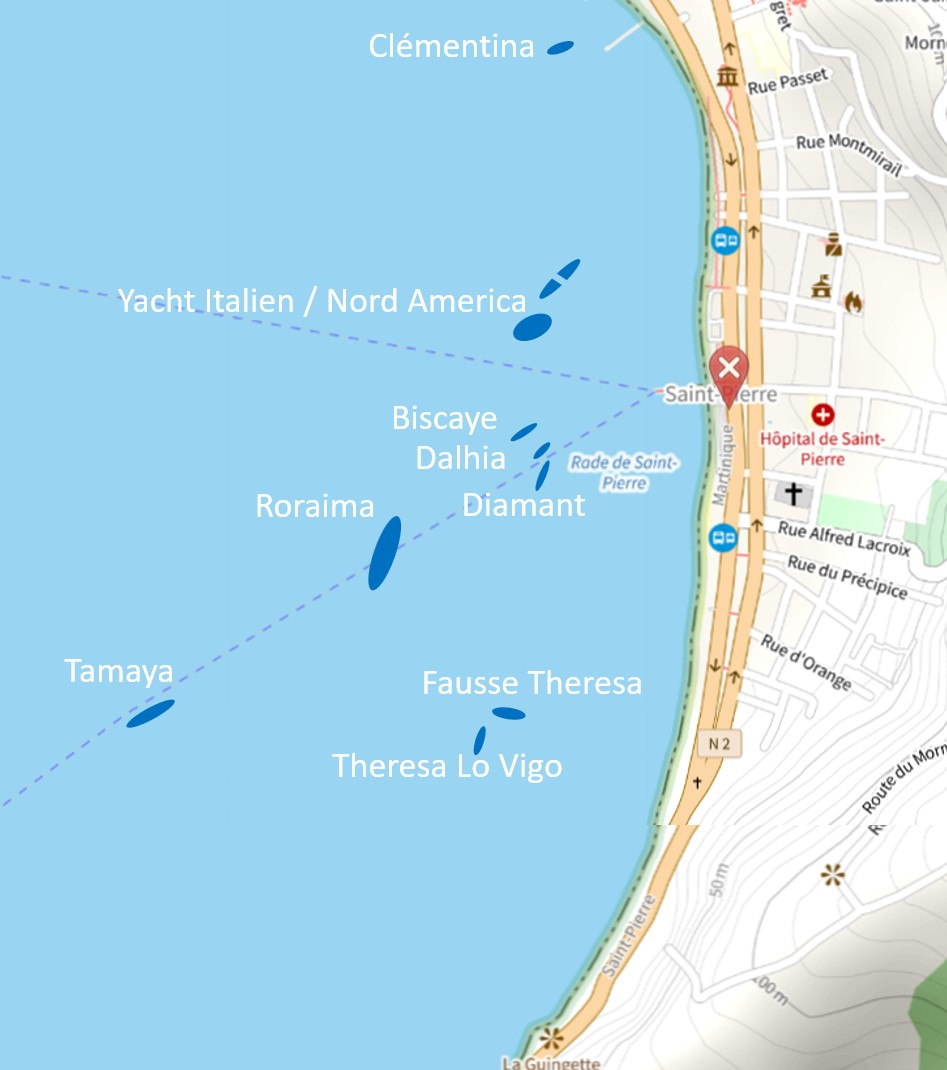
Wrecks Map

The wrecks in Saint-Pierre harbor are ships that, except for the Dahlia, were all sunk during the eruption of Mount Pelée on May 8, 1902. The eruption generated a pyroclastic flow (in French nuée ardente, "burning cloud") that destroyed the town of Saint-Pierre, Martinique in a few minutes.

During this eruption, it was estimated that 394 boats were in Saint-Pierre's bay, Martinique.

The disappearance of the port administration's archives has made it impossible to draw up an exhaustive list of the shipwrecks caused by the disaster. A report published in 1904 by the Établissement national des invalides de la marine (the French seamen's pension fund) was based on statistics and testimonies. It estimates the French losses at a minimum of 386 ships and boats, mainly coastal vessels and fishing boats, 500 crew members and 33 passengers. The foreign losses are at least 3 English ocean-going steamers with 99 crew members, 2 American sailing ships with 20 crew members, 3 Italian ocean-going sailing ships with 28 crew members and one passenger. Like the town, the ships were destroyed in an instant; most caught fire and were lost with all hands.

Local fishermen knew the locations of some of the wrecks, which sometimes snagged their nets and lay in areas rich in fish. With the advent of scuba diving in the 1970s, wreck hunters set out to search for the sunken boats. Michel Météry and Jean Bally are known as the discoverers of most of these wrecks. The discoveries began in February 1974. Michel Météry and Jean Bally declared all the wrecks to the regional cultural affairs directorate (DRAC) in May 1977. Jacques Cousteau, Albert Falco and Dominique Serafini on the Calypso were also among those who searched for them.

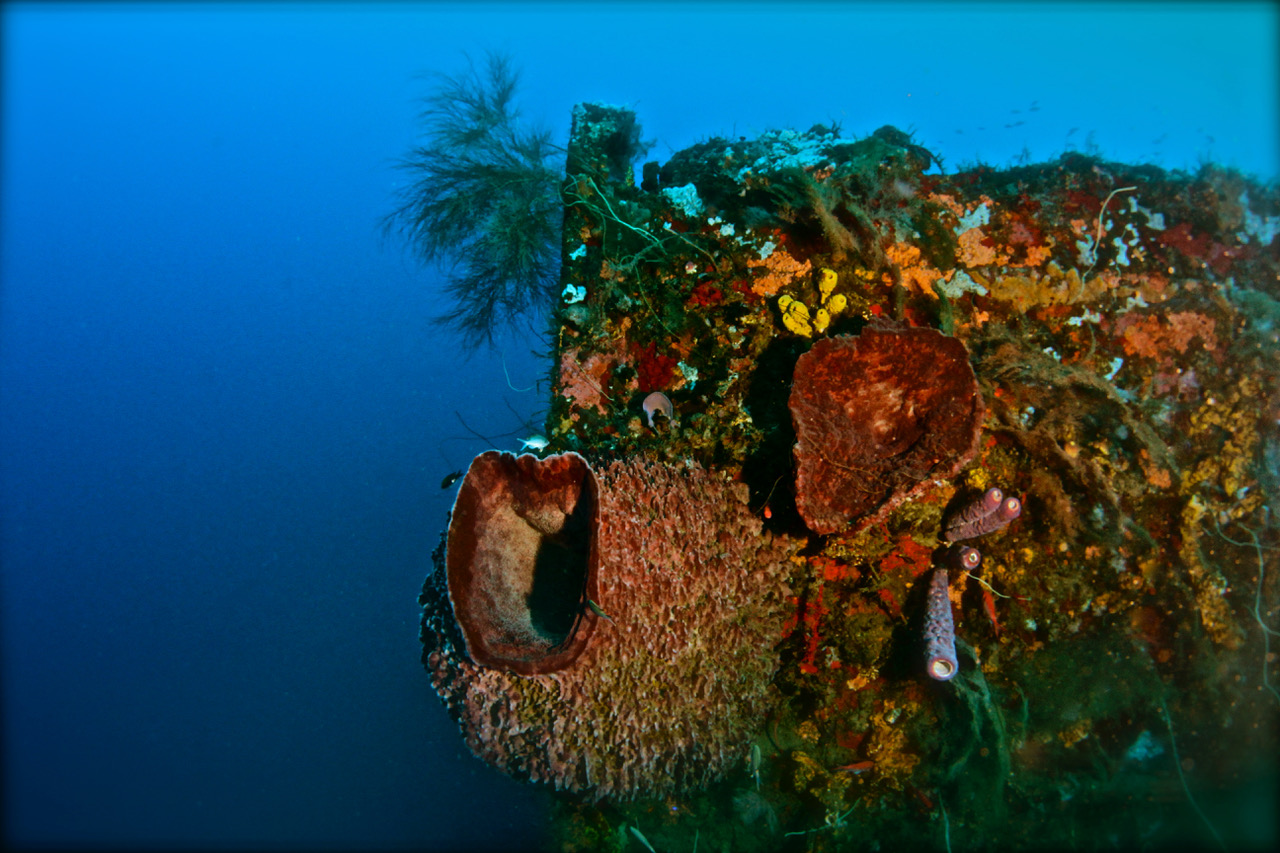
Roraima, 2023

The wrecks are now very popular dive sites, and all local diving clubs organize trips to them. The Roraima, by its size and state of preservation, is the most emblematic of these wrecks. The Tamaya is less popular because it is too deep for air diving. The Grappler with its "treasure" is still sought after.

More than a century after they sank, the wrecks have become artificial reefs, colonised by marine life, and are among the richest and most diverse in Martinique.

To preserve these cultural and heritage assets of Martinique, in 2012, the city of Saint-Pierre and the French state made the decision to protect the wrecks resting in Saint-Pierre's harbor.

The Frank A. Perret Museum of Saint-Pierre recently launched a podcast in French dedicated to the wrecks. It features, in alphabetical order, Mathurin Cadenet, originally from Saint-Pierre (nicknamed "Pierrotin"); Daniel Eustache, also Pierrotin and fisherman; Jean-Sébastien France, diver and president of the Association for Research and Valorization of the Archaeological Heritage of Martinique (ARVPAM); and Michel Météry, diver and discoverer of the wrecks in the harbor of Saint-Pierre.

The wrecks are not only important archaeological sites, but also places of remembrance of the tragic events of the 1902 eruption.

== Background ==
At the turn of the 20th century, Saint-Pierre was the largest town in Martinique and one of the most prosperous in the Caribbean. Nicknamed the "Paris of the Antilles", it had about 30,000 inhabitants and concentrated most of the island's economic and cultural life. Its harbor, sheltered by the volcanic relief, was one of the busiest in the region: merchant ships loaded and unloaded rum, sugar, cocoa and manufactured goods bound for Europe and the Americas. This traffic explains why about 394 boats of all nationalities were in the bay on the morning of 8 May 1902, some of them waiting for days to berth.

In the spring of 1902, Mount Pelée showed growing signs of activity (rumblings, ash falls, sulphurous gas). On 8 May at 7:52 a.m., a pyroclastic flow swept down the slopes of the volcano, engulfed the town in less than two minutes and reached the harbor. The ships at anchor were struck almost simultaneously: wooden superstructures caught fire, and hulls were set ablaze or capsized by the blast and the tsunami that followed. Most vessels sank within minutes, taking their crews and cargoes with them. Quickly buried in the mud of the harbor, some wrecks remained in a remarkable state of preservation until the first underwater explorations in the 1970s.

== Archaeological research ==
The harbor of Saint-Pierre is now recognized for its significant archaeological value. As the former capital of Martinique, constantly frequented by a large number of ships, it preserves many traces of the past under its waters.

The University of the French Antilles has organized several excavation campaigns in collaboration with the Naval Archeology Research Group (GRAN) and the Laboratory of Medieval and Modern Archeology in the Mediterranean (LA3M). The Department of Subaquatic and Underwater Archaeological Research (DRASSM) of the Ministry of Culture has also carried out prospecting, inventories and geophysical studies of the site.

During its various campaigns, the GRAN established a detailed list of fragments and wrecks in the bay as well as throughout Martinique. The Tamaya, the Biscaye, the Roraima and the Diamant have been definitively identified. The other wrecks have an uncertain identification. In 2023, the ecoRoute project, co-funded by the European Union, was launched in Martinique. Led in the north of the island by the Petites Antilles Archéologie association (AAPA), it aims to promote the wrecks of Saint-Pierre and to create a tourist route around them.

== Amélie / Raisinier ==
The Amélie was a steel three-masted ship from Nantes, a sister ship of the Belem, about 50 m (160 ft) long and 8.5 m (28 ft) wide, of 600 tons. She was built in 1890 at the Sevestre shipyard in Chantenay, on an order from the shipowners Simon and Duteil of Nantes. Having left Marseille, she arrived at Saint-Pierre at the end of April 1902. She sprang a leak while at anchor in the harbor; the crew fought the damage for two days before she was towed to the Anse Turin by the Diamant for repairs, where she finally sank. During its research, GRAN discovered various fragments, including the remains of an iron sailboat, badly damaged by the sea, near Raisinier beach.

The wreck lies at a depth of 12 m (39 ft). It is accessible by snorkeling.

== Biscaye (ex-Gabrielle) ==
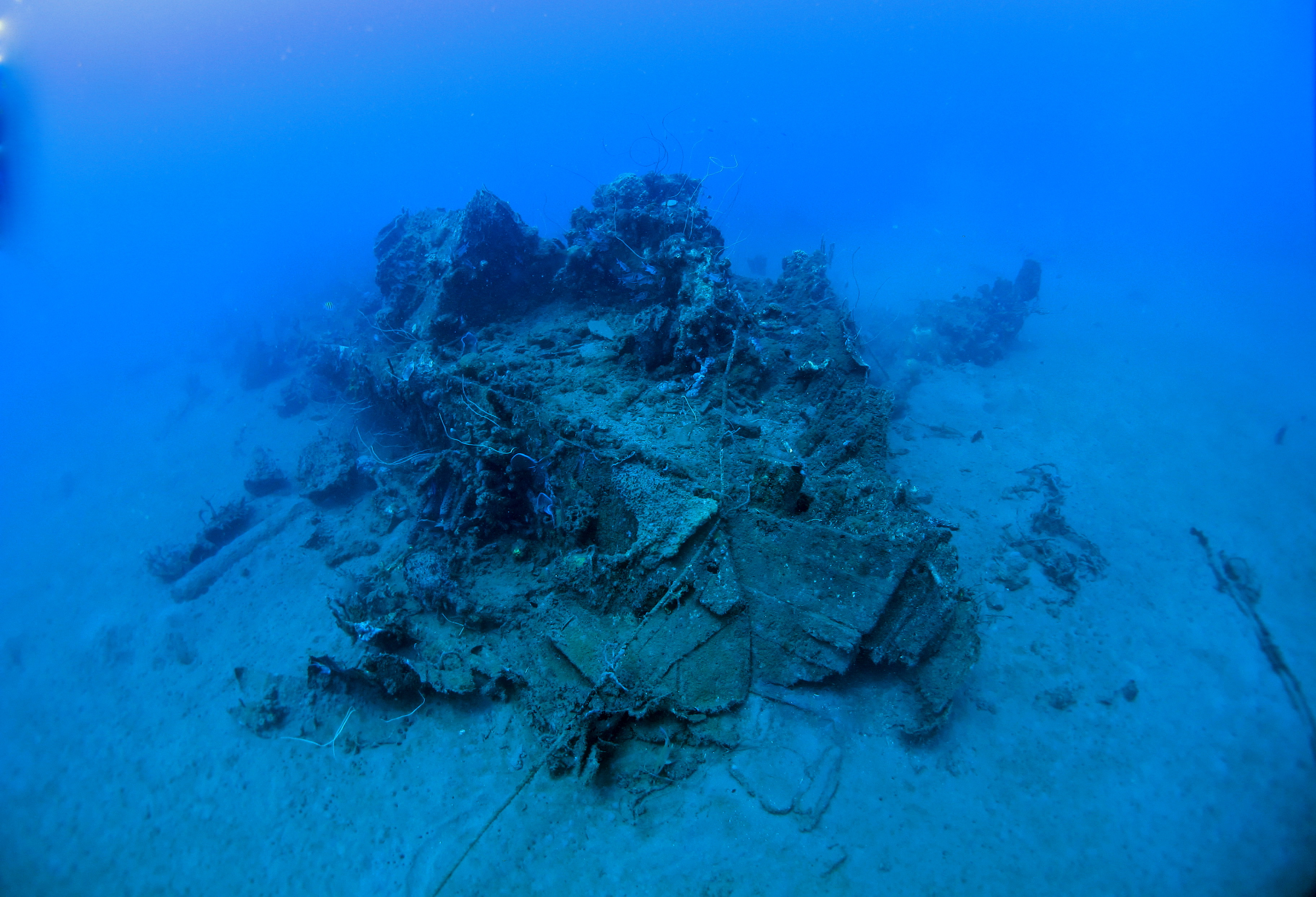
Biscaye, 2023

The Biscaye was a three-masted schooner-rigged sailing ship, built of wood with a hull lined with copper plates. It was built in Bilbao in 1878 by the Mendiguren shipyard, and measured 32 m (105 ft) long by 7 m (23 ft) wide. She was previously named J.A.U. and then Guruchaga hijos.

Fitted out from 1895 by the Vidart et Legasse company of Bayonne, she was under the command of Captain Jules Trévty and had eight crew members. She carried cod and sugar between the Bay of Biscay, Martinique and Saint Pierre and Miquelon. Departing from Bordeaux on February 17, 1902, it reached Saint Pierre and Miquelon before arriving in Saint-Pierre, Martinique with a cargo of 700 barrels of cod on May 6. On May 8, 1902, she sank at anchor in the bay of Saint-Pierre, less than 200 m (660 ft) from the shore, facing Place Bertin. Location 14°44.373′N 61°10.968′W. Archaeological excavations of the wreck revealed the presence of cod barrels.

Due to its construction, it probably caught fire quickly, unless the small tidal wave following the fiery cloud caused it to capsize and sink.

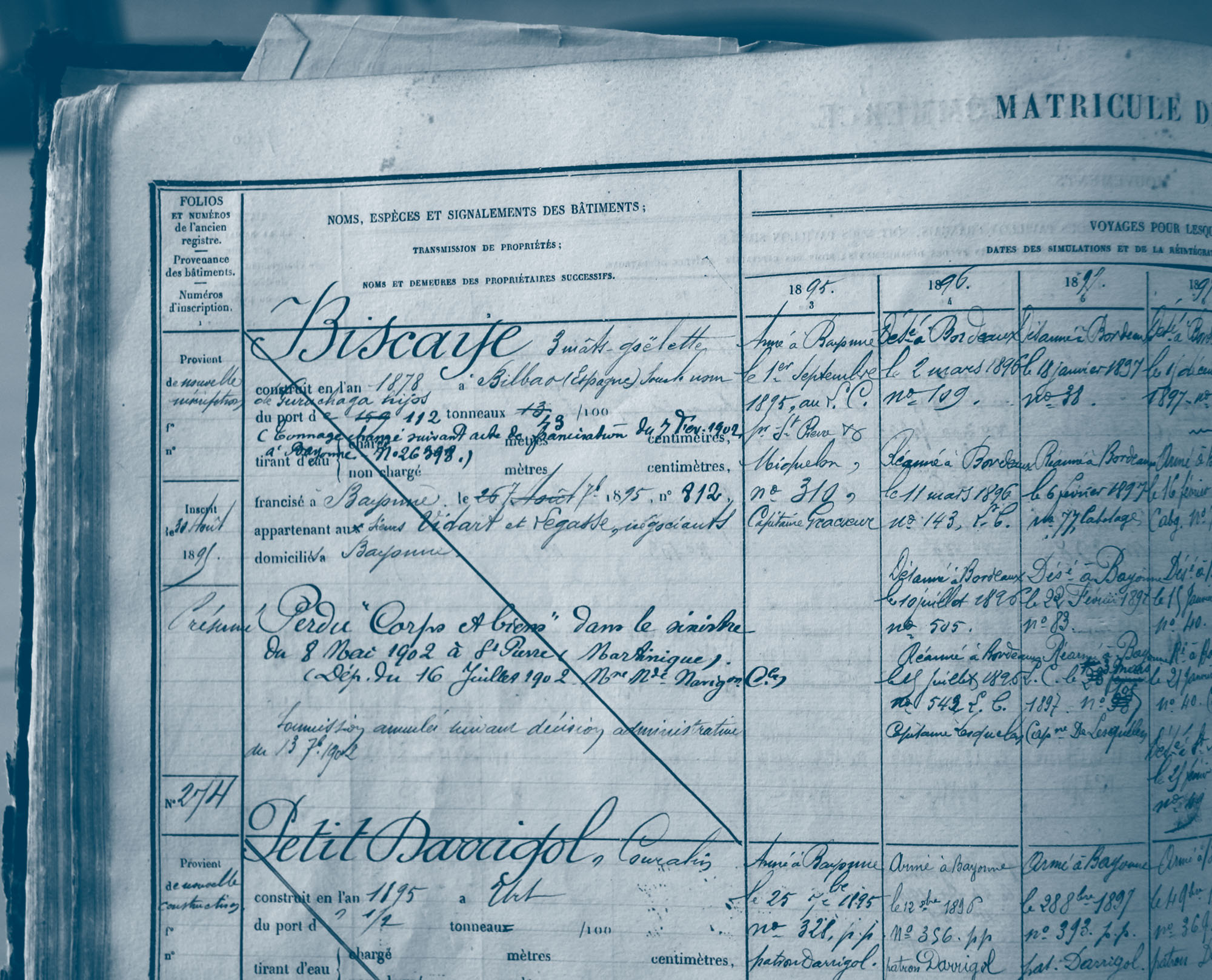
Rochefort-sur-Mer, Naval Archives – registration register 2, page of the Biscaye

The wreck was rediscovered in the 1970s and was initially misidentified as that of the Gabrielle. The wreck measures about 31 m, while the Gabrielle measured only 23 m (75 ft 6 in). Although the Gabrielle was at anchor on May 8, she was not found. GRAN carried out a dedicated survey of the wreck in 1994. Its dive report states the following.

The wreck of a ship, characterized by a copper-lined hull, is located practically in the axis of the Saint-Pierre pontoon. Oriented east-west, with the front facing east, it rests on a slope: the front is 29 m (95 ft) deep and the rear is 39 m (128 ft) deep. The hull is approximately 40 m (130 ft) long. The ship is lying on its port side, clearly revealing its starboard frames and the remains of the planking with the copper sheathing.

The metal rudder, relatively well preserved, emerges one m (3 ft 3 in) from the sand. It has a thickness of 24 centimetres (9.4 in) at the top and a width of 60 cm (24 in). The notch, intended to receive the upper hinge, measures 17 cm (6.7 in) high and is located 8 cm (3.1 in) below the preserved top of the rudder. The ceiling planking measures 7 cm (2.8 in) thick, the frames 17 cm thick and 30 cm (12 in) wide, and the planking 10 cm (3.9 in) wide.

An anchor, approximately 2 m (6 ft 7 in) long, lies to the northeast of the front of the wreck, approximately 20 m (66 ft) away, oriented east–west. It is likely that it belongs to the wreck.

Michel Météry had initially named this wreck Gabrielle, because its position seemed to correspond to that of the Gabrielle anchorage according to Lacroix's book. However, Bureau Veritas records indicate that the Gabrielle of the Knight company, which sank at Saint-Pierre, measured 23 m long, while this wreck measures 31 m.

Three elements lead to the identification of this wreck as the Biscaye:

- The length of the ship.
- The type of sheathing.
- The cargo of fish.

The data is summarized below:

- Length preserved between 29.10 and 31.20 meters.
- Sheathing and bolts in yellow copper alloy.
- During the 1994 survey, a cargo of barrels containing skeletons of gadids (fish of the cod family) was discovered in the bottom of the ship.

Among the ships sunk at Saint-Pierre, only the Biscaye has a length corresponding to these measurements.

== Clémentina ==
The wreck is a hull bottom approximately 20 meters long, belonging to a locally built coaster. This wreck was the victim of several lootings or attempted lootings, which led the Directorate of Antiquities to file several complaints with the gendarmerie. Some objects were saved thanks to these interventions. Not listed on Hydrographic Service documents, it is nevertheless well known to local divers.

Characteristics of the wreck

- Hull: wooden, copper-sheathed, with no propeller aperture; traces of impact at the bow.
- Position: The hull rests on the keel, on a slope covered with mud. The stern rests at a depth of 50 meters (49 meters on the mud at the foot of the rudder) and the bow at 40 meters, giving the boat's axis an angle of 30° to the horizontal (slope of 56%). This axis is oriented at 116°.
- Dimensions: Total length of the hull without the rudder: 20.6 meters. Preserved width: 6.80 meters.

Rudder details

- Material: metal, still in place and clearly visible, protruding 90 cm from the mud.
- Dimensions: width of 75 cm at the top, 87 cm at mud level. Thickness of 17 cm.
- Fixing: The upper rudder fixing hinge is still movable on its axis and still carries its fixing rivets with a diameter of 2 cm. The wooden parts have disappeared, leaving only the metal frames.
- Rudder: The preserved part of the rudder, stern post (31 cm) and counter post (21 cm), does not show any trace of a propeller cage, indicating that it was a sailboat.

Structure and materials

- Shape: preserved by the copper sheathing plates, forming a hollow mold of the hull. On the two front levels, the wood remains visible.
- Scantlings: planking 6 to 7 cm thick, frames 18 × 18 cm, ceiling about 6 cm thick.
- Sheathing plates: the plates at the bow are twisted, probably as a result of an impact. The vessel's modest size suggests a barge or coaster.

Analysis and discoveries

- Wood species: Analysis revealed the use of three different species: spruce for the lining, pine for the frames, birch for the planking. However, it was not possible to determine the exact species or origin of the wood, which may come from Europe or America.
- Objects recovered: a harbor lantern uncovered by illegal digging was saved and placed in storage at the Directorate of Antiquities.

The wreck of the Clémentina remains a subject of significant archaeological interest, providing valuable information on local shipbuilding and maritime practices of the time. Its identification remains to be formally confirmed.

The wreck lies 20 meters deep at 14°44.478′N 61°10.951′W.

== Dahlia / YMS 82 ==
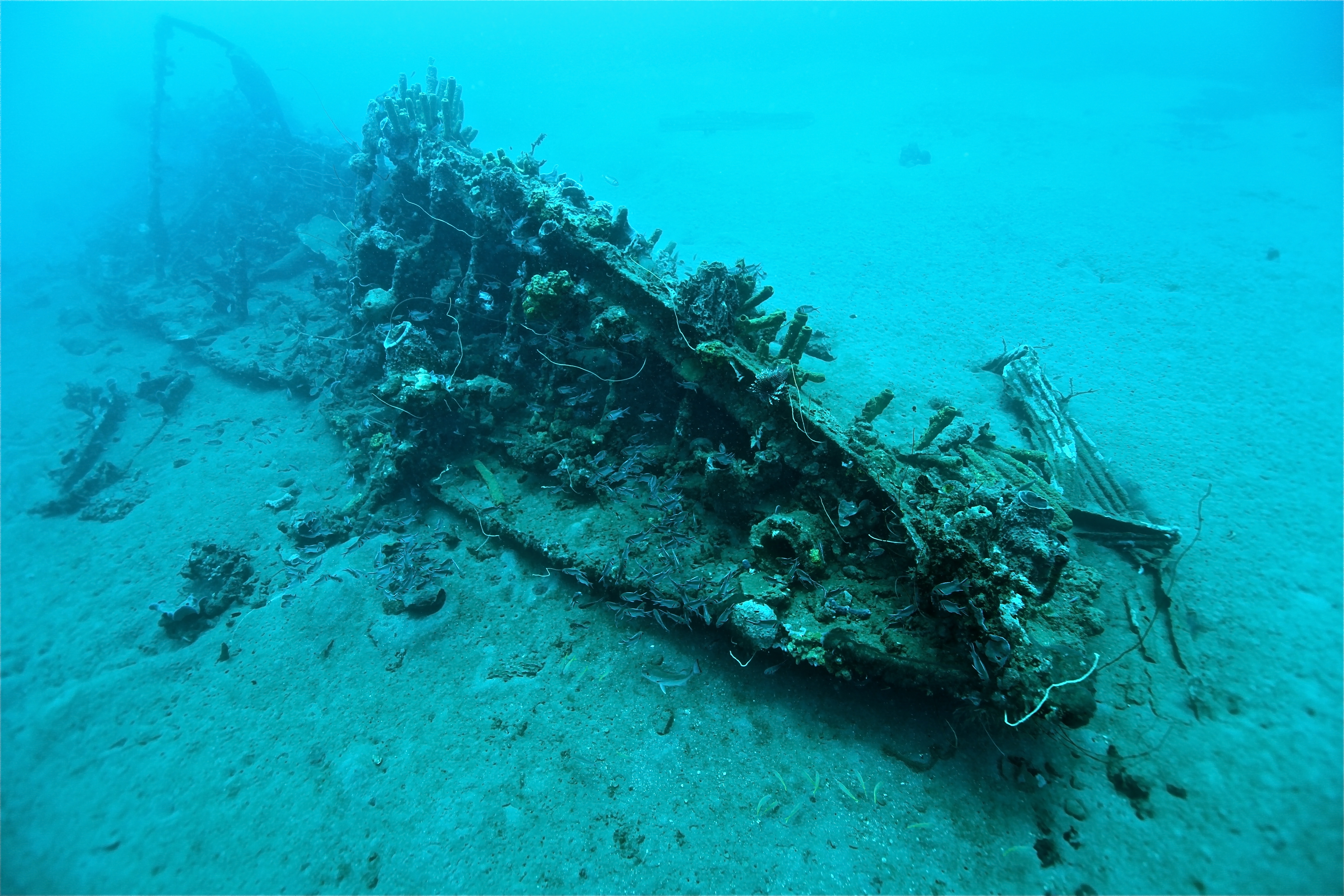
Dahlia in 2023.

Dahlia / Y.M.S. 82, a BYMS-class minesweeper, was laid down on October 24, 1941, at the Stadium Yacht Basin in Cleveland and launched on June 13, 1942. Transferred to the French Navy on October 5, 1944, she was renamed Dahlia and received the pennant number D325, later M645; in keeping with tradition, all the Y.M.S. were named after flowers. On March 21, 1949, the French navy definitively acquired the Dahlia from the U.S. Navy, and the ship continued its career as a minesweeper.

After World War II, French coasts were littered with mines, and minesweepers like the Dahlia were extensively engaged in mine clearance operations. In April 1950, the Dahlia, accompanied by the ships Genet, Pétunia and Zinia, participated in the clearance of the port of La Pallice and the dredging of fishing areas used by La Rochelle trawlers. Subsequently, the Dahlia was sent to the Antilles for stationary service, where she represented France and provided aid to the local population in the event of natural disasters.

On January 29, 1959, the Dahlia was decommissioned and sold to Établissements Gouyer, a construction materials company in Saint-Pierre. The ship was then used for cabotage between the islands of the West Indies, mainly for the transport of materials. While she was in the harbor of Saint-Pierre to be converted, workers accidentally set fire to the wooden hull by clumsily using a blowtorch. In its inventory, the Naval Archeology Research Group (GRAN) references the wreck as fragment FR/M/1/A/019.

Dahlia_/_YMS_82

== Diamant ==
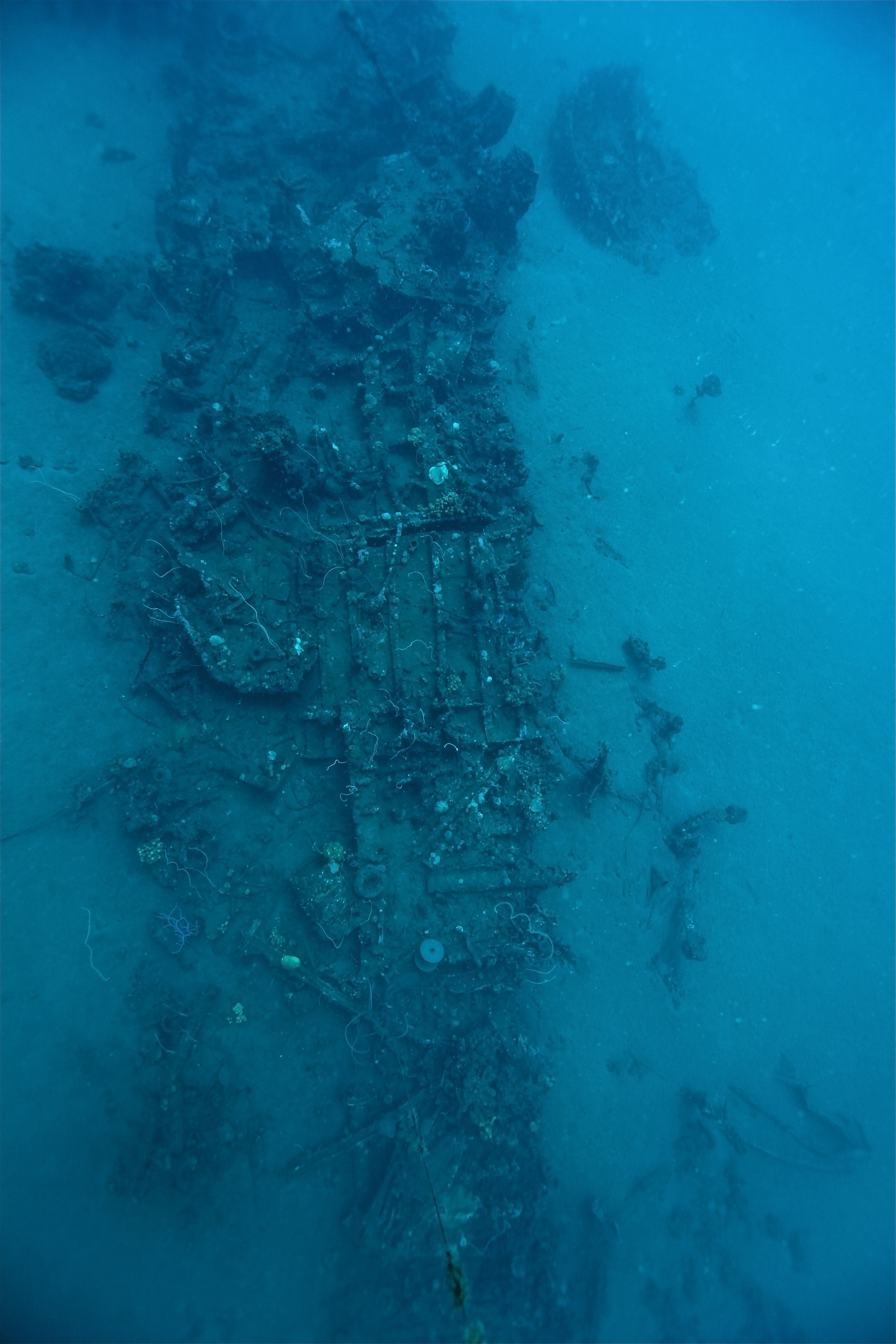
Diamant in 2023.

The Diamant was a steamboat 26 meters long, with a tonnage of 30 tonnes. She was one of a fleet of five small steamers carrying passengers between Fort-de-France and Saint-Pierre. It was operated by the "Steamship Company" managed by Léon Girard. On May 8, 1902, the Diamant arrived from Fort-de-France with eight crew members and around thirty passengers. While lining up to dock at the Saint-Pierre pontoon, the boat was reducing steam when the eruption of Mount Pelée occurred.

Faced with imminent danger, the captain ordered the engines reversed to try to escape the explosion. The inhabitants of Saint-Pierre rushed into the sea to board the Diamant. The ship's boilers, pushed to their limit, exploded under the effort, and the boat immediately sank. Of the forty castaways, only the cabin boy Innocent Jean-Baptiste survived. His story was reported by Césaire Philémon.

The boat was going backwards when it sank with him "without him having seen anything", nor without him being aware of how "he had found himself in the water". He had the presence of mind to "dive several times to avoid being burned in the falling hot ashes." But he felt that his strength was abandoning him and was nevertheless able to "head towards the coast and suddenly found himself dry". After which, he was thrown back into the sea and remained on a wreck until he was rescued by the Suchet. He remembered that the water was warm when he fell into the sea, but as the Diamant's engine had just blown up, we cannot reasonably infer from the rise in temperature of this water that it was the work of the fiery cloud.

The wreck of the Diamant now lies on its starboard side, 30 meters deep. Of the wooden superstructures, only the frames remain.

Location: 14°44.326′N 61°10.938′W

== Diamant's barge ==
Towed by the Diamant, this 15 m (49 ft) barge without an engine rests at a depth of 30 meters.

== False Teresa ==
This wooden wreck, oriented perpendicular to the shore, does not appear to carry a large cargo. She was a three-masted sailing ship 42 meters long; her cargo included barrels of cement and terracotta tiles, and ropes were found on board.

== Nord-America ==
A three-masted barque of 558 tons, built in Buccari in 1881. She flew the Italian flag, with Castellammare di Stabia (Campania) as her home port, and was loading for Bordeaux under Captain Cilento, with a crew of 13. The wreck has not been formally identified.

== Roraima ==
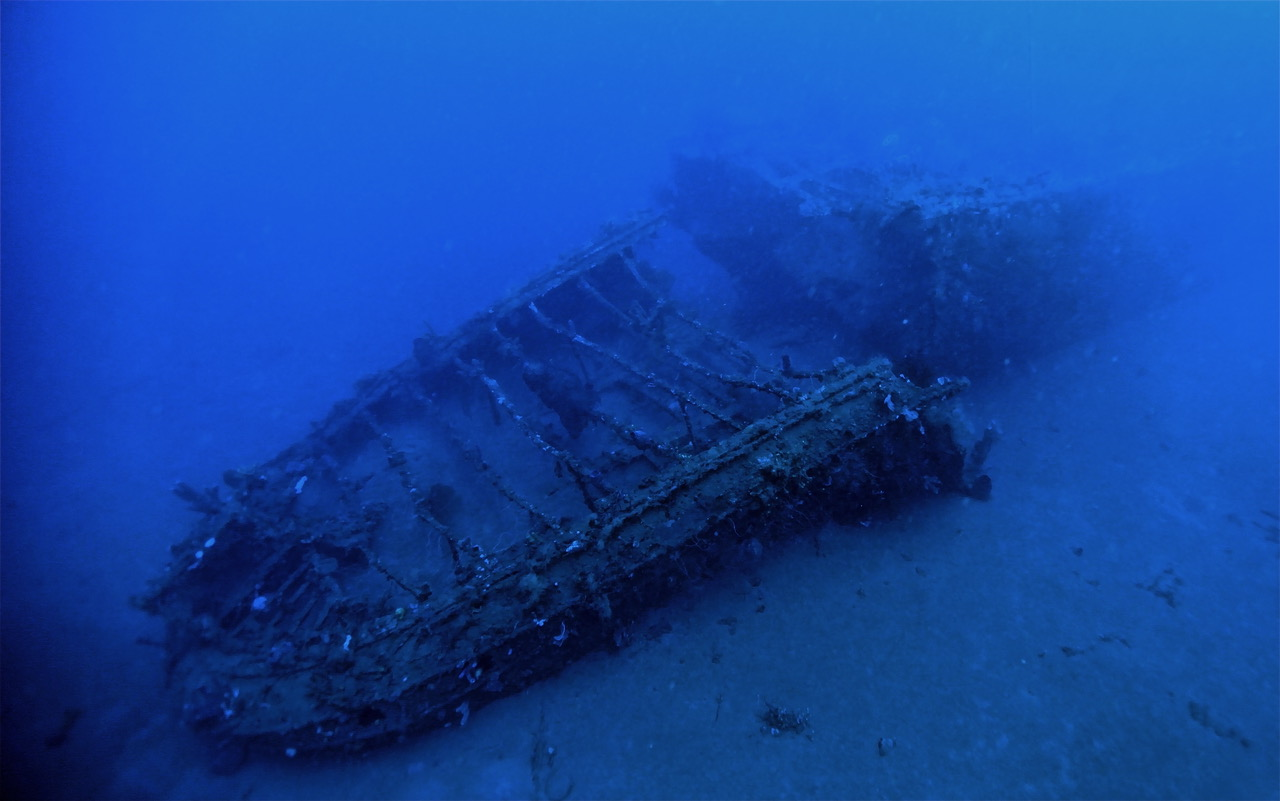
Roraima, 2023

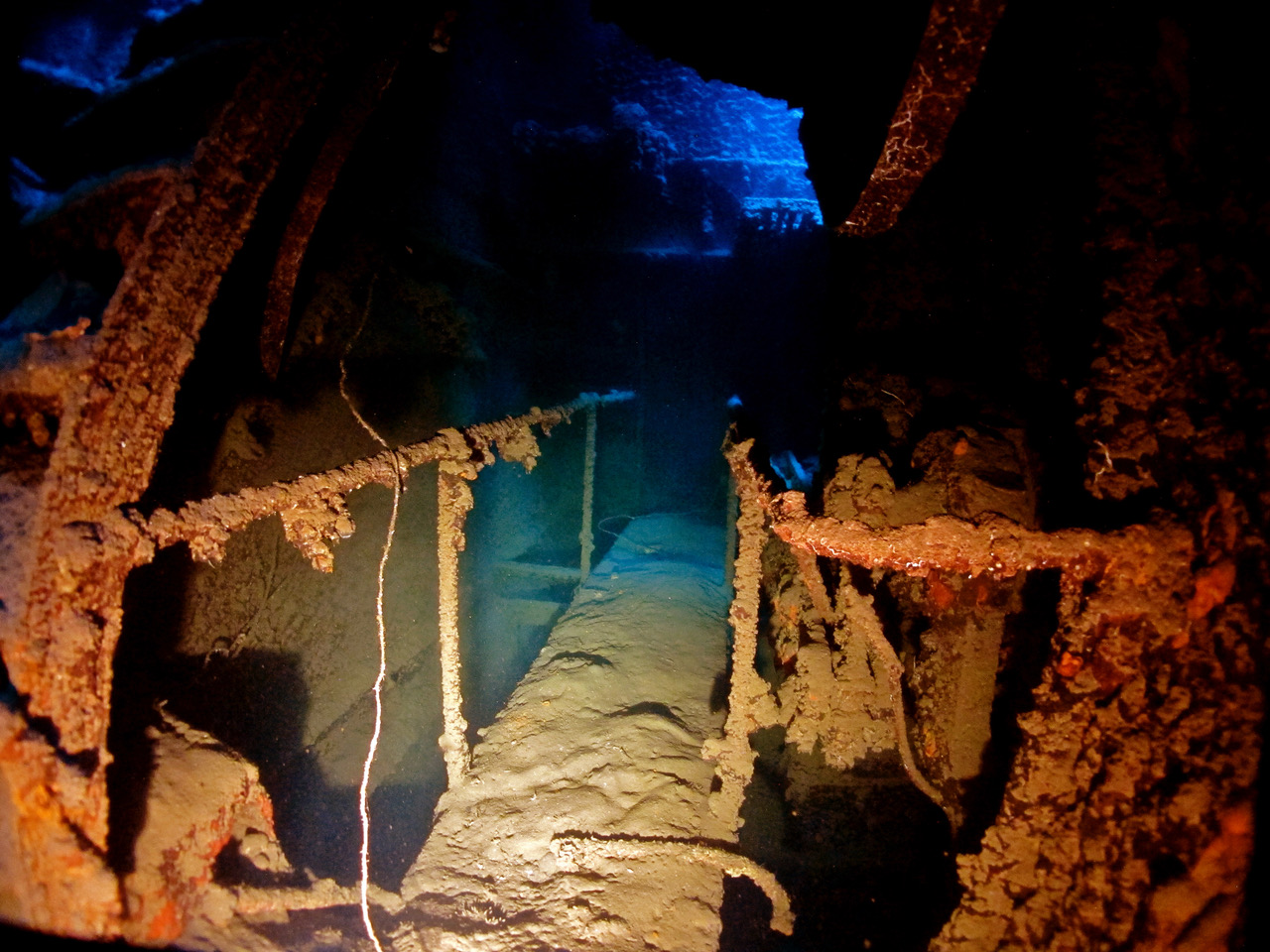
Roraima, 2023

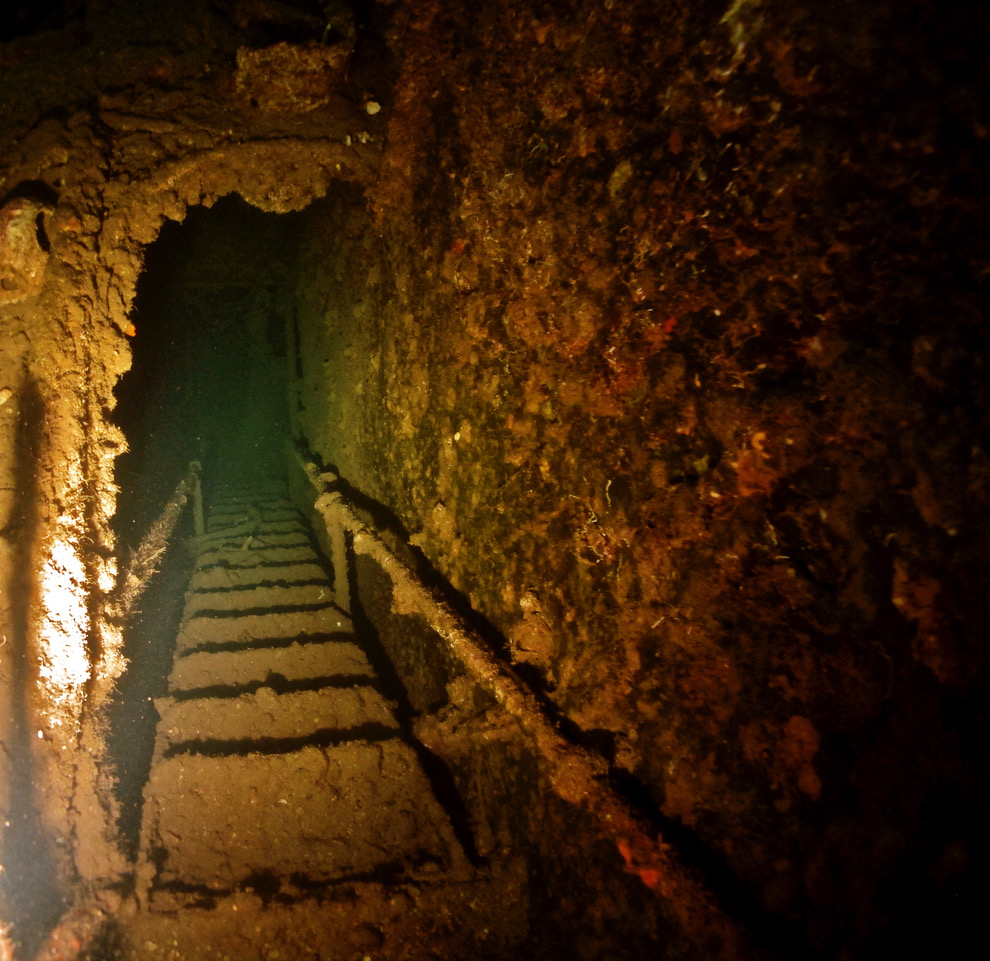
Roraima, 2023

A combined steam and sail ship of 2,712 gross register tons, commanded by Captain Muggah, she was built in 1883 as the Ghazee at the Aitken & Mansel shipyard, in the Whiteinch district of Glasgow on the River Clyde. It was launched on June 5, 1883. The ship, built of iron, measured 103.63 meters long, 11.64 meters wide and had a draft of six meters. It was powered by two-cylinder low-pressure steam engines from John & James Thomson and Company of Glasgow, and could produce up to 350 horsepower.

The Roraima and its cargo of potassium continued to burn for three days before sinking on May 11, 1902. Of the 68 people on board, only eleven, most of them seriously injured, survived after being taken aboard the French cruiser Suchet. Clara King, the black nanny of the wealthy Stokes family of Brooklyn, survived with eight-year-old Marguerite Hamilton Stokes ("Rita"). Rita's mother, Mary, as well as her brothers and sisters Eric (4 years old) and Olga (3 years old) were killed. The remaining survivors were members of the crew. They were taken from Saint Kitts to New York by the Korona.

The wreck lies between 50 and 60 meters deep. Location: 14°44.31′N 61°11.048′W

Roraima (boat)

== Tamaya ==
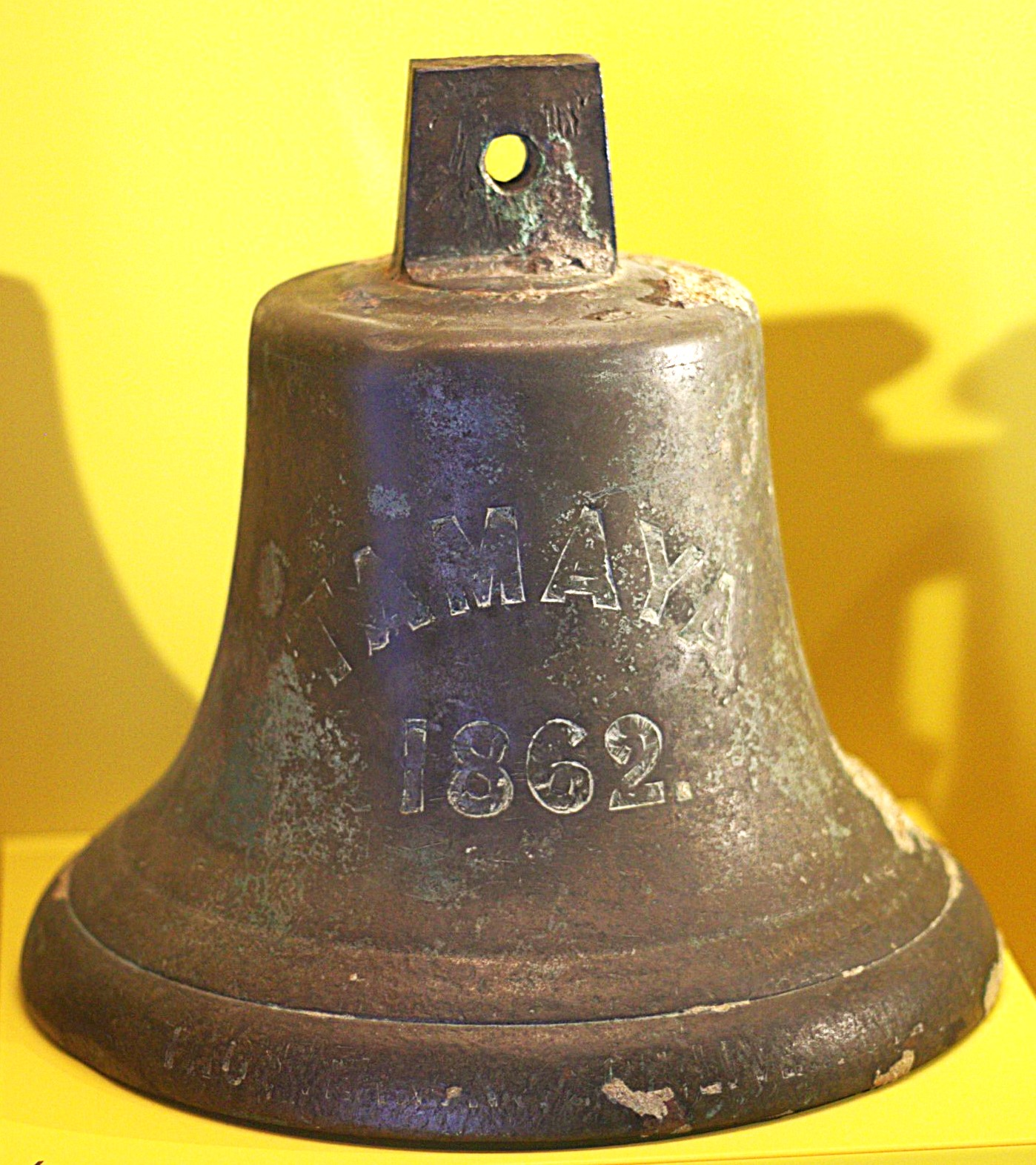
Tamaya's bell, 1862.

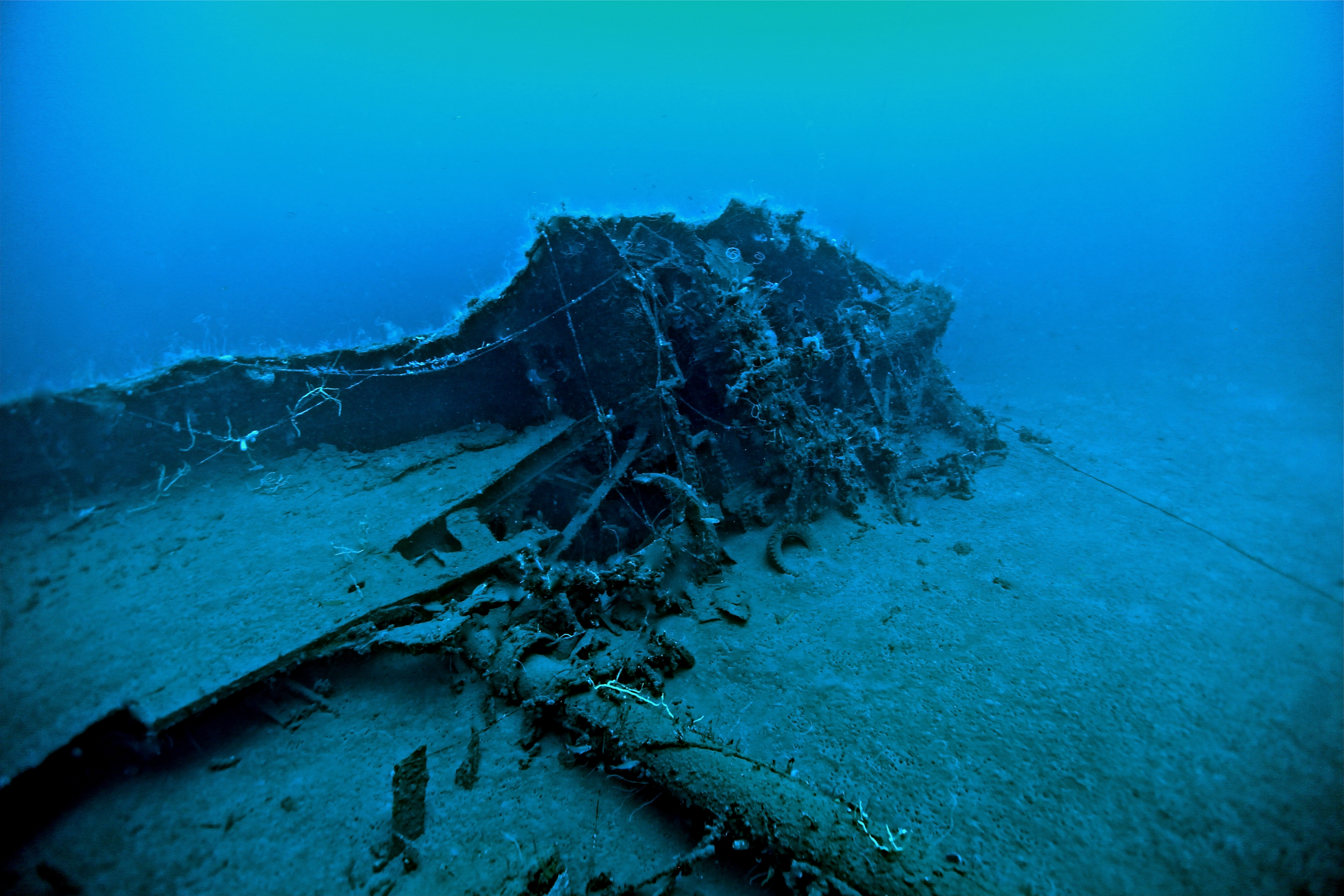
Tamaya, 2023

A sturdy Cape Horner, the Tamaya was a three-masted square-rigged ship of 566 gross register tons, 162 feet (52.80 m) long and 8.15 meters wide, built of iron with two decks in 1862 at Liverpool. She was registered for ocean-going trade under number 356, bought in 1894 and fitted out by Pitre Rozier, a shipowner from Nantes. Departing from Nantes on February 18, 1902, for Martinique under number 106, it arrived in Martinique on April 27, 1902, and sank on May 8. She was not as lucky as the Belem, which that day, for lack of space, had to anchor at Le Robert. She was struck off the merchant navy register on July 21, 1902.

The wreck was first dived on March 21, 1983, by Marc Balssa, Thierry Cardix, Yvon Fredonie and Dominique Serafini, after being located the same year by the magnetometer of the oceanographic ship D'Entrecasteaux. Michel Météry is one of its official discoverers.

The Tamaya is one of the few wrecks in the harbor to have been formally identified, thanks to a bell bearing the inscription "Tamaya 1862", brought back to the surface in 1983 by Thierry Cardix and Marc Balssa. The bell was given to the Frank A. Perret Museum in Saint-Pierre.

Crew:

- Théophile Mahéo, born August 30, 1860, in Île-aux-Moines, Commander.
- Charles Le Cerf, second captain.
- Joseph Subject, boatswain.
- Gabriel Le Ian, cook.
- Jean Goubeyre, Michel Gallard, Yacinthe Lab, Pierre Rouxel, J.-Marie Peyraud, Alexis Auvray, Frédéric Mallert, Pierre Gallapel, Raymond Crequier (cabin boy)

The wreck lies between 78 and 85 meters deep, next to a steep drop-off. It cannot be reached on air: divers must use mixed gases (technical diving).

Location: 14°44.18′N 61°11.242′W

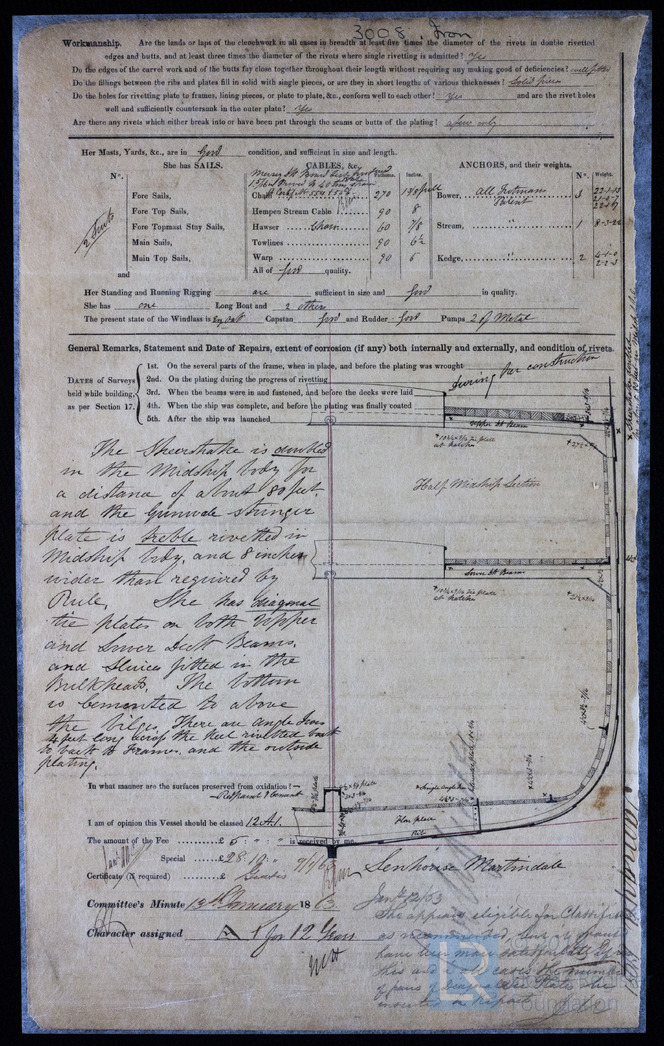

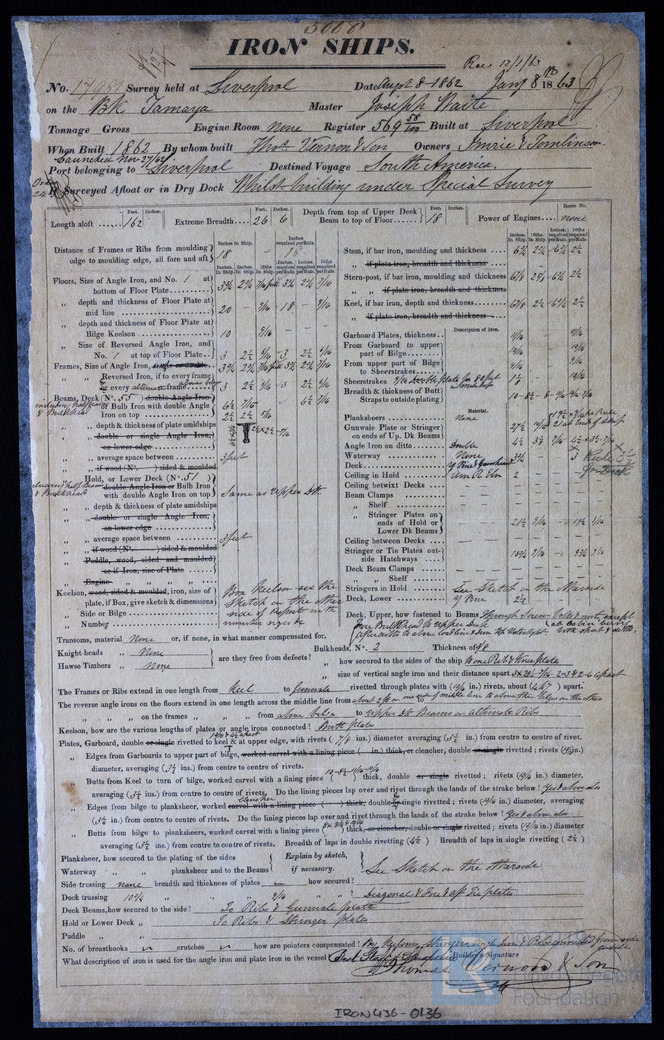

Tamaya (boat)

== Teresa Lo Vigo ==
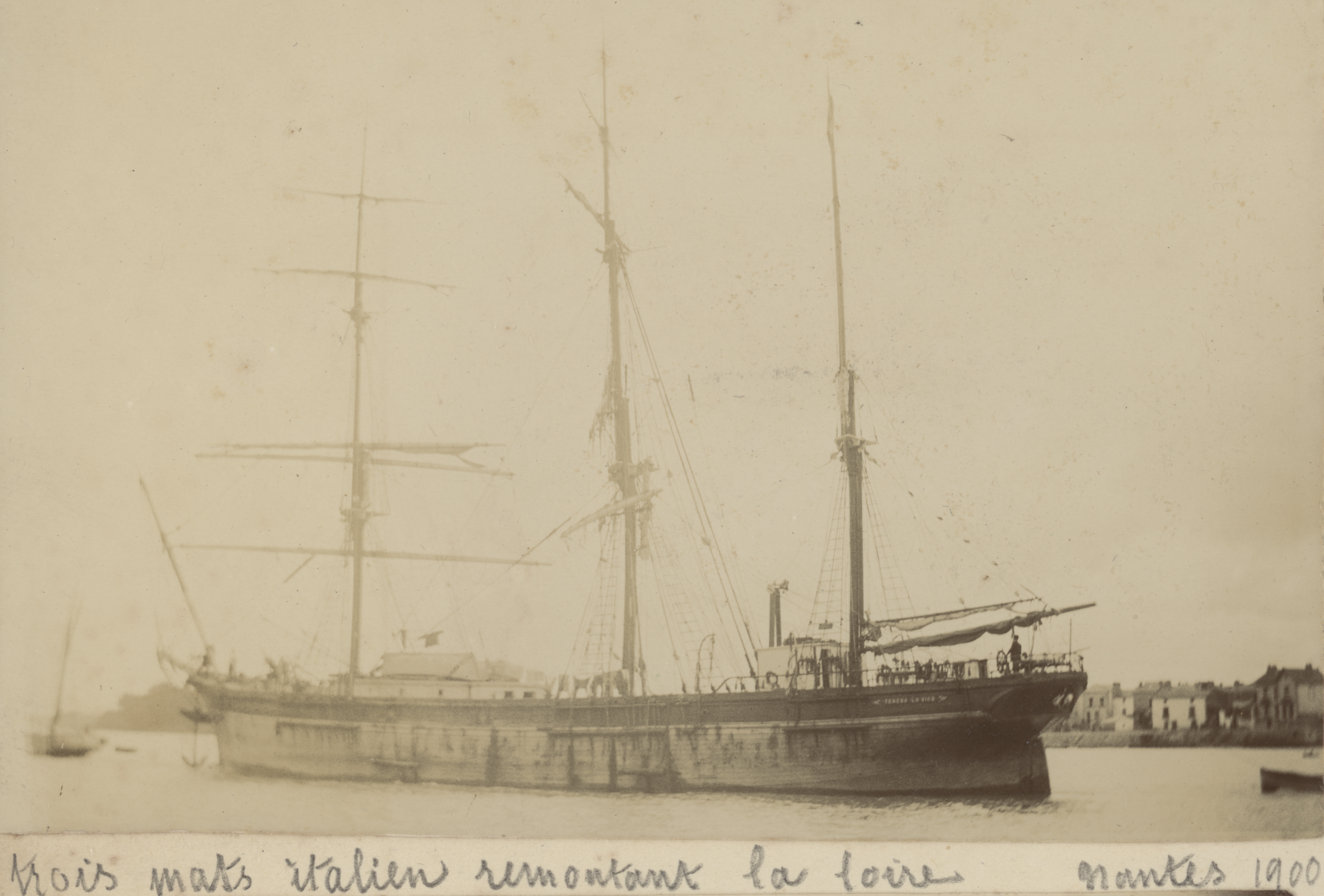
Three-master sailboat Teresa Lo Vigo at Nantes, in 1900

A wooden sailing ship with a copper-sheathed hull, built at Sestri (Italy) in 1874, with a capacity of 585 tons. At the time of the disaster she was anchored 50 meters from the shore, at the bottom of the rue d'Orange, at the southern end of the town. She now rests in the mud at a depth of 30 to 40 meters. She was carrying tiles and various construction materials (rope, cement in barrels, lead piping) intended for the town of Saint-Pierre. Despite its advanced state of disrepair, the wreck is still complete with its cargo and a significant quantity of pottery, some of which shows signs of deformation by heat.

The wreck is located almost parallel to the coast. It was the subject of an archaeological survey in April and May 1992, which helped researchers better understand its structure and cargo. Analysis of the wood revealed the presence of different species:

- Deciduous oak (Quercus sp.): used for keel, frames and lining.
- Spruce or larch (Picea sp. or Larix sp.): used for a plank supported along the keel.
- Spruce (Picea sp.): used for a lining repair board.

The wreck is a popular diving site for its submerged "treasure" (coiled ropes, bottles of wine, barrels of rum), which offers a poignant testimony to maritime history and the natural disaster that struck the region. At around 40 meters, the wreck is a dive for experienced divers only.

In La Montagne Pelée et ses éruptions, Alfred Lacroix reports the testimony of Jean-Louis Prudent, engineer on board the Teresa Lo Vigo: around 8 a.m. he saw an enormous purplish mass, without flames, leave the crater and sweep towards the town; darkness fell at once. Burned only on his exposed skin, he jumped into the sea, clung to an empty boat, hauled into it his wife, his maid, the captain's wife and nine injured sailors (the captain was dead), and reached Le Carbet, where they were picked up by the Suchet. He insisted that the sea water was not hot.

Location: 14°44.132′N 61°10.9′W

== Italian yacht ==
A wooden, copper-sheathed hull broken into three fragments. Only part of the starboard side of the bow has been preserved over a length of approximately 10 meters. The planking measures 10 cm thick, the frames measure 23 x 22 cm, and the lining measures 10 cm thick. At the front of the wreck is a small winch, next to a large mass of concretion over 2 meters high.

The wreck lies on a slope with a 20% inclination, with its front facing up the slope. The axis of the bow is approximately oriented at 10°. Copper lining plates are visible on the starboard side. Analysis of the wood samples (planking, ribs, lining) revealed that they are made of oak, although the quality of conservation did not make it possible to specify their origin. The strong section of some structural parts suggests that it was a commercial sailboat. In the seventies, when Michel Météry wrote his book, the wreck was in much better condition, and there is no longer any trace today of the base of the masts that he precisely described.

Nearby is a large metal crate.

The wreck lies at depths varying between 20 and 40 meters. Although the site is in an advanced state of degradation, it still offers valuable information on wooden shipbuilding and maritime trade of the time.

Location: 14°44.525′N 61°10.919′W

== Other missing ships ==
Other ships were present on the day of the volcanic eruption, and have not yet been found.

=== Adélaïde, Mario Virginia ===
The Adélaïde, a German three-masted ship that came from Hamburg, and the Italian sailing ship Mario Virginia were lost and have yet to be found.

=== Gabrielle ===
The Gabrielle, a French schooner from the Knight trading house, owned by the senator of Martinique, was anchored in front of the warehouses on Place Bertin. She was dismasted by a wave, began to list and finally sank. With her hawsers cast off, she is said to have drifted between two waters, kept afloat by the empty barrels of her cargo. Her second captain, Mr. Georges Marie-Sainte, was transported alive to the hospital in Fort-de-France by the Suchet.

=== Grappler ===
This English steamboat commanded by A.J. Boreham was insured for US$531,000. She was one of two ships, with the Campbell, specialized in repairing the submarine cables which maintained the Guadeloupe - Martinique telegraph line. This ship, being the closest to the coast, would have been overturned before sinking. Its wreckage has never been located. It is known that it carried copper cables, but it is also said that she was loaded with all the gold of the city and the rich planters who were preparing to flee. The Grappler's treasure continues to fuel the imagination.

=== Sacrocuore di Pompei ===
The Sacrocuore di Pompei, a sailing ship from Naples, weighing 558 tons, with a crew of 14, loading for Marseille (shipowner Mr. Lubrano in Marseille) was also in the harbor.

=== Anna Morse, Korona, Arama ===
In the harbor, there were other ships which were never found or identified. These include the Anna Morse, the Korona, and the Arama.

== Other ships linked to the disaster ==
Many ships were in the area during the volcanic eruption, but the following did not sink during the eruption.

While the Diamant sank in Saint-Pierre during the disaster, the Rubis and the Topaze, two other ships providing the connection between Fort-de-France and Saint-Pierre, were saved.

=== Belem ===
The Belem, a sailboat very similar to the Tamaya, was to anchor that day in the harbor. The Tamaya was anchored at the location planned for the Belem. Due to a lack of space, its captain, Mr. Chauvelon, had to decide to anchor at Robert (Martinique). The ship was covered in ash and stones; her upper works suffered some damage and were coated with a thick, caustic mud, as hard as mortar. After the eruption, it rescued a few survivors of the disaster.

=== Bonne Mère ===
The Bonne Mère was not identified in the harbor. Only the bell with the inscription "Bonne Mère Paimpol 1878" was found by Sylvie Quemere on January 15, 2012, at a depth of three meters off the beach in the harbor. The bell is kept for restoration by the regional cultural affairs directorate (DRAC). In the maritime archives of Brest is a reference to the sale of the Bonne Mère in Martinique on June 5, 1890.

=== Orsolina ===
The Neapolitan captain of the Italian ship the Orsolina, who had witnessed the beginning of the eruption and the engulfment of the Guérin factory, knew Vesuvius and was wary of the volcano. Despite the threat of formidable penalties, he was saved by his decision to weigh anchor for Nantes on the night of May 7–8.

He went to customs to ask for his papers to weigh anchor. "Impossible," he was told, "your loading is not finished, your papers are not ready..." — "Well! I will leave without papers..."

He was threatened with formidable penalties.

"Who will apply them to me," he said. "You?... But tomorrow, you will all be dead!...

=== Pouyer-Quertier ===
The Pouyer-Quertier, a French cable ship eight miles from Saint-Pierre, suffered only minor damage. Its commander sent the following message at 8:03 a.m.:

S.O.S. ST-PIERRE DESTROYED BY ERUPTION MONTAGNE PELEE S.O.S.

After the disaster, she took part with the Suchet and the Valkyrien in rescuing the inhabitants of Saint-Pierre, Le Prêcheur and Le Carbet.

=== Roddam ===
The Roddam, commanded by Mr. Edward Freeman, was a British ship that had anchored the furthest out in the harbor. She weighed anchor when her crew saw the burning cloud fall on Saint-Pierre, and reached Saint Lucia, a neighbouring island, almost completely burned, with only two men on deck and the captain himself injured. None of them survived. On his arrival, Commander Freeman declared:

We have come from the gates of hell; you can telegraph to the world that there is not a soul alive in Saint-Pierre.

=== Suchet ===
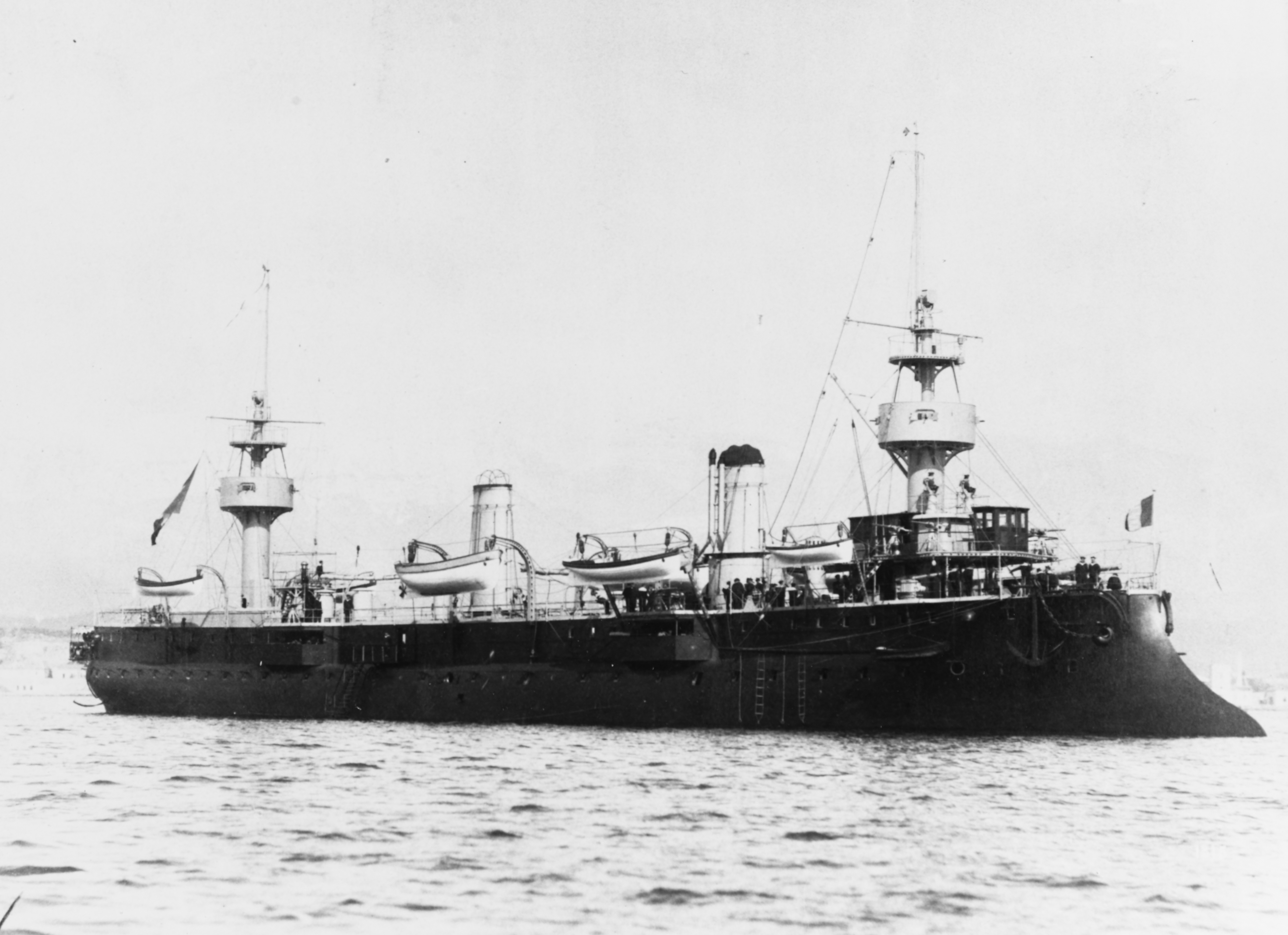
The cruiser Suchet

The French cruiser Suchet was a protected cruiser of the French Navy, launched in 1893 in Toulon. The Rubis, returning from Saint-Pierre, warned the crew of the Suchet in Fort-de-France that the city was on fire. The Suchet rescued the survivors of the town of Saint-Pierre at 1 p.m. on May 8. The ship's captain Pierre Ange Marie Le Bris, commanding the Suchet, sent a telegram to the Ministry of the Navy in Paris on May 8, 1902, at 9:55 p.m.:

Returning from Saint-Pierre, town completely destroyed by mass of fire around 8 a.m. Presume entire population wiped out. Brought back a few survivors, about thirty. All ships in the harbor burned and lost. Volcanic eruption continues. I am leaving for Guadeloupe to get food.

Under the orders of Governor Louis Mouttet, the Suchet should have been in the harbor at the time of the eruption; she owed her escape to work in her engine and boiler rooms in preparation for a voyage to Havana. With the Valkyrien and the Pouyer-Quertier, she rescued about 1,000 people on May 8 and 2,400 more the next day.

=== Valkyrien ===
The Danish cruiser HDMS Valkyrien (1888) took part, with the Suchet and the Pouyer-Quertier, in the rescue of the populations of the coast after the disaster.

== Filmography ==
- Fortune de mer, Jacques Cousteau's team, 1979.
