= Saint-Pierre, Martinique =

Saint-Pierre
- Subprefecture and commune
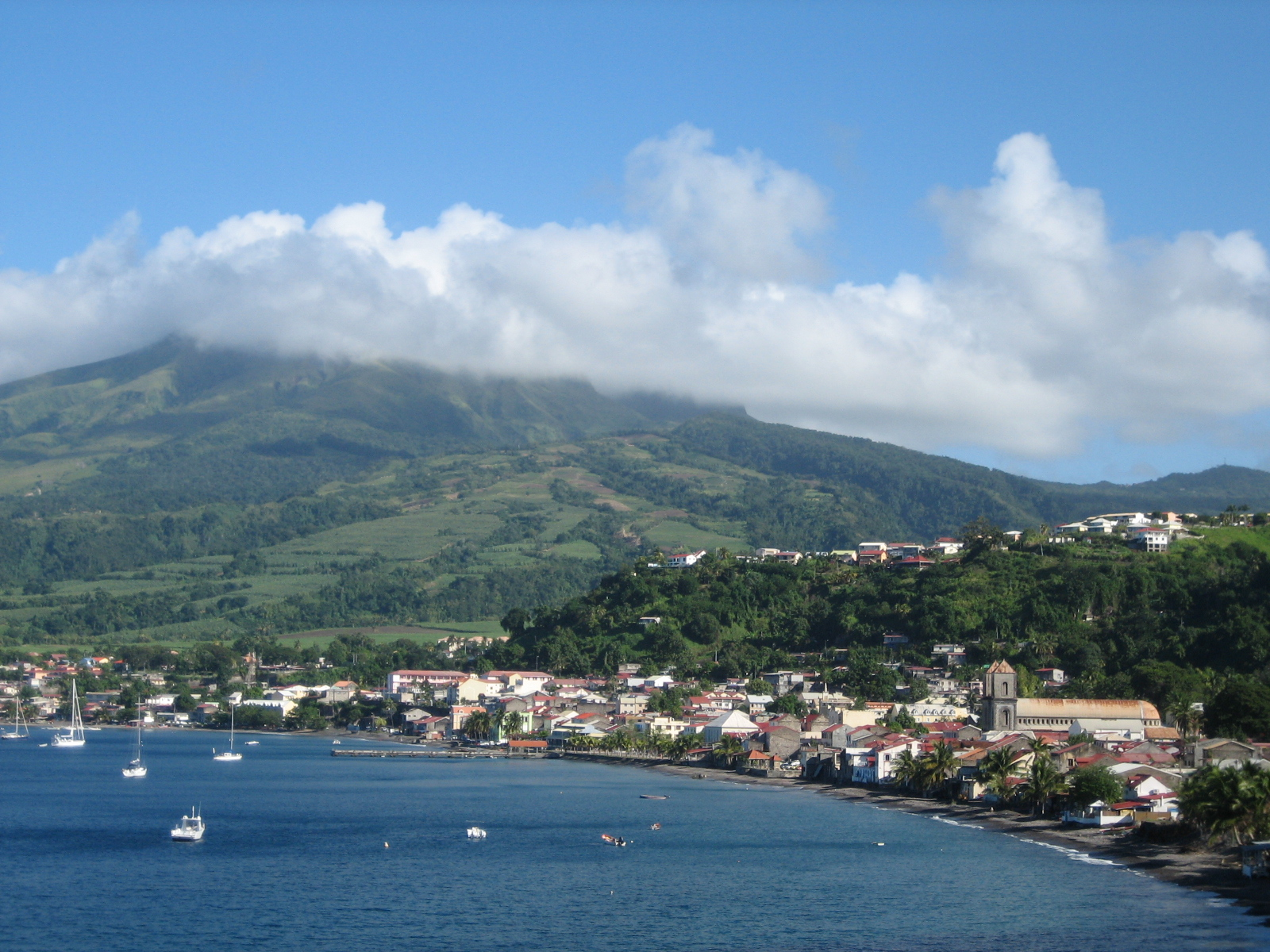
- Saint-Pierre, with Mount Pelée in the background

- Coat of arms

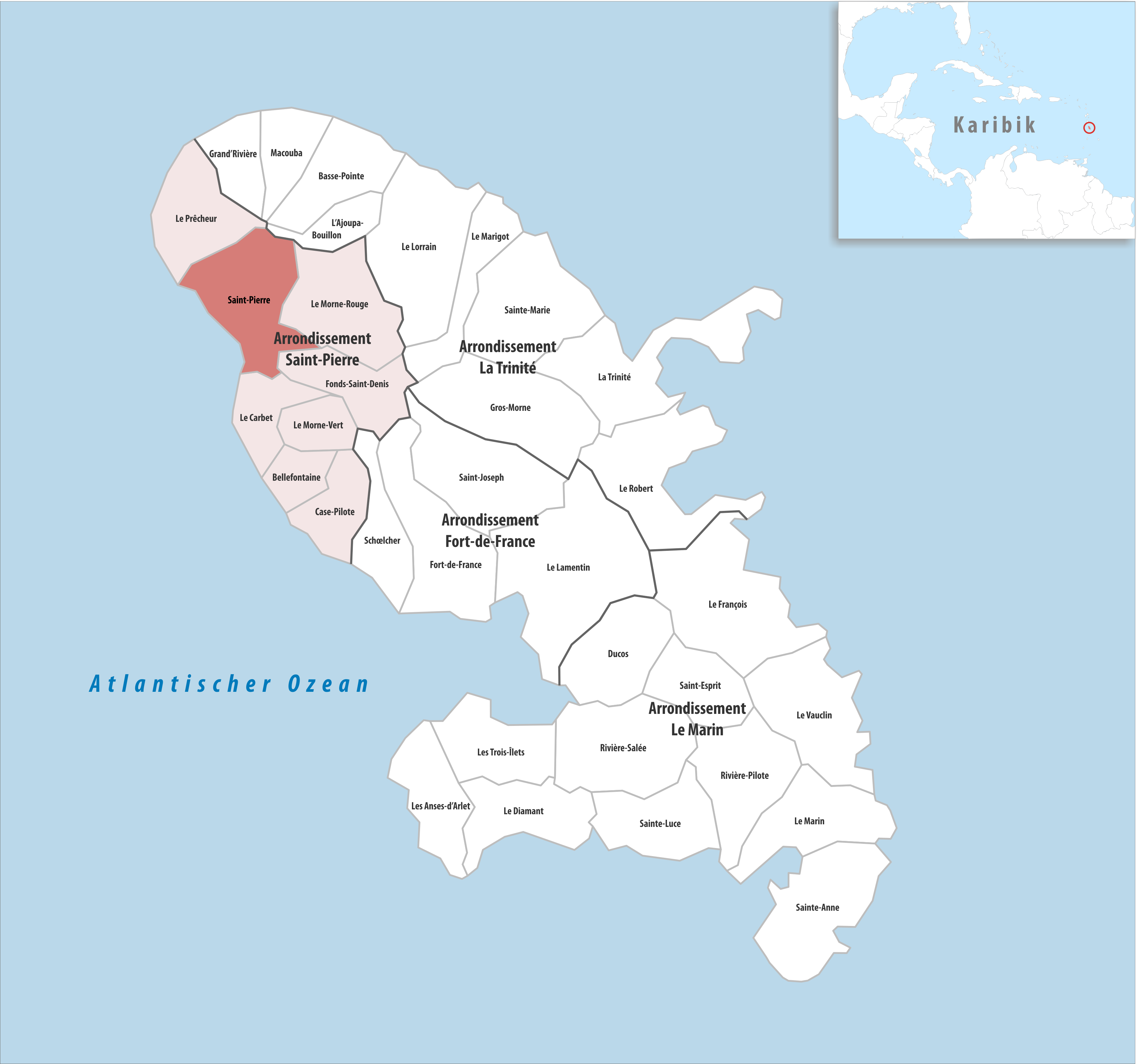
- Location of the commune (in red) within Martinique
- Location of Saint-Pierre
- Coordinates: 14°44′30″N 61°10′33″W
- Country: France
- Overseas region and department: Martinique
- Arrondissement: Saint-Pierre
- Intercommunality: CA Pays Nord Martinique

Government
  - Mayor (2020–2026): Christian Rapha
- Area^{1}: 38.72 km^{2} (14.95 sq mi)
- Highest elevation: 1,397 m (4,583 ft)
- Lowest elevation: 0 m (0 ft)
- Population (2023): 3,961
  - Density: 102.3/km^{2} (265.0/sq mi)
- Time zone: UTC−04:00 (AST)
- INSEE/Postal code: 97225 /97250
- ^{1} French Land Register data, which excludes lakes, ponds, glaciers > 1 km^{2} (0.386 sq mi or 247 acres) and river estuaries.

Saint-Pierre (/ˌseɪnt piˈɛər/, /ˌsæ̃-/; French pronunciation: [sɛ̃ pjɛʁ]; Martinican Creole: Senpiè) is a town and commune of France's Caribbean overseas department of Martinique, founded in 1635 by Pierre Belain d'Esnambuc. Before the total destruction of Saint-Pierre by a volcanic eruption in 1902, it was the most important city of Martinique culturally and economically, being known as "the Paris of the Caribbean". While Fort-de-France was the official administrative capital, Saint-Pierre was the cultural capital of Martinique. After the disaster, Fort-de-France grew in economic importance.

== History ==
Saint-Pierre was founded in 1635 by Pierre Belain d'Esnambuc, a French trader and adventurer, as part of the early colonial establishment of Martinique by the Compagnie des Îles de l'Amérique. It quickly developed into an important settlement and port due to its sheltered bay and strategic position within Caribbean trade routes.

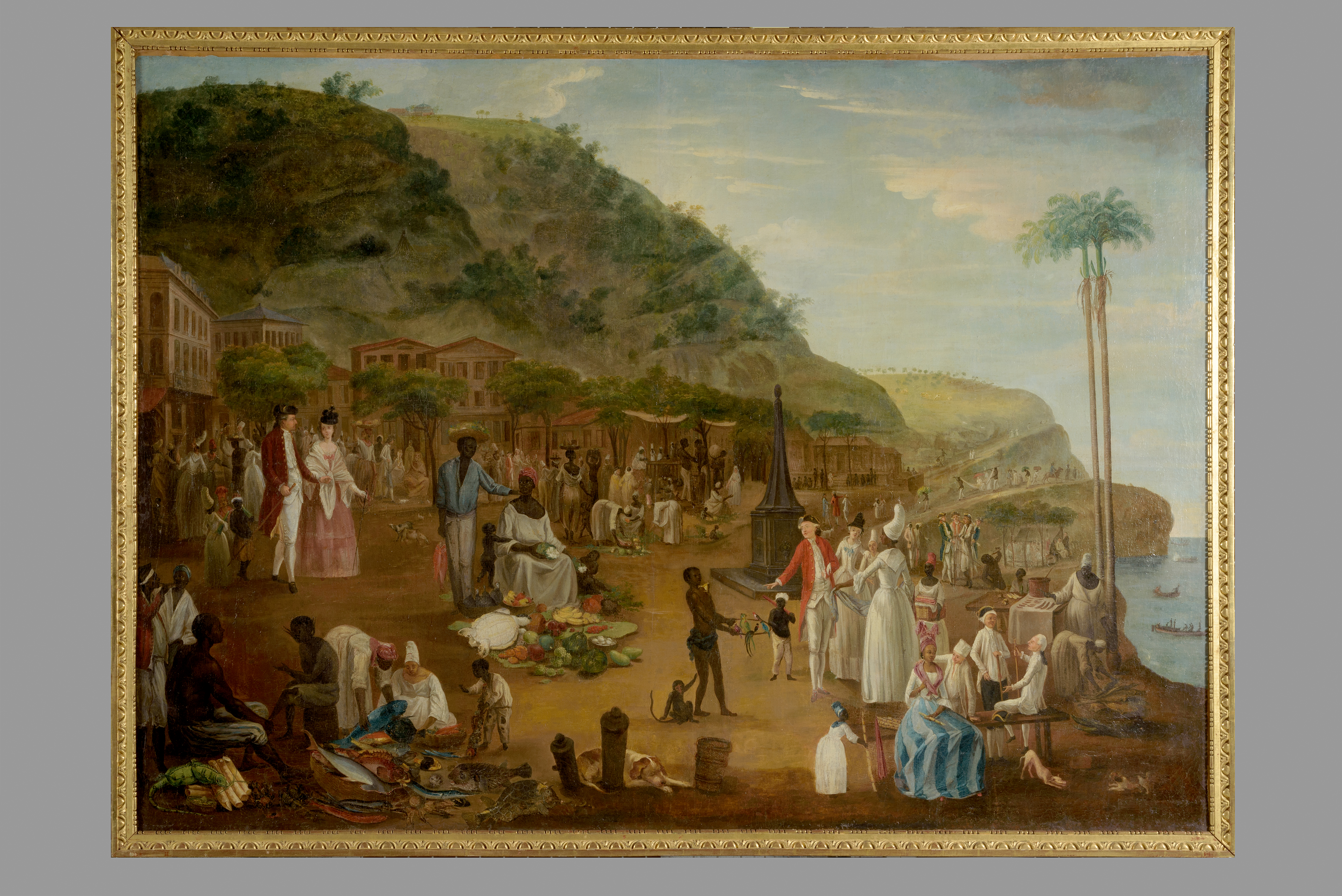
Saint-Pierre market scene (early 19th century depiction)

=== Rise as colonial capital ===
During the 18th century, Saint-Pierre became the principal town of Martinique and its de facto capital. It developed as the administrative, commercial, and maritime centre of the colony, with a port economy based on sugar and coffee exports produced on surrounding plantations.

The city was severely affected by the Great Hurricane of 1780, one of the deadliest Atlantic hurricanes on record. A storm surge of approximately 8 metres (25 ft) inundated the city, destroying much of its infrastructure and causing widespread loss of life, including an estimated 9,000 deaths on Martinique. The city was subsequently rebuilt and regained its position as the island’s principal urban centre.

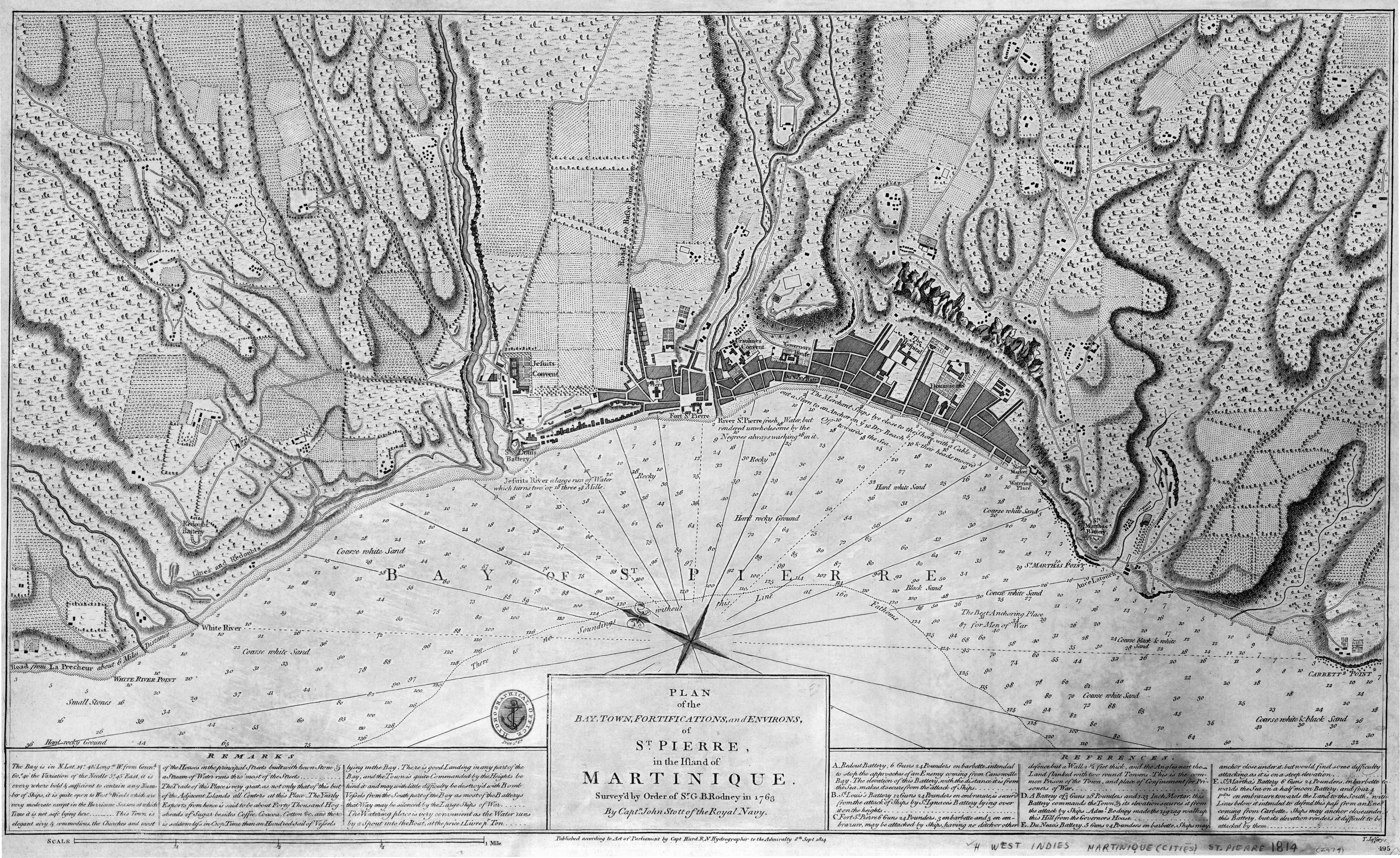
Saint-Pierre harbour and fortifications (1814 Admiralty chart)

=== 19th-century peak ===
In the 19th century, Saint-Pierre reached the height of its development and was widely described as the "Paris of the Caribbean" due to its cultural life, architecture, and commercial importance. It featured theatres, cafés, newspapers, and a busy port handling much of Martinique’s trade. However, it also remained socially stratified, with wealth concentrated among plantation owners and merchants.

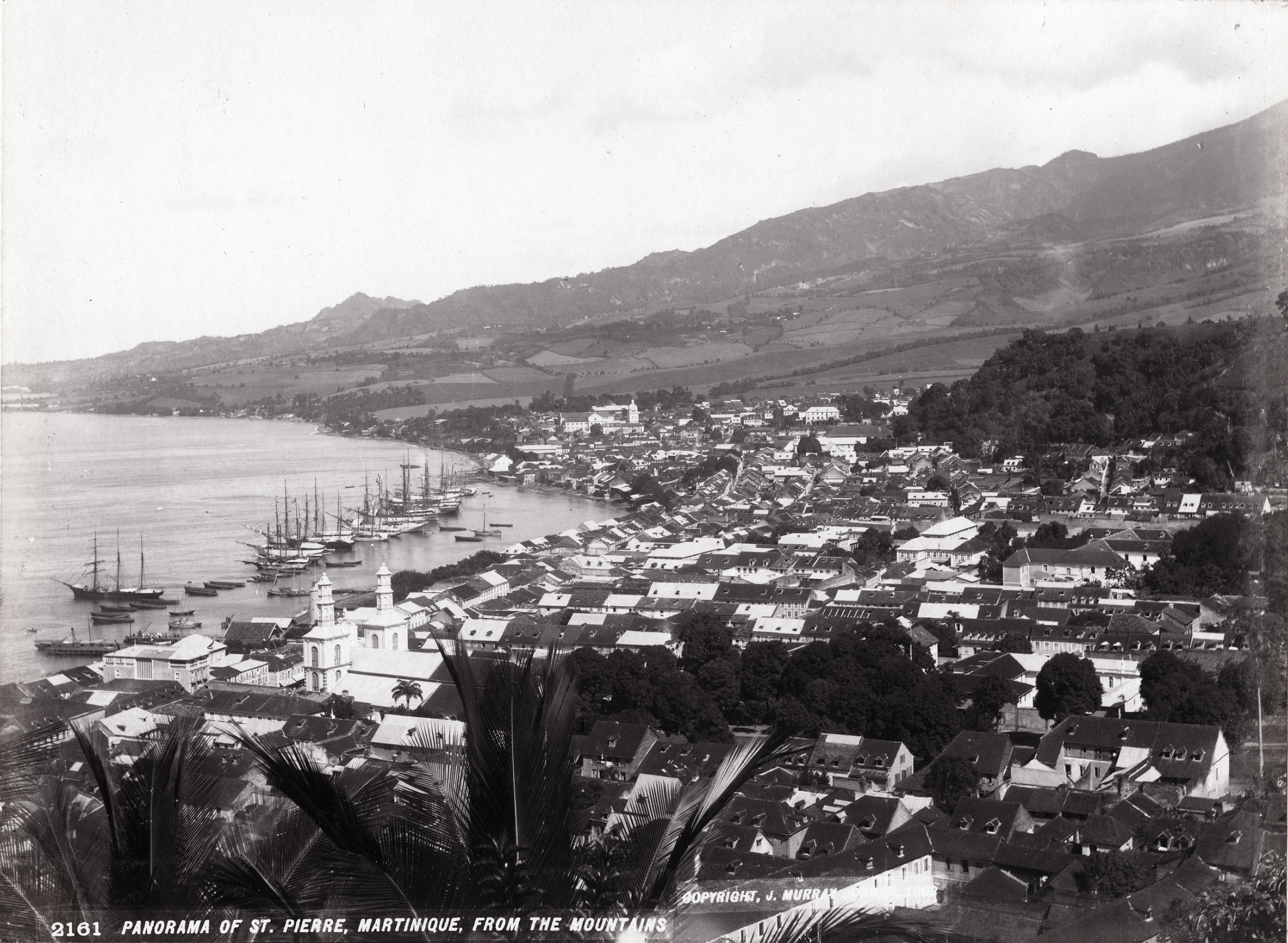
Panoramic view of Saint-Pierre from the surrounding mountains (1898)

By the late 19th century, Fort-de-France had begun to grow in administrative importance due to its improved harbour facilities and military significance, although Saint-Pierre remained the island’s largest commercial centre.

=== Eruption of Mount Pelée ===
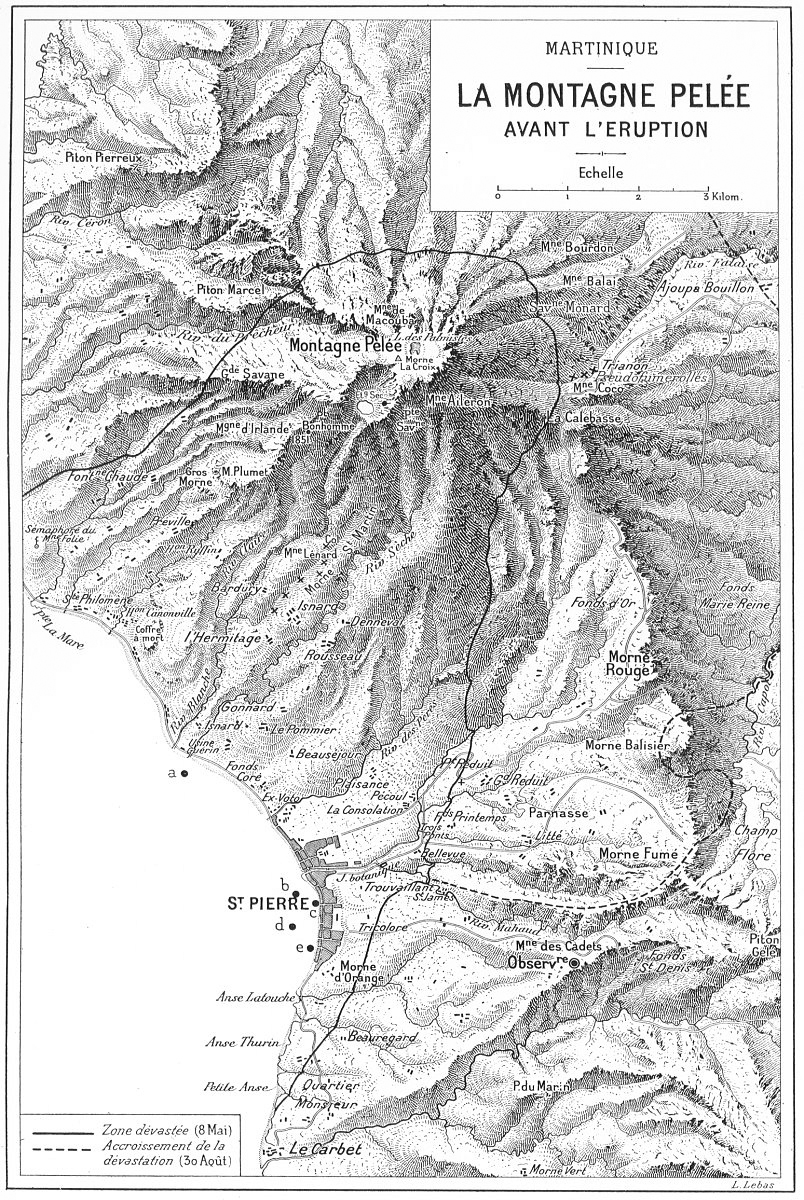
Relief map of pyroclastic flows from the Mount Pelée eruption

In 1902, Saint-Pierre was destroyed when the nearby volcano Mount Pelée erupted, killing approximately 28,000 people. The eruption generated a fast-moving pyroclastic flow that swept through the city, resulting in the near-total loss of life among its inhabitants, including refugees from surrounding settlements who had taken shelter there.

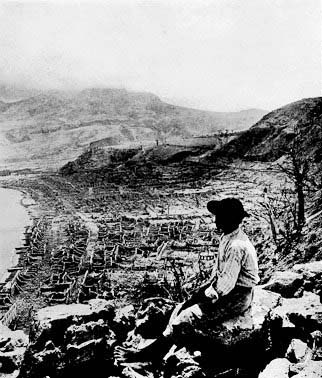
The ruins of Saint-Pierre after the 1902 eruption

In the weeks preceding the eruption, Mount Pelée showed increasing volcanic activity, including ash emissions and seismic disturbances. At the time, the phenomenon of pyroclastic flows (French: nuée ardente) was not yet understood, and hazard perception focused mainly on lava flows, which were believed unlikely to reach the city due to surrounding topography.

Contemporary and later accounts identify a small number of survivors within the city, including prisoner Louis-Auguste Cyparis and shoemaker Léon Compère-Léandre. Additional reports of isolated survivors exist, but vary between sources and are less consistently documented.

=== Aftermath and decline ===
Following the eruption, Saint-Pierre was not rebuilt as a major commercial or administrative centre, and the island’s capital was transferred to Fort-de-France, which had not been destroyed.

The town was later partially reoccupied, but it never regained its former population or regional importance.

Today, Saint-Pierre is a small town and tourist destination known for its preserved ruins and its role in volcanic heritage tourism associated with Mount Pelée.

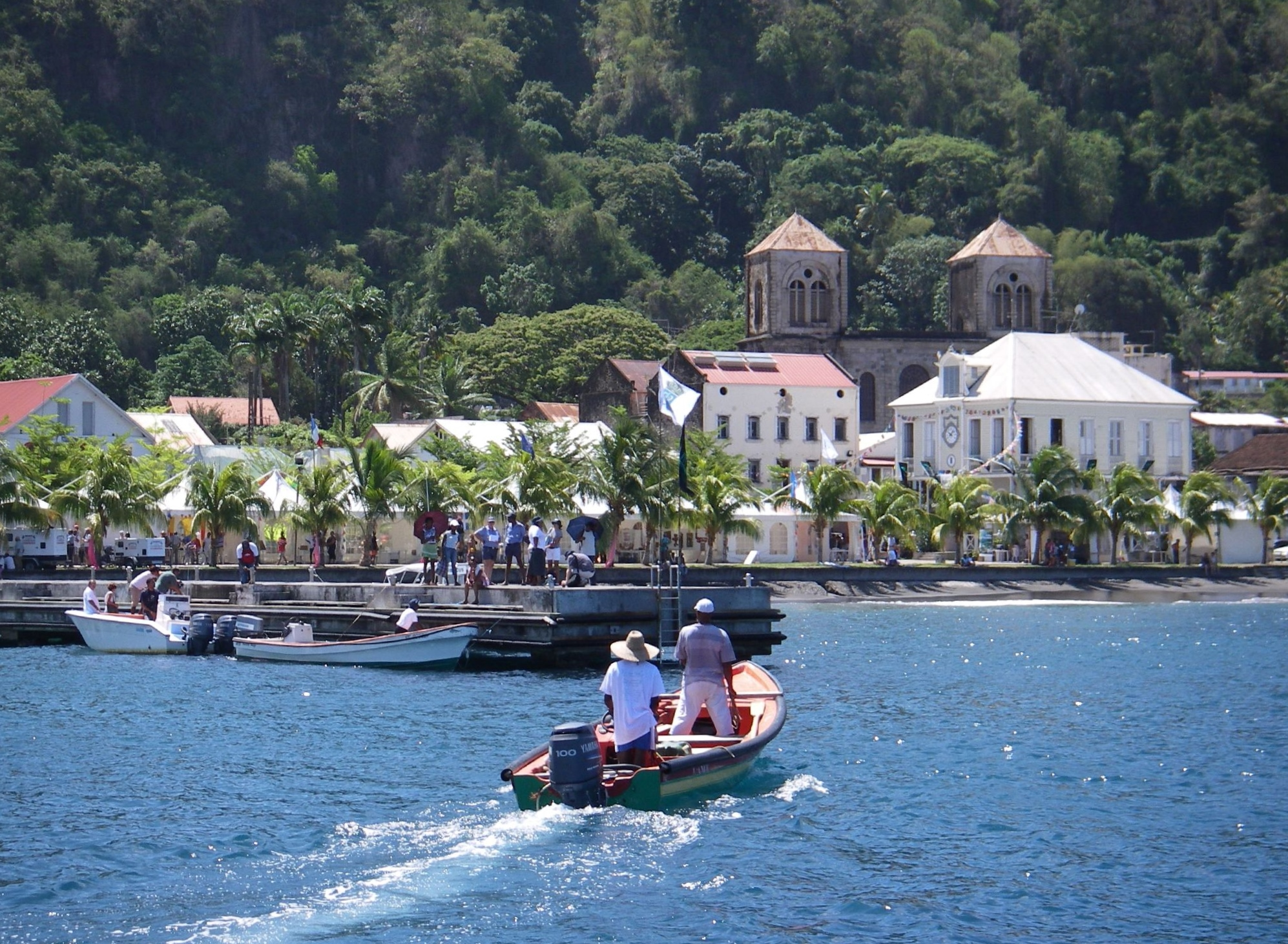
Saint-Pierre seen from the harbour in 2005

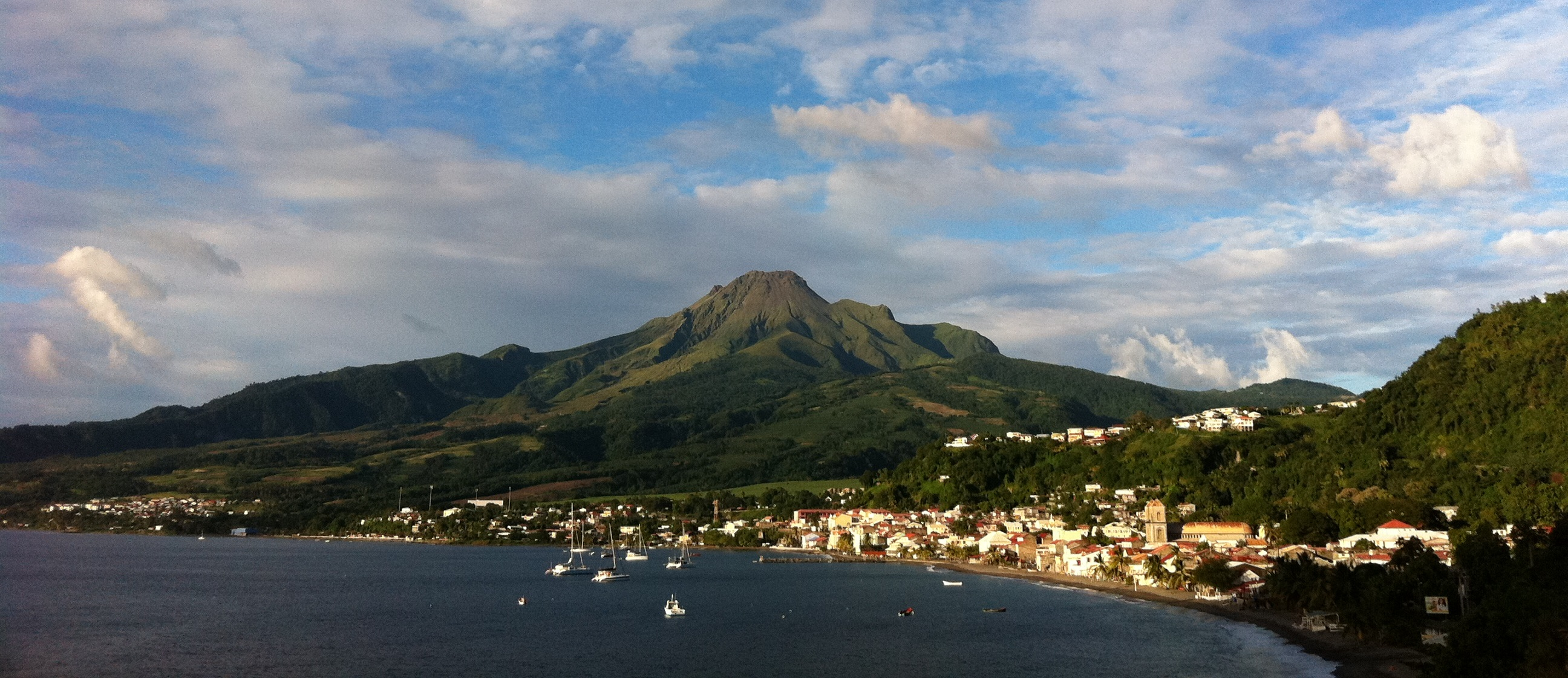
Saint-Pierre in 2015

== Climate ==
=== Temperature record ===
On 6 October 2010, Saint-Pierre recorded a temperature of 36.5 °C (97.7 °F), which is the highest temperature to have ever been recorded in Martinique.

=== Climate data of Saint-Pierre ===
Saint-Pierre has a tropical monsoon climate (Köppen climate classification Am). The average annual temperature in Saint-Pierre is 27.3 °C (81.1 °F). The average annual rainfall is 1,864.6 mm (73.41 in) with August as the wettest month. The temperatures are highest on average in August, at around 28.3 °C (82.9 °F), and lowest in January, at around 25.7 °C (78.3 °F). The highest temperature ever recorded in Saint-Pierre was 36.5 °C (97.7 °F) on 6 October 2010; the coldest temperature ever recorded was 18.5 °C (65.3 °F) on 3 February 2005.

Climate data for Saint-Pierre (1991–2020 averages, extremes 2004−present)
Month	Jan	Feb	Mar	Apr	May	Jun	Jul	Aug	Sep	Oct	Nov	Dec	Year
Record high °C (°F)	31.9 (89.4)	32.9 (91.2)	34.1 (93.4)	34.8 (94.6)	35.2 (95.4)	34.4 (93.9)	34.5 (94.1)	34.4 (93.9)	35.0 (95.0)	36.5 (97.7)	34.4 (93.9)	33.0 (91.4)	36.5 (97.7)
Mean daily maximum °C (°F)	29.3 (84.7)	29.6 (85.3)	30.4 (86.7)	31.2 (88.2)	31.8 (89.2)	31.7 (89.1)	31.7 (89.1)	31.9 (89.4)	32.2 (90.0)	31.9 (89.4)	30.9 (87.6)	29.9 (85.8)	31.0 (87.8)
Daily mean °C (°F)	25.7 (78.3)	25.8 (78.4)	26.4 (79.5)	27.2 (81.0)	28.0 (82.4)	28.3 (82.9)	28.2 (82.8)	28.3 (82.9)	28.2 (82.8)	28.1 (82.6)	27.3 (81.1)	26.3 (79.3)	27.3 (81.1)
Mean daily minimum °C (°F)	22.2 (72.0)	22.0 (71.6)	22.5 (72.5)	23.3 (73.9)	24.3 (75.7)	24.8 (76.6)	24.7 (76.5)	24.6 (76.3)	24.3 (75.7)	24.2 (75.6)	23.7 (74.7)	22.8 (73.0)	23.6 (74.5)
Record low °C (°F)	18.9 (66.0)	18.5 (65.3)	18.8 (65.8)	20.3 (68.5)	21.5 (70.7)	22.0 (71.6)	21.8 (71.2)	20.5 (68.9)	22.0 (71.6)	21.3 (70.3)	20.8 (69.4)	19.2 (66.6)	18.5 (65.3)
Average precipitation mm (inches)	125.2 (4.93)	81.6 (3.21)	59.4 (2.34)	76.9 (3.03)	118.7 (4.67)	156.7 (6.17)	231.7 (9.12)	244.0 (9.61)	203.9 (8.03)	212.7 (8.37)	182.0 (7.17)	171.8 (6.76)	1,864.6 (73.41)
Average precipitation days (≥ 1.0 mm)	17.4	15.0	11.5	11.1	11.4	16.1	20.6	19.4	15.8	16.9	15.6	18.2	188.9
Source: Météo-France

== Population ==
Historical population
Year	Pop.	±% p.a.
1967	6,559	—
1974	6,180	−0.85%
1982	5,438	−1.59%
1990	5,007	−1.03%
1999	4,453	−1.29%
2007	4,539	+0.24%
2012	4,341	−0.89%
2017	4,123	−1.03%
2023	3,961	−0.67%
Source: INSEE

== Today ==
The city of Saint-Pierre was never restored to its former entirety, though some villages were built in later decades on the site.

Today, the town is the seat of the Arrondissement of Saint-Pierre. It has been designated as a "City of Art and History". There are many historic remains, and a Volcanological Museum (Musée Frank-A.-Perret).

All that remains are ships sunk due to the volcanic eruption as the wrecks of Saint-Pierre harbor. They were discovered by Michel Météry. Today they are popular destinations for scuba diving.

== See also ==
- Co-Cathedral of Our Lady of Assumption, Saint-Pierre
- Communes of the Martinique department
- Victor Cochinat (1819–1886), French journalist
- Georges Hébert (1875–1957), French naval officer who witnessed the destruction by the volcano on the island in 1902, and went on to develop a physical training method from his experience
