= Victor Cochinat =

French lawyer and journalist (1819–1886)

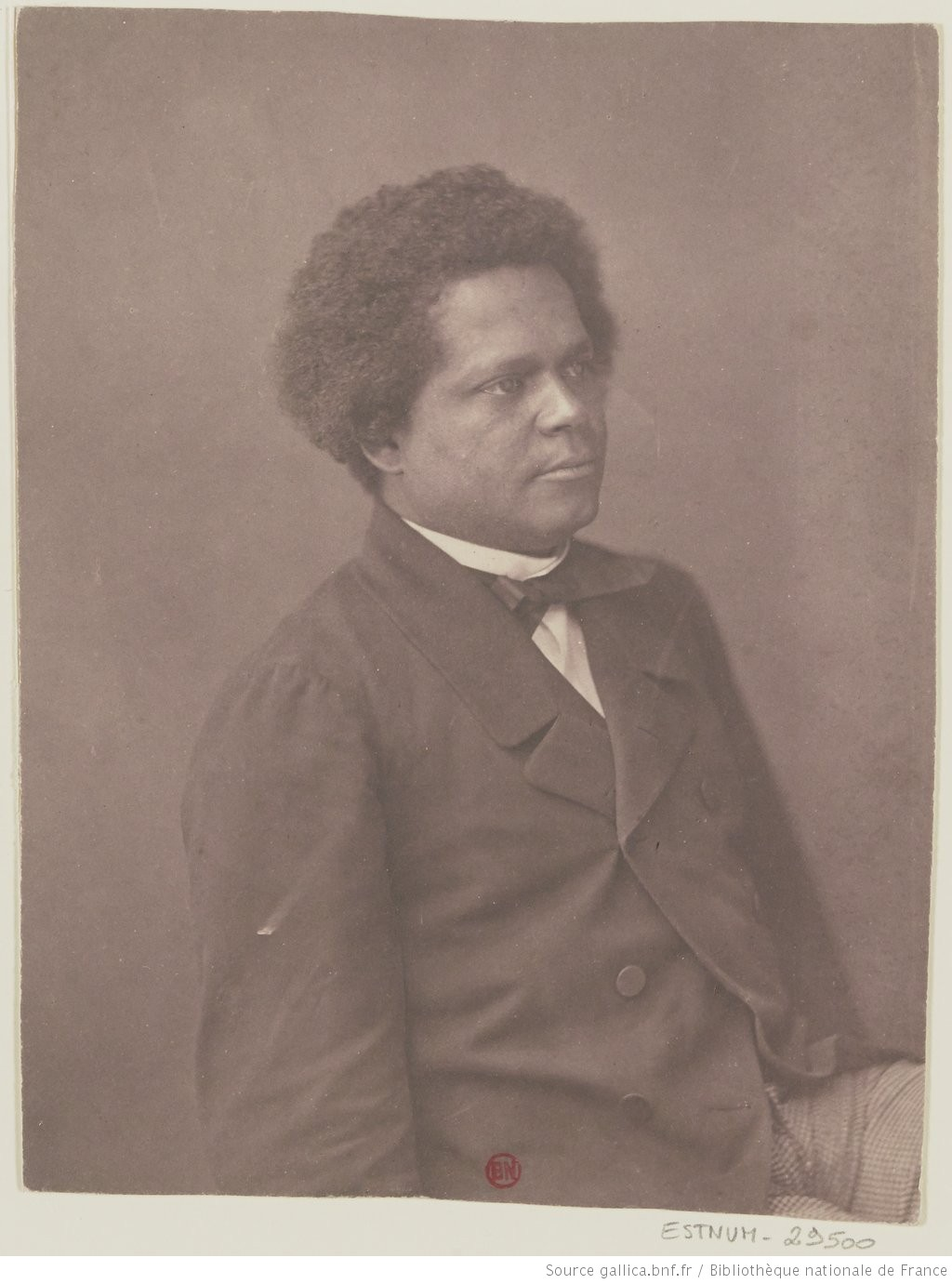
- Born: 19 January 1819; Saint-Pierre, Martinique
- Died: 6 October 1886 (aged 67); Fort-de-France
- Occupations: Lawyer; Journalist

Jean-Baptiste-Thomas-Victor Cochinat (19 January 1819 – October 1886) was a 19th-century French lawyer, journalist and man of letters. He authored political articles under the pseudonyms Maxime Leclerc, Louis de Roselay etc. He was Chief editor of the Figaro-Programme in 1856 and of Le Foyer from 23 April 1858 to 2 February 1859.

== Works ==
- 1853: La Chaîne
- 1858–1859: Le Billard
- 1859: Le guide des fumeurs
- 1859: Hygiène des fumeurs
