= Jacques Derrida bibliography =

The following is a bibliography of works by Jacques Derrida.

The precise chronology of Derrida's work is difficult to establish, as many of his books are not monographs but collections of essays that had been printed previously. Virtually all of his works were delivered in slightly different form as lectures and revised for publication. Some of his work was first collected in English, and additional content has been added to some collections with the appearance of English translations or later French editions.

== Monographs and collections ==
French			English		
L'écriture et la différence*	1967	ISBN 2-02-005182-6	Writing and Difference trans. Alan Bass	1978	ISBN 0-226-14329-5 (US); ISBN 0-415-25383-7 (UK)
De la grammatologie	1967	ISBN 2-7073-0012-8	Of Grammatology (2nd ed.) trans. Gayatri Chakravorty Spivak	1998	ISBN 0-8018-5830-5
La voix et le phénomène: introduction au problème du signe dans la phénoménologie de Husserl	1967	ISBN 2-13-053958-0	Speech and Phenomena and Other Essays on Husserl's Theory of Signs trans. David Allison	1973	ISBN 0-8101-0590-X
La dissémination	1972	ISBN 2-02-001958-2	Dissemination trans. Barbara Johnson	1981	ISBN 0-226-14334-1 (US); ISBN 0-8264-7696-1 (UK)
Marges de la philosophie*	1972	ISBN 2-7073-0053-5	Margins of Philosophy trans. Alan Bass	1982	ISBN 0-226-14326-0
"L'Archéologie du frivole" first published in 1973 as a preface to Essai sur l'origine des connaissances humaines, Étienne Bonnot de Condillac	1976	ISBN 2-7186-0371-2 (1990 edition)	Archeology of the Frivolous: Reading Condillac trans. John P. Leavey, Jr.	1980	ISBN 0-3910-1636-9
Glas	1974	ISBN 2-7186-0015-2	Glas trans. John P. Leavey, Jr. and Richard Rand	1986	ISBN 0-8032-1667-X
"Fors: les mots Anglish de Nicolas Abraham and Maria Torok," in Le Verbier de l'Homme aux loups: cryptonymie, Nicolas Abraham and Maria Torok	1976	ISBN 2-7007-0047-3	"Fors: the Anglish words of Nicolas Abraham and Maria Torok," in The Wolf Man's Magic Word: a Cryptonymy, Nicolas Abraham and Maria Torok trans. Nicholas Rand	1986	ISBN 0-8166-1422-9
Éperons: les styles de Nietzsche	1978	ISBN 2-08-211501-1	Spurs: Nietzsche's Styles		
La Vérité en peinture	1978	ISBN 2-08-081057-X	The Truth in Painting trans. Geoffrey Bennington and Ian McLeod	1987	ISBN 0-226-14324-4
La Carte postale: de Socrate à Freud et au-delà	1980	ISBN 2-08-226013-5	The Post Card: from Socrates to Freud and beyond trans. Alan Bass	1987	ISBN 0-226-14322-8
L'oreille de l'autre: Otobiographies, transferts, traductions. Textes et débats avec Jacques Derrida	1982	ISBN 2-89005-136-6	The Ear of the Other: Otobiography, Transference, Translation: Texts and Discussions with Jacques Derrida trans. Avital Ronell	1985	ISBN 0-8032-6575-1
D'un Ton apocalyptique adopté naguère en philosophie	1983	ISBN 2-7186-0243-0	Raising the tone of philosophy : late essays by Immanuel Kant, transformative critique by Jacques Derrida / edited by Peter Fenves.	1993	ISBN 0-8018-6101-2
Otobiographies. L'enseignement de Nietzsche et la politique du nom propre	1984	ISBN 2-7186-0260-0			
De l'esprit: Heidegger et la question*	1987	ISBN 2-7186-0323-2	Of Spirit: Heidegger and the Question trans. Geoffrey Bennington and Rachel Bowlby	1989	ISBN 0-226-14317-1
"Rhétorique de la drogue" in Autrement Revue (série Mutations), n° 106, avril 1989: L'esprit des drogues. La dépendance hors la loi?. dirigé par Jean Michel Hervieu, Paris, avril 1989. Republished in Hervieu, Jean-Michel. L’esprit des drogues. Paris: Autrement, 1993.	[1989] (1993)		"The Rhetoric of Drugs" trans. Michael Israel	[1991] (1993)	doi:10.1215/10407391-5-1-1
Limited Inc*, ** ed. and trans. Elisabeth Weber	1990	ISBN 0-8101-0788-0	Limited, Inc. ed. Gerald Graff, trans. Samuel Weber	1988	ISBN 0-631-17155-X
Le problème de la genèse dans la philosophie de Husserl	1990	ISBN 2-13-043011-2	The Problem of Genesis in Husserl's Phenomenology trans. Marian Hobson	2002	ISBN 0-226-14315-5
Du droit à la philosophie	1990	ISBN 0-8047-4295-2	Who's Afraid of Philosophy? trans. Jan Plug	2002	ISBN 0-8047-2385-0
"Circonfession," in Jacques Derrida* accompanying "Derridabase" by Geoffrey Bennington	1991	ISBN 2-02-012871-3	"Circumfession," in Jacques Derrida trans. Geoffrey Bennington	1993	ISBN 0-226-04262-6
Donner le temps: la fausse monnaie	1991	ISBN 2-7186-0392-5	Given Time I: Counterfeit Money trans. Peggy Kamuf	1992	ISBN 0-226-14314-7
Points de suspension: entretiens* ed. Elisabeth Weber	1992	ISBN 0-8047-2488-1	Points...*** ed. Elisabeth Weber, trans. Peggy Kamuf et al.	1995	ISBN 0-226-14314-7
Spectres de Marx : l'état de la dette, le travail du deuil et la nouvelle Internationale	1993	ISBN 2-7186-0429-8	Spectres of Marx trans. Peggy Kamuf	1994	ISBN 0-415-91045-5
Donner la mort	1993	ISBN 2-86424-129-3	The Gift of Death trans. David Wills	1995	ISBN 0-226-14306-6
Politiques de l'amitié; suivi de l'oreille de Heidegger	1994	ISBN 2-7186-0438-7	Politics of Friendship trans. George Collins	1997	ISBN 1-85984-033-7
Échographies de la télévision: entretiens filmés w/ Bernard Stiegler	1996	ISBN 2-7186-0480-8	Echographies of Television trans. Jennifer Bajorek	2002	ISBN 0-7456-2037-X
Apories: mourir—s’attendre aux "limites de la vérité"	1996	ISBN 2-7186-0461-1	Aporias: Dying—Awaiting (One Another at) the "Limits of Truth" trans. Thomas Dutoit	1993	ISBN 0-8047-2233-1
Adieu à Emmanuel Lévinas	1997	ISBN 2-7186-0485-9	Adieu to Emmanuel Levinas trans. Pascale-Anne Brault and Michael Naas	1999	ISBN 0-8047-3267-1
			Body of Prayer co-authored: David Shapiro and Michal Govrin	2001	OCLC 48462458
Chaque fois unique, la fin du monde*, *** ed. Pascale-Anne Brault	2003	ISBN 2-7186-0607-X	The Work of Mourning eds. Pascale-Anne Brault and Michael Naas	2001	ISBN 0-226-14316-3
			Acts of Religion trans. Gil Anidjar	2002	ISBN 0-415-92401-4
Voyous: deux essais sur la raison	2003	ISBN 2-7186-0606-1	Rogues: Two Essays on Reason trans. Brault and Naas	2005	ISBN 0-8047-4950-7
L'animal que, donc, je suis	2006	ISBN 2-7186-0693-2	The Animal That Therefore I Am ed. Marie-Louise Mallet, trans. David Wills	2008	ISBN 0-8232-2790-1
Séminaire La bête et le souverain : Volume I (2001-2002)	2008	ISBN 2-7186-0775-0	The Beast and the Sovereign, Volume I trans. Geoffrey Bennington	2009	ISBN 0-226-14428-3
Séminaire La bête et le souverain : Volume II (2002-2003)	2010	ISBN 2-7186-0810-2	The Beast and the Sovereign, Volume II trans. Geoffrey Bennington	2011	ISBN 0-226-14430-5
			Signature Derrida ed. Jay Williams	2013	ISBN 0-226-92452-1
Séminaire: La Peine de mort volume I (1999-2000)	2012	ISBN 2-7186-0876-5	The Death Penalty, Volume I trans. Peggy Kamuf	2013	ISBN 0-2261-4432-1
Séminaire: La Peine de mort volume II (2000-2001)	2015	ISBN 2-7186-0931-1	The Death Penalty, Volume II trans. Elizabeth Rottenberg	2017	ISBN 0-2264-1096-X

* referenced in the Derrida entry.

** the English edition collects an alternate translation of the essay "Signature, Event, Context", which already appeared in Margins of Philosophy, with "Limited Inc., abc" and "Afterword: Toward an Ethics of Discussion," which had not been previously collected in any language. The latter essays were collected first in English, partially because the last of the two was written in response to a questions put in a letter from Gerald Graff.

*** the English edition collects previous and original translations, some of which are excerpts of larger works; the French subsequent edition is expanded, containing additional essays which appeared in the interim.

== Selected translations of works by Derrida ==
- "Speech and Phenomena" and Other Essays on Husserl's Theory of Signs, trans. David B. Allison (Evanston: Northwestern University Press, 1973).
- Of Grammatology, trans. Gayatri Chakravorty Spivak (Baltimore & London: Johns Hopkins University Press, 1976) (hardcover: ISBN 0-8018-1841-9, paperback: ISBN 0-8018-1879-6, corrected edition: ISBN 0-8018-5830-5).
- Writing and Difference, trans. Alan Bass (Chicago: University of Chicago Press, 1978) ISBN 978-0-226-14329-3.
- Spurs: Nietzsche's Styles, trans. Barbara Harlow (Chicago & London: University of Chicago Press, 1979, ISBN 978-0-226-14333-0).
- The Archeology of the Frivolous: Reading Condillac, trans. John P. Leavey Jr. (Lincoln & London: University of Nebraska Press, 1980).
- Dissemination, trans. Barbara Johnson (Chicago: University of Chicago Press, 1981, ISBN 978-0-226-14334-7).
- Positions, trans. Alan Bass (Chicago: University of Chicago Press, 1981, ISBN 978-0-226-14331-6) [Paris, Minuit, 1972].
- Margins of Philosophy, trans. Alan Bass (Chicago: Chicago University Press, 1982, ISBN 978-0-226-14326-2).
- Signsponge, trans. Richard Rand (New York: Columbia University Press, 1984).
- The Ear of the Other, trans. Peggy Kamuf (Lincoln & London: University of Nebraska Press, 1985).
- Glas, trans. John P. Leavey, Jr. & Richard Rand (Lincoln & London: University of Nebraska Press, 1986).
- Memoires for Paul de Man (New York: Columbia University Press, 1986; revised edn., 1989).
- The Post Card: From Socrates to Freud and Beyond, trans. Alan Bass (Chicago & London: University of Chicago Press, 1987, ISBN 978-0-226-14322-4).
- The Truth in Painting, trans. Geoffrey Bennington & Ian McLeod (Chicago & London: Chicago University Press, 1987, ISBN 978-0-226-14324-8).
- Limited Inc (Evanston: Northwestern University Press, 1988).
- Edmund Husserl's Origin of Geometry: An Introduction, trans. John P. Leavey, Jr. (Lincoln & London: University of Nebraska Press, 1989).
- Of Spirit: Heidegger and the Question, trans. Geoffrey Bennington & Rachel Bowlby (Chicago & London: University of Chicago Press, 1989, ISBN 978-0-226-14319-4).
- Cinders (book)|Cinders, trans. Ned Lukacher (Lincoln & London: University of Nebraska Press, 1991).
- Acts of Literature (New York & London: Routledge, 1992).
- Given Time|Given Time: I. Counterfeit Money, trans. Peggy Kamuf (Chicago & London: University of Chicago Press, 1992, ISBN 978-0-226-14314-9).
- The Other Heading|The Other Heading: Reflections on Today's Europe, trans. Pascale-Anne Brault & Michael B. Naas (Bloomington & Indianapolis: Indiana University Press, 1992).
- Aporias, trans. Thomas Dutoit (Stanford: Stanford University Press, 1993).
- Jacques Derrida (book)|Jacques Derrida, co-author & trans. Geoffrey Bennington (Chicago & London: Chicago University Press, 1993, ISBN 978-0-226-04262-6).
- Memoirs of the Blind|Memoirs of the Blind: The Self-Portrait and Other Ruins, trans. Pascale-Anne Brault & Michael Naas (Chicago & London: University of Chicago Press, 1993, ISBN 978-0-226-14308-8).
- Specters of Marx: The State of the Debt, the Work of Mourning, and the New International, trans. Peggy Kamuf (New York & London: Routledge, 1994).
- Archive Fever: A Freudian Impression, trans. Eric Prenowitz (Chicago & London: University of Chicago Press, 1995, ISBN 978-0-226-14367-5).
- The Gift of Death, trans. David Wills (Chicago & London: University of Chicago Press, 1995, ISBN 978-0-226-14306-4).
- On the Name, trans. David Wood, John P. Leavey, Jr., & Ian McLeod (Stanford: Stanford University Press, 1995).
- Points...: Interviews 1974-1994, trans. Peggy Kamuf and others, (Stanford: Stanford University Press, 1995) (see also the footnote about ISBN 0-226-14314-7) (see also the [1992] French Version Points de suspension: entretiens (ISBN 0-8047-2488-1)).
- Chora L Works, with Peter Eisenman (New York: Monacelli, 1997).
- Politics of Friendship, trans. George Collins (London & New York: Verso, 1997).
- Monolingualism of the Other; or, The Prosthesis of Origin, trans. Patrick Mensah (Stanford: Stanford University Press, 1998).
- Resistances of Psychoanalysis, trans. Peggy Kamuf, Pascale-Anne Brault and Michael Naas (Stanford: Stanford University Press, 1998).
- The Secret Art of Antonin Artaud, with Paule Thévenin, trans. Mary Ann Caws (Cambridge, Mass., & London: MIT Press, 1998).
- Adieu: To Emmanuel Levinas, trans. Pascale-Anne Brault & Michael Naas (Stanford: Stanford University Press, 1999).
- Rights of Inspection, trans. David Wills (New York: Monacelli, 1999).
- Demeure: Fiction and Testimony, with Maurice Blanchot, The Instant of My Death, trans. Elizabeth Rottenberg (Stanford: Stanford University Press, 2000).
- Of Hospitality, trans. Rachel Bowlby (Stanford: Stanford University Press, 2000).
- Deconstruction Engaged: The Sydney Seminars (Sydney: Power Publications, 2001).
- On Cosmopolitanism and Forgiveness, trans. Mark Dooley & Michael Hughes (London & New York: Routledge, 2001).
- A Taste for the Secret, with Maurizio Ferraris, trans. Giacomo Donis (Cambridge: Polity, 2001).
- The Work of Mourning, trans. Pascale-Anne Brault & Michael Naas (Chicago & London: Chicago University Press, 2001, ISBN 978-0-226-14281-4).
- Acts of Religion (New York & London: Routledge, 2002).
- Echographies of Television: Filmed Interviews, with Bernard Stiegler, trans. Jennifer Bajorek (Cambridge: Polity, 2002).
- Ethics, Institutions, and the Right to Philosophy, trans Peter Pericles Trifonas (Lanham: Rowman & Littlefield, 2002).
- Negotiations: Interventions and Interviews, 1971–2001, trans. Elizabeth Rottenberg (Stanford: Stanford University Press, 2002).
- Who's Afraid of Philosophy?: Right to Philosophy 1, trans. Jan Plug (Stanford: Stanford University Press, 2002).
- Without Alibi, trans. Peggy Kamuf (Stanford: Stanford University Press, 2002).
- Philosophy in a Time of Terror|Philosophy in a Time of Terror: Dialogues with Jürgen Habermas and Jacques Derrida, with Jürgen Habermas (Chicago & London: University of Chicago Press, 2003, ISBN 978-0-226-06666-0).
- The Problem of Genesis in Husserl's Philosophy, trans. Marian Hobson (Chicago & London: Chicago University Press, 2003, ISBN 978-0-226-14315-6).
- Counterpath, with Catherine Malabou, trans. David Wills (Stanford: Stanford University Press, 2004).
- Eyes of the University: Right to Philosophy 2, trans. Jan Plug (Stanford: Stanford University Press, 2004).
- For What Tomorrow...: A Dialogue, with Elisabeth Roudinesco, trans. Jeff Fort (Stanford: Stanford University Press, 2004).
- Rogues: Two Essays on Reason, trans. Pascale-Anne Brault & Michael Naas (Stanford: Stanford University Press, 2004).
- On Touching—Jean-Luc Nancy, trans. Christine Irizarry (Stanford: Stanford University Press, 2005).
- Paper Machine, trans. Rachel Bowlby (Stanford: Stanford University Press, 2005).
- Sovereignties in Question|Sovereignties in Question: The Poetics of Paul Celan, trans. Thomas Dutoit (New York: Fordham University Press, 2005).
- H. C. for Life: That Is to Say..., trans. Laurent Milesi & Stefan Herbrechter (Stanford: Stanford University Press, 2006).
- Geneses, Genealogies, Genres, and Genius|Geneses, Genealogies, Genres, And Genius: The Secrets of the Archive, trans. Beverly Bie Brahic (New York: Columbia University Press, 2006).
- Learning to Live Finally: The Last Interview, with Jean Birnbaum, trans. Pascale-Anne Brault & Michael Naas (Melville House, 2007).
- Psyche: Inventions of the Other, Volume I (Stanford: Stanford University Press, 2007).
- Psyche: Inventions of the Other, Volume II (Stanford: Stanford University Press, 2008).
- The Animal That Therefore I Am, trans. David Wills (New York: Fordham University Press, 2008).
- The Beast and the Sovereign, Volume I, trans. Geoffrey Bennington (Chicago: University of Chicago Press, 2009, ISBN 978-0-226-14428-3).
- Copy, Archive, Signature: A Conversation on Photography, ed. Gerhard Richter, trans. Jeff Fort (Stanford: Stanford University Press, 2010).
- Athens, Still Remains: The Photographs of Jean-François Bonhomme, trans. Michael Naas (New York: Fordham University Press, 2010).
- Parages, ed. John P. Leavey, trans. Tom Conley, James Hulbert, John P. Leavey, and Avital Ronell (Stanford: Stanford University Press, 2011).
- The Beast and the Sovereign, Volume II, trans. Geoffrey Bennington (Chicago: University of Chicago Press ISBN 978-0-226-14430-6).
- Signature Derrida, ed. Jay Williams (Chicago: University of Chicago Press ISBN 978-0-226-92452-6).
- The Death Penalty, Volume I (Chicago: University of Chicago Press, 2014, ISBN 978-0-226-14432-0).
- Heidegger: The Question of Being and History (Chicago: University of Chicago Press, 2016, ISBN 978-0-226-35511-5).
- Body of Prayer, co-authored with David Shapiro and Michal Govrin (New York: The Irwin S. Chanin School of Architecture, 2001).
