= Trace (deconstruction) =

Concept in Derridian deconstruction

Trace (French: [tʁas]) is one of the most important concepts in Derridian deconstruction. In the 1960s, Jacques Derrida used this concept in two of his early books, namely Writing and Difference and Of Grammatology.

== Overview ==
In French, the word trace has a range of meanings similar to those of its English equivalent, but also suggests meanings related to the English words "track", "path", or "mark". In the preface to her translation of Of Grammatology, Gayatri Chakravorty Spivak wrote "I stick to 'trace' in my translation, because it 'looks the same' as Derrida's word; the reader must remind himself of at least the track, even the spoor, contained within the French word". Because the meaning of a sign is generated from the difference it has from other signs, especially the other half of its binary pairs, the sign itself contains a trace of what it does not mean, i.e. bringing up the concepts of woman, normality, or speech may simultaneously evoke the concepts of man, abnormality, or writing. Derrida does not positively or strictly define trace, and denies the possibility of such a project. Indeed, words like "différance", "arche-writing", "pharmakos/pharmakon", and especially "specter", carry similar meanings in many other texts by Derrida. His refusal to apply only one name to his concepts is a deliberate strategy to avoid a set of metaphysical assumptions that, he argues, have been central to the history of European thought.

Trace can be seen as an always contingent term for a "mark of the absence of a presence, an always-already absent present", of the 'originary lack' that seems to be "the condition of thought and experience". Trace is a contingent unit of the critique of language always-already present: "language bears within itself the necessity of its own critique". Deconstruction, unlike analysis or interpretation, tries to lay the inner contradictions of a text bare, and, in turn, build a different meaning from that: it is at once a process of destruction and construction. Derrida claims that these contradictions are neither accidental nor exceptions; they are the exposure of certain "metaphysics of pure presence", an exposure of the "transcendental signified" always-already hidden inside language. This "always-already hidden" contradiction is trace.

== Metaphysics and logocentrism; différance and trace ==
One of the many difficulties of expressing Jacques Derrida's project (deconstruction) in simple terms is the enormous scale of it. Just to understand the context of Derrida's theory, one needs to be acquainted intimately with philosophers such as Socrates–Plato–Aristotle, René Descartes, Immanuel Kant, Georg Wilhelm Friedrich Hegel, Charles Sanders Peirce, Jean-Jacques Rousseau, Karl Marx, Friedrich Nietzsche, Emmanuel Levinas, Edmund Husserl, Martin Heidegger and others. Some have tried to write simplified versions of this theory, such as Deconstruction for Beginners and Deconstructions: A User's Guide, but their attempts have moved away from the original. The best way to learn about deconstruction is to read Derrida's own work; nonetheless, this short exposition of the relationship between "trace" and Derrida's project may help orient his readers.

Derrida's philosophy is chiefly concerned with metaphysics, although he does not define it rigorously, and takes it to be "the science of presence". In his own words:

The history of metaphysics, like the history of the West, is the history of these metaphors and metonymies. Its matrix—if you will pardon me for demonstrating so little and for being so elliptical in order to bring me more quickly to my principal theme—is the determination of being as presence in all the senses of this word. It would be possible to show that all the names related to fundamentals, to principles, or to the center have always designated the constant of a presence—eidos, arché, telos, energia, ousia, aletheia, transcendentality, consciousness, or conscience, God, man, and so forth.

Derrida finds the root of this metaphysics, which he calls "metaphysics of pure presence", in logos, which is internal to language itself. He calls this "logocentrism", which is a tendency towards definitive truth-values through forced closure of structures. In his belief, it is the structure of language itself that forces us into metaphysics, best represented through truth-values, closures, speech as valorized by Socrates in Phaedrus. In fact, according to Derrida, Logocentrism is so all-pervasive that the mere act of opposing it cannot evade it by any margin. On the other hand, Derrida finds his Nietzschean hope (his own word is "affirmation") in heterogeneity, contradictions, absence, etc. To counter the privileged position of the speech (parole) or the phonè, he puts forward a new science of grammé or the unit of writing: grammatology.

Unlike structuralists, Derrida does not see language as the one-to-one correspondence between signified and signifier; to him, language is a play of identity and difference, an endless chain of signifiers leading to other signifiers. In spite of all the logocentric tendencies towards closure and truth-values, language, or text for that matter, always contradicts itself. This critique is inherent in all texts, not through a presence, but an absence of a presence long sought by logocentric visions. Influenced by some aspects of Freudian psycho-analysis, Derrida presents us the strategy of deconstruction, an amalgamation of Heidegger's concept of Destruktion and Levinas's concept of the Other.

Deconstruction as a strategy tries to find the most surprising contradictions in texts, unravel them, and build upon this; instead of finding the truth, the closure, or the steadfast meaning, it finds absence of presence, freeplay of meanings, etc. It is this absence of presence that is described as 'trace' by Derrida. However, he treats the word cautiously, and terms it thus only as a contingency measure, because the traditional meaning of the word 'trace' is a part of the scheme Derrida wants to uncloak.

=== Différance ===
By the virtue of trace, signifiers always simultaneously differ and defer from the illusive signified. This is something Derrida calls "différance". According to Derrida, "Différance is the non-full, non-simple "origin"; it is the structured and differing origin of differences". Further, language is labyrinthine, inter-woven and inter-related, and the threads of this labyrinth are the differences, traces. Along with "supplement", trace and différance convey a picture of what language is to Derrida. All these terms are part of his strategy; he wants to use trace to "indicate a way out of the closure imposed by the system...". Trace is, again, not presence but an empty simulation of it:

The trace is not a presence but is rather the simulacrum of a presence that dislocates, displaces, and refers beyond itself. The trace has, properly speaking, no place, for effacement belongs to the very structure of the trace. . . . In this way the metaphysical text is understood; it is still readable, and remains read.

It is essentially an "antistructuralist gesture", as he felt that the "Structures were to be undone, decomposed, desedimented". Trace, or difference, is also pivotal in jeopardizing strict dichotomies:

[I]t has been necessary to analyze, to set to work, within the text of the history of philosophy, as well as within the so-called literary text,..., certain marks, shall we say,... that by analogy (I underline) I have called undecidables, that is, unities of simulacrum, "false" verbal properties (nominal or semantic) that can no longer be included within philosophical (binary) opposition, resisting and disorganizing it, without ever constituting a third term, without ever leaving room for a solution in the form of speculative dialectics.

While the 'trace' cannot be indicated as linear or properly 'chronological' in any sense of the word, its resonance as a relay situates it as constitutive of temporality in a way prior to and conditional of historicity, as such: "It is because of différance that the movement of signification is possible only if each so-called 'present' element, each element appearing on the scene of presence, is related to something other than itself, thereby keeping within itself the mark of the past element, and already letting itself be vitiated by the mark of its relation to the future element, this trace being related no less to what is called the future than to what is called the past, and constituting what is called the present by means of this very relation to what it is not: what it absolutely is not, not even a past or a future as a modified present." Trace is a contingent strategy, a bricolage for Derrida that helps him produce a new concept of writing (as opposed to the Socratic or Saussurean speech), where "The interweaving results in each 'element'—phoneme or grapheme—being constituted on the basis of the trace within it of the other elements of the chain or system. This interweaving, this textile, is the text produced only in the transformation of another text".

== Heideggerian Dasein and Derridian trace ==
Derrida's concept of "trace" is quite similar to Martin Heidegger's concept of Dasein, although from different perspectives. Here, we see the relationship between Heideggerian existentialism and the Derridian concept of "trace", which, in turn, will also work as an indicator of a very close relationship between existentialism and deconstruction.

Derrida's first indebtedness to Heidegger lies in his use of the notion of sous rature ('under erasure'). To write 'Under erasure' is to write a word, cross it out, and then print both word and deletion. The word is inaccurate (which itself is an inaccurate word), hence the cross, yet the word is necessary, hence the printing of the word. This is one of the principal strategies of Derrida: "(possibility) of a discourse which borrows from a heritage the resources necessary for the deconstruction of that heritage itself". This is similar to the concept of bricolage coined by anthropologist Claude Lévi-Strauss. Derrida himself explains:

Lévi-Strauss will always remain faithful to this double-intention: to preserve as an instrument that whose truth-value he criticizes, conserving.....all these old concepts, while exposing....their limits, treating them as tools which can still be of use. No longer is any truth-value [or rigorous meaning] attributed to them; there is a readiness to abandon them if necessary if other instruments should appear more useful. In the meantime, their relative efficacy is exploited, and they are employed to destroy this old machinery to which they belong and of which they themselves are pieces.

However, now that we are done discussing this Derridean strategy, let us get back to the concept of sous rature. To understand it properly, we need to learn about Heidegger's existentialist theories. In doing so, we will also explore the link between existentialism and structuralism. Heidegger said that the possibility of 'being', or what he called "Dasein" (meaning being-there), is the presupposition behind any definition, any defined entity. He comes to this decision through the general problem of definition: if anything is to be defined as an entity, then the question of Being, in general, has to be answered affirmatively at first. Before we can think and decide that something exists, we must acknowledge the fact that anything can be. This Being is not an answer to a question, as it predates any thought, or possibility of thought: if the subject of your thought "exists", then the Being is always-already there. Yet, Heidegger refuses the metaphysicality of the word "Being", and tries to keep it to the human realm by crossing it out. When Heidegger puts "Being" before all concepts, he is trying to put an end to a certain trend of Western philosophy that is obsessed about the origin, and by the same token, the end. Putting "Being" under erasure is an attempt by Heidegger to save his concept of "Being" from becoming the metaphysical origin and the eschatological end of all entities. Yet, by making "Dasein" or "Being" his master-word, his function-word, Heidegger, nonetheless, fails to do so. Heidegger's concept of "Dasein" is similar to the Structuralist concept of the 'signified'. To put it simply, in Structuralism, all signifiers are directly connected to an extra-linguistic signified, the invariable ones. To 'mean' anything, a signifier must presuppose a signified already-always outside it. This is what Derrida terms as the "transcendental signified": as a signified, it belongs to the realm of language, but by being invariable, and by refusing any movement, it remains outside it [A word, if immovable, can mean nothing, or even exist. Only when an endless chain of other signifiers, other words, hints, get associated with it, it finally acquires meaning ('Camel' is understandable only when it is thinly associated with many related words, such as 'animal', 'desert', 'cigarette', 'long neck', etc.). In other words, language is this movement]. Dasein, by being under the erasure, claims to remain in the realm of physicality, but by being prior and anterior to any entity, and any thought, it remains outside them. In short, Heidegger's idea of "Dasein" fails to overcome the metaphysical trap. Derrida takes almost a similar strategy. But in his case, he puts the concept of "trace" under erasure. Trace, unlike "Dasein", is the absence of the presence, never itself the Master-word; it is the radically "other", it plays within a certain structure of difference. To Derrida, sign is the play of identity and difference; half of the sign is always "not there", and another half "not that" [We define everything negatively, a chair is 'not' a table, 'not' five-legged, one-legged, 'not' animate, 'not' of flesh. For detailed discussion, check Ferdinand de Saussure. The sign never leads to the extra-linguistic thing, it leads to another sign, one substituting the other playfully inside the structure of language. We do not feel the presence of a thing through a sign, but through the absence of other presences, we guess what it is. To Derrida, trace and not "being-there", difference and not-identity, create meaning inside language. This is the main difference between Heideggerian Dasein and Derridian trace.

== See also ==
- Context (language use)
- Connotation
- Neutral level
