= Difference (philosophy) =

Distinguishing properties of entities

Difference is a key concept of philosophy, denoting the process or set of properties by which one entity is distinguished from another within a relational field or a given conceptual system. In the Western philosophical system, difference is traditionally viewed as being opposed to identity, following the Principles of Leibniz, and in particular, his Law of the identity of indiscernibles. In structuralist and poststructuralist accounts, however, difference is understood to be constitutive of both meaning and identity. In other words, because identity (particularly, personal identity) is viewed in non-essentialist terms as a construct, and because constructs only produce meaning through the interplay of differences (see below), it is the case that for both structuralism and poststructuralism, identity cannot be said to exist without difference.

== Difference in Leibniz's law ==
Gottfried Leibniz's Principle of the identity of indiscernibles states that two things are identical if and only if they share the same and only the same properties. This is a principle which defines identity rather than difference, although it established the tradition in logic and analytical philosophy of conceiving of identity and difference as oppositional.

== Kant's critique ==
In his Critique of Pure Reason, Immanuel Kant argues that it is necessary to distinguish between the thing in itself and its appearance. Even if two objects have completely the same properties, if they are at two different places at the same time, they are numerically different:

Identity and Difference.— ... Thus, in the case of two drops of water, we may make complete abstraction of all internal difference (quality and quantity), and, the fact that they are intuited at the same time in different places, is sufficient to justify us in holding them to be numerically different. Leibnitz [sic] regarded phaenomena as things in themselves, consequently as intelligibilia, that is, objects of pure understanding ..., and in this case his principle of the indiscernible (principium identatis indiscernibilium) is not to be impugned. But, as phaenomena are objects of sensibility, and, as the understanding, in respect of them, must be employed empirically and not purely or transcendentally, plurality and numerical difference are given by space itself as the condition of external phaenomena. For one part of space, although it may be perfectly similar and equal to another part, is still without it, and for this reason alone is different from the latter .... It follows that this must hold good of all things that are in the different parts of space at the same time, however similar and equal one may be to another.

== Difference in structuralism ==
Structural linguistics, and subsequently structuralism proper, are founded on the idea that meaning can only be produced differentially in signifying systems (such as language). This concept first came to prominence in the structuralist writings of Swiss linguist Ferdinand de Saussure and was developed for the analysis of social and mental structures by French anthropologist Claude Lévi-Strauss. The former was concerned to question the prevailing view of meaning "inhering" in words, or the idea that language is a nomenclature bearing a one-to-one correspondence to the real. Instead, Saussure argues that meaning arises through differentiation of one sign from another, or even of one phoneme from another:

In language there are only differences. Even more important: a difference generally implies positive terms between which the difference is set up; but in language there are only differences without positive terms. Whether we take the signified or the signifier, language has neither ideas nor sounds that existed before the linguistic system, but only conceptual and phonic differences that have issued from the system. The idea or phonic substance that a sign contains is of less importance than the other signs that surround it. ... A linguistic system is a series of differences of sound combined with a series of differences of ideas; but the pairing of a certain number of acoustical signs with as many cuts made from the mass thought engenders a system of values.

In his Structural Anthropology, Claude Lévi-Strauss applied this concept to the anthropological study of mental structures, kinship and belief systems, examining the way in which social meaning emerges through a series of structural oppositions between paired/opposed kinship groups, for example, or between basic oppositional categories (such as friend and enemy, life and death, or in a later volume, the raw and the cooked).

== Difference and différance in poststructuralism ==
The French philosopher Jacques Derrida both extended and profoundly critiqued structuralist thought on the processes by which meaning is produced through the interplay of difference in language, and in particular, writing. Whereas structuralist linguistics had recognized that meaning is differential, much structuralist thought, such as narratology, had become too focused on identifying and producing a typology of the fixed differential structures and binary oppositions at work in any given system. In his work, Derrida sought to show how the differences on which any signifying system depends are not fixed, but get caught up and entangled with each other. Writing itself becomes the prototype of this process of entanglement, and in Of Grammatology (1967) and "Différance" (in Margins of Philosophy, 1972) Derrida shows how the concept of writing (as the paradoxical absence or de-presencing of the living voice) has been subordinated to the desired "full presence" of speech within the Western philosophical tradition. His early thought on the relationship between writing and difference is collected in his book of essays entitled Writing and Difference (1967).

Elsewhere, Derrida coined the term différance (a deliberate misspelling of différence) in order to provide a conceptual hook for his thinking on the meaning processes at work within writing/language. This neologism is a play on the two meanings of the French word différer: to differ and to defer. Derrida thereby argues that meaning does not arise out of fixed differences between static elements in a structure, but that the meanings produced in language and other signifying systems are always partial, provisional and infinitely deferred along a chain of differing/deferring signifiers. At the same time, the word différance itself performs this entanglement and confusion of differential meanings, for it depends on a minimal difference (the substitution of the letter "a" for the letter "e") which cannot be apprehended in oral speech, since the suffixes "-ance" and "-ence" have the same pronunciation in French. The "phonemic" (non-)difference between différence and différance can only be observed in writing, hence producing differential meaning only in a partial, deferred and entangled manner.

Différance has been defined as "the non-originary, constituting-disruption of presence": spatially, it differs, creating spaces, ruptures, and differences and temporally, it defers, delaying presence from ever being fully attained. Derrida's criticism of essentialist ontology draws on the differential ontology of Friedrich Nietzsche (who introduced the concept of Verschiedenheit, "difference", in his unpublished manuscripts (KSA 11:35[58], p. 537)) and Emmanuel Levinas (who proposed an ethics of the Other).

In a similar vein, Gilles Deleuze's Difference and Repetition (1968) was an attempt to think difference as having an ontological privilege over identity, inverting the traditional relationship between those two concepts and implying that identities are only produced through processes of differentiation.

== See also ==
- Nominalism#Indian philosophy
- Deconstruction
- Distinction (philosophy) – Fundamental philosophical abstraction; the recognition of difference
