= Grammatology (disambiguation) =

Grammatology may refer to:

- Grammatology, the study of writing systems
- Of Grammatology, a work by philosopher Jacques Derrida
