= The Post Card =

Book by Jacques Derrida

The Post Card: From Socrates to Freud and Beyond
- Cover of the first edition
- Author: Jacques Derrida
- Original title: La carte postale: De Socrate à Freud et au-delà
- Translator: Alan Bass
- Language: French
- Subject: Epistolary literature
- Publisher: Flammarion, University of Chicago Press
- Publication date: 1980
- Publication place: France
- English publication date: 1987
- Media type: Print (Paperback)
- Pages: 521 (University of Chicago Press edition)
- ISBN: 0-226-14322-8 (University of Chicago Press edition)

The Post Card: From Socrates to Freud and Beyond (French: La carte postale: De Socrate à Freud et au-delà) is a 1980 book by the French philosopher Jacques Derrida. It is a "satire of epistolary literature." After Glas (1974), it is sometimes considered Derrida's most "literary" book, and continues the critical engagement with psychoanalysis first signaled in "Freud and the Scene of Writing" from Derrida's Writing and Difference (1967).

== Summary ==
The first half of the book, titled Envois (sendings), contains a series of love letters addressed by a travelling "salesman" to an unnamed loved one. The latter remembers, for example, "the day we bought that bed (the complications with the credit and the punch card in the store, and then one of those awful scenes between us)". He writes his love letters on the back of countless copies of a postcard and continually fantasizes about the relationship between Socrates and Plato. Added to this couple are also those between Sigmund Freud and Martin Heidegger, Derrida's two grandparents, but also between Heidegger and Being, "beings" and Being, the Subject and the Object, the author himself and "you", his "tender love". In one of the letters, dated 6 June 1977, Derrida tells about his time spent in London with Jonathan Culler and Cynthia Chase, who had recently married. They showed Derrida an exposition of hundreds of card reproductions, among which was Matthew Paris' medieval depiction of Socrates (held by Oxford Bodleian Library) taking dictation from Plato, which seized Derrida's attention by its reversal of the historical relationship between the two figures (since Socrates himself left behind no written texts). After describing Plato's posture in the picture, and speculating about what he may have been doing behind Socrates's back (riding a skateboard, conducting a tram), Derrida says:

...The card immediately seemed to me, how to put it, obscene. [...] For the moment, myself, I tell you that I see Plato getting an erection in Socrates' back and see the insane hubris of his prick, an interminable, disproportionate erection ... slowly sliding, still warm, under Socrates' right leg [...] Imagine the day, when we will be able to send sperm by post card. [... and finally, Plato] wants to emit ... to sow the entire earth, to send the same fertile card to everyone.

Usually Socrates has been represented as an ugly and humble commoner who managed to seduce the noble and beautiful Plato, "converting" him to philosophy. In this medieval image, however, the roles are reversed: Plato is ugly, badly dressed and referred to as "plato" with a small initial, while Socrates is handsome and richly dressed. Taking a cue from this image, Derrida provides, through a sort of Freudian association of ideas, all the possible ways in which philosophers have been influenced, without worrying about the "truth" of his interpretations. If there was "a single reading of the Oxford postcard, the one and only reading, it would be the end of the story. It would be the becoming prose of our love".

Envois is followed by:

- To Speculate - On Freud, an extended commentary on Beyond the Pleasure Principle
- Le Facteur de la Verité (the factor/postman of truth), a critique of Lacanian psychoanalysis focusing on an analysis of Lacan's Edgar Allan Poe commentary, the "Seminar on 'The Purloined Letter'"
- and Du Tout (on the whole), a response to questions posed by the psychoanalyst René Major concerning Glas and Derrida's general relation to psychoanalytic theory.

In 2014 a feature film based on the book was released. Love in the Post is directed by Joanna Callaghan and co-written by Martin McQuillan and produced by Heraclitus Pictures. The film features an unseen interview with Derrida and contributions from Geoffrey Bennington, J. Hillis Miller, Sam Weber, Ellen Burt and Catherine Malabou.
