= Structure, Sign, and Play in the Discourse of the Human Sciences =

1966 lecture by Jacques Derrida

"Structure, Sign, and Play in the Discourse of the Human Sciences" (French: La structure, le signe et le jeu dans le discours des sciences humaines) was a lecture presented at Johns Hopkins University on 21 October 1966 by philosopher Jacques Derrida. The lecture was then published in 1967 as chapter ten of Writing and Difference (French: L'écriture et la différence).

"Structure, Sign, and Play" identifies a tendency for philosophers to denounce each other for relying on problematic discourse, and argues that this reliance is to some degree inevitable because we can only write in the language we inherit. Discussing the anthropology of Claude Lévi-Strauss, Derrida argues that we are all bricoleurs, creative thinkers who must use the tools we find around us.

Although presented at a conference intended to popularize structuralism, the lecture is widely cited as the starting point for post-structuralism in the United States. Along with Derrida's longer text Of Grammatology, it is also programmatic for the process of deconstruction.

== Colloquium ==
Derrida wrote "Structure, Sign, and Play" to present at a conference titled "The Language of Criticism and the Sciences of Man" held at Johns Hopkins University in Baltimore from 18–21 October 1966. The conference, organized by René Girard and Richard A. Macksey for the newly founded Humanities Center, and sponsored by the Ford Foundation, brought together a collection of notable French thinkers, including Paul de Man, Roland Barthes, Jean Hyppolite and Jacques Lacan. (Michel Foucault was, in the words of Jean-Michel Rabaté, "notoriously absent".) Derrida reportedly wrote his essay rather quickly in the ten or fifteen days preceding the conference. (According to one report, Derrida was a last-minute replacement for anthropologist Luc de Heusch.)

Many attendees came from France, and spoke French during the event; French lectures were translated into English and distributed in print. Derrida's lecture was listed in the program and delivered in French, as "La structure, le signe et le jeu dans le discours des sciences humaines". (Lacan was one of the few French attendees to lecture in English; Lacan makes a point of this gesture at the beginning of the lecture, titled "Of Structure as the Inmixing of an Otherness Prerequisite to Any Subject Whatever".)

"Structure, Sign, and Play" was first published in English in 1970, within a volume dedicated to the Johns Hopkins colloquium titled The Structuralist Controversy: The Languages of Criticism and the Sciences of Man. Macksey and Donato write in the preface to this volume that the goal of the conference was to clarify the field of structuralism and define some of its common problems across disciplines.

== Content ==
"Structure, sign, and play" discusses how philosophy and social science understand 'structures' abstractly. Derrida is dealing with structuralism, a type of analysis which understands individual elements of language and culture as embedded in larger structures. The archetypal examples of structuralism come from Ferdinand de Saussure, who argued that phonemes gain 'linguistic value' through their relations with each other. (Derrida dealt directly with Saussure in a related book titled Of Grammatology). The main object of this text is Claude Lévi-Strauss, whose structuralist anthropology analyzed the relationships between elements of cultural systems such as mythology.

Derrida admires the reflexivity and abstract analyses of structuralism, but argues that these discourses have still not gone far enough in treating structures as free-floating (or 'playing') sets of relationships. In particular, he accuses structuralist discourses of holding on to a "center": a privileged term that anchors the structure and does not play. Whether this center is "God", "being", "presence", or "man" (as it was at the colloquium), its function is the same, and the history of structures is a history of substitutions, one center after another, for this constant position. Derrida suggests that this model of structure will end—is ending—and that a newer and freer (though still unknown) thinking about structures will emerge.

=== An 'event' has perhaps occurred ===
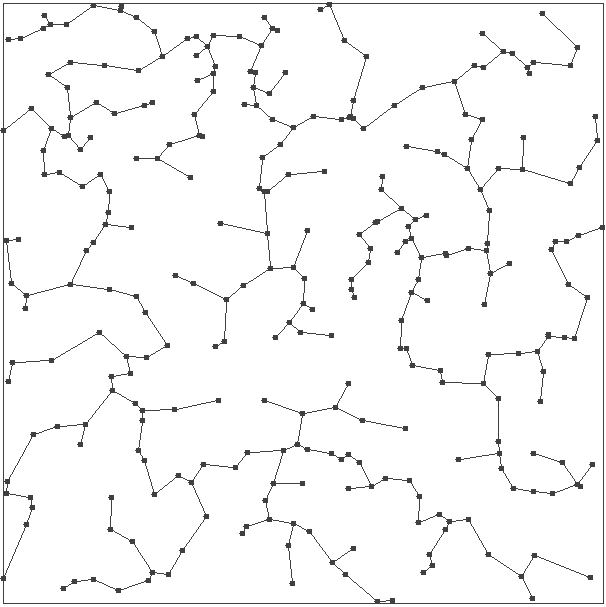
Where's the center?

The essay begins by speculating, "Perhaps something has occurred in the history of the concept of structure that could be called an 'event,' if this loaded word did not entail a meaning which it is precisely the function of structural—structuralist—thought to reduce or suspect." The 'event' involves changes in structuralism, structure, and in particular "the structurality of structure", which has hitherto been limited, writes Derrida, through the process of being assigned a stabilizing "center". The "center" is that element of a structure which appears given or fixed, thereby anchoring the rest of the structure and allowing it to play. In the history of metaphysics specifically, this function is fulfilled by different terms (which Derrida says are always associated with presence): "eidos, archè, telos, energia, ousia (essence, existence, substance, subject) aletheia, transcendentality, consciousness, or conscience, God, man, and so forth." Whichever term is at the center of the structure, argues Derrida, the overall pattern remains similar. This central term ironically escapes structurality, the key feature of structuralism according to which all meaning is defined relationally, through other terms in the structure. From this perspective, the center is the most alien or estranged element in a structure: it comes from somewhere outside and remains absolute until a new center is substituted in a seemingly arbitrary fashion. "The center", therefore, "is not the center."

The 'event' under discussion is the opening of the structure, which became inevitable "when the structurality of structure had to begin to be thought" and the contradictory role of the center exposed. The result of the event, according to Derrida, must be the full version of structural "freeplay", a mode in which all terms are truly subject to the openness and mutability promised by structuralism. Derrida locates the beginning of this process in the writings of earlier philosophers, who continued to use the pattern of metaphysics even as they denounced it in others.

=== Reciprocal destroyers ===
Derrida depicts Nietzsche, Freud, and Heidegger, three of his greatest influences, as ultimately trapped within a destructive spiral of denunciation. Nietzsche questioned the power of representation and concepts to really convey truth; Freud challenged the idea that mind was limited to consciousness; and Heidegger criticized the idea of "being as presence". Derrida argues that these theoretical moves share a common form:

But all these destructive discourses and all their analogues are trapped in a sort of circle. This circle is unique. It describes the form of the relationship between the history of metaphysics and the destruction of the history of metaphysics. [...] there are many ways of being caught in this circle. They are all more or less naïve, more or less empirical, more or less systematic, more or less close to the formulation or even to the formalization of this circle. It is these differences which explain the multiplicity of destructive discourses and the disagreement between those who make them. It was within concepts inherited from metaphysics that Nietzsche, Freud, and Heidegger worked, for example. Since these concepts are not elements or atoms and since they are taken from a syntax and a system, every particular borrowing drags along with it the whole of metaphysics. This is what allows these destroyers to destroy each other reciprocally—for example, Heidegger, considering Nietzsche, with as much lucidity and rigor as bad faith and misconstruction, as the last metaphysician, the last "Platonist." One could do the same for Heidegger himself, for Freud, or for a number of others. And today no exercise is more widespread.

Derrida does not assert the possibility of thinking outside such terms; any attempt to undo a particular concept is likely to become caught up in the terms which the concept depends on. For instance: if we try to undo the centering concept of ‘consciousness’ by asserting the disruptive counterforce of the ‘unconscious’, we are in danger of introducing a new center. All we can do is refuse to allow either pole in a system to become the center and guarantor of presence.

=== Lévi-Strauss ===
Culinary Triangle, a prototypical diagram of Lévi-Straussian structuralist anthropology

Having described a pattern—denouncing metaphysics while relying on it—in discourses about metaphysics, Derrida suggests consideration of the same pattern within the "human sciences", whose subjection to the "critique of ethnocentrism" parallels the "destruction of the history of metaphysics" in philosophy. Derrida argues that, just as philosophers use metaphysical terms and concepts to critique metaphysics (and criticize the use of these concepts by others), the ethnologist "accepts into his discourse the premises of ethnocentrism at the very moment when he is employed in denouncing them". He examines the work of Claude Lévi-Strauss, particularly as it concerns "the opposition between nature and culture", as his case study and primary focus for the essay.

=== Bricolage ===
Derrida highlights Lévi-Strauss's use of the term bricolage, the activity of a bricoleur. "The bricoleur, says Lévi-Strauss, is someone who uses 'the means at hand,' that is, the instruments he finds at his disposition around him, those which are already there, which had not been especially conceived with an eye to the operation for which they are to be used and to which one tries by trial and error to adapt them, not hesitating to change them whenever it appears necessary." Bricolage becomes a metaphor for philosophical and literary critiques, exemplifying Derrida's previous argument about the necessity of using the language available. The bricoleur's foil is the engineer, who creates out of whole cloth without the need for bricolage—however, the engineer is merely a myth since all physical and intellectual production is really bricolage.

=== Structure and myth ===
Derrida praises Lévi-Strauss for his insights into the complexities, limitations, and circularities of examining 'a culture' from the outside in order to classify its mythological system. In particular he praises Lévi-Strauss's recognition that a mythological system cannot be studied as though it was some finite portion of physical reality to be scientifically divided and conquered. Derrida quotes Lévi-Strauss's The Raw and the Cooked:

In effect the study of myths poses a mythological problem by the fact that it cannot conform to the Cartesian principle of dividing the difficulty into as many parts as are necessary to resolve it. There exists no veritable end or term to mythical analysis, no secret unity which could be grasped at the end of the work in decomposition. The themes duplicate themselves to infinity. When we think we have disentangled them from each other and can hold them separate, it is only to realize that they are joining together again, in response to the attraction of unforeseen affinities.

In Derrida's words, "structural discourse on myths—mythological discourse—must itself be mythomorphic". Lévi-Strauss explicitly describes a limit to totalization (and at the same time the endlessness of 'supplementarity'). Thus Lévi-Strauss, for Derrida, recognizes the structurality of mythical structure and gestures towards its freeplay.

But Derrida criticizes Lévi-Strauss for an inability to explain historical changes—for describing structural transformation as the consequence of mysterious outside forces (paralleling the substitute "centers" that make up the history of metaphysics).

Ultimately, Derrida perceives in Lévi-Strauss "a sort of ethic of presence, an ethic of nostalgia for origins, an ethic of archaic and natural innocence, of a purity of presence and self-presence in speech", arguing that "this structuralist thematic of broken immediateness is thus the sad, negative, nostalgic, guilty, Rousseauist facet of the thinking of freeplay of which the Nietzschean affirmation—the joyous affirmation of the freeplay of the world and without truth, without origin, offered to an active interpretation—would be the other side." True freeplay, argues Derrida, actually undoes this certainty about presence:

Freeplay is the disruption of presence. The presence of an element is always a signifying and substitutive reference inscribed in a system of differences and the movement of a chain. Freeplay is always an interplay of absence and presence, but if it is to be radically conceived, freeplay must be conceived before the alternative of presence and absence; being must be conceived of as presence or absence beginning with the possibility of freeplay and not the other way around.

Derrida concludes by reaffirming the existence of a transformation within structuralism, suggesting that it espouses this affirmative view of unlimited freeplay and presenting it as unpredictable yet inevitable.

== Influence ==
The 1966 colloquium, although intended to organize and strengthen the still-murky field of structuralism became known through Derrida's lecture as a turning point and the beginning of the post-structuralist movement. Derrida acknowledged the influence of the Hopkins colloquium, writing in 1989:

It is more and more often said that the Johns Hopkins colloquium ("The Languages of Criticism and the Sciences of Man") was in 1966, more than twenty years ago, an event in which many things changed (it is on purpose that I leave these formulations somewhat vague) on the American scene—which is always more than the American scene. What is now called "theory" in this country may even have an essential link with what is said to have happened there in 1966.

Scholars attempting to explain the success of Derrida's presentation have argued that it fit well with the current of radicalism developing in the United States.

The essay sowed the seeds of popularity for French post-structuralism at eastern universities in the United States, particularly Johns Hopkins, Cornell, and Yale. Derrida also returned several times to the Hopkins Humanities Center, the faculty of which still credits his influence. The colloquium also created a demand for the French intellectuals on American campuses, which led notably to Derrida's 1986 recruitment by University of California, Irvine.

== Criticism ==
The colloquium came under scrutiny from the new journal Telos when, in 1970, Richard Moss published an article criticizing its sponsors and denouncing it as an agent of multinational capitalism. Derrida, in particular, drew criticism from Marxists such as Fredric Jameson who criticized deconstruction's emphasis on textuality abstracted from class struggle.

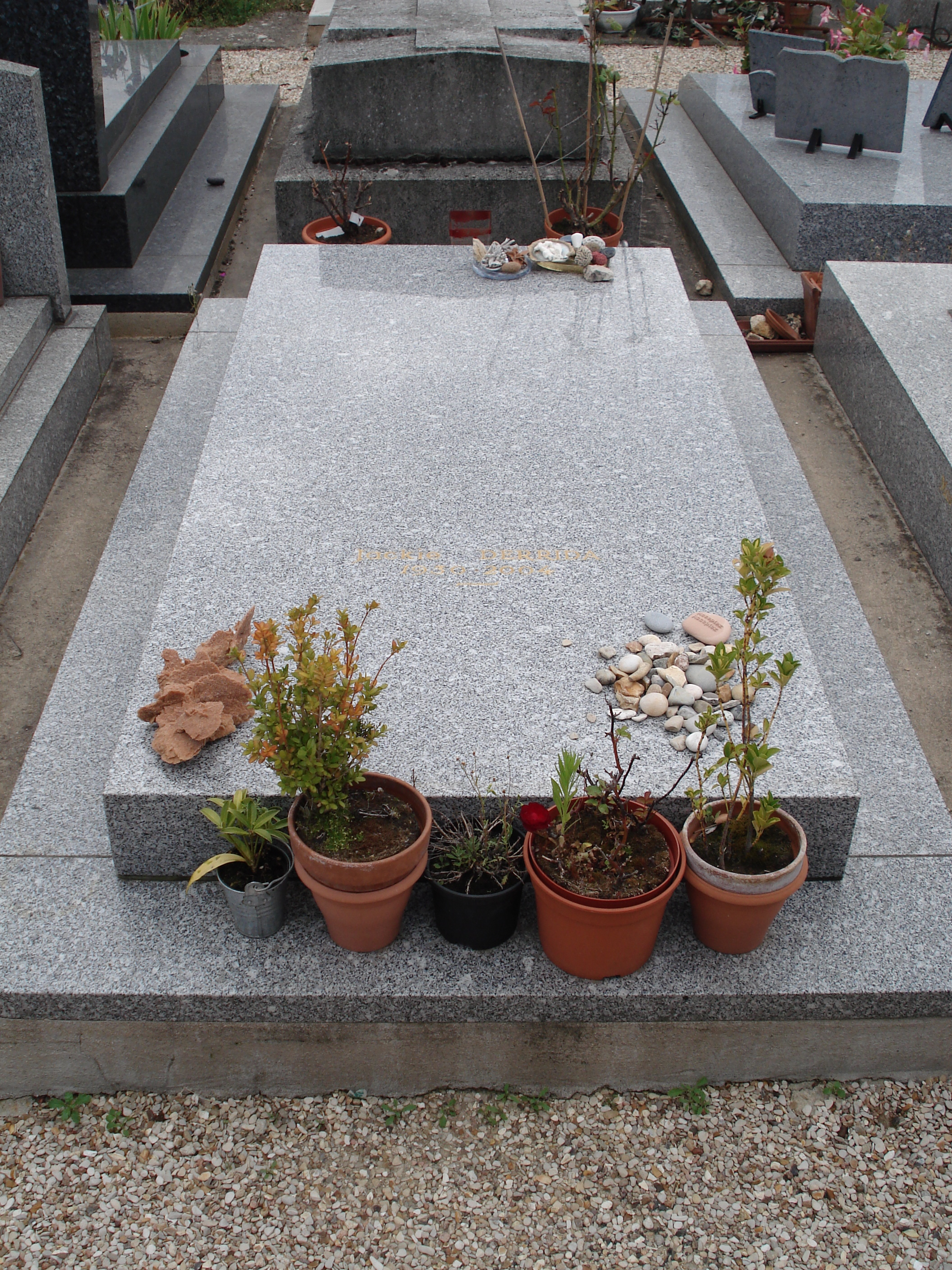
Derrida's grave

The New York Times argued in its obituary for Derrida that "Structure, Sign, and Play" offered professors of literature a philosophical movement they could legitimately consider their own.

== See also ==
- Différance
- Postmodernism
- Nietzschean affirmation#Derridean interpretation

== Bibliography ==
- Cusset, François. French Theory: How Foucault, Derrida, Deleuze, & Co. transformed the intellectual life of the United States. Translated by Jeff Fort with Josephine Berganza and Marlon Jones. Minneapolis: University of Minnesota Press (with assistance from the French Ministry of Culture), 2008. ISBN 9780816647323. Originally published as French Theory: Foucault, Derrida, Deleuze & Cie et les mutations de Ia vie intellectuelle aux États-Unis. Éditions LaDécouverte, 2003. ISBN 2707137448.
- Derrida, Jacques. Writing and Difference. Chicago: University of Chicago Press, 1980. Translated by Alan Bass. ISBN 9780226143293. Originally published in 1967 as L'écriture et la différence. Paris: Éditions du Seuil, 1967. ISBN 2-02-001937-X.
- Lévi-Strauss, Claude. The Raw and the Cooked. Translated by John and Doreen Weightman. Chicago: University of Chicago, 1969. ISBN 9780226474878. Originally: Le Cru et le cuit (1964).
- Macksey, Richard, and Eugenio Donato. The Structuralist Controversy: The Languages of Criticism and the Sciences of Man. Baltimore: Johns Hopkins Press, 2007. 40th anniversary edition. ISBN 9780801883958. Originally published as The Languages of Criticism and the Sciences of Man. Baltimore: Johns Hopkins Press, 1970.
- Norris, Christopher. Contest of Faculties: Philosophy and Theory After Deconstruction. Re-published as an e-book by Routledge in 2010. ISBN 9780415572378. Originally published: London: Methuen & Co. Ltd., 1895. ISBN 9780416399400.
- Powell, Jason. Jacques Derrida : A Biography. London: Continuum International, May 2006. ISBN 9780826490018.
