= Positions (book) =

1972 book by Jacques Derrida

- Cover of the first edition
- Author: Jacques Derrida
- Language: French
- Subject: Philosophy
- Published: 1972
- Publication place: France
- Media type: Print

Positions is a 1972 book by the French philosopher Jacques Derrida.

== Summary ==
Positions consists of a collection of interviews. Derrida talks about his earlier works and their relationships. He said that his 1962 essay, Edmund Husserl's Origin of Geometry: An Introduction, already contained many elements of his thought, that would be further elaborated. He added: "that essay can be read as the other side (recto or verso, as you wish) of Speech and Phenomena."

On the relationship between his three foundational works of 1967, Derrida explained: " Speech and Phenomena is perhaps the essay which I like most. Doubtless I could have bound it as a long note to one or the other of the other two works. Of Grammatology refers to it and economizes its development. But in a classical philosophical architecture, Speech... would come first: in it is posed, at a point which appears juridically decisive for reasons that I cannot explain here, the question of the privilege of the voice and of phonetic writing in their relationship to the entire history of the West, such as this history can be represented by the history of metaphysics and metaphysics in its most modern, critical and vigilant form: Husserl's transcendental phenomenology."

== Contents ==
1. «Implications. Entretien avec Henri Ronse», pp. 9–24; 9–23 [cf. b 1967(d)]
2. «Sémiologie et grammatologie. Entretien avec Julia Kristeva», pp. 25–50; 25–46 [cf. b 1968(d)]
3. «Positions. Entretien avec Jean-Louis Houdebine et Guy Scarpetta», pp. 51–133; 47–117 [cf. b 1971(a)]
4. «Aver l'orecchio per la filosofia. Colloquio con Lucette Finas», pp. 119–135 (nella sola ed. it.) [cf. b 1972(b)]

== Editions ==
- [French original] 1972 Positions, Les Éditions de Minuit, Paris
- [English] 1981 Positions, trans. Alan Bass (Chicago & London: University of Chicago Press)
