= Glas (book) =

1974 book by Jacques Derrida

- Cover of the first edition
- Author: Jacques Derrida
- Original title: Glas
- Translator: John P. Leavey, Jr. & Richard Rand
- Language: French
- Subjects: Georg Wilhelm Friedrich Hegel; Jean Genet
- Publisher: 1974 – Galilee (original French); 1986 – University of Nebraska Press (English translation)
- Publication place: France
- Media type: Print

Glas (also translated as Clang) is a 1974 book by the French philosopher Jacques Derrida. It combines a reading of Georg Wilhelm Friedrich Hegel's philosophical works and of Jean Genet's autobiographical writing. "One of Derrida's more inscrutable books," its form and content invite a reflection on the nature of literary genre and of writing.

== Structure and content ==
=== Columns ===

Following the structure of Jean Genet's Ce qui est resté d'un Rembrandt déchiré en petits carrés bien réguliers, et foutu aux chiottes ["What Remains of a Rembrandt Torn into Four Equal Pieces and Flushed Down the Toilet"], the book is written in two columns in different type sizes. The left column is about Hegel, the right column is about Genet. Each column weaves its way around quotations of all kinds, both from the works discussed and from dictionaries—Derrida's "side notes", described as "marginalia, supplementary comments, lengthy quotations, and dictionary definitions." Sometimes words are cut in half by a quotation which may last several pages. A Dutch commentator, recalling Derrida's observation that he wrote with two hands, the one commenting on the other, noted that the two-column format aims to open a space for what the individual texts excluded, in an auto-deconstructive mode.

Allan Megill described the text as a "literary-philosophical collage." Typography is an important part of the text's presentation and argument; the English translation was designed by Richard Eckersley, noted for his renderings of deconstructionist texts. Gregor Dotzauer, writing for Der Tagesspiegel, argues that the two columns are explicitly phallic symbols, opposing each other in a power struggle that neither can win. Literary theorist Susan Handelman has described the book's structure as being reminiscent of the format of the Talmud.

Gayatri Chakravorty Spivak, in a 1977 article published in Diacritics, interprets the columns as the legs of a woman, and Derrida's marginal notes as a male member in the act of penetration: "As the father's phallus works in the mother's hymen, between two legs, so Glas works at origins, between two columns, between Hegel and Genet."

According to Gayatri Spivak, the two columns should be seen as architectural elements: "capital, pyramid, pillar, belfry and so on." In between those columns Derrida attempts to find space for himself in the form of marginal notes. This fight for space is reminiscent of an adolescent rebellion against a looming father figure, Hegel, and Derrida notes that his own father died while he was writing Glas.

This rebellion against his inheritance also evident from the way in which he creates confusion by juxtaposing his initial, "D," to distracting red herrings: "The debris of d-words is scattered all over the pages. Derrida describes (décrit), writes d (dé-écrit), and cries d (dé-crit)." Spivak notes, "I can read Glas as a fiction of Derrida's proper name turning into a thing, [...] crypting the signature so that it becomes impossible to spell it out."

=== Autobiography and the signature ===
The specific literary genre problematized in Glas is autobiography, and its inquiry traces the very concept of the signature, which in autobiography marks the identity of the author with the narrator of the text. Following Plato, Derrida sees the relation between author and text as one of filiation, but unlike Plato's idea of filiation, which involves only the father and the child, for Derrida author alternates between the father and the mother of the text. In this relationship, the author's signature becomes the guarantor of the text's truth, "it becomes its surrogate parent," according to Jane Marie Todd. The Genet column discusses his autobiographical writings, where one of the issues is Genet's very name—it is not that of his father, but of his mother, who abandoned him shortly after birth. According to Todd, "in the mother who abandons her bastard child, leaving only her name, Derrida finds a figure for the author/text/signature relationship."

== Critical response ==
Glas is described as experimental and obscure. Literary theorist Geoffrey Hartman considered the text's playfulness "exhilarating to many within the discipline [of literary criticism]", acknowledging that to others it "may prove a disadvantage". Morris Dickstein, writing for The New York Sun, called it "a dizzying commentary on the work of Hegel and Genet".

According to Jane Marie Todd, Glas is a study of literary genre, and its seeming defiance of genre "allows this curious and challenging text [to offer] a direct contribution to literary theory: in both form and subject matter, it details a new way of viewing genre definitions." Derrida himself described the text as "a sort of a wake," in reference to James Joyce's Finnegans Wake; Alan Roughley argues,

It is clear that his reading of Joyce's text haunts the way in which Derrida has constructed his exploration of Hegel and Genet by positioning separate and discrete textual columns next to each other so that it is necessary to read intertextually and follow the ways in which the textual play operates across and between the margins or borders of the page(s) and space(s) separating the columns.

John Sturrock, reviewing the English translation of Glas for The New York Times, commented that "as a piece of writing it has no known genre". In his estimation reading the book is "a scandalously random experience" given the problem of how to read the two printed columns—consecutively or alternately from section to section. Though it is an "exuberantly clever, punning text", it "asks too much of one's patience and intelligence; our defense against a text declaring itself to be unreadable may be to call its author's bluff and simply leave it unread." Sturrock praises the English translation (by Richard Rand and John P. Leavey Jr.), but notes that a text such as Glas by definition cannot be translated and that Glas in English "mocks . . . the notion that translation achieves a semantic identity from one language to another." Sturrock's review was severely criticized in two responses: one writer reprimanded Sturrock for a "dismissive account", another pointed out that what Sturrock refers to as a "random experience" (of the text's format) is in fact reminiscent of the "sacred texts of Judaism". The English translation was praised by Ned Lukacher in Modern Language Notes as an "almost absolutely singular and exemplary achievement".

Compellingly, Glas has often been cited as evidence that deconstruction might theorize hypertext or that hypertext might instantiate deconstruction. In the early 1990s, George Landow declared Derrida's radical book Glas should be understood as "digitalized, hypertextual Derrida", and MLA president J. Hillis Miller associated it with "the new multi-linear multimedia hypertext that is rapidly becoming the characteristic mode of expression both in culture and in the study of cultural forms". Whereas Mark Taylor argues that "deconstruction theorizes writerly practices that anticipate hypertexts", Geoffrey Bennington advises that if writing had a privileged empirical form for Derrida, it would be the computer—yet on the other hand, "hypertexts can just as well be presented as a fulfillment of a metaphysical view of writing". Gregory Ulmer argues that Derrida's writings "already reflect an internalization of the electronic media", and Mark Poster holds that "computer writing instantiates the play that deconstruction raises only as a corrective". Moreover, as scholars like Peter Krapp observed, both Ted Nelson's Computer Lib / Dream Machines and Derrida's Glas look astonishingly similar and argue parallel points. Both books are the product of radical textual montage, using elaborate cut-and-paste strategies that caused problems in getting into print; both were reissued in the 1980s and hailed as influential for an entire generation: "Both were vigorously misrepresented by acolytes and detractors and unfairly associated with exclusively text-based approaches to contemporary media."

== Influence ==
According to Denis Donoghue and Morris Dickstein, Geoffrey Hartman is heavily influenced by Glas. Luc Ferry and Alain Renaut referred to Glas as the "quintessence of the discourse of the 'sixties", though Ned Lukacher notes that this amounts to "a glib dismissal of Derrida's masterpiece" by restricting its scope and enclosing it as a naive text whose erasure is willed by the writing subject, whereas Lukacher maintains that "Derrida never contests that there is always a subject that decides; his point is rather that the decision never took place on the grounds the subject thought it did and that the decision has effects that the subject cannot account for." According to Lukacher, "The publication of this translation and its brilliantly assembled apparatus will have a lasting and profound impact on philosophical and literary theory in English."

Italian painter Valerio Adami based three drawings on Glas, each called "Etude pour un dessin d'après Glas" (reprinted in his Derrière le miroir).

== Editions ==
- Jacques Derrida, Glas, (Paris: Galilée, 1974)
- Jacques Derrida, Glas, trans. John P. Leavey, Jr. & Richard Rand (Lincoln & London: University of Nebraska Press, 1986)
  - The English translation was accompanied by a companion volume, Glassary, by John P. Leavey (University of Nebraska Press, 1986) with an introduction by Gregory L. Ulmer and a preface by Derrida
- Jacques Derrida, Clang, trans. Geoffrey Bennington and David Wills (Minneapolis: University of Minnesota Press, 2021)
