= Right to Philosophy =

Book by Jacques Derrida

On the Right to Philosophy
- Cover of the first edition
- Author: Jacques Derrida
- Original title: Du droit à la philosophie
- Language: French
- Subject: Philosophy
- Publication date: 1990
- Publication place: France
- English publication date: 2002 (volume one); 2004 (volume two)
- Media type: Print

Right to Philosophy (French: Du droit à la philosophie) is a 1990 book by the French philosopher Jacques Derrida. It collects all of Derrida's writings, from 1975 till 1990, on the issue of the teaching of philosophy, the academic institution and the politics of philosophy in school and in the university. It has been translated in English in two volumes: Who's Afraid of Philosophy?: Right to Philosophy 1 (2002), and Eyes of the University: Right to Philosophy 2 (2004).

== Contents ==
Volume 1 contains the essay Where a Teaching Body Begins and How It Ends, (pp. 67–91) first published separately in 1976 in France; and the 1977 essay The Age of Hegel (pp. 117–157).
