= Speech and Phenomena =

1967 book by Jacques Derrida

- Cover of the first edition
- Author: Jacques Derrida
- Original title: La Voix et le Phénomène
- Translators: David B. Allison; Leonard Lawlor
- Language: French
- Subject: Edmund Husserl
- Publisher: Presses Universitaires de France
- Publication date: 1967
- Publication place: France
- English publication date: 1973
- Media type: Print
- Pages: 166 (English translation)
- ISBN: 0-8101-0590-X
- LC Class: 72-80565

Speech and Phenomena: And Other Essays on Husserl's Theory of Signs, or Voice and Phenomenon: Introduction to the Problem of the Sign in Husserl's Phenomenology, (French: La Voix et le Phénomène) is a book about the phenomenology of Edmund Husserl by the French philosopher Jacques Derrida, published in 1967 alongside Derrida's Of Grammatology and Writing and Difference. In Speech and Phenomena, Derrida puts forward an argument concerning Husserl's phenomenological project as a whole in relation to a key distinction in Husserl's theory of language in the Logical Investigations (1900–1901) and how this distinction relates to his description of internal time consciousness. Derrida commented that Speech and Phenomena is the "essay I value the most". The book is widely considered one of Derrida's most important philosophical works.

== Background ==
Speech and Phenomena is the culmination of a long period of study on the phenomenology of Edmund Husserl that Derrida began with his 1953/54 masters thesis The Problem of Genesis in Husserl's Phenomenology. This early thesis then formed the basis for his 1959 paper "'Genesis and Structure' and Phenomenology." Derrida also translated Husserl's "Origin of Geometry" from German into French and published his translation of this article with a book length introduction in 1962.

== Contents ==
Speech and Phenomena consists of an introduction and seven chapters: (1) Sign and Signs, (2) The Reduction of Indication, (3) Meaning as Soliloquy, (4) Meaning and Representation, (5) Signs and the Blink of an Eye, (6) The Voice that Keeps Silence, (7) The Supplement of Origin.

=== 1. Sign and Signs ===
Derrida identifies his theme in the first chapter as the twofold sense of the word sign for Husserl. Derrida notes that Husserl makes a conceptual distinction in the use of the word sign between expression and indication. For Husserl, Derrida argues, the expression and the indication are both signs but the latter is a sign without meaning or sense. Expression intends towards an ideal meaning and is "tied to the possibility of spoken language."

== Commentary ==
For commentary on Speech and Phenomena see Leonard Lawlor's book Derrida and Husserl: The Basic Problem of Phenomenology (2002) and Joshua Kates's book Essential History (2005).

== See also ==
- Positions
