= Points...: Interviews, 1974–1994 =

Book by Jacques Derrida

- Cover of the first edition
- Author: Jacques Derrida
- Original title: Points de suspension. Entretiens
- Translator: Peggy Kamuf
- Language: French
- Subject: Philosophy
- Publisher: Éditions Galilée
- Publication date: 1992
- Publication place: France
- English publication date: 1995
- Media type: Print
- Pages: 499 (English translation)
- ISBN: 0-8047-2488-1

Points...: Interviews, 1974–1994 (French: Points de suspension. Entretiens) is a 1995 book collecting interviews by the French philosopher Jacques Derrida. It contains the translation of all the interview of the 1992 French edition, plus two additional interviews, Honoris Causa (on Cambridge granting him the honorary doctorate) and "The Work of Intellectuals and the Press".
