= Rachel Bowlby =

British academic

Rachel Bowlby FBA (born 29 January 1957) is Professor of Comparative Literature Emeritus at University College London.

Her undergraduate studies at the University of Oxford (1975–79) were in Greek and Latin Literature (Hon Mods) and in English (BA). She has a PhD in Comparative Literature from Yale University (1983). Bowlby taught at the University of Sussex, the University of Oxford, and the University of York before joining UCL in 2004 as Lord Northcliffe Professor of English Literature. Between 2013 and 2016 Bowlby was Professor of Comparative Literature at Princeton University. She was Professor of Comparative Literature at UCL from 2015. Bowlby was elected as a Fellow of the British Academy in 2007. In 2024, she was elected to the American Philosophical Society.

== Select publications ==
- Émile Zola: Writing Modern Life 2025
- Unexpected Items: Shopping, Parenthood, Changing Feminist Stories 2024
- Back to the Shops: The High Street in History and the Future 2022
- Talking Walking: Essays in Cultural Criticism 2018
- Everyday Stories 2016
- A Child of One's Own: Parental Stories 2013
- Freudian Mythologies: Greek Tragedy and Modern Identities 2007
- Carried Away: The Invention of Modern Shopping. Faber & Faber, 2000
- Feminist Destinations and Further Essays on Virginia Woolf 1997
- Shopping with Freud 1993
- Still Crazy After All These Years: Women, Writing, Psychoanalysis 1992
- Virginia Woolf: Feminist Destinations 1988
- Just Looking: Consumer Culture in Dreiser, Gissing and Zola 1985
