= Sous rature =

Philosophical device by Martin Heidegger

Sous rature (French: [su ʁatyʁ]) is a strategic philosophical device originally developed by Martin Heidegger. Though never used in its contemporary French terminology by Heidegger, it is usually translated as 'under erasure', and involves the crossing out of a word within a text, but allowing it to remain legible and in place. Used extensively by Jacques Derrida, it signifies that a word is "inadequate yet necessary"; that a particular signifier is not wholly suitable for the concept it represents, but must be used as the constraints of our language offer nothing better.

In the philosophy of deconstruction, sous rature has been described as the typographical expression that seeks to identify sites within texts where key terms and concepts may be paradoxical or self-undermining, rendering their meaning undecidable. To extend this notion, deconstruction and the practice of sous rature also seek to demonstrate that meaning is derived from difference, not by reference to a pre-existing notion or freestanding idea.

== History ==
Sous rature as a literary practice originated in the works of German philosopher Martin Heidegger (1889–1976). The practice of placing words or terms under erasure first appeared in Heidegger's work The Fundamental Concepts of Metaphysics, Heidegger's lecture course of 1929/30. And subsequently in a letter he penned to Ernst Jünger in 1956 titled "Zur Seinsfrage" (The Question of Being), in which Heidegger seeks to define nihilism. During the course of the letter, Heidegger also begins to speculate about the problematic nature of defining anything, let alone words. In particular, the meaning of the term ‘Being’ is contested and Heidegger crosses out the word, but lets both the deletion and the word remain. “Since the word is inaccurate, it is crossed out. Since it is necessary, it remains legible.” According to the Heideggerian model, erasure expressed the problem of presence and absence of meaning in language. Heidegger was concerned with trying to return the absent meaning to the present meaning and the placing of a word or term under erasure “simultaneously recognised and questioned the term’s meaning and accepted use”.

French philosopher Jacques Derrida (1930–2004) adopted this technique and further explored the implications of Heidegger's erasure and its application in the wider setting of deconstructive literary theory. Derrida extended the problem of presence and absence to include the notion that erasure does not mark a lost presence, rather the potential impossibility of presence altogether — in other words, the potential impossibility of univocity of meaning ever having been attached to the word or term in the first place. Ultimately, Derrida argued, it was not just the particular signs that were placed under erasure, but the whole system of signification.

== See also ==
- Deconstruction
- Literary criticism
- Literary theory
- Post-structuralism
- Semiotics
