= Ethics, Institutions, and the Right to Philosophy =

2002 book by J. Derrida and P. Trifonas

Book cover

Ethics, Institutions, and the Right to Philosophy is a 2002 English book edited by Peter Pericles Trifonas which contains a lecture and a roundtable discussion by the French philosopher Jacques Derrida, and an essay by Trifonas himself. Derrida's lecture is titled, The Right to Philosophy from the Cosmopolitical Point of View.

== Contents ==
The first chapter is the lecture The Right to Philosophy from the Cosmopolitical Point of View, held in 1991 by French philosopher Jacques Derrida at UNESCO. The second chapter of the book is a roundtable discussion in which Derrida responded to other philosophers' questions about the lecture of first chapter; participants at the roundtable were Hazard Adams, Ernst Behler, Hendrick Birus, Wolfgang Iser, Murray Krieger, J. Hillis Miller, K. Ludwig Pfeiffer, Bill Readings, Ching-hsien Wang, and Pauline Yu; the roundtable was held in 1994 and published by journal Surfaces.
