= Mark Poster =

American philosopher

Mark S. Poster
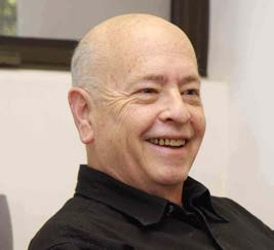
- Born: July 5, 1941
- Died: October 10, 2012 (aged 71)

Philosophical work
- Era: 20th / 21st-century philosophy
- Region: Western Philosophy
- School: Post-Structuralism · Marxism · Post-Marxism · Critical Theory · Media Studies
- Main interests: Intellectual History · Mass Media · New Media
- Notable ideas: Mode of information

Mark Poster (July 5, 1941 – October 10, 2012) was Professor Emeritus of History and Film and Media Studies at UC Irvine, where he also taught in the Critical Theory Emphasis. He was pivotal to "bringing French critical theory to the U.S., and went on to analyse contemporary media."

== Early life ==
Poster was born in New York on 5 July 1941, studied at the University of Pennsylvania Wharton School and completed a PhD in history at New York University in 1968. His research interests included European Intellectual and Cultural History, Existentialism, Marxism, Critical Theory, and Media Studies.

== Career ==
He was known for surveying the work of Henri Lefebvre, Jean-Paul Sartre and Michel Foucault. He applied the ideas of these and other French theorists (including Jean Baudrillard, Louis Althusser, Gilles Deleuze and Jacques Derrida) to digital new media of the late 20th and early 21st century (including television, databases, hypertext and the internet).

Poster sought to politicize the issue of the use and development of the internet by emphasizing its possibilities for liberatory political change, while acknowledging the existence of a deep digital divide, as well as the interests of transnational corporations and national governments.

Poster was also co-editor of the "Electronic Mediations" book series at the University of Minnesota Press, which includes almost 40 titles which explore the humanistic and social implications of the internet, virtual reality technologies, video games, literary hypertexts, and new media art forms.

== Death ==
Poster died on 10 October 2012 of pneumonia and is survived by his wife, Annette Schlichter, and two daughters.

== Books ==
- The Utopian Thought of Restif de la Bretonne (1971)
- Existential Marxism in Postwar France: From Sartre to Althusser (1975)
- Critical Theory of the Family (1978)
- Sartre's Marxism (1982)
- Foucault, Marxism, and History: Mode of Production Versus Mode of Information (1985)
- Critical Theory and Poststructuralism: In Search of a Context (1989)
- The Mode of Information: Post-structuralism and Social Contexts (1990)
- The Second Media Age (1995). Chapter 2 available as Postmodern Virtualities
- What's the Matter with the Internet? (Electronic Mediations series) (2001)
- The Information Subject (2001)
- Information Please: Culture and Politics in the Age of Digital Machines (2006)
- Deleuze and New Technology (2009)
