= Acts of Literature =

- Cover of the first edition
- Author: Jacques Derrida
- Subject: Literature
- Published: 1991
- Media type: Print
- Pages: 472

Acts of Literature is a 1991 philosophical and literary book based on essays by the French philosopher Jacques Derrida. The book is the first collection of Derrida's essays on Western-culture literary texts. Derek Attridge edited the book in close association with Derrida himself.

== Summary ==
Derrida discusses authors such as Jean-Jacques Rousseau, Stéphane Mallarmé, James Joyce, William Shakespeare, and Franz Kafka.

== Influence ==
A part highly cited by scholars is the chapter dedicated to James Joyce: ‘Ulysses’ Gramophone: Hear Say Yes In Joyce. (pp. 253–309).

== Editions ==
- 1st edition published by Routledge, November 20, 1991. ISBN 978-0-415-90057-7.
