= Pharmakos =

Ancient Greek religious ritual

A pharmakós (Greek: φαρμακός, plural pharmakoi) in Ancient Greek religion was the ritualistic sacrifice or exile of a human scapegoat or victim.

== Ritual ==
A slave, a disabled person, or a criminal was chosen and expelled from the community at times of disaster (famine, invasion or plague) or at times of calendrical crisis. It was believed that this would bring about purification. On the first day of the Thargelia, a festival of Apollo at Athens, two men, the pharmakoi, were led out as if to be sacrificed as an expiation.

Some scholia state that pharmakoi were actually sacrificed (thrown from a cliff or burned), but many modern scholars reject this, arguing that the earliest source for the pharmakos (the iambic satirist Hipponax) shows the pharmakoi being beaten and stoned, but not executed.

In Aesop in Delphi (1961), Anton Wiechers discussed the parallels between the legendary biography of Aesop (in which he is unjustly tried and executed by the Delphians) and the pharmakos ritual. For example, Aesop is grotesquely deformed, as was the pharmakos in some traditions; and Aesop was thrown from a cliff, as was the pharmakos in some traditions.

Gregory Nagy, in Best of the Achaeans (1979), compared Aesop's pharmakos death to the "worst" of the Achaeans in the Iliad, Thersites. More recently, both Daniel Ogden, The Crooked Kings of Ancient Greece (1997) and Todd Compton, Victim of the Muses: Poet as Scapegoat, Warrior and Hero (2006) examine poet pharmakoi. Compton surveys important poets who were exiled, executed or suffered unjust trials, either in history, legend or Greek or Indo-European myth.

== Modern interpretations ==
Walter Burkert and René Girard have written influential modern interpretations of the pharmakos rite. Burkert shows that humans were sacrificed or expelled after being fed well, and, according to some sources, their ashes were scattered to the ocean. This was a purification ritual, a form of societal catharsis. Girard likewise discusses the connection between catharsis, sacrifice, and purification. Some scholars have connected the practice of ostracism, in which a prominent politician was exiled from Athens after a vote using pottery pieces, with the pharmakos custom. However, the ostracism exile was only for a fixed time, as opposed to the finality of the pharmakos execution or expulsion.

Pharmakos is also used as a vital term in Derridean deconstruction. In his essay "Plato's Pharmacy", Jacques Derrida deconstructs several texts by Plato, such as Phaedrus, and reveals the inter-connection between the word chain pharmakeia–pharmakon–pharmakeus and the notably absent word pharmakos. In doing so, he attacks the boundary between inside and outside, declaring that the outside (pharmakos, never uttered by Plato) is always-already present right behind the inside (pharmakeia–pharmakon–pharmakeus). As a concept, Pharmakos can be said to be related to other Derridian terms such as "Trace".

== See also ==
- Etymology of pharmacy
- Modes of persuasion, which include ethos, pathos, logos and kairos
