= Maurice de Gandillac =

French philosopher (1906–2006)

Maurice de Gandillac (French: [də ɡɑ̃dijak]; 14 February 1906 – 18 April 2006) was a French philosopher. He was born in Koléa, French Algeria and died in Neuilly-sur-Seine, France.

He studied at the École Normale Supérieure and wrote his doctoral thesis at the Sorbonne under Étienne Gilson on the Renaissance philosopher Nicholas of Cusa.

In 1946, he was appointed professor in the history of medieval and Renaissance philosophy at the Sorbonne. He supervised (or examined) the doctoral dissertations of numerous students, including Kostas Axelos, Gilles Deleuze, Jacques Derrida, and Michel Foucault. He also taught Louis Althusser and Jean-François Lyotard.
