= Collège philosophique =

Collège philosophique was an association founded in 1946 by Jean Wahl, located in the Latin Quarter in Paris.

Wahl created it because he felt the lack of an alternative to the Sorbonne (University of Paris), where it would be possible to give voice to non-academic discourses; it became the place where non-conformist intellectuals—and those believing themselves to be so—were tolerated and given consideration.

After Wahl's death in 1974, it inspired the foundation of the Collège de philosophie.

== Notable conferences ==
On March 4, 1963, it hosted the conference from which originated the rift between Jacques Derrida and Michel Foucault. Derrida gave the lecture Cogito and the History of Madness, a critique of Foucault, that possibly also prompted Foucault to write his works The Order of Things (1966) and The Archaeology of Knowledge (1969).

== See also ==
- Collège international de philosophie
- Revue de métaphysique et de morale
