= Jacques Derrida =

French philosopher (1930–2004)

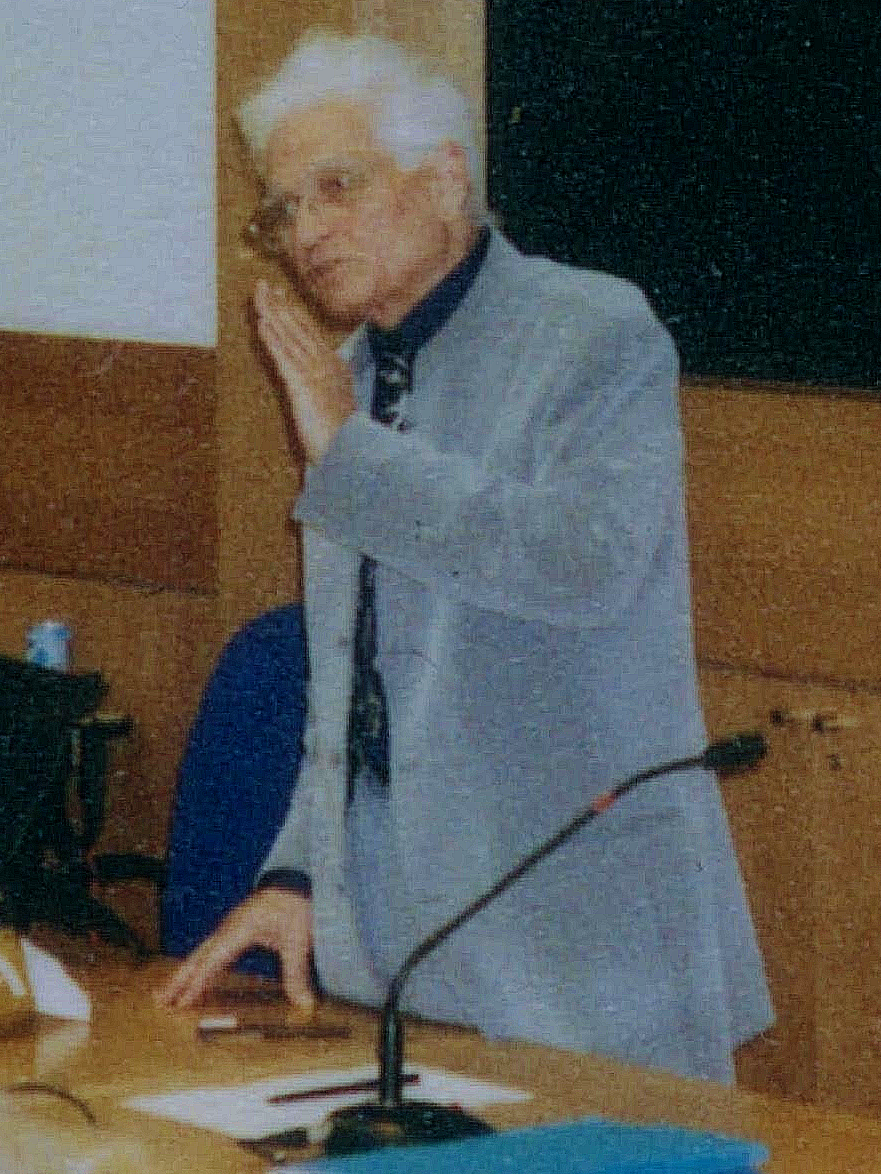
- Derrida lecturing at EHESS, 1990s
- Born: Jackie Élie Derrida; 15 July 1930; El Biar, French Algeria
- Died: 9 October 2004 (aged 74); Paris, France
- Spouse: Marguerite Aucouturier (m. 1957)
- Children: 3, including Pierre Alféri

Education
- Education: École Normale Supérieure (BA, MA, Dr. cand.); Harvard University; University of Paris (DrE)
- Doctoral advisor: Jean-Toussaint Desanti
- Other advisors: Maurice de Gandillac; Jean Hyppolite

Philosophical work
- Era: 20th-century philosophy
- Region: Western philosophy
- School: Continental philosophy; Post-structuralism (disavowed); Deconstruction; Radical hermeneutics
- Institutions: University of Paris VIII; École Normale Supérieure; École des Hautes Études en Sciences Sociales; Collège international de philosophie; European Graduate School; University of California, Irvine; Yale University
- Doctoral students: Joseph Cohen; Catherine Malabou; Bernard Stiegler; Raphaël Zagury-Orly
- Notable students: Francis Fukuyama; Sarah Kofman; Jean-Luc Marion; Jean-Luc Nancy; Gabriel Rockhill
- Notable ideas: Deconstruction; différance; phallogocentrism; free play; arche-writing; metaphysics of presence; invagination; pharmakon; trace; hauntology; sous rature; khôra; iterability

Jacques Derrida (/ˈdɛriːdɑː/; French: [ʒak dɛʁida]; born Jackie Élie Derrida; 15 July 1930 – 9 October 2004) was a French philosopher. He developed the philosophy of deconstruction, which he applied in some of his texts, and which he developed through close readings of the linguistics of Ferdinand de Saussure and Husserlian and Heideggerian phenomenology. He is one of the major figures associated with post-structuralism and postmodern philosophy although he distanced himself from post-structuralism and disavowed the word "postmodernity".

During his career, Derrida published over 40 books, together with hundreds of essays and public presentations. He has had a significant influence on the humanities and social sciences, including philosophy, literature, law, anthropology, historiography, applied linguistics, sociolinguistics, psychoanalysis, music, architecture, and political theory.

Into the 2000s, his work retained major academic influence throughout the United States, continental Europe, South America and all other countries where continental philosophy has been predominant, particularly in debates around ontology, epistemology (especially concerning social sciences), ethics, aesthetics, hermeneutics, and the philosophy of language. For the last two decades of his life, Derrida was Professor in Humanities at the University of California, Irvine. In most of the Anglosphere, where analytic philosophy is dominant, Derrida's influence is most presently felt in literary studies due to his longstanding interest in language and his association with prominent literary critics. He also influenced architecture (in the form of deconstructivism), music (especially in the musical atmosphere of hauntology), art, and art criticism.

Particularly in his later writings, Derrida addressed ethical and political themes in his work. Some critics consider Speech and Phenomena (1967) to be his most important work, while others cite Of Grammatology (1967), Writing and Difference (1967), and Margins of Philosophy (1972). These writings influenced various activists and political movements. He became a well-known and influential public figure, while his approach to philosophy and notoriously abstruse work made him controversial.

== Early life and education ==
Derrida was born on 15 July 1930, in a summer home in El Biar (Algiers), Algeria. His father was Haïm Aaron Prosper Charles (known as "Aimé") Derrida (1896–1970), who worked all his life for the wine and spirits company Tachet, including as a traveling salesman. The elder Derrida enlisted his son to be a "docile employee," waking him early to help with business accounts at the dining-room table, which Jacques later recalled as "exhausting" and "humiliating." His mother was Georgette Sultana Esther (1901–1991), daughter of Moïse Safar. The Safar family was Sephardic Jewish (originally from Toledo) and became French in 1870 when the Crémieux Decree granted full French citizenship to the Jews of Algeria. His parents named him "Jackie", "which they considered to be an American name", although he would later adopt a more "correct" version of his first name when he moved to Paris; some reports indicate that he was named Jackie after the American child actor Jackie Coogan, who had become well known around the world via his role in the 1921 Charlie Chaplin film The Kid. He was also given the middle name Élie after his paternal uncle Eugène Eliahou, at his circumcision; this name was not recorded on his birth certificate unlike those of his siblings, and he would later call it his "hidden name".

Derrida was the third of five children. His elder brother Paul Moïse died at less than three months old, the year before Derrida was born, leading him to suspect throughout his life his role as a replacement for his deceased brother. Derrida spent his youth in Algiers and in El-Biar.

On the first day of the school year in 1942, French administrators in Algeria—implementing antisemitism quotas set by the Vichy government—expelled Derrida from his lycée. He secretly skipped school for a year rather than attend the Jewish lycée formed by displaced teachers and students, and also took part in numerous football competitions (he dreamed of becoming a professional player). In this adolescent period, Derrida found in the works of philosophers and writers (such as Rousseau, Nietzsche, and Gide) an instrument of revolt against family and society. His reading also included Camus and Sartre. He was also drawn into works by André Gide, Friedrich Nietzsche, and Jean Jacques Rousseau in his teenage years.

In the late 1940s, he attended the Lycée Bugeaud, in Algiers; in 1949 he moved to Paris, attending the Lycée Louis-le-Grand, where his professor of philosophy was Étienne Borne. At that time he prepared for his entrance exam to the prestigious École Normale Supérieure (ENS); after failing the exam on his first try, he passed it on the second, and was admitted in 1952. On his first day at ENS, Derrida met Louis Althusser, with whom he became friends. A professor of his, Jan Czarnecki, was a progressive Protestant who would become a signer of the Manifesto of the 121. After visiting the Husserl Archive in Leuven, Belgium (1953–1954), he completed his master's degree in philosophy (diplôme d'études supérieures) on Edmund Husserl. He then passed the highly competitive agrégation exam in 1956. Derrida received a grant for studies at Harvard University, and he spent the 1956–57 academic year reading James Joyce's Ulysses at the Widener Library.

== Career ==
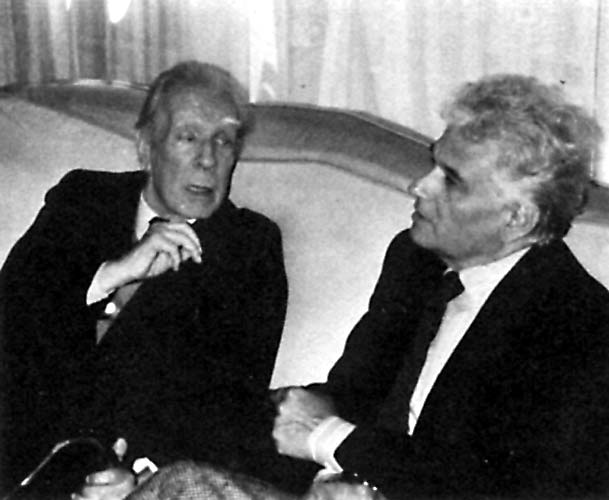
Derrida and Jorge Luis Borges (left), 1985

During the Algerian War of Independence of 1954–1962, Derrida asked to teach soldiers' children in lieu of military service, teaching French and English from 1957 to 1959. Following the war, from 1960 to 1964, Derrida taught philosophy at the Sorbonne, where he was an assistant of Suzanne Bachelard (daughter of Gaston Bachelard), Georges Canguilhem, Paul Ricœur (who in these years coined the term hermeneutics of suspicion), and Jean Wahl. His wife, Marguerite, gave birth to their first child, Pierre, in 1963. In 1964, on the recommendation of Louis Althusser and Jean Hyppolite, Derrida received a permanent teaching position at the ENS, which he kept until 1984. In 1965 Derrida began an association with the Tel Quel group of literary and philosophical theorists, which lasted for seven years. Derrida's subsequent distance from the Tel Quel group, after 1971, was connected to his reservations about their embrace of Maoism and of the Chinese Cultural Revolution.

With "Structure, Sign, and Play in the Discourse of the Human Sciences", his contribution to a 1966 colloquium on structuralism at Johns Hopkins University, his work began to gain international prominence. At the same colloquium Derrida would meet Jacques Lacan and Paul de Man, the latter an important interlocutor in the years to come. A second son, Jean, was born in 1967. In the same year, Derrida published his first three books—Writing and Difference, Speech and Phenomena, and Of Grammatology.

In 1980, he received his first honorary doctorate (from Columbia University) and was awarded his State doctorate (doctorat d'État) by submitting to the University of Paris ten of his previously published books in conjunction with a defense of his intellectual project under the title "L'inscription de la philosophie : Recherches sur l'interprétation de l'écriture" ("Inscription in Philosophy: Research on the Interpretation of Writing"). The text of Derrida's defense was based on an abandoned draft doctoral thesis he had prepared in 1957 under the direction of Jean Hyppolite, along with Maurice de Gandillac, at the ENS entitled "The Ideality of the Literary Object" ("L'idéalité de l'objet littéraire"); his 1980 dissertation was subsequently published in English translation as "The Time of a Thesis: Punctuations". In 1983, Derrida collaborated with Ken McMullen on the film Ghost Dance. Derrida appears in the film as himself and also contributed to the script.

Derrida traveled widely and held a series of visiting and permanent positions. Derrida became full professor (directeur d'études) at the École des Hautes Études en Sciences Sociales in Paris from 1984 (he had been elected at the end of 1983). With François Châtelet and others he in 1983 co-founded the Collège international de philosophie (CIPH; 'International college of philosophy'), an institution intended to provide a location for philosophical research which could not be carried out elsewhere in the academia. He was elected as its first president. In 1985 Sylviane Agacinski gave birth to Derrida's third child, Daniel.

On 8 May 1985, Derrida was elected a Foreign Honorary Member of the American Academy of Arts and Sciences, to Class IV – Humanities, Section 3 – Criticism and Philology.

In 1986, Derrida became Professor of the Humanities at the University of California, Irvine, where he taught until shortly before his death in 2004. His papers were filed in the university archives. When Derrida's colleague, Dragan Kujundzic, was accused of sexual assault, Derrida wrote a letter to then-Chancellor Cicerone saying "if the scandalous procedure" against Kujundzic was not "interrupted or cancelled," he would end all his "relations with UCI." Regarding his archival papers, there would be "another consequence: since I never take back what I have given, my papers would of course remain the property of UCI and the Special Collections department of the library. However, it goes without saying that the spirit in which I contributed to the constitution of these archives (which is still underway and growing every year) would have been seriously damaged. Without renouncing my commitments, I would regret having made them and would reduce their fulfillment to the barest minimum." After Derrida's death, his widow and sons said they wanted copies of UCI's archives shared with the Institute of Contemporary Publishing Archives in France. The university had sued in an attempt to get manuscripts and correspondence from Derrida's widow and children that it believed the philosopher had promised to UC Irvine's collection, although it dropped the suit in 2007.

Derrida was a regular visiting professor at several other major American and European universities, including Johns Hopkins University, Yale University, New York University, Stony Brook University, The New School for Social Research, and European Graduate School.

He was awarded honorary doctorates by the University of Cambridge (1992), Columbia University, The New School for Social Research, the University of Essex, Katholieke Universiteit Leuven, the University of Silesia, the University of Coimbra, the University of Athens, and many others around the world. In 2001, he received the Adorno-Preis from the University of Frankfurt.

Derrida's honorary degree at Cambridge was protested by leading philosophers in the analytic tradition. Philosophers including Quine, Marcus, and Armstrong wrote a letter to the university objecting that "Derrida's work does not meet accepted standards of clarity and rigour," and "Academic status based on what seems to us to be little more than semi-intelligible attacks upon the values of reason, truth, and scholarship is not, we submit, sufficient grounds for the awarding of an honorary degree in a distinguished university".

Late in his life, Derrida participated in making two biographical documentaries, D'ailleurs, Derrida (Derrida's Elsewhere) by Safaa Fathy (1999), and Derrida by Kirby Dick and Amy Ziering Kofman (2002).

On 19 February 2003, with the 2003 invasion of Iraq impending, René Major moderated a debate entitled "Pourquoi La Guerre Aujourd'hui?" between Derrida and Jean Baudrillard, co-hosted by Major's Institute for Advanced Studies in Psychoanalysis and Le Monde Diplomatique. The debate discussed the relation between terrorist attacks and the invasion.

== Personal life and death ==
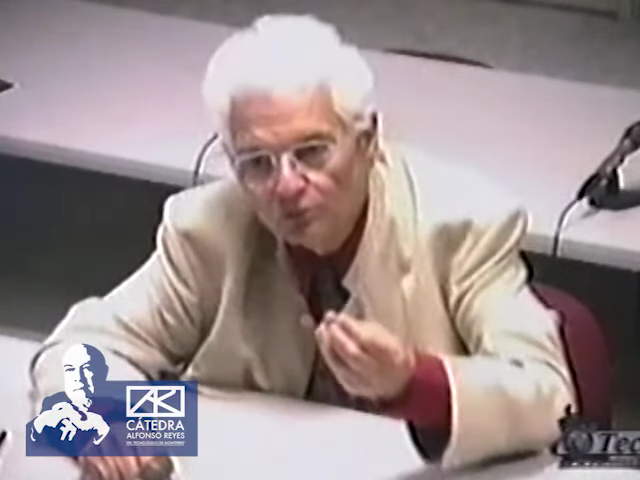
Derrida giving a lecture in Mexico, May 2002

In June 1957, he married the psychoanalyst Marguerite Aucouturier in Boston.

Derrida was diagnosed with pancreatic cancer in 2002. He died during surgery in a hospital in Paris in the early hours of 9 October 2004.

At the time of his death, Derrida had agreed to go for the summer to University of Heidelberg as holder of the Gadamer professorship. Peter Hommelhoff, Rector at Heidelberg at that time, summarized Derrida's place as: "Beyond the boundaries of philosophy as an academic discipline he was a leading intellectual figure not only for the humanities but for the cultural perception of a whole age."

== Philosophy ==
Derrida referred to himself as a historian. He questioned assumptions of the Western philosophical tradition and also more broadly Western culture. By questioning the dominant discourses and trying to modify them, he attempted to democratize the university scene and to politicize it. Derrida called his challenge to the assumptions of Western culture "deconstruction". On some occasions, Derrida referred to deconstruction as a radicalization of a certain spirit of Marxism.

With his detailed readings of works from Plato to Rousseau to Heidegger, Derrida frequently argues that Western philosophy has uncritically allowed metaphorical depth models to govern its conception of language and consciousness. He sees these often unacknowledged assumptions as part of a "metaphysics of presence" to which philosophy has bound itself. This "logocentrism", Derrida argues, creates "marked" or hierarchized binary oppositions that affect everything from the conception of speech's relation to writing to the understanding of racial difference. Deconstruction is an attempt to expose and undermine such "metaphysics".

Derrida approaches texts as constructed around binary oppositions, which all speech must articulate if it is to make any sense whatsoever. This approach to text is, in a broad sense, influenced by the semiology of Ferdinand de Saussure. Saussure, considered to be one of the fathers of structuralism, posited that terms get their meaning in reciprocal determination with other terms inside language.

Perhaps Derrida's most quoted and famous assertion, which appears in an essay on Rousseau in his book Of Grammatology (1967), is the statement that "there is no outside-text" (il n'y a pas de hors-texte). Critics of Derrida have been often accused of having mistranslated the phrase in French to suggest he had written "Il n'y a rien en dehors du texte" ("There is nothing outside the text") and of having widely disseminated this translation to make it appear that Derrida is suggesting that nothing exists but words. Derrida once explained that this assertion, "which for some has become a sort of slogan, in general so badly understood, of deconstruction ... means nothing else: there is nothing outside context. In this form, which says exactly the same thing, the formula would doubtless have been less shocking."

=== Early works ===
Derrida began his career examining the limits of phenomenology. His first lengthy academic manuscript, written as a dissertation for his diplôme d'études supérieures and submitted in 1954, concerned the work of Edmund Husserl. Gary Banham has said that the dissertation is "in many respects the most ambitious of Derrida's interpretations with Husserl, not merely in terms of the number of works addressed but also in terms of the extraordinarily focused nature of its investigation." In 1962 he published Edmund Husserl's Origin of Geometry: An Introduction, which contained his own translation of Husserl's essay. Many elements of Derrida's thought were already present in this work. In the interviews collected in Positions (1972), Derrida said:

In this essay the problematic of writing was already in place as such, bound to the irreducible structure of 'deferral' in its relationships to consciousness, presence, science, history and the history of science, the disappearance or delay of the origin, etc. ...this essay can be read as the other side (recto or verso, as you wish) of Speech and Phenomena.

— Derrida, 1967, interview with Henri Ronse

Derrida first received major attention outside France with his lecture, "Structure, Sign, and Play in the Discourse of the Human Sciences," delivered at Johns Hopkins University in 1966 (and subsequently included in Writing and Difference). The conference at which this paper was delivered was concerned with structuralism, then at the peak of its influence in France, but only beginning to gain attention in the United States. Derrida differed from other participants by his lack of explicit commitment to structuralism, having already been critical of the movement. He praised the accomplishments of structuralism but also maintained reservations about its internal limitations; this has led US academics to label his thought as a form of post-structuralism.

The effect of Derrida's paper was such that, by the time the conference proceedings were published in 1970, the title of the collection had become The Structuralist Controversy. The conference was also where he met Paul de Man, who would be a close friend and source of great controversy, as well as where he first met the French psychoanalyst Jacques Lacan, with whose work Derrida had a mixed relationship.

=== Phenomenology vs structuralism debate (1959) ===
In the early 1960s, Derrida began speaking and writing publicly, addressing the most topical debates at the time. One of these was the new and increasingly fashionable movement of structuralism, which was being widely favoured as the successor to the phenomenology approach, the latter having been started by Husserl sixty years earlier. Derrida's countercurrent take on the issue, at a prominent international conference, was so influential that it reframed the discussion from a celebration of the triumph of structuralism to a "phenomenology vs structuralism debate".

Phenomenology, as envisioned by Husserl, is a method of philosophical inquiry that rejects the rationalist bias that has dominated Western thought since Plato in favor of a method of reflective attentiveness that discloses the individual's "lived experience"; for those with a more phenomenological bent, the goal was to understand experience by comprehending and describing its genesis, the process of its emergence from an origin or event. For the structuralists, this was a false problem, and the "depth" of experience could in fact only be an effect of structures which are not themselves experiential.

In that context, in 1959, Derrida asked the question: Must not structure have a genesis, and must not the origin, the point of genesis, be already structured, in order to be the genesis of something? In other words, every structural or "synchronic" phenomenon has a history, and the structure cannot be understood without understanding its genesis. At the same time, in order that there be movement or potential, the origin cannot be some pure unity or simplicity, but must already be articulated—complex—such that from it a "diachronic" process can emerge. This original complexity must not be understood as an original positing, but more like a default of origin, which Derrida refers to as iterability, inscription, or textuality. It is this thought of originary complexity that sets Derrida's work in motion, and from which all of its terms are derived, including "deconstruction".

Derrida's method consisted of demonstrating the forms and varieties of this originary complexity, and their multiple consequences in many fields. He achieved this by conducting thorough, careful, sensitive, and yet transformational readings of philosophical and literary texts to determine what aspects of those texts run counter to their apparent systematicity (structural unity) or intended sense (authorial genesis). By demonstrating the aporias and ellipses of thought, Derrida hoped to show the infinitely subtle ways in which this originary complexity, which by definition cannot ever be completely known, works its structuring and destructuring effects.

=== 1967–1972 ===
Derrida's interests crossed disciplinary boundaries, and his knowledge of a wide array of diverse material was reflected in the three collections of work published in 1967: Speech and Phenomena, Of Grammatology (initially submitted as a doctorat de spécialité thesis under Maurice de Gandillac), and Writing and Difference.

On several occasions, Derrida has acknowledged his debt to Husserl and Heidegger, and stated that without them he would not have said a single word. Among the questions asked in these essays are "What is 'meaning', what are its historical relationships to what is purportedly identified under the rubric 'voice' as a value of presence, presence of the object, presence of meaning to consciousness, self-presence in so called living speech and in self-consciousness?" In another essay in Writing and Difference entitled "Violence and Metaphysics: An Essay on the Thought of Emmanuel Levinas", the roots of another major theme in Derrida's thought emerge: the Other as opposed to the Same "Deconstructive analysis deprives the present of its prestige and exposes it to something tout autre, "wholly other", beyond what is foreseeable from the present, beyond the horizon of the "same"." Other than Rousseau, Husserl, Heidegger and Levinas, these three books discussed, and/or relied upon, the works of many philosophers and authors, including linguist Saussure, Hegel, Foucault, Bataille, Descartes, anthropologist Lévi-Strauss, paleontologist Leroi-Gourhan, psychoanalyst Freud, and writers such as Jabès and Artaud.

This collection of three books, published in 1967, elaborated Derrida's theoretical framework. Derrida attempts to approach the very heart of the Western intellectual tradition, characterizing this tradition as "a search for a transcendental being that serves as the origin or guarantor of meaning". The attempt to "ground the meaning relations constitutive of the world in an instance that itself lies outside all relationality" was referred to by Heidegger as logocentrism, and Derrida argues that the philosophical enterprise is essentially logocentric, and that this is a paradigm inherited from Judaism and Hellenism. He in turn describes logocentrism as phallocratic, patriarchal and masculinist. Derrida contributed to "the understanding of certain deeply hidden philosophical presuppositions and prejudices in Western culture", arguing that the whole philosophical tradition rests on arbitrary dichotomous categories (such as sacred/profane, signifier/signified, mind/body), and that any text contains implicit hierarchies, "by which an order is imposed on reality and by which a subtle repression is exercised, as these hierarchies exclude, subordinate, and hide the various potential meanings." Derrida refers to his procedure for uncovering and unsettling these dichotomies as deconstruction of Western culture.

In 1968, he published his influential essay "Plato's Pharmacy" in the French journal Tel Quel. This essay was later collected in Dissemination, one of three books published by Derrida in 1972, along with the essay collection Margins of Philosophy and the collection of interviews entitled Positions.

=== 1973–1980 ===
Starting in 1972, Derrida published more than one book per year on average. Derrida continued to produce important works, such as Glas (1974) and The Post Card: From Socrates to Freud and Beyond (1980).

Derrida received increasing attention in the United States after 1972, when he was a regular visiting professor and lecturer at several major American universities. In the 1980s, during the American culture wars, conservatives started a dispute over Derrida's influence and legacy upon American intellectuals, and claimed that he influenced American literary critics and theorists more than academic philosophers.

=== Of Spirit (1987) ===
On 14 March 1987, Derrida presented at the CIPH conference entitled "Heidegger: Open Questions", a lecture which was published in October 1987 as Of Spirit: Heidegger and the Question. It follows the shifting role of Geist (spirit) through Heidegger's work, noting that in 1927 "spirit" was one of the philosophical terms he set out to dismantle. With his Nazi political engagement in 1933, however, Heidegger came out as a champion of the "German Spirit", and only withdrew from an exalting interpretation of the term in 1953. Derrida asks, "What of this meantime?" His book connects in a number of respects with his long engagement of Heidegger (such as "The Ends of Man" in Margins of Philosophy, his Paris seminar on philosophical nationality and nationalism in the mid-1980s, and the essays published in English as Geschlecht and Geschlecht II). He considers "four guiding threads" of Heideggerian philosophy that form "the knot of this Geflecht [braid]": "the question of the question", "the essence of technology", "the discourse of animality", and "epochality" or "the hidden teleology or the narrative order."

Of Spirit contributes to the long debate on Heidegger's Nazism and appeared at the same time as the French publication of a book by a previously unknown Chilean writer, Victor Farías, who charged that Heidegger's philosophy amounted to a wholehearted endorsement of the Nazi Sturmabteilung (SA) faction. Derrida responded to Farías in an interview, "Heidegger, the Philosopher's Hell," and a subsequent article, "Comment donner raison? How to Concede, with Reasons?" He called Farías a weak reader of Heidegger's thought, adding that much of the evidence Farías and his supporters touted as new had long been known within the philosophical community.

=== 1990s: political and ethical themes ===
Some have argued that Derrida's work took a political and ethical "turn" in the 1990s. Texts cited as evidence of such a turn include Force of Law (1990), as well as Specters of Marx (1994) and Politics of Friendship (1994). Some refer to The Gift of Death as evidence that he began more directly applying deconstruction to the relationship between ethics and religion. In this work, Derrida interprets passages from the Bible, particularly on Abraham and the Sacrifice of Isaac, and from Søren Kierkegaard's Fear and Trembling.

However, scholars such as Leonard Lawlor, Robert Magliola, and Nicole Anderson have argued that the "turn" has been exaggerated. Some, including Derrida himself, have argued that much of the philosophical work done in his "political turn" can be dated to earlier essays.

Derrida develops an ethicist view respecting to hospitality, exploring the idea that two types of hospitalities exist, conditional and unconditional. Though this contributed to the works of many scholars, Derrida was seriously criticized for this.

Derrida's contemporary readings of Emmanuel Levinas, Walter Benjamin, Carl Schmitt, Jan Patočka, on themes such as law, justice, responsibility, and friendship, had a significant impact on fields beyond philosophy. Derrida and Deconstruction influenced aesthetics, literary criticism, architecture, film theory, anthropology, sociology, historiography, law, psychoanalysis, theology, feminism, gay and lesbian studies and political theory. Jean-Luc Nancy, Richard Rorty, Geoffrey Hartman, Harold Bloom, Rosalind Krauss, Hélène Cixous, Julia Kristeva, Duncan Kennedy, Gary Peller, Drucilla Cornell, Alan Hunt, Hayden White, Mario Kopić, and Alun Munslow are some of the authors who have been influenced by deconstruction.

Derrida’s interpretation of Schmitt—particularly in relation to sovereignty, decision, and law—has been widely discussed in legal and political philosophy. In works such as The Politics of Friendship and "Force of Law: The 'Mystical Foundation of Authority'", Derrida emphasizes the relation between decision and undecidability, and the tension between normativity and singularity.

This interpretation has been critically examined by the Chilean legal philosopher Hugo E. Herrera. Herrera argues that Derrida’s reading tends to overlook a distinction central to Schmitt’s legal thought, namely that between technical rationality and juridical reasoning. According to Herrera, Derrida interprets Schmitt’s conception of decision in terms of calculability and control, whereas Schmitt explicitly characterizes technical rationality as oriented toward prediction and manipulation, and contrasts it with a juridical form of reasoning directed to the concrete situation and its practical meaning.

On this view, Schmitt’s analyses of decision, exception, and judgment—especially in Political Theology and Gesetz und Urteil—develop a form of reasoning that mediates between rule and case and cannot be reduced either to mechanical subsumption under general norms or to arbitrary decisionism. Herrera maintains that, while Derrida identifies a genuine tension in Schmitt’s thought between norm, decision, and singularity, his critique does not fully account for the non-technical character of juridical understanding in Schmitt’s work, and that Schmitt’s conception of juridical rationality aims to preserve openness to the exceptional and to the irreducibility of the other.

Derrida delivered a eulogy at Levinas' funeral, later published as Adieu à Emmanuel Lévinas, an appreciation and exploration of Levinas's moral philosophy. Derrida used Bracha L. Ettinger's interpretation of Lévinas' notion of femininity and transformed his own earlier reading of this subject respectively.

Derrida continued to produce readings of literature, writing extensively on Maurice Blanchot, Paul Celan, and others.

In 1991 he published The Other Heading, in which he discussed the concept of identity (as in cultural identity, European identity, and national identity), in the name of which in Europe have been unleashed "the worst violences," "the crimes of xenophobia, racism, anti-Semitism, religious or nationalist fanaticism."

At the 1997 Cerisy Conference, Derrida delivered a ten-hour address on the subject of "the autobiographical animal" entitled The Animal That Therefore I Am (More To Follow). Engaging with questions surrounding the ontology of nonhuman animals, the ethics of animal slaughter and the difference between humans and other animals, the address has been seen as initiating a late "animal turn" in Derrida's philosophy, although Derrida himself has said that his interest in animals is present in his earliest writings.

=== The Work of Mourning (1981–2001) ===
Beginning with "The Deaths of Roland Barthes" in 1981, Derrida produced a series of texts on mourning and memory occasioned by the loss of his friends and colleagues, many of them new engagements with their work. Memoires for Paul de Man, a book-length lecture series presented first at Yale and then at Irvine as Derrida's Wellek Lecture, followed in 1986, with a revision in 1989 that included "Like the Sound of the Sea Deep Within a Shell: Paul de Man's War". Ultimately, fourteen essays were collected into The Work of Mourning (2001), which was expanded in the 2003 French edition, Chaque fois unique, la fin du monde (literally, "Unique each time, the end of the world"), to include essays dedicated to Gérard Granel and Maurice Blanchot.

=== 2002 film ===
In October 2002, at the theatrical opening of the film Derrida, he said that, in many ways, he felt more and more close to Guy Debord's work, and that this closeness appears in Derrida's texts. Derrida mentioned, in particular, "everything I say about the media, technology, the spectacle, and the 'criticism of the show', so to speak, and the markets – the becoming-a-spectacle of everything, and the exploitation of the spectacle." Among the places in which Derrida mentions the Spectacle, is a 1997 interview about the notion of the intellectual.

== Politics ==
Derrida engaged with a variety of political issues, movements, and debates throughout his career. In 1968, he participated in the May 68 protests in France and met frequently with Maurice Blanchot. However, he expressed concerns about the "cult of spontaneity" and anti-unionist euphoria that he observed. He also registered his objections to the Vietnam War in a lecture he gave in the United States. Derrida signed a petition against age of consent laws in 1977, and in 1981 he founded the French Jan Hus association to support dissident Czech intellectuals.

In 1981, Derrida was arrested by the Czechoslovak government for leading a conference without authorization and charged with drug trafficking, although he claimed the drugs were planted on him. He was released with the help of the Mitterrand government and Michel Foucault. Derrida was an advocate for nuclear disarmament, protested against apartheid in South Africa, and met with Palestinian intellectuals during a visit to Jerusalem in 1988. He also opposed capital punishment and was involved in the campaign to free Mumia Abu-Jamal.

Although Derrida was not associated with any political party until 1995, he supported the Socialist candidacy of Lionel Jospin, despite misgivings about such organizations. In the 2002 French presidential election, he refused to vote in the run-off election between far-right candidate Jean-Marie Le Pen and center-right Jacques Chirac, citing a lack of acceptable choices. Derrida opposed the 2003 invasion of Iraq and was engaged in rethinking politics and the political itself within and beyond philosophy. He focused on understanding the political implications of notions such as responsibility, reason of state, decision, sovereignty, and democracy. By 2000, he was theorizing "democracy to come" and thinking about the limitations of existing democracies.

== Influences on Derrida ==
Crucial readings in his adolescence were Rousseau's Reveries of a Solitary Walker and Confessions, André Gide's journal, La porte étroite, Les nourritures terrestres and The Immoralist; and the works of Friedrich Nietzsche. The phrase Families, I hate you! in particular, which inspired Derrida as an adolescent, is a famous verse from Gide's Les nourritures terrestres, book IV. In a 1991 interview Derrida commented on a similar verse, also from book IV of the same Gide work: "I hated the homes, the families, all the places where man thinks he'll find rest" (Je haïssais les foyers, les familles, tous lieux où l'homme pense trouver un repos).

Other influences upon Derrida are Martin Heidegger, Plato, Søren Kierkegaard, Alexandre Kojève, Maurice Blanchot, Antonin Artaud, Roland Barthes, Georges Bataille, Edmund Husserl, Emmanuel Lévinas, Ferdinand de Saussure, Sigmund Freud, Karl Marx, Claude Lévi-Strauss, James Joyce, Samuel Beckett, J. L. Austin and Stéphane Mallarmé.

His book, Adieu à Emmanuel Lévinas, reveals his mentorship by this philosopher and Talmudic scholar who practiced the phenomenological encounter with the Other in the form of the Face, which commanded human response. The use of deconstruction to read Jewish texts – like the Talmud – is relatively rare but has recently been attempted.

== Peers and contemporaries ==
Derrida's philosophical friends, allies, students and the heirs of Derrida's thought include Paul de Man, Jean-François Lyotard, Louis Althusser, Emmanuel Levinas, Maurice Blanchot, Gilles Deleuze, Jean-Luc Nancy, Philippe Lacoue-Labarthe, Sarah Kofman, Hélène Cixous, Bernard Stiegler, Alexander García Düttmann, Joseph Cohen, Geoffrey Bennington, Jean-Luc Marion, Gayatri Chakravorty Spivak, Raphaël Zagury-Orly, Jacques Ehrmann, Avital Ronell, Judith Butler, Béatrice Galinon-Mélénec, Ernesto Laclau, Samuel Weber, Catherine Malabou, Michal Govrin and Claudette Sartiliot.

=== Nancy and Lacoue-Labarthe ===
Jean-Luc Nancy and Philippe Lacoue-Labarthe were among Derrida's first students in France and went on to become well-known and important philosophers in their own right. Despite their considerable differences of subject, and often also of a method, they continued their close interaction with each other and with Derrida, from the early 1970s.

Derrida wrote on both of them, including a long book on Nancy: Le Toucher, Jean-Luc Nancy (On Touching—Jean-Luc Nancy, 2005).

=== Paul de Man ===
Derrida's most prominent friendship in intellectual life was with Paul de Man, which began with their meeting at Johns Hopkins University and continued until de Man's death in 1983. De Man provided a somewhat different approach to deconstruction, and his readings of literary and philosophical texts were crucial in the training of a generation of readers.

Shortly after de Man's death, Derrida wrote the book Memoires: pour Paul de Man and in 1988 wrote an article in the journal Critical Inquiry called "Like the Sound of the Sea Deep Within a Shell: Paul de Man's War". The memoir became cause for controversy, because shortly before Derrida published his piece, it had been discovered by the Belgian literary critic Ortwin de Graef, at that time a graduate assistant at KU Leuven, that long before his academic career in the US, de Man had written almost two hundred essays in pro-Nazi newspapers during the German occupation of Belgium, including several that were explicitly antisemitic.

Critics of Derrida have argued that he minimizes the antisemitic character of de Man's writing. Some critics have found Derrida's treatment of this issue surprising, given that, for example, Derrida also spoke out against antisemitism and, in the 1960s, broke with the Heidegger disciple Jean Beaufret over Beaufret's instances of antisemitism, about which Derrida (and, after him, Maurice Blanchot) expressed shock.

=== Michel Foucault ===
Derrida's criticism of Foucault appears in the essay Cogito and the History of Madness (from Writing and Difference). It was first given as a lecture on 4 March 1963, at a conference at Wahl's Collège philosophique, which Foucault attended, and caused a rift between the two men that was never fully mended.

In an appendix added to the 1972 edition of his History of Madness, Foucault disputed Derrida's interpretation of his work, and accused Derrida of practicing "a historically well-determined little pedagogy [...] which teaches the student that there is nothing outside the text [...]. A pedagogy which inversely gives to the voice of the masters that infinite sovereignty that allows it indefinitely to re-say the text." According to historian Carlo Ginzburg, Foucault may have written The Order of Things (1966) and The Archaeology of Knowledge partly under the stimulus of Derrida's criticism. Carlo Ginzburg briefly labeled Derrida's criticism in Cogito and the History of Madness, as "facile, nihilistic objections," without giving further argumentation.

=== Derrida's translators ===
Geoffrey Bennington, Avital Ronell and Samuel Weber belong to a group of Derrida translators. Many of Derrida's translators are esteemed thinkers in their own right. Derrida often worked in a collaborative arrangement, allowing his prolific output to be translated into English in a timely fashion.

Having started as a student of de Man, Gayatri Spivak took on the translation of Of Grammatology early in her career and has since revised it into a second edition. Barbara Johnson's translation of Derrida's Dissemination was published by The Athlone Press in 1981. Alan Bass was responsible for several early translations; Bennington and Peggy Kamuf have continued to produce translations of his work for nearly twenty years. In recent years, a number of translations have appeared by Michael Naas (also a Derrida scholar) and Pascale-Anne Brault.

Bennington, Brault, Kamuf, Naas, Elizabeth Rottenberg, and David Wills are currently engaged in translating Derrida's previously unpublished seminars, which span from 1959 to 2003. Volumes I and II of The Beast and the Sovereign (presenting Derrida's seminars from 12 December 2001 to 27 March 2002 and from 11 December 2002 to 26 March 2003), as well as The Death Penalty, Volume I (covering 8 December 1999 to 22 March 2000), have appeared in English translation. Further volumes currently projected for the series include Heidegger: The Question of Being and History (1964–1965), Death Penalty, Volume II (2000–2001), Perjury and Pardon, Volume I (1997–1998), and Perjury and Pardon, Volume II (1998–1999).

With Bennington, Derrida undertook the challenge published as Jacques Derrida, an arrangement in which Bennington attempted to provide a systematic explication of Derrida's work (called the "Derridabase") using the top two-thirds of every page, while Derrida was given the finished copy of every Bennington chapter and the bottom third of every page in which to show how deconstruction exceeded Bennington's account (this was called the "Circumfession"). Derrida seems to have viewed Bennington in particular as a kind of rabbinical explicator, noting at the end of the "Applied Derrida" conference, held at the University of Luton in 1995 that: "everything has been said and, as usual, Geoff Bennington has said everything before I have even opened my mouth. I have the challenge of trying to be unpredictable after him, which is impossible... so I'll try to pretend to be unpredictable after Geoff. Once again."

=== Marshall McLuhan ===
Derrida was familiar with the work of Marshall McLuhan, and since his early 1967 writings (Of Grammatology, Speech and Phenomena), he speaks of language as a "medium," of phonetic writing as "the medium of the great metaphysical, scientific, technical, and economic adventure of the West."

He expressed his disagreement with McLuhan in regard to what he called McLuhan's ideology about the end of writing. In a 1982 interview, he said:

I think that there is an ideology in McLuhan's discourse that I don't agree with because he's an optimist as to the possibility of restoring an oral community which would get rid of the writing machines and so on. I think that's a very traditional myth which goes back to... let's say Plato, Rousseau... And instead of thinking that we are living at the end of writing, I think that in another sense we are living in the extension – the overwhelming extension – of writing. At least in the new sense... I don't mean the alphabetic writing down, but in the new sense of those writing machines that we're using now (e.g. the tape recorder). And this is writing too.

And in his 1972 essay Signature Event Context he said:

As writing, communication, if one insists upon maintaining the word, is not the means of transport of sense, the exchange of intentions and meanings, the discourse and "communication of consciousnesses." We are not witnessing an end of writing which, to follow McLuhan's ideological representation, would restore a transparency or immediacy of social relations; but indeed a more and more powerful historical unfolding of a general writing of which the system of speech, consciousness, meaning, presence, truth, etc., would only be an effect, to be analyzed as such. It is this questioned effect that I have elsewhere called logocentrism.

=== Architectural thinkers ===
Derrida had a direct impact on the theories and practices of influential architects Peter Eisenman and Bernard Tschumi towards the end of the twentieth century. Derrida impacted a project that was theorized by Eisenman in Chora L Works: Jacques Derrida and Peter Eisenman. This design was architecturally conceived by Tschumi for the Parc de la Villette in Paris, which included a sieve, or harp-like structure that Derrida envisaged as a physical metaphor for the receptacle-like properties of the khôra. Moreover, Derrida's commentaries on Plato's notion of khôra (χώρα) as set in the Timaeus (48e4) received later reflections in the philosophical works and architectural writings of the philosopher-architect Nader El-Bizri within the domain of phenomenology.

Derrida used "χώρα" to name a radical otherness that "gives place" for being. El-Bizri built on this by more narrowly taking khôra to name the radical happening of an ontological difference between being and beings. El-Bizri's reflections on khôra are taken as a basis for tackling the meditations on dwelling and on being and space in Heidegger's thought and the critical conceptions of space and place as they evolved in architectural theory (and its strands in phenomenological thinking), and in history of philosophy and science, with a focus on geometry and optics. This also describes El-Bizri's take on "econtology" as an extension of Heidegger's consideration of the question of being (Seinsfrage) by way of the fourfold (Das Geviert) of earth-sky-mortals-divinities (Erde und Himmel, Sterblichen und Göttlichen); and as also impacted by his own meditations on Derrida's take on "χώρα". Ecology is hence co-entangled with ontology, whereby the worldly existential analytics are grounded in earthiness, and environmentalism is orientated by ontological thinking Derrida argued that the subjectile is like Plato's khôra, Greek for space, receptacle or site. Plato proposes that khôra rests between the sensible and the intelligible, through which everything passes but in which nothing is retained. For example, an image needs to be held by something, just as a mirror will hold a reflection. For Derrida, khôra defies attempts at naming or the either/or logic, which he "deconstructed".

== Criticism ==
=== Criticism from Marxists ===
In a paper entitled Ghostwriting, Gayatri Chakravorty Spivak—the translator of Derrida's De la grammatologie (Of Grammatology) into English—criticised Derrida's understanding of Marx. Commenting on Derrida's Specters of Marx, Terry Eagleton wrote "The portentousness is ingrained in the very letter of this book, as one theatrically inflected rhetorical question tumbles hard on the heels of another in a tiresomely mannered syntax which lays itself wide open to parody."

=== Criticism from Anglophone philosophers ===
Though Derrida addressed the American Philosophical Association on at least one occasion in 1988, and was highly regarded by some contemporary philosophers like Richard Rorty, Alexander Nehamas, and Stanley Cavell, his work has been regarded by other analytic philosophers, such as John Searle and Willard Van Orman Quine, as pseudophilosophy or sophistry.

Some analytic philosophers have in fact claimed, since at least the 1980s, that Derrida's work is "not philosophy". One of the main arguments they gave was alleging that Derrida's influence had not been on US philosophy departments but on literature and other humanities disciplines.

In his 1989 Contingency, Irony, and Solidarity, Richard Rorty argues that Derrida (especially in his book, The Post Card: From Socrates to Freud and Beyond, one section of which is an experiment in fiction) purposefully uses words that cannot be defined (e.g., différance), and uses previously definable words in contexts diverse enough to make understanding impossible, so that the reader will never be able to contextualize Derrida's literary self. Rorty, however, argues that this intentional obfuscation is philosophically grounded. In garbling his message Derrida is attempting to escape the naïve, positive metaphysical projects of his predecessors.

Roger Scruton wrote in 2004, "He's difficult to summarise because it's nonsense. He argues that the meaning of a sign is never revealed in the sign but deferred indefinitely and that a sign only means something by virtue of its difference from something else. For Derrida, there is no such thing as meaning – it always eludes us and therefore anything goes."

On Derrida's scholarship and writing style, Noam Chomsky wrote "I found the scholarship appalling, based on pathetic misreading; and the argument, such as it was, failed to come close to the kinds of standards I've been familiar with since virtually childhood. Well, maybe I missed something: could be, but suspicions remain, as noted."

Paul R. Gross and Norman Levitt also criticized his work for misusing scientific terms and concepts in Higher Superstition: The Academic Left and Its Quarrels With Science (1994).

Three quarrels (or disputes) in particular went out of academic circles and received international mass media coverage: the 1972–88 quarrel with John Searle, the analytic philosophers' pressures on Cambridge University not to award Derrida an honorary degree, and a dispute with Richard Wolin and the NYRB.

==== Cambridge honorary doctorate ====
In 1992 some academics at Cambridge University, mostly not from the philosophy faculty, proposed that Derrida be awarded an honorary doctorate. This was opposed by, among others, the university's Professor of Philosophy Hugh Mellor. Eighteen other philosophers from US, Austrian, Australian, French, Polish, Italian, German, Dutch, Swiss, Spanish, and British institutions, including Barry Smith, Willard Van Orman Quine, David Armstrong, Ruth Barcan Marcus, and René Thom, then sent a letter to Cambridge claiming that Derrida's work "does not meet accepted standards of clarity and rigour" and describing Derrida's philosophy as being composed of "tricks and gimmicks similar to those of the Dadaists". The letter concluded that:

... where coherent assertions are being made at all, these are either false or trivial. Academic status based on what seems to us to be little more than semi-intelligible attacks upon the values of reason, truth, and scholarship is not, we submit, sufficient grounds for the awarding of an honorary degree in a distinguished university.

In the end the protesters were outnumbered—336 votes to 204—when Cambridge put the motion to a formal ballot; though almost all of those who proposed Derrida and who voted in favour were not from the philosophy faculty. Hugh Mellor continued to find the award undeserved, explaining: "He is a mediocre, unoriginal philosopher — he is not even interestingly bad".

Derrida suggested in an interview that part of the reason for the attacks on his work was that it questioned and modified "the rules of the dominant discourse, it tries to politicize and democratize education and the university scene". To answer a question about the "exceptional violence", the compulsive "ferocity", and the "exaggeration" of the "attacks", he would say that these critics organize and practice in his case "a sort of obsessive personality cult that philosophers should know how to question and above all to moderate".

==== Dispute with Richard Wolin and the NYRB ====
Richard Wolin has argued since 1991 that Derrida's work, as well as that of Derrida's major inspirations (e.g., Bataille, Blanchot, Levinas, Heidegger, Nietzsche), leads to a corrosive nihilism. For example, Wolin argues that the "deconstructive gesture of overturning and reinscription ends up by threatening to efface many of the essential differences between Nazism and non-Nazism".

In 1991, when Wolin published a Derrida interview on Heidegger in the first edition of The Heidegger Controversy, Derrida argued that the interview was an intentionally malicious mistranslation, which was "demonstrably execrable" and "weak, simplistic, and compulsively aggressive". As French law requires the consent of an author to translations and this consent was not given, Derrida insisted that the interview not appear in any subsequent editions or reprints. Columbia University Press subsequently refused to offer reprints or new editions. Later editions of The Heidegger Controversy by MIT Press also omitted the Derrida interview. The matter achieved public exposure owing to a friendly review of Wolin's book by the Heideggerian scholar Thomas Sheehan that appeared in The New York Review of Books, in which Sheehan characterised Derrida's protests as an imposition of censorship. It was followed by an exchange of letters. Derrida in turn responded to Sheehan and Wolin, in "The Work of Intellectuals and the Press (The Bad Example: How the New York Review of Books and Company do Business)", which was published in the book Points....

Twenty-four academics, belonging to different schools and groups – often in disagreement with each other and with deconstruction – signed a letter addressed to The New York Review of Books, in which they expressed their indignation for the magazine's behaviour as well as that of Sheenan and Wolin.

=== Criticism from other philosophers ===
Among philosophers engaging with post-Kantian debates on subjectivity, the Chilean philosopher Hugo E. Herrera has argued that while Derrida’s notion of différance explains the distance required for consciousness, an equally original principle of unity must also be presupposed in order to account for self-identification and the unification of meaningful contexts.

==== Critical obituaries ====
Critical obituaries of Derrida were published in The New York Times, The Economist, and The Independent. The Times's was titled "Jacques Derrida, Abstruse Theorist, Dies in Paris at 74". The magazine The Nation responded to the Times by saying that "even though American papers had scorned and trivialized Derrida before, the tone seemed particularly caustic". A second obituary by deconstruction scholar and Derrida's friend Mark C. Taylor was published by the Times a few days after the first one.

== See also ==
- Gadamer–Derrida debate
- Difference (poststructuralism)

== Works cited ==
- Geoffrey Bennington (1991). Jacques Derrida, University of Chicago Press. Section Curriculum vitae, pp. 325–36. Excerpts. ISBN 9780226042626
- Caputo, John D. (ed.) (1997). Deconstruction in a Nutshell: A Conversation with Jacques Derrida. New York: Fordham University Press. Transcript (which is also available) of the Roundtable Discussion with Jacques Derrida at Villanova University, 3 October 1994. With commentary by Caputo.
- Cixous, Hélène (2001). Portrait of Jacques Derrida as a Young Jewish Saint (English edition, New York: Columbia University Press, 2004). OCLC 1025139739, 265430083, 448343513, 1036830179
- Dal Bo, Federico Deconstructing the Talmud Routledge 2019. ISBN 978-1138208223
- Derrida (1967): interview with Henri Ronse, republished in Positions (English edition, Chicago & London: University of Chicago Press, 1981).
- Derrida (1971): interview with Guy Scarpetta, republished in Positions (English edition, Chicago & London: University of Chicago Press, 1981).
- Derrida (1976). Where a Teaching Body Begins and How It Ends, republished in Who's Afraid of Philosophy?.
- Derrida (1988). Afterword: Toward An Ethic of Discussion, published in the English translation of Limited Inc.
- Derrida (1989). This Strange Institution Called Literature, interview published in Acts of Literature (1991), pp. 33–75
- Derrida (1990). Once Again from the Top: Of the Right to Philosophy, interview with Robert Maggiori for Libération, 15 November 1990, republished in Points...: Interviews, 1974–1994 (1995).
- Derrida (1991). "A 'Madness' Must Watch Over Thinking", interview with Francois Ewald for Le Magazine Litteraire, March 1991, republished in Points...: Interviews, 1974–1994 (1995).
- Derrida (1992). Derrida's interview in The Cambridge Review 113, October 1992. Reprinted in Points...: Interviews, 1974–1994 Stanford University Press (1995) and retitled as Honoris Causa: "This is also extremely funny," pp. 399–421. Excerpt.
- Derrida (1993). Specters of Marx.
- Derrida et al. (1994): "Des humanités et de la discipline philosophique"/"Of the Humanities and Philosophical Disciplines" (Roundtable Discussion). Archived from the original on 25 October 2019. Surfaces Vol. VI.108 (v.1.0A – 16 August 1996) – ISSN 1188-2492. Jacques Derrida's contribution to the first International Conference for Humanistic Discourses, was held in April, 1994. Later republished in Ethics, Institutions, and the Right to Philosophy (2002).
- Derrida and Ferraris (1997). "I Have a Taste for Secret", 1993–1995 conversations with Maurizio Ferraris and Giorgio Vattimo, in Derrida and Ferraris (2001) A Taste for the Secret, translated by Giacomo Donis.
- Derrida (1997): interview Les Intellectuels: tentative de définition par eux-mêmes. Enquête, published in a special number of journal Lignes, 32 (1997): 57–68, republished in Papier Machine (2001), and translated into English as Intellectuals. Attempt at Definition by Themselves. Survey, in Derrida (2005) Paper machine.
- Derrida (2002): Q&A session at Film Forum, New York City, 23 October 2002, transcript by Gil Kofman. Published in Kirby Dick, Amy Ziering Kofman, Jacques Derrida (2005). Derrida: screenplay and essays on the film.
- Graff, Gerald (1993). Is Reason in Trouble? in Proc. Am. Philos. Soc., 137, no. 4, 1993, pp. 680–88.
- Kritzman, Lawrence (2005). The Columbia History of Twentieth-Century French Thought, Columbia University Press.
- Mackey, Louis (1984) with a reply by Searle. An Exchange on Deconstruction, in New York Review of Books, 2 February 1984.
- El-Bizri, Nader, "Qui-êtes vous Khôra?: Receiving Plato's Timaeus", Existentia Meletai-Sophias 11 (2001), pp. 473–490.
- El-Bizri, Nader, "ON KAI KHORA: Situating Heidegger between the Sophist and the Timaeus," Studia Phaenomenologica 4 (2004), pp. 73–98.
- Peeters, Benoît (2013). Derrida: A Biography. Translated by Andrew Brown. Cambridge: Polity Press. ISBN 978-0-7456-6302-9 OCLC 980688411, 844437566, 818721033
- Powell, Jason (2006). Jacques Derrida: A Biography. London and New York: Continuum.
- Poster, Mark (1988). Critical theory and poststructuralism: in search of a context, section Introduction: Theory and the problem of Context.
- Poster, Mark (2010). McLuhan and the Cultural Theory of Media, MediaTropes eJournal, Vol. II, No. 2 (2010): 1–18.
- Searle (1983). The Word Turned Upside Down, in The New York Review of Books, October 1983.
- Searle (2000). Reality Principles: An Interview with John R. Searle. Reason.com. February 2000 issue. Retrieved 30 August 2010.
