= Geoffrey Bennington =

British philosopher (born 1956)

Geoffrey Bennington (born 1956) is Asa Griggs Candler Professor of French and Professor of Comparative Literature at Emory University in Georgia, United States, and Professor of Philosophy at the European Graduate School in Saas-Fee, Switzerland, as well as a member of the International College of Philosophy in Paris. He is a literary critic and philosopher, best known as an expert on deconstruction and the works of Jacques Derrida and Jean-François Lyotard. Bennington has translated many of Derrida's works into English.

== Education ==
Bennington received his B.A., M.A., and D.Phil. from Oxford University.

== Teaching positions ==
He took up a teaching appointment at the University of Sussex at Brighton, where he created an M.A. program in Modern French Thought and twice served as chair of the French department. Since arriving at Emory in 2001, he has chaired both the French and the Comparative Literature Departments.

== Publications ==
He co-wrote the book Jacques Derrida with Derrida. Bennington's contribution, "Derridabase", is an attempt to provide a comprehensive explication of Derrida's work. "Derridabase" appears on the upper two-thirds of the book's pages, while Derrida's contribution, "Circumfession", is written on the lower third of each page. Derrida's "Circumfession" is, among other things, intended to show how Derrida's work exceeds Bennington's explication: by introducing details about his own circumcision and its possible meanings Derrida shows the impossibility of such a regulated database of his writings. Many of Bennington's essays on Derrida collected in Legislations, Interrupting Derrida, and Not Half No End, have criticized explanations of Derrida's work attempted by other scholars. Bennington has also written two monographs on Lyotard, Writing the Event and Late Lyotard, and has also written extensively on Rousseau and Kant, developing original accounts of the "paradox of the legislator" in the former and "interrupted teleology" in the latter. He is currently writing a deconstructive account of political philosophy.

He has translated a number of works by Derrida and others, and is General Editor (with Peggy Kamuf) of the English translations of Derrida's posthumously published seminars.

He has at times tried to engage members of the British press hostile to Derrida's work and has also attempted to explicate the relationship between deconstruction and analytic philosophy, which has generally had difficulties receiving work by Derrida and others.

== Works ==
=== Books ===
- Bennington, Geoffrey; Attridge, Derek; Young, Robert (1983). Post-structuralism and the Question of History, (ISBN 0-521-36780-8) (ed.)
- Bennington, Geoffrey [1985] (2005). Sententiousness and the Novel: Laying Down the Law in Eighteenth-Century French Fiction, (ISBN 0-521-30246-3), reprinted as ebook,
- Bennington, Geoffrey [1988] (2005). Lyotard: Writing the Event, (ISBN 0-521-30246-3) reprinted as ebook,
- Bennington, Geoffrey (1991). Jacques Derrida, (ISBN 0-226-04262-6), w/ Jacques Derrida
- Bennington, Geoffrey (1991). Dudding: des noms de Rousseau, (ISBN 2-7186-0389-5)
- Bennington, Geoffrey (1995). Legislations: the Politics of Deconstruction, (ISBN 0-86091-668-5)
- Bennington, Geoffrey (2000). Interrupting Derrida, (ISBN 0-415-22427-6)
- Bennington, Geoffrey (2000). Frontières kantiennes, (ISBN 2-7186-0523-5)
- Bennington, Geoffrey (2003). Frontiers: Kant, Hegel, Frege, Wittgenstein,
- Bennington, Geoffrey (2005). Other Analyses: Reading Philosophy,
- Bennington, Geoffrey (2005). Open Book/Livre Ouvert,
- Bennington, Geoffrey (2005). Deconstruction is Not What You Think...,
- Bennington, Geoffrey (2005). Late Lyotard,
- Bennington, Geoffrey (2010). Not Half No End: Militantly Melancholic Essays in Memory of Jacques Derrida, (ISBN 9780748639854)
- Bennington, Geoffrey (2011). Géographie et autres lectures, (ISBN 9782705680206)
- Bennington, Geoffrey (2016). Scatter I: The Politics of Politics in Foucault, Heidegger, and Derrida, (ISBN 9780823270538)
- Bennington, Geoffrey (2017). Kant on the Frontier: Philosophy, Politics, and the Ends of the Earth, (ISBN 9780823275984)
- Bennington, Geoffrey (2021, Scatter 2: Politics in Deconstruction (ISBN 9780823289936)

=== Journal articles ===
- Bennington, Geoffrey (December 2011). "Kant's open secret". Theory, Culture & Society. 28 (7–8): 26–40. doi:10.1177/0263276411423036. S2CID 143513241.

== Translations ==
- Heidegger: The Question of Being and History (ISBN 9780226355115) Jacques Derrida, 2016
- The Beast and the Sovereign, II (ISBN 9780226144306) Jacques Derrida, 2011
- The Beast and the Sovereign, I (ISBN 9780226144283) Jacques Derrida, 2009
- Veils, (ISBN 0-8047-3795-9) Jacques Derrida and Hélène Cixous, 2001
- Jacques Derrida, (ISBN 0-226-04262-6) Jacques Derrida and Geoffrey Bennington, 1993
- The Inhuman: Talks on Time, (ISBN 0-8047-2008-8) Jean-François Lyotard, 1991, w/ Rachel Bowlby
- Virginia Woolf and the Madness of Language, (ISBN 0-415-03194-X) Daniel Ferrer, 1990, w/ Rachel Bowlby
- Of Spirit: Heidegger and the Question, (ISBN 0-226-14319-8) Jacques Derrida, 1989, w/ Rachel Bowlby
- The Truth in Painting, (ISBN 0-226-14324-4) Jacques Derrida, 1987, w/ Ian McLeod
- The Postmodern Condition, (UK ISBN 0-7190-1450-6) (US ISBN 0-8166-1173-4) Jean-François Lyotard, 1984, w/ Brian Massumi

== See also ==
- List of thinkers influenced by deconstruction
