= Writing and Difference =

1967 book by Jacques Derrida

- Cover of the first edition
- Author: Jacques Derrida
- Original title: L'écriture et la différence
- Translator: Alan Bass
- Language: French
- Subject: Philosophy
- Publisher: Éditions du Seuil
- Publication date: 1967
- Publication place: France
- English publication date: 1978
- Media type: Print
- Pages: 446 (English translation)
- ISBN: 0-415-25383-7

Writing and Difference (French: L'écriture et la différence) is a book by the French philosopher Jacques Derrida. The work, which collects some of the early lectures and essays that established his fame, was published in 1967 alongside Of Grammatology and Speech and Phenomena.

== Summary ==
=== Cogito and the History of Madness ===
The collection contains the essay Cogito and the History of Madness, a critique of Michel Foucault. It was first given as a lecture on March 4, 1963, at a conference at the Collège philosophique, which Foucault attended, and caused a rift between the two, possibly prompting Foucault to write The Order of Things (1966) and The Archaeology of Knowledge (1969).

=== Violence and Metaphysics ===
In "Violence and Metaphysics," Derrida comments on the writings of Emmanuel Levinas. He honors Levinas for his ethical philosophy of openness to the Other. Indeed, he goes along with the idea that to live for the Other is the highest good. But he challenges the idea that only face-to-face interaction can be ethical. Whereas Levinas sees written communication as dead and unresponsive, Derrida argues that writing can be just as valuable a space for ethical encounter. He writes, in characteristic support for writing: "Is it not possible to invert all of Levinas’s statements on this point? By showing, for example, that writing can assist itself, for it has time and freedom, escaping better than speech from empirical urgencies."

=== The Structuralist Controversy ===
Included in the collection is his 1966 lecture at Johns Hopkins University, which changed the course of the conference leading it to be renamed The Structuralist Controversy, and caused Derrida to receive his first major attention outside France. The lecture is titled Structure, Sign, and Play in the Discourse of the Human Sciences.
