= Intrapreneurial bricolage =

Intrapreneurial bricolage (IB) is the pursuit of entrepreneurial endeavors, operating within a larger organization using only limited, available resources. The term combines the two concepts of intrapreneurship and bricolage. Intrapreneurship uses principles and strategies from the discipline of entrepreneurship and applies them within the confines of an organization rather than initiating new ones. Borrowed from the French word for "makeshift job", bricolage is a type of art using whatever media is at hand. In the context of intrapreneurial bricolage, intrapreneurs find innovative ways to work with a scarcity of resources.

== Background ==
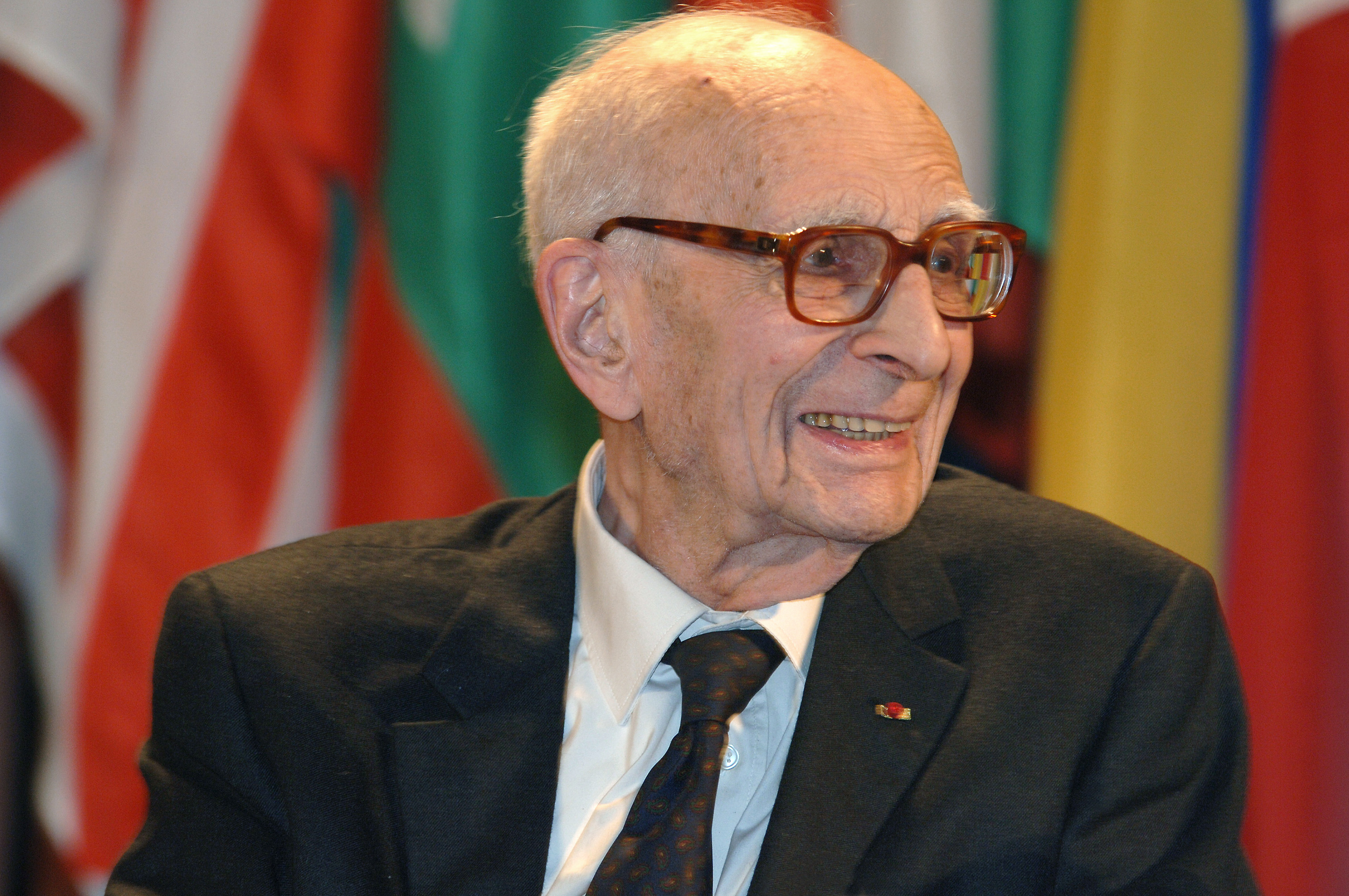
French anthropologist Claude Lévi-Strauss

In The Savage Mind, French anthropologist Claude Lévi-Strauss discussed 'bricolage' as having roots in the French idea of a worker who uses his hands inventively to accomplish what other workers cannot. In his description of this jack-of-all-trades, Lévi-Strauss explains that there is no requirement for skills and tools to be highly specialized. Instead, this 'bricoleur' is flexible enough to be able to use minimal resources for multiple applications.

== Hidden assets ==
One of the key principles of IB is finding utility in resources commonly overlooked. These resources can be divided into tangible and intangible assets. Often these assets are overlooked because they are obscured, dispersed or underutilized. Some examples of hidden assets include:

- Personal knowledge or skills
- Networking
- Germinal financing
- Information technology
