= The Naked Man =

The Naked Man may refer to:

- The Naked Man (Mythologiques), a volume from the Mythologiques work of cultural anthropology by Claude Lévi-Strauss
- The Naked Man: A Study of the Male Body, a book by the anthropologist Desmond Morris
- The Naked Man (1923 film), a British film
- The Naked Man (1998 film), a comedy film
- "The Naked Man" (How I Met Your Mother), a 2008 episode of the television show How I Met Your Mother
- Well Hung Lover, a.k.a. Naked Man, a mural by Banksy
- Naked man orchid, Orchis italica

== See also ==
- Andrew Martinez, a.k.a. "Naked Guy"
- Naked fugitive, an unidentified young man briefly mentioned in the Gospel of Mark
