= J. P. B. de Josselin de Jong =

Dutch anthropologist

J.P.B. de Josselin de Jong
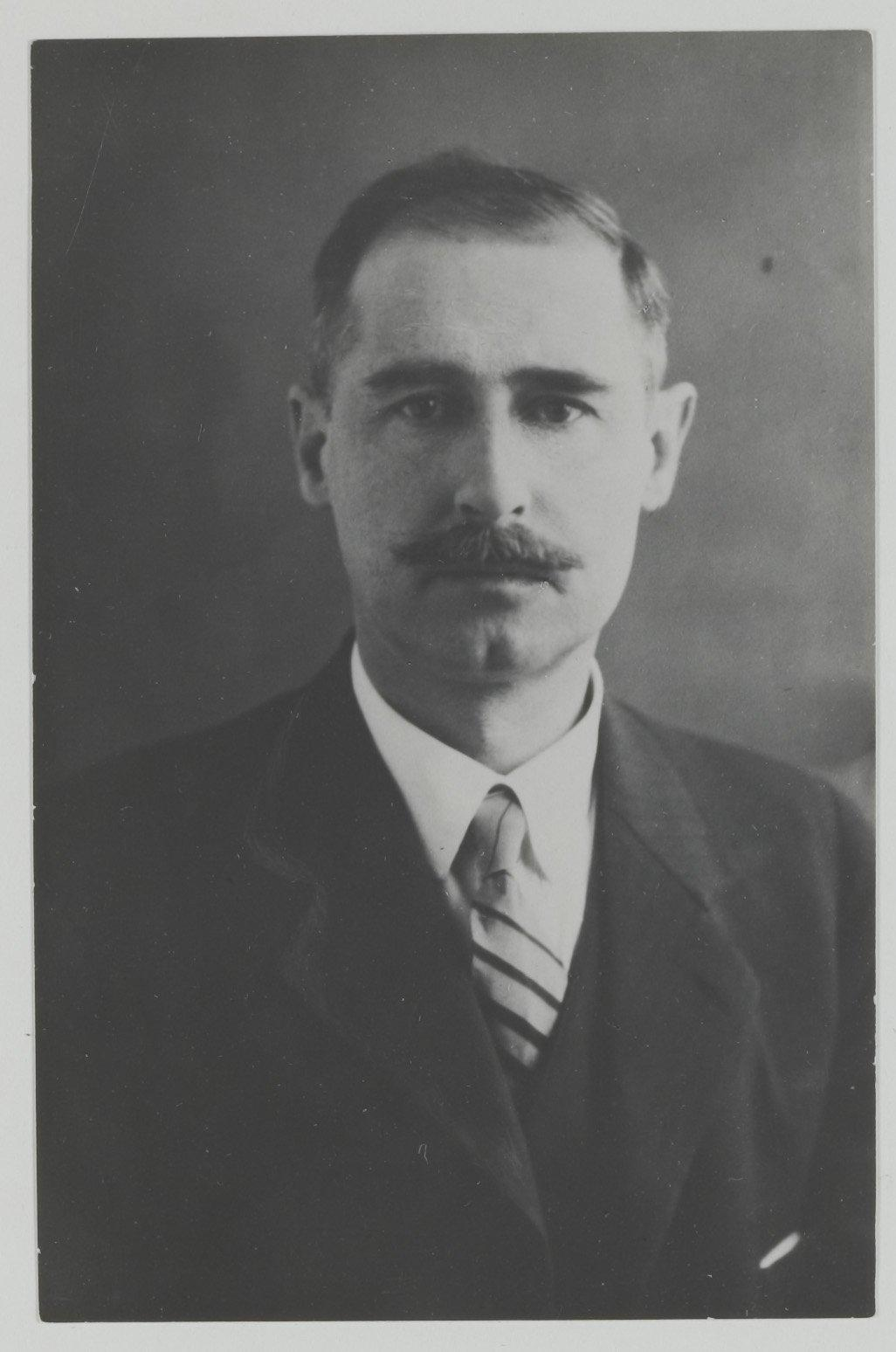
- J. P. B. de Josselin de Jong (1932)
- Born: 13 March 1886; Leiden
- Died: 15 November 1964 (aged 78); Zeist
- Known for: founding modern Dutch anthropology and Dutch structural anthropology

Jan Petrus Benjamin de Josselin de Jong (13 March 1886 – 15 November 1964) was a founding father of modern Dutch anthropology and of structural anthropology at Leiden University.

== Biography ==
In his early career, he was a museum curator. His area of specialty was American and Indonesian ethnography. He held two anthropology chairs at Leiden University, the first a chair in general ethnology (1922–1935); the second a chair in general ethnology and Indonesian ethnography (1935–1956). His nephew, Patrick Edward de Josselin de Jong succeeded him on the second chair in 1957.

In 1921, he became a member of the Royal Netherlands Academy of Arts and Sciences. In 1928, he held an important lecture on "The Natchez Social System' in New York City and in Leiden, his students founded the Ethnological Debating Society W.D.O.

In 1952, he gave a commentary on Claude Lévi-Strauss's theory of kinship and highlighted the significance of double descent or bilinealism in explaining some of the features of affinal arrangements which Dutch ethnologists had previously researched in Indonesian related subjects.

Jan Petrus Benjamin de Josselin de Jong, after an industrious career as Professor of Cultural Anthropology in the Leiden University, retired in 1956. He died in 1964.

== Career ==
Jan Petrus Benjamin de Josselin de Jong was Professor of Cultural Anthropology at the Leiden University. His work at the university covered the second phase of the study in the Leiden University from 1920 onwards; the first phase involved P.J. Veth, G.A. Wilken, J.J.M. de Groot, and A.W. Nieuwenhuis. While the first phase was influenced by cultural geography and social evolutionism, the second phase was influenced by the work of Émile Durkheim and Marcel Mauss, as well as of Franz Boas and R.H. Lowie.

The Leiden tradition was set by J. P. B. in his second inaugural lecture (1935) with the concept of Ethnological Field of Study; its focus being the structural core of Indonesian societies. According to him, four elements constitute this structural core: circulating connubium, double unilineality, dual symbolic classification, and resilience from foreign cultural influences.

A new chair in general ethnology was established in J. P. B.'s name in the university in 1922 and a newly set up doctorate was awarded to his friend and former colleague W.H. Rassers, with whom he co-operated as Curator in the 1920s at the National Museum of Ethnology.

In 1929, he had proposed establishment of two chairs in the University, one regional and one general chair in view of his experience on the subject of general ethnology in Indonesia which was partially implemented.

In 1949, he started a seminar on the subject of "the structural analysis systems of kinship and marriage", under urging by his nephew Patrick who found the book "Les structures élémentaires de la parenté" by Claude Lévi-Strauss (1949). This influence was strongly reflected in a booklet he published titled "Lévi-Strauss' Theory on Kinship and Marriage", which was both an appreciation and a critique of Lévi-Strauss' approach to the subject. Lévi-Strauss thanked J.P.B for his "thorough and honest review."

During his long career span, he supervised 21 doctoral theses. One of these was the doctoral thesis of his nephew, Patrick Edward de Josselin de Jong, on the subject of Minangkabau and Negi Sembilan: Socio-Political Structure in Indonesia which was defended by the author on December 19, 1951. Another was the thesis of Jan Pouwer, Some aspects of Mimika Culture, Netherlands South-West New Guinea (1955, in Dutch), based on fieldwork in Southwest Papua, which led to a career as professor at the universities of Amsterdam, Wellington, and Nijmegen.

J. P. B. retired in March 1956 at the age of 70 and on this occasion his brother's son, Patrick de Josselin de Jong, published an article on "De visie der participanten op hun cultuur (1956)" in his uncle's Festschrift (English translation titled The Participants View on their Culture was also published later in 1967). Following this, P.E. de Josselin de Jong was appointed as professor to succeed his uncle.

In 1965, four In memoriams were published, including one by P.E. de Josselin de Jong, highlighting J. P. B.'s contributions to linguistics.
