= Structural anthropology =

Concept in anthropology by Lévi-Strauss

Structural anthropology is a school of sociocultural anthropology based on Claude Lévi-Strauss' 1949 idea that immutable deep structures exist in all cultures, and consequently, that all cultural practices have homologous counterparts in other cultures, essentially that all cultures are equatable.

Lévi-Strauss' approach arose in large part from dialectics expounded on by Marx and Hegel, though dialectics (as a concept) dates back to Ancient Greek philosophy. Hegel explains that every situation presents two opposing things and their resolution; Fichte had termed these "thesis, antithesis, and synthesis." Lévi-Strauss argued that cultures also have this structure. He showed, for example, how opposing ideas would fight and were resolved to establish the rules of marriage, mythology and ritual. This approach, he felt, made for fresh new ideas. He stated:

people think about the world in terms of binary opposites—such as high and low, inside and outside, person and animal, life and death—and that every culture can be understood in terms of these opposites. "From the very start," he wrote, "the process of visual perception makes use of binary oppositions."

Only those who practice structural analysis are aware of what they are actually trying to do: that is, to reunite perspectives that the "narrow" scientific outlook of recent centuries believed to be mutually exclusive: sensibility and intellect, quality and quantity, the concrete and the geometrical, or as we say today, the "etic" and the "emic."

In South America he showed that there are "dual organizations" throughout Amazon rainforest cultures, and that these "dual organizations" represent opposites and their synthesis. As an illustration, Gê tribes of the Amazon were found to divide their villages into two rival halves; however, members from each half married each other, resolving the opposition.

Culture, he claimed, has to take into account both life and death and needs to have a way of mediating between the two. Mythology (see his several-volume Mythologies) unites opposites in diverse ways.

Three of the most prominent structural anthropologists are Lévi-Strauss himself and the British neo-structuralists Rodney Needham and Edmund Leach. The latter was the author of such essays as "Time and False Noses" (in Rethinking Anthropology).

== Influences ==
Lévi-Strauss took many ideas from structural linguistics, including those of Ferdinand de Saussure, Roman Jakobson, Émile Durkheim and Marcel Mauss. Saussure argued that linguists needed to move beyond the recording of parole (individual speech acts) and come to an understanding of langue, the grammar of each language.

Lévi-Strauss applied this distinction in his search for mental structures that underlie all acts of human behavior: Just as speakers can talk without awareness of grammar, he argued, humans are unaware of the workings of social structures in daily life. The structures that form the "deep grammar" of society originate in the mind and operate unconsciously (albeit not in a Freudian sense).

Another concept was borrowed from the Prague school of linguistics, which employed so-called binary oppositions in their research. Roman Jakobson and others analysed sounds based on the presence or absence of certain features, such as "voiceless" vs. "voiced." Lévi-Strauss included this in his conceptualization of the mind's universal structures. For him, opposites formed the basis of social structure and culture.

== Kinship ==
In his early work Lévi-Strauss argued that tribal kinship groups were usually found in pairs, or in paired groups that oppose each other yet need one another. For example, in the Amazon basin, two extended families would build their houses in two facing semicircles that together form a big circle. He showed too that the ways people initially categorized animals, trees, and other natural features, were based on a series of oppositions.

In his most popular work, The Raw and the Cooked, he described folk tales of tribal South America as related to one another through a series of transformations—as one opposite in tales here changed into its opposite in tales there. For example, as the title implies, raw becomes its opposite cooked. These particular opposites (raw/cooked) are symbolic of human culture itself, in which by means of thought and labour (economics), raw materials become clothes, food, weapons, art and ideas.

While Durkheim thought that taxonomies of the natural world are collective in origin (the "collective conscious"), meaning that social structures influence individual cognitive structures, Lévi-Strauss proposed the opposite, arguing that it is the latter that gives rise to the former. Social structures mirror cognitive structures, meaning that patterns in social interaction can be treated as their manifestations. While structural-functionalists looked for structures within social organisation, structuralism seeks to identify links between structures of thought and social structures. Possibly the most significant influence on structuralism came from Mauss' The Gift. Mauss argued that gifts are not free, but rather oblige the recipient to reciprocate. Through the gift, the givers give part of themselves, imbuing the gift a certain power that compels a response. Gift exchanges, therefore play a crucial role in creating and maintaining social relationships by establishing bonds of obligations. Gifts are not merely physical, incidental objects; they possess cultural and spiritual properties. It is a "total prestation" as Mauss called it, as it carries the power to create a system of reciprocity in which the honour of both giver and recipient are engaged. Social relationships are therefore based on exchange; Durkheimian solidarity, according to Mauss, is best achieved through structures of reciprocity and related systems of exchange.

Lévi-Strauss took this idea and postulated three fundamental properties of the human mind: a) people follow rules; b) reciprocity is the simplest way to create social relationships; c) a gift binds both giver and recipient in a continuing social relationship.

Structures are universal; their realization is culturally specific. Lévi-Strauss argued that exchange is the universal basis of kinship systems, the structures of which depend on the type of marriage rules that apply. Because of its strong focus on vertical social relations, Lévi-Strauss' model of kinship systems came to be called alliance theory.

== Marriage ==
Lévi-Strauss' model attempted to offer a single explanation for cross-cousin marriage, sister-exchange, dual organization and rules of exogamy. Over time, marriage rules create social structures because marriages are primarily forged between groups and not just between spouses. When groups exchange women on a regular basis, they marry together; consequently, each marriage creates a debtor/creditor relationship that must be balanced through the "repayment" of wives, either immediately or in the next generation.

Lévi-Strauss proposed that the initial motivation for the exchange of women was the incest taboo. He deemed this the beginning and essence of culture, as it was the first prohibition to check natural impulses; secondarily, it divides labor by gender. Prescribing exogamy creates a distinction between marriageable and tabooed women that necessitates a search for women outside one's own kin group ("marry out or die out") and fosters exchange relationships with other groups. Exogamy promotes inter-group alliances and forms structures of social networks.

Lévi-Strauss also discovered that a wide range of historically unrelated cultures had the rule that individuals should marry their cross-cousin, meaning children of siblings of the opposite sex—from a male perspective that is either the FZD (father's sister's daughter) or the MBD (mother's brother's daughter). Accordingly, he grouped all possible kinship systems into a scheme containing three basic kinship structures constructed out of two types of exchange. He called the three kinship structures elementary, semi-complex and complex.

Elementary structures are based on positive marriage rules that specify whom a person must marry, while complex systems specify negative marriage rules (whom one must not marry), thus leaving room for choice based on preference. Elementary structures can operate based on two forms of exchange: restricted (or direct) exchange, a symmetric form of exchange between two groups (also called moieties) of wife-givers and wife-takers; in an initial restricted exchange FZ marries MB, with all children then being bilateral cross-cousins (the daughter is both MBD and FZD). Continued restricted exchange means that the two lineages marry together. Restricted exchange structures are generally uncommon.

The second form of exchange within elementary structures is called generalised exchange, meaning that a man can only marry either his MBD (matrilateral cross-cousin marriage) or his FZD (patrilateral cross-cousin marriage). This involves an asymmetric exchange between at least three groups. Matrilateral cross-cousin marriage arrangements where the marriage of the parents is repeated by successive generations are very common in parts of Asia (e.g. amongst the Kachin). Lévi-Strauss considered generalised exchange to be superior to restricted exchange because it allows the integration of indefinite numbers of groups. Examples of restricted exchange are found, for instance, in the Amazon basin. These tribal societies are made up of multiple moieties that often split up, rendering them comparatively unstable. Generalised exchange is more integrative but contains an implicit hierarchy, as e.g. amongst the Kachin where wife-givers are superior to wife-takers. Consequently, the last wife-taking group in the chain is significantly inferior to the first wife-giving group to which it is supposed to give its wives. These status inequalities can destabilise the entire system or can at least lead to an accumulation of wives (and in the case of the Kachin, also of bridewealth) at one end of the chain.

From a structural perspective matrilateral cross-cousin marriage is superior to its patrilateral counterpart; the latter has less potential to produce social cohesion since its exchange cycles are shorter (the direction of wife exchange is reversed in each successive generation). Lévi-Strauss' theory is supported by fact that patrilateral cross-cousin marriage is in fact the rarest of three types. However, matrilateral generalised exchange poses a risk as group A depends on receiving a woman from a group that it has not itself given a woman to, producing a less immediate obligation to reciprocate compared to a restricted exchange system. The risk created by such a delayed return is obviously lowest in restricted exchange systems.

Lévi-Strauss proposed a third structure between elementary and complex structures, called semi-complex structure or Crow-Omaha system. Semi-complex structures contain so many negative marriage rules that they effectively prescribe marriage to specific parties, thus somewhat resembling elementary structures. These structures are found, for example, among the Crow Nation and Omaha Native Americans in the United States.

In Lévi-Strauss' view, the basic building block of kinship is not just the nuclear family, as in structural-functionalism, but the so-called kinship atom: the nuclear family together with the wife's brother. This "mother's brother" (from the perspective of the wife-seeking son) plays a crucial role in alliance theory, as he is the one who ultimately decides whom his daughter will marry. Moreover, it is not just the nuclear family as such, but alliances between families that matter in regard to the creation of social structures, reflecting the typical structuralist argument that the position of an element in the structure is more significant than the element itself. Descent theory and alliance theory therefore look at two sides of one coin: the former emphasising bonds of consanguinity (kinship by blood), the latter stressing bonds of affinity (kinship by law or choice).

== The Leiden school ==
Much earlier, and some 450 miles north of Paris, a specific type of applied anthropology emerged at Leiden University, Netherlands that focused frequently on the relationship between apparent cultural phenomena found in the Indonesian archipelago: Batak, Minangkabau, Moluccas, etc., though it was primarily aimed at training governors for colonial Indonesia. This type of anthropology, developed by late nineteenth-century and early twentieth-century scholars, was eventually called "de Leidse Richting," or "de Leidse School."

Multiple researchers were educated in this school. This theory attracted students and researchers interested in a holistic approach, that was broad and deep, that related economic circumstances with mythological and spatial classifications and that explored the relationship between the natural world and religious, symbolic systems. This was long before structuralism. The "Leiden" perspective drove research for many decades, influencing successive generations of anthropologists.

The most recent chairs were held by J. P. B. de Josselin de Jong (chair: 1922–1956, 1964), who coined the concept of the Field of Ethnological Study in 1935, and later his nephew P. E. de Josselin de Jong (chair: 1956–1987, 1999).

== British neo-structuralism ==
The British brand of structuralism was mainly espoused by Rodney Needham and Edmund Leach, who were both critical towards the structural-functionalist perspective and who drew on Lévi-Strauss as well as Arthur Maurice Hocart. They also found grounds for critiquing Lévi-Strauss. Leach was more concerned with researching people's actual lives than with the discovery of universal mental structures.

He found that the latter's analysis of the Kachin contained serious flaws. According to Leach, Lévi-Strauss' project had been overly ambitious, meaning that his analyses were too superficial and the available data treated with too little care. While part of his analysis of the Kachin was simply based on incorrect ethnographic information, the rest reflected Kachin ideology but not actual practice.

In theory, Kachin groups were supposed to marry in a circle ideally consisting of five groups. In reality, the system was strongly unbalanced with built-in status differences between wife-givers and wife-takers. Lévi-Strauss had incorrectly assumed that wife-takers would be of higher rank than wife-givers; in reality, it was the other way round, and the former usually had to make substantial bridewealth payments to obtain wives. Overall, some lineages would accumulate more wives and material wealth than others, meaning that the system was not driven primarily by reciprocity. The marriage system was quite messy and the chance of it breaking down increased with the number of groups involved.

In generalised exchange systems, more groups imply greater complexity to ensure that all wife-givers will eventually be on the receiving end, an issue that Lévi-Strauss had already foreseen. He thought that in practice there would be competition for women, leading to accumulation and therefore asymmetries in the system. According to Leach, in Kachin reality instabilities arose primarily from competition for bridewealth. Men sought to get the maximum profit in forms of either bridewealth or political advantage from their daughters' marriage. Lévi-Strauss had only accorded a symbolic role to marriage prestations, effectively overlooking their significance within the system. Leach argued that they are also (or even primarily) economic and political transactions and are frequently connected to transfers of rights over land, too.

Marriage exchanges need to be analysed within their wider economic and political context rather than in isolation, as Lévi-Strauss attempted. Leach charged the latter with neglecting the effects of material conditions on social relations. He also challenged the claims to universality made by Lévi-Strauss about the model, doubting whether structures generated by marriage rules would be the same in different social contexts.

== Critiques ==
=== Postmodernistic ===
By the late 1970s/early 1980s, alliance theory had lost influence. With the advent of postmodern interpretive-hermeneutic thought, structuralist and functionalist theories receded. Internal incoherence and a range of intrinsic limitations further reduced its appeal.

=== Excessive emphasis of affinal ties ===
By overstressing the structural significance of affinal ties, alliance theory effectively neglected the importance of descent and genealogical ties. Some societies (e.g. African tribal societies) employ descent as their primary organizational principle. In others, alliances are of primary significance, as in e.g. many Southeast Asian societies and amongst Amazon tribes; and still others emphasise both. The Yanomami fit very well into the alliance theory mold, while the Tallensi or Azande do not. Holý (1996) pointed out that some Middle-Eastern societies cannot be conclusively explained by either descent or alliance theory.

Critics also saw weaknesses in Lévi-Strauss' methods, in the fact that he looked for ideal structures, thereby neglecting the reality and complexity of actual practices. His model explained practices that were not observed. Kuper pointed out that if the structures of the mind really are universal and Lévi-Strauss' model is correct, then why do not all human societies act accordingly and structure their kinship systems around alliances and exchanges? Kuper allowed that exchange was the universal form of marriage, but there could be other significant factors. And even if reciprocity was the primary principle that underlies marriages, the return would not have to be in kind but could take other forms (such as money, livestock, services or favours of various kinds). Also, social cohesion through reciprocity does not have to rest primarily on the bride exchange. Mauss showed that different cultures use all kinds of gifts to create and maintain alliances.

Feminists critique Lévi-Strauss' claim that the underlying principle according to which all societies work is the exchange of women by men, who dispose of them as if they were objects. Others, for example Godelier, critiqued structuralism's synchronic approach that led it to be essentially ahistorical.

=== Materialistic perspectives ===
Marxists shifted the attention within anthropology from an almost exclusive preoccupation with kinship to an emphasis on economic issues. For them, social structures were primarily shaped by material conditions, property relations and class struggles.

=== Falsification ===
Structuralism's main propositions were not formulated in a way so that they could be subject to verification or falsification. Lévi-Strauss did not develop a framework that could prove the existence of his concept of the fundamental structures of human thought, but simply assumed their existence. Boyer pointed out that experimental research on concepts in psychology have not supported a structuralistic view of concepts, but rather a theory-oriented or prototype-based view.

== See also ==
- Structuralist theory of mythology
- Alliance theory
- Structuralism
- Post-structuralism
- Structural functionalism
- Claude Lévi-Strauss
- Roman Jakobson
- Marcel Mauss
- Edmund Leach
- Anthropologie structurale deux

== Sources ==
- Barnard, Alan (2000). History and Theory in Anthropology. Cambridge: Cambridge University Press.
- Barnard, Alan; Good, Anthony (1984). Research practices in the study of kinship. Academic Press.
- Barnes, J.A. (1971). Three Styles in the Study of Kinship. Taylor & Francis. ISBN 978-1-136-53500-0.
- Boyer, P. (31 May 2013). Mccorkle, William W.; Xygalatas, D (eds.). Explaining religious concepts. Lévi- Strauss the brilliant and problematic ancestor. Durham, UK: Acumen. pp. 164–75. ISBN 978-1-84465-664-6.
- D'Andrade, Roy G. (27 January 1995). The Development of Cognitive Anthropology. Cambridge University Press. ISBN 978-0-521-45976-1.
- Devlin, D. (2006). Late Modern. Susak Press.
- Holy, L. (1996). Anthropological Perspectives on Kinship. London: Pluto Press.
- Kuper, Adam (1988). The Invention of Primitive Society: Transformations of an Illusion. Psychology Press. ISBN 978-0-415-00903-4.
- Kuper, Adam (1996). Anthropology and Anthropologists. London: Routledge.
- Layton, Robert (1997). An Introduction to Theory in Anthropology. Cambridge University Press. ISBN 978-0-521-62982-9.
- Leach, E. 1954. Political Systems of Highland Burma. London: Bell.
- Leach, E. R. (1966). Rethinking Anthropology. Berg Publishers. ISBN 978-1-84520-004-6.
- Lévi-Strauss, Claude (1969). The Elementary Structures of Kinship. Boston: Beacon Press.
- Lévi-Strauss, Claude (1967) [1963]. Structural Anthropology. Translated by Jacobson, Claire; Schoepf, Brooke Grundfest. New York: Doubleday Anchor Books.
- Lévi-Strauss, Claude (1972). Structuralism and Ecology.
