= P. E. de Josselin de Jong =

Prof. Dr. P. E. de Josselin de Jong
- Born: July 8, 1922; Beijing, China
- Died: January 1, 1999 (aged 76); Oegstgeest, Netherlands
- Occupations: Indonesian and Malaysian ethnographer
- Known for: Research specializing in the Minangkabau people in West Sumatra.
- Children: 3

Patrick Edward de Josselin de Jong (July 8, 1922 – January 1, 1999) was a Dutch professor of cultural anthropology at the University of Leiden for over 30 years, and department chair from 1957 through 1987. His research specialization was on the Minangkabau people in West Sumatra.

De Josselin de Jong was considered a foremost general anthropologist in the tradition set by the Leiden University where he headed the Cultural Anthropology chair, and who inherited his anthropological skills from his equally illustrious uncle J.P.B. de Josselin de Jong, with his dominant field of interest centered on Indonesia. He was also a regional specialist, particularly in western Indonesia with structuralism as his main subject of interest. Structural anthropology originated at the University of Leiden during the 1920s and 1930s.

His bibliography lists 208 titles, including reprints and translations. He retired in 1987 as professor in cultural anthropology and became a professor emeritus thereafter. He was honoured in a farewell symposium where he gave his concluding lecture titled "The Sacred Ruler in Indonesia" in Dutch.

== Early life and education ==
De Josselin de Jong was born in Beijing in 1922. His father was Dutch and a former naval officer with the foreign service. His mother was Scottish.

De Josselin de Jong and his mother moved to the Netherlands when he was aged six in 1928, receiving his secondary education at Stedelijk Gymnasium Leiden. Under his father's influence, he enrolled in 1940 in a course in Indonesian Languages at Leiden University to prepare for a career as a linguist with the Dutch East Indies civil service.

He was the nephew of structural anthropologist J.P.B. de Josselin de Jong who coined the concept of the field of ethnological study in his second inaugural lecture (1935). The Leiden tradition was set by J.P.B. with the concept of Field of Ethnological Study; the focus being on the structural core of Indonesian societies. His successor continued and expanded this line of research (comparative structuralism).

De Josselin de Jong and J.P.B. regularly attended the evening meetings of the student society W.D.O. Peter Suzuki was his assistant. De Josselin de Jong occupied the room of his uncle in the University. J.P.B. had also gifted de Josselin de Jong with his personal toga or professional gown. J.P.B. had used this gown as a symbolic rite on 20 occasions while conferring doctorates on his students.

== Career ==
During the World War II, de Josselin de Jong was a member of the Dutch resistance. From November 1943 till 1945 he was involved in the publication of The Home Service, a magazine based on the broadcasts by the BBC. During this time he was also involved in forging documents.

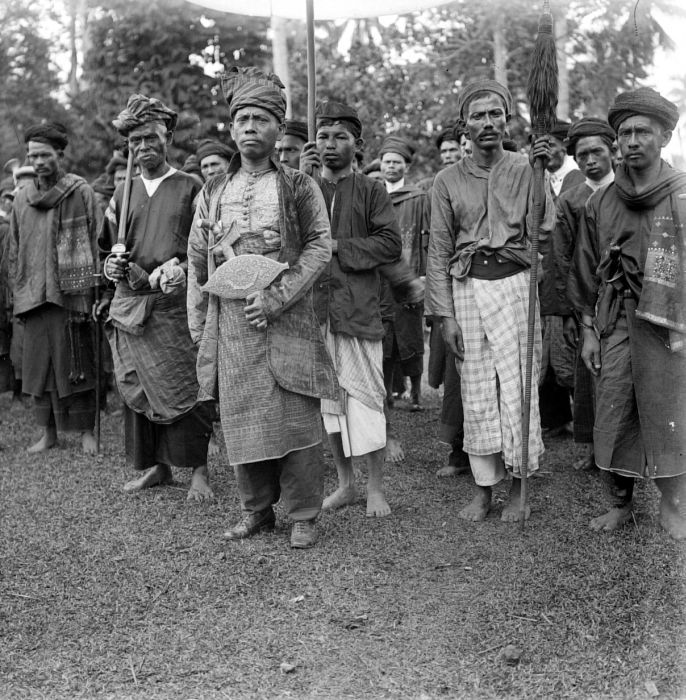
Minangkabau chiefs, a tribe which Josselin de Jong specialized in. Photo taken by the Dutch

De Josselin de Jong began his first job in 1949 at the National Museum of Ethnology in Leiden as assistant-curator. He worked in the Islam Department in the section that studied Muslim peoples, especially those who lived in Indonesia. He left this position in 1953 to accept a post as lecturer in Singapore.

From 1957, de Josselin de Jong was involved with teaching two major subjects at Leiden University: cultural anthropology in general, and cultural anthropology of South-East Asia and the South Seas, in particular. De Josselin de Jong differed from his mentor and uncle, J.P.B., in two main aspects namely: "firstly his view is much more cognitive (stressing the idea principles), and secondly, his view is transformational".

In January 1957, de Josselin de Jong was appointed to professor of cultural anthropology at the Leiden University, his uncle having retired in September 1956. He was chair of the department until 1987. After his appointment as professor, de Josselin de Jong preferred to denote the Leiden school as "Leidse richting" (Dutch, meaning something like "the tenor [way] of Leiden") which he considered an appropriate usage to the comparative and structural study under the well-known Leiden Tradition approach to the field of anthropological study not exclusive to Indonesia.

De Josselin de Jong's work at the university covered the third phase of the study of cultural anthropology at Leiden University. The first phase involved P.J. Veth, G.A. Wilken, J.J.M. de Groot, and A.W. Nieuwenhuis; J.P.B Josselin de Jong and W.H. Rassers were in the second phase (from 1920 on); the third phase started with the appointment of P.E. de Josselin de Jong. In his inaugural lecture of 1957, de Josselin de Jong termed his period as a turning point in the history of this study in the university. While the second phase was influenced by the work of Emile Durkheim and Marcel Mauss, as well as of Franz Boas and R.H. Lowie, the third phase was under the influence of Claude Lévi-Strauss (from 1949 on).

His bibliography lists 208 titles (including reprints and translations), nine books, and edited works, seven in English, one in Dutch and one in Bahasa Indonesia. He published 55 reviews, 136 articles, 3 comments, and also wrote articles with others, including 111 less substantial articles, translations and reprints. He classified his diverse publications under regional and non-regional (South East Asia), popular scientific and pure scientific works.

== Ideas ==
The principles adopted by de Josselin de Jong have been classified under four headings namely, Kinship, Insular South-East Asia, Political Myths and Cultural anthropology, which are not considered "mutually exclusive" but do overlap. Gingrich and Fox (2002) state that J.P.B. identified four elements that constitute a structural core within the field of ethnological study, including circulating connubium, double unilineality, dual symbolic classification, and resilience from foreign cultural influences.

== Professional organizations ==
On May 22, 1947, he gave his first speech at the Ethnological Society W.D.O.

In 1961, he was made an honorary member of Royal Asiatic Society. He was an Honorary Fellow of the Royal Anthropological Institute of Great Britain and Ireland (RAI) since 1972, and a member of the Royal Netherlands Academy of Arts and Sciences since 1974.

== Awards and honours ==
In April 1986, he was made Knight of the Order of the Netherlands Lion. He was also decorated for his wartime activities as Verzetsherdenkingskruis award.

== Death ==
De Josselin de Jong died in Oegstgeest on January 1, 1999.

== Selected works ==
- (1951), Minangkabau and Negri Sembilan: Socio-political structure in Indonesia
- (1957), Some directions in contemporary cultural anthropology
- (1987), Generalization in cultural anthropology
