= Bricolage =

Creation of an artwork from a diverse range of things that happen to be available

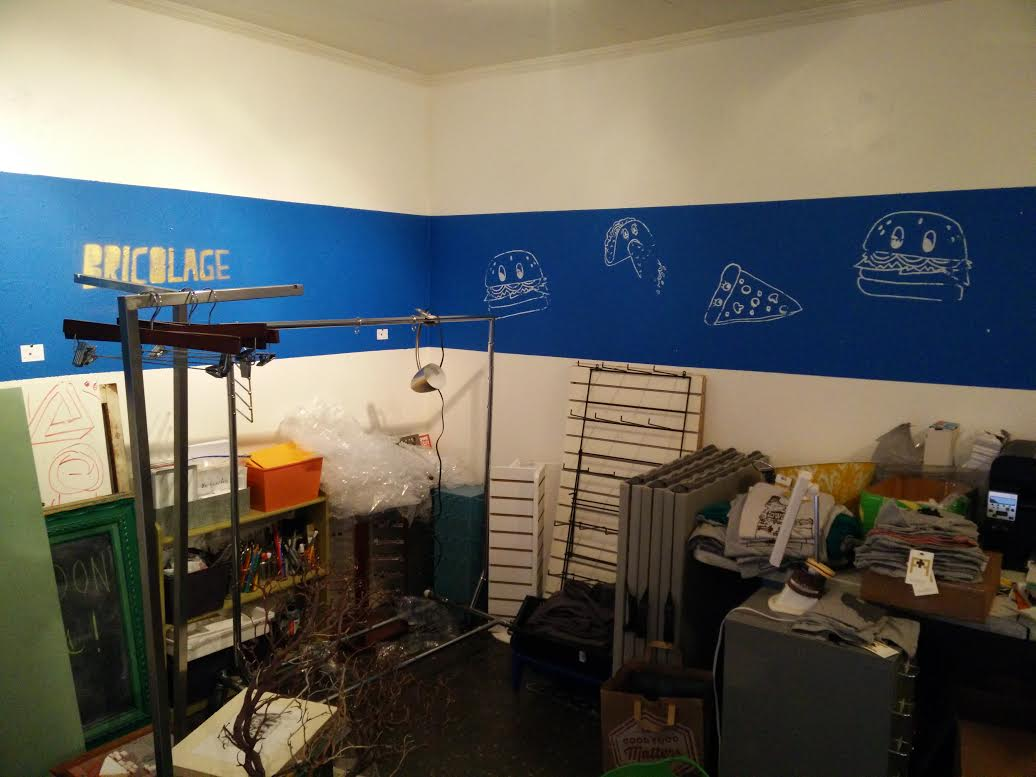
A maker space with potential bricolage material

In the arts, bricolage (French for "DIY" or "do-it-yourself projects"; French pronunciation: [bʁikɔlaʒ]) is the construction or creation of a work from a diverse range of things that happen to be available, or a work constructed using mixed media.

The term bricolage has also been used in many other fields, including anthropology, philosophy, critical theory, education, computer software, public health, and business.

== Origin ==
Bricolage is a French loanword that means the process of improvisation in a human endeavor. The word is derived from the French verb bricoler ("to tinker"), with the English term DIY ("Do-it-yourself") being the closest equivalent of the contemporary French usage. In both languages, bricolage also denotes any works or products of DIY endeavors.

== The arts ==
=== Visual art ===
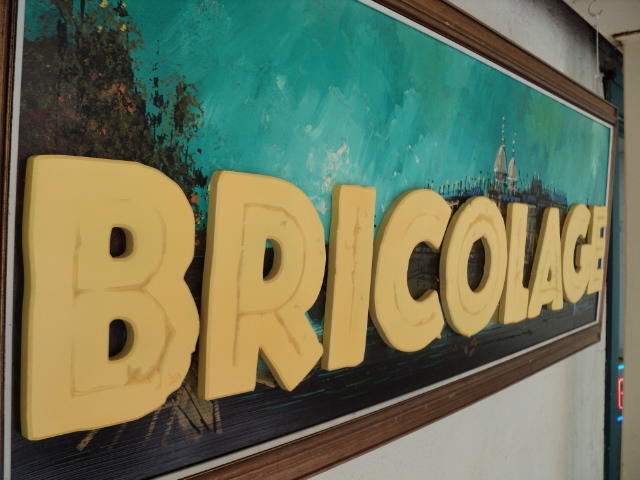
A self-referential sign built using bricolage techniques on a thrift-store painting

In art, bricolage is a technique or creative mode, where works are constructed from various materials available or on hand, and is often seen as a characteristic of postmodern art practice. It has been likened to the concept of curating and has also been described as the remixture, reconstruction, and reuse of separate materials or artifacts to produce new meanings and insights.

=== Architecture ===
Bricolage is considered the jumbled effect produced by the close proximity of buildings from different periods and in different architectural styles.

It is also a term that is admiringly applied to the architectural work of Le Corbusier, by Colin Rowe and Fred Koetter in their book Collage City, whom they called "a fox in hedgehog disguise," commenting on his wily approach to assembling ideas from found objects of the history of architecture, in contrast to Frank Lloyd Wright, who is called a "hedgehog" for being overly focused on a narrow concept.

== Academics ==
=== Anthropology ===
In anthropology, bricolage refers to a process of improvisation using available materials and ideas. Claude Lévi-Strauss introduced the concept in The Savage Mind (1962), contrasting the bricoleur—who creatively recombines existing elements—with the engineer, who works from theoretical plans. While he linked the bricoleur to mythical thought, Lévi-Strauss emphasized that this way of thinking is not inferior; in fact, scientific thought often involves bricolage. Later scholars, such as Hervé Varenne and Jill Koyama, extended the concept to describe the processual and improvised nature of cultural practices, especially in educational settings.

=== Biology ===
François Jacob applied Lévi-Strauss' conception to biological evolution, which turned out to be a rather successful transfer. His seminal article was published in English and the idea came be known as "evolutionary tinkering".

==== Contemporary critique by Tim Ingold ====
In the introduction to Creativity and Cultural Improvisation (2007), anthropologist Tim Ingold challenges Claude Lévi-Strauss's notion of bricolage, arguing that bricolage views creativity as the rearrangement of stable elements, whereas creativity in life involves the ongoing emergence and transformation of elements. Drawing on process philosophy—notably Henri Bergson and Alfred North Whitehead—he proposes a more fluid and emergent view of creativity, grounded in movement and becoming.

=== Literature ===
In literature, bricolage is affected by intertextuality, the shaping of a text's meanings by reference to other texts.

=== Cultural studies ===
In cultural studies, bricolage is used to mean the processes by which people acquire objects from across social divisions to create new cultural identities. In particular, it is a feature of subcultures such as the punk movement. Here, objects that possess one meaning (or no meaning) in the dominant culture are acquired and given a new, often subversive meaning. For example, the safety pin became a form of decoration in punk culture.

=== Social psychology ===
The term "psychological bricolage" is used to explain the mental processes through which an individual develops novel solutions to problems by making use of previously unrelated knowledge or ideas they already possess. The term, introduced by Jeffrey Sanchez-Burks, Matthew J. Karlesky and Fiona Lee in The Oxford Handbook of Creativity, Innovation, and Entrepreneurship of the University of Michigan, draws from two separate disciplines. The first, "social bricolage", was introduced by cultural anthropologist Claude Lévi-Strauss in 1962. Lévi-Strauss was interested in how societies create novel solutions by using resources that already exist in the collective social consciousness. The second, "creative cognition", is an intra-psychic approach to studying how individuals retrieve and recombine knowledge in new ways. Psychological bricolage, therefore, refers to the cognitive processes that enable individuals to retrieve and recombine previously unrelated knowledge they already possess. Psychological bricolage is an intra-individual process akin to Karl E. Weick's notion of bricolage in organizations, which is akin to Lévi-Strauss' notion of bricolage in societies.

=== Philosophy ===
In his book The Savage Mind (1962, English translation 1966), French anthropologist Claude Lévi-Strauss used the term "bricolage" to describe the characteristic patterns of mythological thought. In his description it is opposed to the engineers' creative thinking, which proceeds from goals to means. Mythical thought, according to Lévi-Strauss, attempts to re-use available materials in order to solve new problems.

Jacques Derrida extends this notion to any discourse. "If one calls bricolage the necessity of borrowing one's concept from the text of a heritage which is more or less coherent or ruined, it must be said that every discourse is bricoleur."

Gilles Deleuze and Félix Guattari, in their 1972 book Anti-Oedipus, identify bricolage as the characteristic mode of production of the schizophrenic producer.

=== Education ===
In the discussion of constructionism, Seymour Papert discusses two styles of solving problems. Contrary to the analytical style of solving problems, he describes bricolage as a way to learn and solve problems by trying, testing, playing around.

Joe L. Kincheloe and Shirley R. Steinberg have used the term bricolage in educational research to denote the use of multiperspectival research methods. In Kincheloe's conception of the research bricolage, diverse theoretical traditions are employed in a broader critical theoretical/critical pedagogical context to lay the foundation for a transformative mode of multimethodological inquiry. Using these multiple frameworks and methodologies, researchers are empowered to produce more rigorous and praxiological insights into socio-political and educational phenomena.

Kincheloe and Steinberg theorize a critical multilogical epistemology and critical connected ontology to ground the research bricolage. These philosophical notions provide the research bricolage with a sophisticated understanding of the complexity of knowledge production and the interrelated complexity of both researcher positionality and phenomena in the world. Such complexity demands a more rigorous mode of research that is capable of dealing with the complications of socio-educational experience. Such a critical form of rigor avoids the reductionism of many monological, mimetic research orientations (see Kincheloe, 2001, 2005; Kincheloe & Berry, 2004; Steinberg, 2015; Kincheloe, McLaren, & Steinberg, 2012).

== Information technology ==
=== Information systems ===
In information systems, bricolage is used by Claudio Ciborra to describe the way in which strategic information systems (SIS) can be built in order to maintain successful competitive advantage over a longer period of time than standard SIS. By valuing tinkering and allowing SIS to evolve from the bottom-up, rather than implementing it from the top-down, the firm will end up with something that is deeply rooted in the organisational culture that is specific to that firm and is much less easily imitated.

=== Internet ===
In her book Life on the Screen (1995), Sherry Turkle discusses the concept of bricolage as it applies to problem solving in code projects and workspace productivity. She advocates the "bricoleur style" of programming as a valid and underexamined alternative to what she describes as the conventional structured "planner" approach. In this style of coding, the programmer works without an exhaustive preliminary specification, opting instead for a step-by-step growth and re-evaluation process. In her essay "Epistemological Pluralism", Turkle writes: "The bricoleur resembles the painter who stands back between brushstrokes, looks at the canvas, and only after this contemplation, decides what to do next."

== Visual arts ==
The visual arts is a field in which individuals often integrate a variety of knowledge sets in order to produce inventive work. To reach this stage, artists read print materials across a wide array of disciplines, as well as information from their own social identities. For instance, the artist Shirin Neshat has integrated her identities as an Iranian exile and a woman in order to make complex, creative and critical bodies of work. This willingness to integrate diverse knowledge sets enables artists with multiple identities to fully leverage their knowledge sets. This is demonstrated by Jeffrey Sanchez-Burks, Chi-Ying Chen and Fiona Lee, who found that individuals were shown to exhibit greater levels of innovation in tasks related to their cultural identities when they successfully integrated those identities.

== Business ==
Karl Weick identifies the following requirements for successful bricolage in organizations.

- Intimate knowledge of resources
- Careful observation and listening
- Trusting one's ideas
- Self-correcting structures, with feedback

Glenn Gosnell, V & E Limited, defines the formal term "Bricoleurologist", as indicating expertise and experience in Bricoleurology, i.e. devising and implementing elegant solutions to immediate problems and issues. Those skilled in the art and practice of AMA (Alternate Means of Accomplishment) in the efficient and effective reconstitution of resources can be assigned the title "Bricoleurologist" by a company or institution.

== In popular culture ==
=== Fashion ===
In his essay "Subculture: The Meaning of Style", Dick Hebdige discusses how an individual can be identified as a bricoleur when they "appropriated another range of commodities by placing them in a symbolic ensemble which served to erase or subvert their original straight meanings". The fashion industry uses bricolage-like styles by incorporating items typically utilized for other purposes.

=== Television ===
- MacGyver is a television series in which the protagonist is the paragon of a bricoleur, creating solutions for the problem to be solved out of immediately available found objects.

== See also ==
- Chindōgu
- Collage
- Détournement
- Do it yourself
- Improvisation
- Intrapreneurial Bricolage
- Jugaad
- Jury rigging
- Kludge
- Life hack
- Maker culture
- Spolia
- Syncretism
- Pastiche
