= Dina Lévi-Strauss =

French ethnologist, anthropologist, sociologist, and philosopher (1911–1999)

Dina Dreyfus (French: [dʁɛfys]), also known as Dina Lévi-Strauss (French: [levi stʁos]; 1 February 1911, Milan – 25 February 1999, Paris) was a French ethnologist, anthropologist, sociologist, and philosopher, who conducted cultural research in South America.

== Early life ==
She studied philosophy at the University of Paris and also became an agrégé. She taught at the University of São Paulo in Brazil and later founded the first ethnological society in the country.

She met her husband through her brother, Pierre Dreyfus. In 1932 she married Claude Lévi-Strauss, who was also a French anthropologist. It can be assumed that part of his interest in ethnology was developed while working with Dina Levi-Strauss. In 1935 she joined the French cultural mission to lecture at the newly founded University of São Paulo. She taught a course on practical ethnology that attracted a large audience from the city's educated, French-speaking society. She also founded Brazil's first ethnological society with Mario de Andrade whom she met during her expedition with her husband to the Amazon rainforest. This ethnological society was called the Society for Ethnography and Folklore. She also participated in the French resistance in the 1940s based around World War II and later expanded on her teachings in philosophy.

== Work in Brazil ==
From 1936 to 1938 she undertook field research with her husband in Mato Grosso and Rondônia in the Amazon rainforest, studying the cultures of the Guaycuru and Bororo Indian tribes which was funded by The Department of Culture of the City of São Paulo. The study included herself and her husband along with twenty men, fifteen mules, and approximately thirty oxen. With this study they also brought with them guns and ammunition. She took photographs and made ethnographic films composed of the photographs that detailed the tribes being studied. Her usage of photography has been attributed to women taking part in significant filming linked to the Bororo's early history. She is noted to be precise in her efforts of recording the tribe and stressed the importance of audiovisual equipment. This includes her focusing on Bororo funeral ceremonies and the Mato Grosso's farming life. Most of her films were approximately eight minutes long and included titles such as A vida em uma aldeia Bororo (Life in a Bororo Village) and Cerimônias Fúnebres entre os Indios Bororo (Funeral Ceremonies among the Bororo Ι and ΙΙ).

The short films and photographs produced by her were later applied to a future course that she would present to members of the Society of Ethnography and Folklore. Her main goal from this was to create a collection of field data that would place anthropology in a more systematic perspective while also displaying the diversity of Brazilian culture found from her past research. Although this goal can be partially credited to her peer, Mario de Andrade who placed complaints towards the prior lack of content present in her initial films in relation to her usage of scientific approaches. One of the ways she was able to make progress on these goals was through her focus on excluding herself and her husband from the scenes and instead capturing the material culture.

Artifacts collected during the Mato Grosso expedition first were exhibited in Paris at the Musée de l'Homme during 1937. The title of the exhibition, Indiens du Mato-Grosso (Mission Claude et Dina Lévi-Strauss), recognized the contributions of both scientists. Dina found that through items, individuals can transfer the traits from their actions into the objects that can reflect human cultures and beliefs. She also remarked how the phases these objects go through can affect how the object will be classified. This ideology of her was reflected in her lectures at the university where she also included the teachings of Frazer and Boas. She was also known to have heavily referenced Marcel Mauss in her lectures.

In 1938, she returned with her husband to Brazil to continue research on indigenous tribes. The two main tribes of their study was the Nambikwara and Tupi-Kawahib. Their study, specifically for the Nambikwara, was focused on subsidence and residence. She is considered to have taken pride in this work although had moments of hesitation when she felt overwhelmed by the Nambikwara tribal groups. This was in relation to her learning that the Nambikwara dipped their arrows in a curare that is capable of causing asphyxia. During the last and longest expedition to the Nambikwara she contracted an eye infection that forced her return to São Paulo, from which she then returned to France in 1938. Her husband remained and concluded the expedition.

== Later life ==
It was a while after their expedition work among the Nambikwara that they later divorced. One of the noted reasons behind this, was that Claude Lévi-Strauss chose to escape Vichy France to Martinique, while Dina remained in France and participated in the French resistance. The couple Lévi-Strauss separated in 1939, and divorced at the latest in 1945, when Claude Lévi-Strauss remarried. Dina took back her maiden name Dreyfus.

In the following decades, her influence upon her husband and her contribution to their joint expeditions fell largely into oblivion when her role was ignored in the writings of her former husband that became so important to the field of anthropology. When Claude Lévi-Strauss described his Brazilian experience in his 1955 classic, Tristes Tropiques, he mentioned his former wife only once, noting the moment when she had to separate from the last expedition.

She later worked as a philosophy teacher in a Lycée, in university preparation classes, and in university, and she became an inspecteur général in the French education system. In the 1950s, she published articles on Bernanos and Simone Weil; in the 1960s, she translated Hume and Freud.

She later died at age 88 in Paris on 25 February 1999.
