= Henri Lavachery =

Belgian archeologist

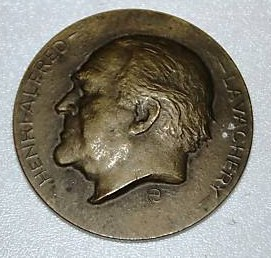
- Portrait by Armand Bonnetain on a 70 mm medal from the Royal Academy of Belgium, circa 1960
- Born: 6 May 1885; Liège
- Died: 1 December 1972 (aged 87)
- Occupation: Archaeologist

Henri Alfred Lavachery (French pronunciation: [ɑ̃ʁi alfʁɛd lavaʃʁi]; 6 May 1885 – 1 December 1972) was a Belgian archaeologist and ethnologist. In 1934, he became the first professional archaeologist to visit Easter Island, and was later known for his study of its art. He was curator at the Royal Museums of Art and History during the 1940s, and founded the Society of Americanists in Belgium in 1928.

== Early years ==
Lavachery was born in Liège in 1885, and received his doctorate in classical philology from the University of Brussels in 1908. Thereafter, he traveled extensively through Europe, participating in various internships, including one at the Frobenius Institute in Frankfurt, and another in Paris under the direction of Paul Rivet at the Musée d'Ethnographie du Trocadéro.

== Career ==
In 1933, fascinated by the objects created by the Rapa Nui people, Lavachery decided to develop an expedition to Easter Island, with Rivet's support. The expedition took place between 27 July 1934 and 2 January 1935. It was headed by Louis Charles Watelin, a French archaeologist who died during the trip in Tierra del Fuego. Other expedition members included the Swiss anthropologist Alfred Métraux, and a Chilean doctor, Dr. Israel Drapkin, who provided leprosy care for affected indigenous people. The expedition discovered that the island's large stone statues had been made by the ancestors of the current occupants, who were of Polynesian descent, and not by members of a prior civilization who had disappeared. Lavachery noted that the island's petroglyphs were sometimes discovered simultaneously by the trip's explorers and the island dwellers. His later observations of the petroglyphs in 1939 suggested a degree of artistic diversity among the creators. According to Thor Heyerdahl, although Lavachery was the only professional archaeologist to have visited the island prior to Heyerdahl's 1950s voyage, Lavachery had not attempted excavations, as the soil appeared too shallow.

In the 1930s, Lavachery also wrote about the art of the central African Kuba Kingdom, describing it as decorative rather than sculptural. This work was translated from the French to English by playwright and novelist Samuel Beckett. In the 1930s at the Palais des Beaux-Arts, Lavachery organized the first major exhibition of African art in Belgium.

In 1933, he became the assistant curator at Royal Museums of Art and History in Brussels, and in 1942, he became Chief Curator, taking over from Jean Capart. After World War II, Lavachery began to reorganize the institution. He was Professor of non-European art at the Free University of Brussels, as well as a member of the Royal Academies for Science and the Arts of Belgium and its permanent secretary from 1957 to 1960. In addition, he founded the Society of Americanists in Belgium in 1928.

== Personal life and legacy ==
Created in 1961, the Prix Henri Lavachery (English: Henri Lavachery prize) is awarded every five years by the Royal Academy of Belgium for achievements in ethnology.

Lavachery was awarded the Grand Officer Order of Leopold, Commander of the Order of the Crown, Medal of the Armed Resistance 1940-1945, and Chevalier of the Legion of Honor. He died in Brussels in 1972.

== Partial list of works ==
- Deux fragments de la statuaire monumentale des Mayas (192?)
- Les arts anciens d'Amérique au Musée archéologique de Madrid (1929)
- Enquête sur l'importance respective du marché intérieur et du marché extérieur pour l'industrie belge (1933)
- La mission Franco-Belge dans l'Ile de Paques (Juillet 1934-Avril 1935) (1935)
- Contribution à l'étude de l'archéologie de l'île de Pitcairn (1936)
- Sculpteurs modernes de L'lle de Pagues (1937)
- Les pétroglyphes de l'île de Pâques (1939)
- Vie des Polynésiens (1946)
- Les Amériques avant Colomb (1946)
- Art précolombien (1947)
- Tombeau de Georges Marlow (1951)
- Hypothèse pour une évolution primitive des arts plastiques (1952)
- Statuaire de l'Afrique noire (1954)
- Les techniques de protection des biens culturels en cas de conflit armé (1954)

== See also ==
- Anthropology
- Archaeology
- Ethnography
- Easter Island
- Royal Academies for Science and the Arts of Belgium
