= The Savage Mind =

1962 book by Claude Lévi-Strauss

- Cover of the first edition
- Author: Claude Lévi-Strauss
- Original title: La Pensée sauvage
- Translator: Anonymous
- Language: French
- Subjects: Anthropology; Structuralism
- Publisher: Librairie Plon (Paris)
- Publication date: 1962
- Publication place: France
- English publication date: 1966
- Media type: Print

The Savage Mind (French: La Pensée sauvage), also translated as Wild Thought, is a 1962 work of structural anthropology by the anthropologist Claude Lévi-Strauss.

== Summary ==
=== "The Savage Mind" ===
Lévi-Strauss makes clear that "la pensée sauvage" refers not to the discrete mind of any particular type of human, but rather to 'untamed' human thought: "In this book it is neither the mind of savages nor that of primitive or archaic humanity, but rather mind in its untamed state as distinct from mind cultivated or domesticated for the purpose of yielding a return."

Savage thought, Lévi-Strauss argues, continually gathers and applies structures wherever they can be used. If scientific thought is represented by the engineer who asks a question and tries to design an optimal or complete solution, savage thought resembles the bricoleur, who constructs things using whatever materials are at hand.

One of Lévi-Strauss's many examples is the relationship between two Australian groups, the Aranda and the Arabanna. The Aranda have a complex system for intermarriages that divides all people into two groups and then four stages within each group. The system specifies where the children will live and how they will marry. The Arabanna use a different system for marriages, but somehow use the Aranda's marriage system for determining the sex and affiliation of reincarnated spirits. The structure has been borrowed and transposed, appropriated because of its ability to generate a certain economy independently of its substrate.

=== Critique of totemism ===
Lévi-Strauss (continuing the argument from Totemism, his previous work) criticizes the concept of totemism for arbitrarily prioritizing a particular structural relation. He admits the reality of totemism, in which, within a larger group, smaller groups distinguish themselves through identification with a plant or animal. He denies, however, that totemic societies differ fundamentally from societies that divide people on the basis of caste. Totems, he argues, are just another way to create necessary distinctions within a larger group. These distinctions may have greater or lesser practical significance, but ultimately:

Totemism, which has been rendered amply formal in 'primitive language', could at the cost of a very simple transformation equally well be expressed in the language of the regime of castes which is quite the reverse of primitive. This is already sufficient to show that we are here dealing not with an autonomous institution, which can be defined by its distinctive properties and is typical of certain regions of the world and certain forms of civilization but with a modus operandi which can be discerned even behind social structures traditionally defined in a way diametrically opposed to totemism.

In other words, the operation of identifying with a totem is secondary to the underlying process of re-appropriating structure (for example, observed differences between animals) for the purposes of society.

== English translation ==
The English translation of The Savage Mind appeared in 1966. However, the anthropologist Clifford Geertz called the translation "execrable" and insisted on using his own translations from the French edition. A new translation by Jeffrey Mehlman and John Leavitt was published under the title Wild Thought in 2021.

== Reception ==
The Savage Mind was one of the earliest works of structural anthropology and had a large influence on the field of anthropology.

The book also played a role within the larger currents of structuralism and post-structuralism. The application of bricolage to social structure provided the inspiration for the philosopher Jacques Derrida's essay "Structure, Sign and Play". The idea that social structures can be transposed and recontextualized also plays a large role in the philosopher Gilles Deleuze and the psychoanalyst Félix Guattari's Capitalism and Schizophrenia.
