= The Raw and the Cooked =

1964 book by Claude Lévi-Strauss

- Cover of the first edition
- Author: Claude Lévi-Strauss
- Original title: Le Cru et le cuit
- Translator: John and Doreen Weightman
- Series: Mythologiques
- Publisher: Plon
- Publication date: 1964
- Media type: Print
- Pages: 402 pp.
- ISBN: 978-2-259-00413-8
- OCLC: 4955922

The Raw and the Cooked (1964) is the first volume from Mythologiques, a structural study of Amerindian mythology written by French anthropologist Claude Lévi-Strauss. It was originally published in French as Le Cru et le Cuit. Although the book is part of a larger volume, Lévi-Strauss writes that it may be appreciated on its own merits, stating that he does not consider this first volume a beginning "since it would have developed along similar lines if it had had a different starting point".

In the introduction, Lévi-Strauss writes of his confidence that "certain categorical opposites drawn from everyday experience with the most basic sorts of things—e.g. 'raw' and 'cooked,' 'fresh' and 'rotten,' 'moist' and 'parched,' and others—can serve a people as conceptual tools for the formation of abstract notions and for combining these into propositions." Beginning with a Bororo myth, Lévi-Strauss analyses 187 myths, reconstructing sociocultural formations using binary oppositions based on sensory qualities. The work thus presents an adaptation of Ferdinand de Saussure's theories of structural linguistics applied to a different field.

== See also ==
- Culinary triangle
