= Anthropologie structurale deux =

Collection of texts by Claude Lévi-Strauss

The Anthropologie structurale deux (also known by the title of Structural Anthropology) is a collection of texts by Claude Lévi-Strauss that was first published in 1973, the year Lévi-Strauss was elected to the Académie française. The texts are in turn a result of an earlier collection of texts, Anthropologie structurale, that he had published in 1958.

The work is considered to be the origin of the idea of structural anthropology.

== Table of Contents ==
=== Perspective Views ===
- The Scope of Anthropology
- Jean-Jacques Rousseau, Founder of the Sciences of Man
- What Ethnology owes to Durkheim
- The Work of the Bureau of American Ethnology and Its Lessons
- Comparative Religions of Nonliterate Peoples

=== Social Organization ===
- The Meaning and Use of the Notion of Model
- Reflections on the Atom of Kinship

=== Mythology and Ritual ===
- Structure and Form: Reflections on a Work by Vladimir Propp
- The Story of Asdiwal
- Four Winnebago Myths
- The Sex of the Sun and Moon
- Mushrooms in Culture: Apropos of a Book by R.G. Wasson
- Relations of Symmetry Between Rituals and Myths of Neighboring Peoples
- How Myths Die

=== Humanism and the Humanities ===
- Answers to Some Investigations
- Scientific Criteria in the Social and Human Disciplines
- Cultural Discontinuity and Economic and Social Development
- Race and History
