= Society of Americanists in Belgium =

Anthropological society in Belgium

The Society of Americanists in Belgium (Société des Américanistes de Belgique; SAB) is an anthropological society in Brussels, Belgium. It was founded by Henri Lavachery. A partner of University of Louvain (UCLouvain), SAB publishes the journal Bulletin de la Société des Américanistes de Belgique. Its second Congress was held in 2002.
