= Culinary triangle =

Group of cooking techniques

Culinary triangle

The culinary triangle is a concept described by French anthropologist Claude Lévi-Strauss involving three types of cooking: boiling, roasting, and smoking, usually done to meat.

Boiling meat is seen to be a cultural form of cooking because it uses a receptacle to hold water, therefore it is not completely natural. In most cultures, this form of cooking is usually conducted by women and is served domestically to small closed groups, such as families.

Roasting meat is a less refined way of cooking because it does not use a receptacle. It is done by directly exposing the meat to the fire. The meat is most commonly offered to guests and this type of preparation is associated with men in many cultures. As opposed to boiling, roasted meat can lose some parts during cooking, thus it is also associated with destruction and loss.

Smoking meat is also a natural way of cooking. It is also done without a receptacle and in the same way as roasting. It is a slower method of roasting, however, which makes it somewhat like boiling.

According to Claude Lévi-Strauss, other cooking methods could be situated within this triangle. For example, grilling meat, by nature of the meat being situated "with lesser distance [...] to fire", could be situated "at the apex of the recipe triangle" (above the roasted), while steamed food, located further from the water than boiled, would be placed "halfway between the boiled and the smoked."
