= Tristes Tropiques =

1955 memoir by Claude Lévi-Strauss

- Cover of the first edition
- Author: Claude Lévi-Strauss
- Translator: John Russell
- Language: French
- Series: Collection Terre humaine
- Subject: Anthropology
- Published: 1955 (Librairie Plon, in French); 1961 (Hutchinson & Co, in English)
- Publication place: France, Brazil
- Media type: Print
- Pages: 404 (1961 English edition); 425 (1975 Atheneum edition)
- ISBN: 2-266-11982-6

Tristes Tropiques (the French title translates literally as "Sad Tropics") is a memoir, first published in France in 1955, by the anthropologist and structuralist Claude Lévi-Strauss. It documents his travels and anthropological work, focusing principally on Brazil, though it refers to many other places, such as the Caribbean and India. Although ostensibly a travelogue, the work is infused with philosophical reflections and ideas linking many academic disciplines, such as sociology, geology, music, history and literature. The book was first translated into English by John Russell as A World on the Wane.

== Contents ==
The book consists of 36 chapters, organised into nine sections.

Parts 1 to 3 detail Lévi-Strauss' reflections on leaving Europe and visiting the New World and the Tropics, comparing his first impressions with subsequent visits, relating aspects of his academic training as well as his work as a professor during the founding years of University of São Paulo.

Part 4 'The Earth and its Inhabitants' sets out a geographical analysis of the development of South American settlements, as well as an aside into social structure in India and what is now Pakistan and Bangladesh.

Parts 5 through 8 each focus on a Native Brazilian culture group: Caduveo (or Guaycuru), Bororó, Nambikwara and Tupi-Kawahib respectively, while touching on many other topics.

Part 9 'The Return' closes the book with reflections on, among other themes, the nature and purpose of anthropology, the effects of travel on the mind, the roles of Buddhism and Islam in global culture, humankind's place in the universe and our connections to the world and to one another.

== Style ==
The opening sentence, 'I hate traveling and explorers', is notable for its irony. In general, the narrative is highly reflexive, often critiquing itself or the author's and reader's assumed pretensions, such as a thirst for the 'exotic'.

Though the writing style is fluid, almost conversational at times, the structure of the text is extremely complex, linking together numerous places, times and ideas. For example, Part One: 'An End to Journeying' connects Lévi-Strauss' first trip to Brazil in 1935 with his escape from France to New York City in 1941 and his later visits to South America, in a stylistic imitation of memory.

Lévi-Strauss frequently makes connections between ostensibly diverse entities or ideas to underline a point. For example, in Chapter 14, he compares the ancient cities of the Indus valley with those of the US in the mid-20th century, implying that Mohenjo-Daro and Harappa could be imagined as foreshadowing contemporary Chicago or São Paulo 'after a prolonged period of involution in the European chrysalis'.

The work maintains an elegiac and poetic tone, lamenting a 'lost' New World but is tempered by a strong ambivalence, perhaps a product of the paradoxical idealized status of the anthropologist as a 'detached observer' who nevertheless remains engaged as a human participant.

Lévi-Strauss provides assessments of the impact of development on the environment, the 'shrinking' of the world through travel and tourism and the consequent emergence of a form of 'monoculture'.

== Critical reception and influence ==
The book was well-received on its publication. The organizers of the Prix Goncourt lamented that they were not able to award Lévi-Strauss the prize because Tristes Tropiques was technically non-fiction. Georges Bataille wrote a favourable review and Susan Sontag classed it as one of the 20th century's 'great books'.

== See also ==
- Le Monde's 100 Books of the Century
