= Structuralist theory of mythology =

Method of analyzing mythology

The structuralist theory of mythology is a method of analyzing mythology, in which the mythology is treated as if it follows the same structure and rules as language. The method was devised by French anthropologist Claude Lévi-Strauss, who claimed that myth, like language, can be broken down into constituents (which he called "mythemes" in the case of mythology). Each constituent could then be addressed separately but, at the same time, compared and contrasted with the other constituents. The structuralist method differs from the symbolist method, which instead seeks meaning solely within the constituents and not between them.

== Overview ==
Lévi-Strauss breaks down his argument into three main parts. Meaning is not isolated within the specific fundamental parts of the myth, but rather within the composition of these parts. Although myth and language are of similar categories, language functions differently in myth. Language in myth exhibits more complex functions than in any other linguistic expression. From these suggestions, he draws the conclusion that myth can be broken down into constituent units, and these units are different from the constituents of language.

Finally, unlike the constituents of language, the constituents of a myth, which he labels "mythemes", function as "bundles of relations". This approach is a break from the “symbolists”, such as Carl Jung, who dedicate themselves to find meaning solely within the constituents rather than their relations. For instance, Lévi-Strauss uses the example of the Oedipus myth and breaks it down to its component parts:

Reading it in sequence from left to right, top to bottom, the myth is categorized sequentially and by similarities. Through analyzing the commonalities between the "mythemes" of the Oedipus story, understanding can be wrought from its categories. Thus, a structural approach towards myths is to address all of these constituents. Furthermore, a structural approach should account for all versions of a myth, as all versions are relevant to the function of the myth as a whole. This leads to what Lévi-Strauss calls a spiral growth of the myth that is continuous while the structure itself is not. The growth of the myth only ends when the "intellectual impulse which has produced it is exhausted".

== From mythology to literary criticism ==
Myths are primarily acknowledged as oral traditions, while literature is in the form of written text. Still, anthropologists and literary critics both acknowledge the links between myths and relatively more contemporary literature. Therefore, many literary critics take the same Lévi-Straussian structuralist, as it is coined, approach to literature. This approach is, again, similar to Symbolist critics' approach to literature. There is a search for the lowest constituent of the story. But as with the myth, Lévi-Straussian structuralism then analyzes the relations between these constituent parts in order to compare even greater relations between versions of stories as well as among stories themselves.

Furthermore, Lévi-Strauss suggests that the structural approach and mental processes dedicated towards analyzing the myth are similar in nature to those in science. This connection between myth and science is further elaborated in his books, Myth and Meaning and The Savage Mind. He suggests that the foundation of structuralism is based upon an innate understanding of the scientific process, which seeks to break down complex phenomena into its component parts and then analyze the relations between them. The structuralist approach to myth is precisely the same method, and as a method this can be readily applied to literature.

== See also ==
- Joseph Campbell
- Vladimir Propp

== Sources ==
- Boon, James A. From Symbolism to Structuralism. New York: Harper & Row, 1972.
- Hénaff, Marcel. Claude Lévi-Strauss and the making of structural anthropology, translated by Mary Baker, Minneapolis: University of Minnesota Press, 1998.
- Lévi-Strauss, Claude. Myth and Meaning. New York: Schocken Books, 1978.
- Lévi-Strauss, Claude. Structural Anthropology. Trans. Claire Jacobson. New York: Basic Books, 1963.
