= Mythologiques =

Anthropological publication

Mythologiques is a four-volume work of cultural anthropology by Claude Lévi-Strauss. Originally written in French, the works were translated into English by John and Doreen Weightman.

The four volumes of Mythologiques are:

1. The Raw and the Cooked (Le Cru et le cuit) - First published 1964. Translated in 1969
2. From Honey to Ashes (Du miel aux cendres) - First published in 1966. Translated in 1973
3. The Origin of Table Manners (L'Origine des manières de table) - First published in 1968. Translated in 1978
4. The Naked Man (L'Homme nu) - First published in 1971. Translated in 1981.
