= Evolutionary tinkering =

Concept in biology

Evolutionary tinkering is an explanation of how evolution happens in nature. It explains that evolution works as a tinkerer who experiments with miscellaneous items, unsure of the outcome, and utilizes whatever is available to craft functional objects whose utility may only become evident later. None of the materials serve a defined purpose initially, and each can be employed in multiple ways. According to the tinkering concept, "evolution does not produce novelties from scratch". It comes from previously unseen associations of old materials to modify an existing system to give a new function or combine systems together to enhance the functions. The transformation from unicellular to multicellular during evolution is such an event which has elaborated the existing function.

The process of evolutionary tinkering takes eons. Tinkering involves continuously refining creations—making adjustments, trimming or extending, and gradually tailoring them to their evolving purposes.

Most of the time, traits in nature are barely favorable enough for organisms to survive. For instance, RuBisCO is profoundly inefficient, despite the fact that it catalyzes one of the most important reactions on the planet: carbon fixation. This is likely due to the enzyme originating in the common ancestor of all plastids when the atmospheric conditions were drastically different than they are today.

== François Jacob ==
In his seminal article 'Evolution and Tinkering', François Jacob first introduced the idea of tinkering to a broad audience of scientists, drawing from diverse fields such as molecular biology, evolutionary biology, and cultural anthropology. The concept of tinkering, or more precisely, the notion of bricolage, serves as a theoretical framework for analyzing various phenomena characterized by a common underlying process: the opportunistic rearrangement and recombination of existing elements. Jacob and Monod also won the Nobel Prize in 1965 for his work on the lac operon.

== Engineering versus tinkering ==
Natural selection is frequently likened to the work of an engineer, yet this analogy falls short. Unlike the engineer who operates based on meticulous planning and a clear vision of the end product, evolution lacks such deliberate intent. Additionally, while the engineer has access to carefully selected materials and specialized equipment tailored for their tasks, evolution relies on the resources available in its surroundings.

Moreover, the engineer's creations tend to approach a level of perfection achievable with current technology, whereas evolution does not strive for perfection but rather resembles a tinkerer. This tinkerer, akin to evolution, lacks a precise blueprint of the outcome and instead utilizes whatever materials are at hand to fashion something functional. While the engineer depends on specific materials and tools precisely suited to their project, the tinkerer makes do with miscellaneous scraps and remnants. The resulting creations of the tinkerer emerge from a series of opportunistic events, enriching their repertoire with each encounter.

The development of lungs in terrestrial vertebrates illustrates a process akin to tinkering rather than deliberate engineering. It originated in certain freshwater fish faced with oxygen deficient environments, leading them to ingest air and absorb oxygen through their esophageal walls. Over time, this behavior favored the enlargement of the esophageal surface area, eventually giving rise to lung-like structures through the emergence and enlargement of esophageal diverticula.

The brain is the key adaptive feature of humans, yet still holds mysteries regarding its precise purpose. The brain has also evolved through natural selection over millions of years, like other body parts, primarily to serve our reproductive needs. However, the human brain's development was more complex unlike straightforward evolutionary changes such as a leg into a wing. It involved adding new structures, particularly the neocortex, onto older ones. This rapid evolution led to a division between the neocortex, responsible for intellectual functions, and the older structures, controlling emotional and visceral activities. These older structures lack the discriminative and symbolic abilities of the neocortex and are primarily associated with emotions. Despite the dominance of the neocortex in intellectual processes, the older structures maintain strong connections with automatic centers, ensuring vital functions like obtaining food and responding to threats. This evolutionary process, characterized by the emergence of a dominant neocortex alongside the persistence of older systems, resembles a tinkering process, where new elements are added onto existing ones without fully replacing them.

== Evolution by molecular tinkering ==
Jacob was convinced that although morphological analysis supports his notion of bricolage, one would find more evidence of tinkering at the molecular level. The tinkering model suggests that the genes of the earliest organisms were very short, and all subsequent genes were formed by duplication, combination, and reassorting these original sequences. It is well established that gene duplication has produced a great deal of diversity throughout evolutionary history. One example of molecular tinkering can be found in mitochondrial nucleoproteins, some of which originate from eukaryotes; in this case, the tinkerer used whatever tools were at her disposal, including materials from an entirely different taxonomic domain.

To understand molecular tinkering, it is important to grasp the concept of a protein domain, which is a distinct region of a protein that has a defined shape, which determines the function of the protein. Some have used the analogy of Lego blocks to explain: the domains can be taken apart and put together again in unique ways, thus changing the shape and function of the protein. There are many different means by which tinkering can result in molecular and phenotypic novelty, primarily by taking apart the Lego blocks of proteins and putting them together again in unique patterns. Generally, these processes add to the organizational complexity of the genome, the proteome, or both.

=== Internal gene duplication ===
There are several forms of gene duplication. The product of whole-gene duplication is two copies of the gene, whereas that of diploid-type gene duplication is one gene that has doubled in length. Internal gene duplication results in repeated nucleotide sequences within a gene, and less than 100% of the gene is replicated. Because adding nucleotides to a sequence could impact splicing, this process may result in changing the identity of introns and exons; alternatively, the sequence may retain its original identity as an exon or intron, respectively. If an exon that encodes for one or more domains is duplicated, this could directly result in a more complex protein via domain accretion. Eukaryotic genes have undergone frequent internal gene duplication throughout evolutionary history. One example is seen in the dinucleotide-binding regions of glyceraldehyde 3-phosphate dehydrogenase and alcohol dehydrogenase: the duplicated domain is capable of binding with more molecules than the unduplicated. Another is the ovomucoid gene, which is the product of two internal duplications.

=== Mosaic proteins ===
Mosaic proteins are encoded by chimeric genes (or mosaic genes). These genes result from domain shuffling, which is accomplished via exon shuffling, gene fusion, or gene fission. Domain shuffling has been found to be at least partially responsible for some traits in modern vertebrates. Most domains only have a small number of uses, while very few domains are used as Lego blocks over and over again in multidomain proteins. Phenotypic innovation does not arise solely from the creation of new proteins, but also from changing gene expression and protein-protein interactions. One example of novelty associated with domain shuffling is multicellularity.

Gene fusion (the creation of a fusion gene by joining two genes together) and gene fission or fragmentation, which results in splitting one gene with many domains into multiple smaller genes, are the other two molecular mechanisms by which mosaic proteins can be formed.

=== Alternative splicing ===
Alternative splicing is another mechanism of molecular tinkering that may be responsible for increasing diversity in the proteome. One special kind of alternative splicing is nested genes, which produce intron-encoded proteins. It has been proposed that nested gene structures could be maintained via neutral processes according to the neutral theory of evolution.

=== De novo evolution of protein-coding genes from non-coding DNA ===
De novo gene birth is very rare. The most probable path from noncoding DNA to a protein-coding gene is to first become a protogene, similar to how functional genes first become pseudogenes before becoming completely nongenic. Although they are too rare to notably increase the number of proteins in a given lineage, the tinkering model posits that adding just a few Lego blocks to the collection allows for many new possible combinations of domains, i.e., proteins with new shapes and functions.

=== Exonization of introns and pseudoexonization of exons ===
Exonization is a very rare phenomenon in which an intron becomes an exon. In pseudoexonization, an exon becomes nonfunctional; this in turn changes the shape and function of the protein.

=== Gene loss and unitary pseudogenes ===
When selective constraints disappear, it is possible for genes to be lost via one of two mechanisms. The first is deleting a single-copy gene. The second is nonfunctionalization of a single-copy gene; this produces a unitary pseudogene, which has no functional paralogs, is comparable to vestigial anatomical structures, and is uncommon due to its often deleterious nature. In the rare case that gene loss becomes fixed in a population, it is difficult to definitively say what was the cause.
