= Claude Lévi-Strauss =

French anthropologist and ethnologist (1908–2009)

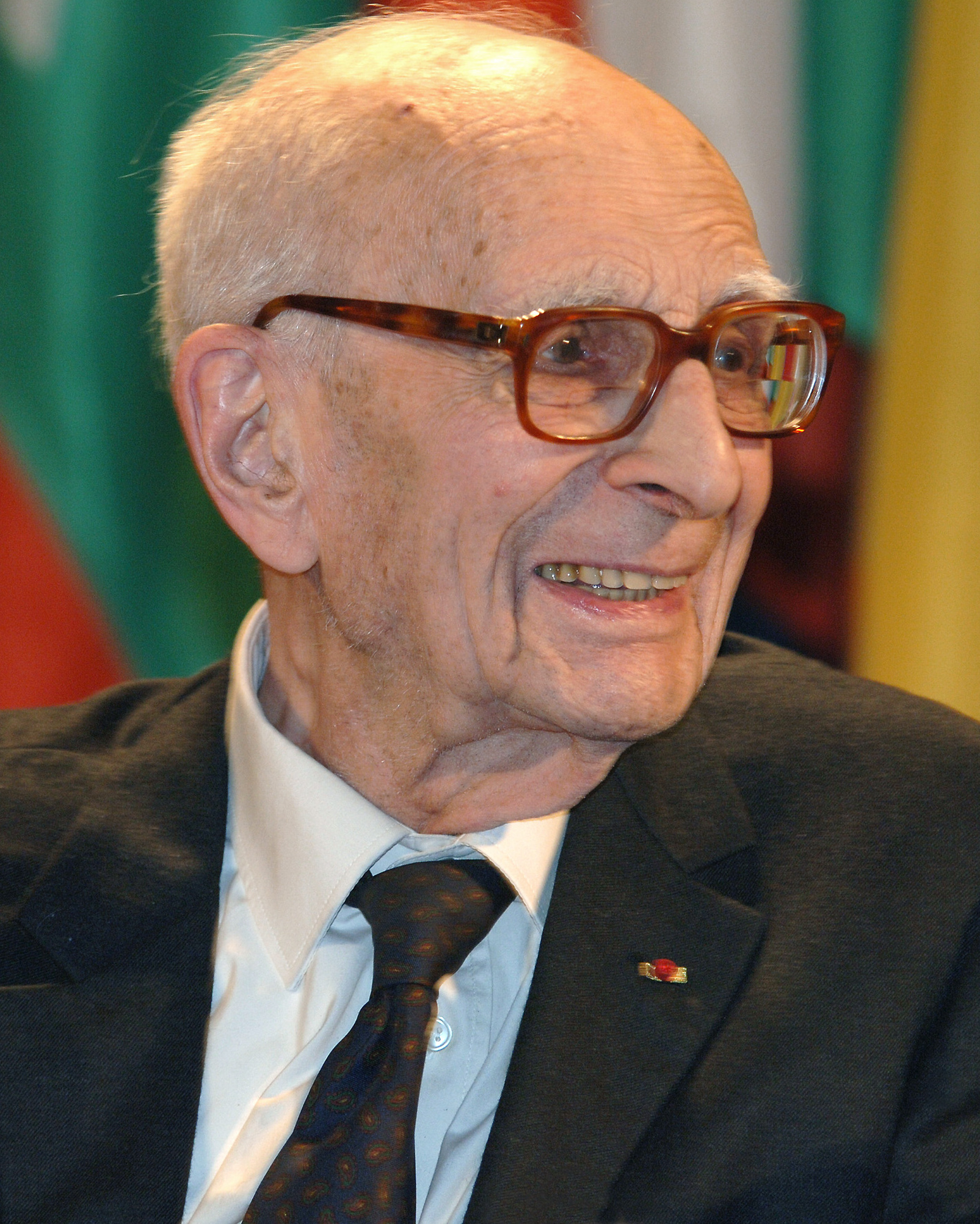
- Lévi-Strauss in 2005
- Born: 28 November 1908; Brussels, Belgium
- Died: 30 October 2009 (aged 100); Paris, France
- Political party: SFIO (1927–1936)
- Spouse(s): Dina Dreyfus (m. 1932, divorced) Rose Marie Ullmo (m. 1946; div. 1954) Monique Roman (m. 1954; died 2009)
- Children: 2

Education
- Education: University of Paris (DrE, 1948)

Philosophical work
- School: Structuralism
- Institutions: École pratique des hautes études (later École des hautes études en sciences sociales); Collège de France
- Main interests: Anthropology; Society; Linguistics; Kinship
- Notable ideas: Structuralism; Mythography; Structuralist theory of mythology; Culinary triangle; Bricolage; Mytheme; Alliance theory; Floating signifier

Claude Lévi-Strauss (/klɔːd ˈleɪvi ˈstraʊs/ klawd LAY-vee STROWSS; French: [klod levi stʁos]; 28 November 1908 – 30 October 2009) was a French anthropologist and ethnologist whose work was key in the development of the theories of structuralism and structural anthropology. He held the chair of Social Anthropology at the Collège de France between 1959 and 1982, was elected a member of the Académie française in 1973 and was a member of the School for Advanced Studies in the Social Sciences in Paris. He received numerous honors from universities and institutions throughout the world.

Lévi-Strauss argued that the "savage" mind had the same structures as the "civilized" mind and that human characteristics are the same everywhere. These observations culminated in his famous book Tristes Tropiques (1955) which established his position as one of the central figures in the structuralist school of thought. As well as sociology, his ideas reached into many fields in the humanities, including philosophy. Structuralism has been defined as "the search for the underlying patterns of thought in all forms of human activity." He won the 1986 International Nonino Prize in Italy.

== Biography ==
=== Early life and education ===
Gustave Claude Lévi-Strauss was born in 1908 to French-Jewish (turned agnostic) parents who were living in Brussels, where his father was working as a portrait painter at the time. He grew up in Paris, living on a street of the upscale 16th arrondissement named after the artist Claude Lorrain, whose work he admired and later wrote about. During the First World War, from age 6 to 10, he lived with his maternal grandfather, who was the Rabbi of Versailles. Despite his religious environment early on, Claude Lévi-Strauss was an atheist or agnostic, at least in his adult life.

From 1918 to 1925 he studied at Lycée Janson de Sailly high school, receiving a baccalaureate in June 1925 (age of 16). In his last year (1924), he was introduced to philosophy, including the works of Marx and Kant, and began shifting to the political left (however, unlike many other socialists, he never became communist). From 1925, he spent the next two years at the prestigious Lycée Condorcet preparing for the entrance exam to the highly selective École normale supérieure. However, for reasons that are not entirely clear, he decided not to take the exam. In 1926, he went to Sorbonne in Paris, studying law and philosophy, as well as engaging in socialist politics and activism. In 1929, he opted for philosophy over law (which he found boring), and from 1930 to 1931, put politics aside to focus on preparing for the agrégation in philosophy, in order to qualify as a professor. In 1931, he passed the agrégation, coming in 3rd place, and youngest in his class at age 22. By this time, the Great Depression had hit France, and Lévi-Strauss found himself needing to provide not only for himself but his parents as well.

=== Early career ===
In 1935, after a few years of secondary school teaching, he took up a last-minute offer to be part of a French cultural mission to Brazil in which he would serve as a visiting professor of sociology at the University of São Paulo while his then-wife, Dina, served as a visiting professor of ethnology.

The couple lived and did their anthropological work in Brazil from 1935 to 1939. During this time, while he was a visiting professor of sociology, Claude undertook his only ethnographic fieldwork. He accompanied Dina, a trained ethnographer in her own right, who was also a visiting professor at the University of São Paulo, where they conducted research forays into the Mato Grosso and the Amazon rainforest. They first studied the Guaycuru and Bororó Indian tribes, staying among them for a few days. In 1938, they returned for a second, more than half-year-long expedition to study the Nambikwara and Tupi-Kawahib societies. At this time, his wife had an eye infection that prevented her from completing the study, which he concluded. This experience cemented Lévi-Strauss's professional identity as an anthropologist. Edmund Leach suggests, from Lévi-Strauss's own accounts in Tristes Tropiques, that he could not have spent more than a few weeks in any one place and was never able to converse easily with any of his native informants in their native language, which is uncharacteristic of anthropological research methods of participatory interaction with subjects to gain a full understanding of a culture.

In the 1980s, he discussed why he became vegetarian in pieces published in Italian daily newspaper La Repubblica and other publications anthologized in the posthumous book Nous sommes tous des cannibales (2013):

A day will come when the thought that to feed themselves, men of the past raised and massacred living beings and complacently exposed their shredded flesh in displays shall no doubt inspire the same repulsion as that of the travellers of the 16th and 17th century facing cannibal meals of savage American primitives in America, Oceania, Asia or Africa.

==== Expatriation ====
Lévi-Strauss returned to France in 1939 to take part in the war effort and was assigned as a liaison agent to the Maginot Line. After the French capitulation in 1940, he was employed at a lycée in Montpellier, but then was dismissed under the Vichy racial laws (Lévi-Strauss's family, originally from Alsace, was of Jewish ancestry).

Around that time, he and his first wife separated. She stayed behind and worked in the French resistance, while he managed to escape Vichy France by boat to Martinique, from where he was finally able to continue travelling. (Victor Serge describes conversations with Lévi-Strauss aboard the freighter Capitaine Paul-Lemerle from Marseilles to Martinique in his Notebooks.)

In 1941, he was offered a position at the New School for Social Research in New York City and granted admission to the United States. A series of voyages brought him, via South America, to Puerto Rico, where he was investigated by the FBI after German letters in his luggage aroused the suspicions of customs agents. Lévi-Strauss spent most of the war in New York City. Along with Jacques Maritain, Henri Focillon, and Roman Jakobson, he was a founding member of the École Libre des Hautes Études, a sort of university-in-exile for French academics.

The war years in New York were formative for Lévi-Strauss in several ways. His relationship with Jakobson helped shape his theoretical outlook (Jakobson and Lévi-Strauss are considered to be two of the central figures on which structuralist thought is based). In addition, Lévi-Strauss was also exposed to the American anthropology espoused by Franz Boas, who taught at Columbia University. In 1942, while having dinner at the Faculty House at Columbia, Boas died in Lévi-Strauss's arms. This intimate association with Boas gave his early work a distinctive American inclination that helped facilitate its acceptance in the U.S.

After a brief stint from 1946 to 1947 as a cultural attaché to the French embassy in Washington, DC, Lévi-Strauss returned to Paris in 1948. At this time, he received his state doctorate from the Sorbonne by submitting, in the French tradition, both a "major" and a "minor" doctoral thesis. These were La vie familiale et sociale des indiens Nambikwara (The Family and Social Life of the Nambikwara Indians) and Les structures élémentaires de la parenté (The Elementary Structures of Kinship).

=== Later life and death ===
In 2008, he became the first member of the Académie française to reach the age of 100 and one of the few living authors to have his works published in the Bibliothèque de la Pléiade. On the death of Maurice Druon on 14 April 2009, he became the dean of the Académie, its longest-serving member.

Lévi-Strauss died in Paris on 30 October 2009, at the age of 100. His death was announced four days later.

French President Nicolas Sarkozy described him as "one of the greatest ethnologists of all time". Bernard Kouchner, the French Foreign Minister, said Lévi-Strauss "broke with an ethnocentric vision of history and humanity ... At a time when we are trying to give meaning to globalization, to build a fairer and more humane world, I would like Claude Lévi-Strauss's universal echo to resonate more strongly". In a similar vein, a statement by Lévi-Strauss was broadcast on National Public Radio in the remembrance produced by All Things Considered on 3 November 2009: "There is today a frightful disappearance of living species, be they plants or animals. And it's clear that the density of human beings has become so great, if I can say so, that they have begun to poison themselves. And the world which I am finishing my existence is no longer a world that I like." The Daily Telegraph said in its obituary that Lévi-Strauss was "one of the dominating postwar influences in French intellectual life and the leading exponent of Structuralism in the social sciences". Permanent secretary of the Académie française Hélène Carrère d'Encausse said: "He was a thinker, a philosopher.... We will not find another like him".

== Career and development of structural anthropology ==
The Elementary Structures of Kinship was published in 1949 and quickly came to be regarded as one of the most important anthropological works on kinship. It was even reviewed favorably by Simone de Beauvoir, who saw it as an important statement of the position of women in non-Western cultures. A play on the title of Durkheim's famous Elementary Forms of the Religious Life, Lévi-Strauss' Elementary Structures re-examined how people organized their families by examining the logical structures that underlay relationships rather than their contents. While British anthropologists such as Alfred Reginald Radcliffe-Brown argued that kinship was based on descent from a common ancestor, Lévi-Strauss argued that kinship was based on the alliance between two families that formed when women from one group married men from another.

Throughout the late 1940s and early 1950s, Lévi-Strauss continued to publish and experienced considerable professional success. On his return to France, he became involved with the administration of the CNRS and the Musée de l'Homme before finally becoming a professor (directeur d'études) of the fifth section of the École Pratique des Hautes Études, the 'Religious Sciences' section where Marcel Mauss was previously professor, the title of which chair he renamed "Comparative Religion of Non-Literate Peoples".

While Lévi-Strauss was well known in academic circles, in 1955 he became one of France's best-known intellectuals by publishing Tristes Tropiques in Paris that year by Plon (best-known translated into English in 1973, published by Penguin). Essentially, this book was a memoir detailing his time as a French expatriate throughout the 1930s and his travels. Lévi-Strauss combined exquisitely beautiful prose, dazzling philosophical meditation, and ethnographic analysis of the Amazonian peoples to produce a masterpiece. The organizers of the Prix Goncourt, for instance, lamented that they were not able to award Lévi-Strauss the prize because Tristes Tropiques was nonfiction.

Lévi-Strauss was named to a chair in social anthropology at the Collège de France in 1959. At roughly the same time he published Structural Anthropology, a collection of his essays that provided both examples and programmatic statements about structuralism. At the same time as he was laying the groundwork for an intellectual program, he began a series of institutions to establish anthropology as a discipline in France, including the Laboratory for Social Anthropology where new students could be trained, and a new journal, l'Homme, for publishing the results of their research.

== The Savage Mind ==
In 1962, Lévi-Strauss published what is for many people his most important work, La Pensée sauvage, translated into English as The Savage Mind (and later as Wild Thought). The French title is an untranslatable pun, as the word pensée means both 'thought' and 'pansy', while sauvage has a range of meanings different from English 'savage'. Lévi-Strauss supposedly suggested that the English title be Pansies for Thought, borrowing from a speech by Ophelia in Shakespeare's Hamlet (Act IV, Scene V). French editions of La Pensée Sauvage are often printed with an image of wild pansies on the cover.

The Savage Mind discusses not just "primitive" thought, a category defined by previous anthropologists, but also forms of thought common to all human beings. The first half of the book lays out Lévi-Strauss's theory of culture and mind, while the second half expands this account into a theory of history and social change. This latter part of the book engaged Lévi-Strauss in a heated debate with Jean-Paul Sartre over the nature of human freedom. On the one hand, Sartre's existentialist philosophy committed him to a position that human beings fundamentally were free to act as they pleased. On the other hand, Sartre also was a leftist who was committed to ideas such as that individuals were constrained by the ideologies imposed on them by the powerful. Lévi-Strauss presented his structuralist notion of agency in opposition to Sartre. Echoes of this debate between structuralism and existentialism eventually inspired the work of younger authors such as Pierre Bourdieu.

== Mythologiques ==
Now a worldwide celebrity, Lévi-Strauss spent the second half of the 1960s working on his master project, a four-volume study called Mythologiques. In it, he followed a single myth from the tip of South America and all of its variations from group to group north through Central America and eventually into the Arctic Circle, thus tracing the myth's cultural evolution from one end of the Western Hemisphere to the other. He accomplished this in a typically structuralist way, examining the underlying structure of relationships among the elements of the story rather than focusing on the content of the story itself. While Pensée Sauvage was a statement of Lévi-Strauss's big-picture theory, Mythologiques was an extended, four-volume example of analysis. Richly detailed and extremely long, it is less widely read than the much shorter and more accessible Pensée Sauvage, despite its position as Lévi-Strauss's masterwork.

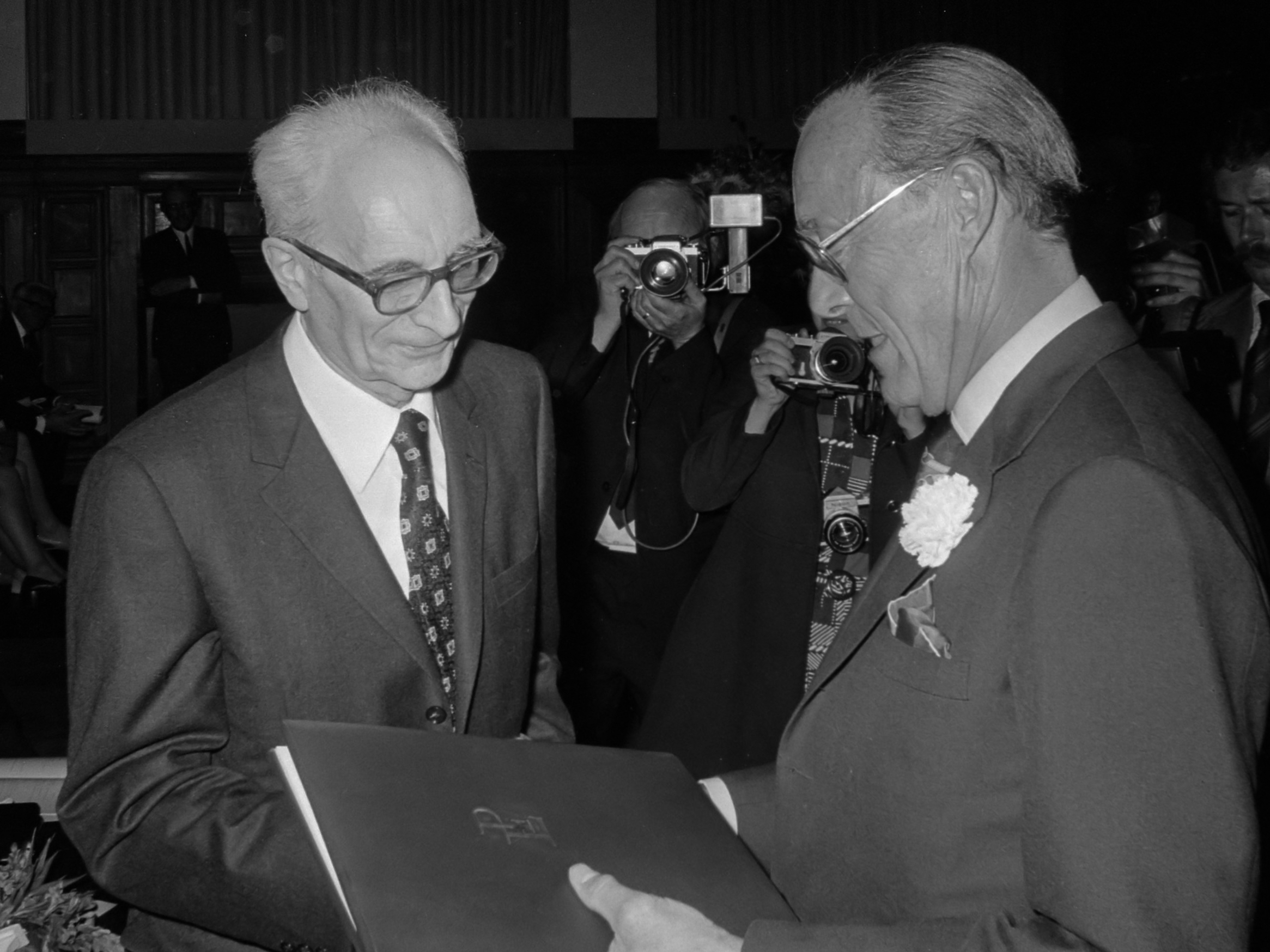
Claude Lévi-Strauss receiving the Erasmus Prize from the hands of Prince Bernhard of the Netherlands (1973)

Lévi-Strauss completed the final volume of Mythologiques in 1971. On 14 May 1973, he was elected to the Académie française, France's highest honour for a writer. He was a member of other notable academies worldwide, including the American Academy of Arts and Letters. In 1956, he became foreign member of the Royal Netherlands Academy of Arts and Sciences. He then became a member of the American Philosophical Society in 1960 and the United States National Academy of Sciences in 1967. He received the Erasmus Prize in 1973, the Meister-Eckhart-Prize for philosophy in 2003, and several honorary doctorates from universities such as Oxford, Harvard, Yale, and Columbia. He also was the recipient of the Grand-croix de la Légion d'honneur, was a Commandeur de l'ordre national du Mérite, and Commandeur des Arts et des Lettres. In 2005, he received the XVII Premi Internacional Catalunya (Generalitat of Catalonia). After his retirement, he continued to publish occasional meditations on art, music, philosophy, and poetry.

== Anthropological theories ==
Lévi-Strauss sought to apply the structural linguistics of Ferdinand de Saussure to anthropology. At the time, the family was traditionally considered the fundamental object of analysis but was seen primarily as a self-contained unit consisting of a husband, a wife, and their children. Nephews, cousins, aunts, uncles, and grandparents all were treated as secondary. Lévi-Strauss argued that akin to Saussure's notion of linguistic value, families acquire determinate identities only through relations with one another. Thus, he inverted the classical view of anthropology, putting the secondary family members first and insisting on analyzing the relations between units instead of the units themselves.

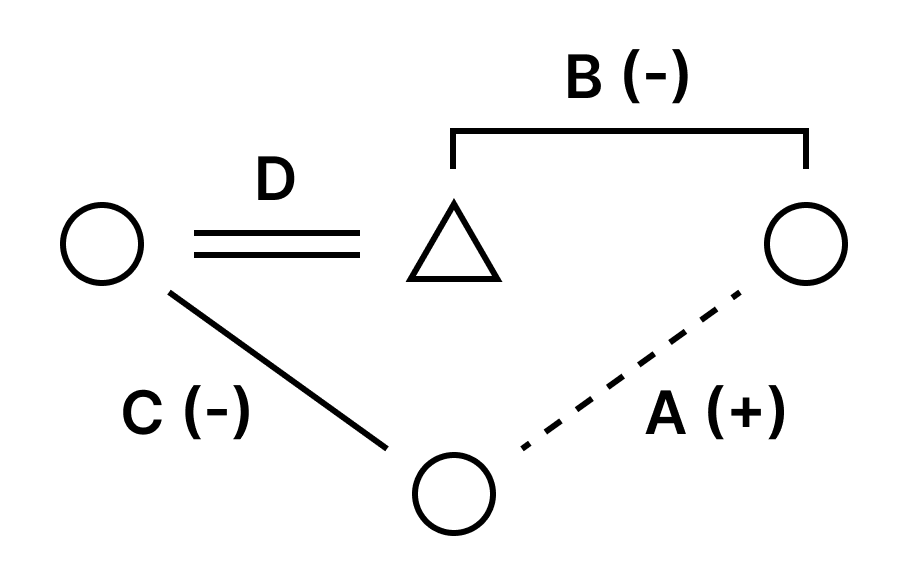
A diagram illustrating Lévi-Strauss's theory of kinship. In such a case, one can infer that D is positive.

In his own analysis of the formation of the identities that arise through marriages between tribes, Lévi-Strauss noted that the relation between the uncle and the nephew was to the relation between brother and sister, as the relation between father and son is to that between husband and wife, that is, A is to B as C is to D. Therefore, if we know A, B, and C, we can predict D. An example of this law is illustrated in the diagram. The four relation units are marked with A to D. Lévi-Strauss noted that if A is positive, B is negative, and C is negative, then it can inferred that D is positive, thereby satisfying the constraint 'A is to B as C is to D'; in this case, the relations are contrasting. The goal of Lévi-Strauss's structural anthropology, then, was to simplify the masses of empirical data into generalized, comprehensible relations between units, which allow for predictive laws to be identified, such as A is to B as C is to D.

Lévi-Strauss's theory is set forth in Structural Anthropology (1958). Briefly, he considers culture a system of symbolic communication, to be investigated with methods that others have used more narrowly in the discussion of novels, political speeches, sports, and movies. His reasoning makes the best sense when contrasted against the background of an earlier generation's social theory. He wrote about this relationship for decades.

A preference for "functionalist" explanations dominated the social sciences from the turn of the 20th century through the 1950s, which is to say that anthropologists and sociologists tried to state the purpose of a social act or institution. The existence of a thing was explained, if it fulfilled a function. The only strong alternative to that kind of analysis was a historical explanation, accounting for the existence of a social fact by stating how it came to be.

The idea of social function developed in two different ways, however. The English anthropologist Alfred Reginald Radcliffe-Brown, who had read and admired the work of the French sociologist Émile Durkheim, argued that the goal of anthropological research was to find the collective function, such as what a religious creed or a set of rules about marriage did for the social order as a whole. Behind this approach was an old idea, the view that civilization developed through a series of phases from the primitive to the modern, everywhere in the same manner. All of the activities in a given kind of society would partake of the same character; some sort of internal logic would cause one level of culture to evolve into the next. On this view, a society can easily be thought of as an organism, the parts functioning together as do the parts of a body. In contrast, the more influential functionalism of Bronisław Malinowski described the satisfaction of individual needs, what a person derived by participating in a custom.

In the United States, where the shape of anthropology was set by the German-educated Franz Boas, the preference was for historical accounts. This approach had obvious problems, which Lévi-Strauss praises Boas for facing squarely. Historical information seldom is available for non-literate cultures. The anthropologist fills in with comparisons to other cultures and is forced to rely on theories that have no evidential basis, the old notion of universal stages of development or the claim that cultural resemblances are based on some unrecognized past contact between groups. Boas came to believe that no overall pattern in social development could be proven; for him, there was no single history, only histories.

There are three broad choices involved in the divergence of these schools; each had to decide:

1. what kind of evidence to use;
2. whether to emphasize the particulars of a single culture or look for patterns underlying all societies; and
3. what the source of any underlying patterns might be, the definition of common humanity.

Social scientists in all traditions relied on cross-cultural studies, as it was always necessary to supplement information about a society with information about others. Thus, some idea of a common human nature was implicit in each approach. The critical distinction, then, remained twofold:

- Does a social fact exist because it is functional for the social order, or because it is functional for the person?
- Do uniformities across cultures occur because of organizational needs that must be met everywhere, or because of the uniform needs of human personality?

For Lévi-Strauss, the choice was for the demands of the social order. He had no difficulty bringing out the inconsistencies and triviality of individualistic accounts. Malinowski said, for example, that magic beliefs come into being when people need to feel a sense of control over events when the outcome is uncertain. In the Trobriand Islands, he found proof of this claim in the rites surrounding abortions and weaving skirts. But in the same tribes, there is no magic attached to making clay pots even though it is no more certain a business than weaving. So, the explanation is not consistent. Furthermore, these explanations tend to be used in an ad hoc, superficial way – one postulates a trait of personality when needed. However, the accepted way of discussing organizational function did not work either. Different societies might have institutions that were similar in many obvious ways and yet, served different functions. Many tribal cultures divide the tribe into two groups and have elaborate rules about how the two groups may interact. However, exactly what they may do—trade, intermarry—is different in different tribes; for that matter, so are the criteria for distinguishing the groups. Nor will it do to say that dividing in two is a universal need of organizations, because there are a lot of tribes that thrive without it.

For Lévi-Strauss, the methods of linguistics became a model for all his earlier examinations of society. His analogies usually are from phonology (though also later from music, mathematics, chaos theory, cybernetics, and so on). "A really scientific analysis must be real, simplifying, and explanatory," he writes. Phonemic analysis reveals features that are real, in the sense that users of the language can recognize and respond to them. At the same time, a phoneme is an abstraction from language – not a sound, but a category of sound defined by the way it is distinguished from other categories through rules unique to the language. The entire sound structure of a language may be generated from a relatively small number of rules.

In the study of the kinship systems that first concerned him, this ideal of explanation allowed a comprehensive organization of data that partly had been ordered by other researchers. The overall goal was to find out why family relations differed among various South American cultures. The father might have great authority over the son in one group, for example, with the relationship rigidly restricted by taboos. In another group, the mother's brother would have that kind of relationship with the son, while the father's relationship was relaxed and playful.

A number of partial patterns had been noted. Relations between the mother and father, for example, had some sort of reciprocity with those of father and son – if the mother had a dominant social status and was formal with the father, for example, then the father usually had close relations with the son. But these smaller patterns joined in inconsistent ways. One possible way of finding a master order was to rate all the positions in a kinship system along several dimensions. For example, the father was older than the son, the father produced the son, the father had the same sex as the son, and so on; the matrilineal uncle was older and of the same sex, but did not produce the son, and so on. An exhaustive collection of such observations might cause an overall pattern to emerge.

However, for Lévi-Strauss, this kind of work was considered "analytical in appearance only". It results in a chart that is far more difficult to understand than the original data and is based on arbitrary abstractions (empirically, fathers are older than sons, but it is only the researcher who declares that this feature explains their relations). Furthermore, it does not explain anything. The explanation it offers is tautological—if age is crucial, then age explains a relationship. And it does not offer the possibility of inferring the origins of the structure.

A proper solution to the puzzle is to find a basic unit of kinship which can explain all the variations. It is a cluster of four roles – brother, sister, father, son. These are the roles that must be involved in any society that has an incest taboo requiring a man to obtain a wife from some man outside his own hereditary line. A brother may give away his sister, for example, whose son might reciprocate in the next generation by allowing his sister to marry exogamously. The underlying demand is a continued circulation of women to keep various clans peacefully related.

Right or wrong, this solution displays the qualities of structural thinking. Even though Lévi-Strauss frequently speaks of treating culture as the product of the axioms and corollaries that underlie it, or the phonemic differences that constitute it, he is concerned with the objective data of field research. He notes that it is logically possible for a different atom of kinship structure to exist–sister, sister's brother, brother's wife, daughter – but there are no real-world examples of relationships that can be derived from that grouping. The trouble with this view has been shown by Australian anthropologist Augustus Elkin, who insisted on the point that in a four-class marriage system, the preferred marriage was with a classificatory mother's brother's daughter and never with the true one. Lévi-Strauss's atom of kinship structure deals only with consanguineal kin. There is a big difference between the two situations, in that the kinship structure involving the classificatory kin relations allows for the building of a system which can bring together thousands of people. Lévi-Strauss's atom of kinship stops working once the true MoBrDa is missing. Lévi-Strauss also developed the concept of the house society to describe those societies where the domestic unit is more central to the social organization than the descent group or lineage.

The purpose of structuralist explanation is to organize real data in the simplest effective way. All science, he says, is either structuralist or reductionist. In confronting such matters as the incest taboo, one is facing an objective limit of what the human mind has accepted so far. One could hypothesize some biological imperative underlying it, but so far as social order is concerned, the taboo has the effect of an irreducible fact. The social scientist can only work with the structures of human thought that arise from it. And structural explanations can be tested and refuted. A mere analytic scheme that wishes causal relations into existence is not structuralist in this sense.

Lévi-Strauss's later works are more controversial, in part because they impinge on the subject matter of other scholars. He believed that modern life and all history were founded on the same categories and transformations that he had discovered in the Brazilian backcountry—The Raw and the Cooked, From Honey to Ashes, The Naked Man (to borrow some titles from the Mythologiques). For instance, he compares anthropology to musical serialism and defends his "philosophical" approach. He also pointed out that the modern view of primitive cultures was simplistic in denying them a history. The categories of myth did not persist among them because nothing had happened–it was easy to find the evidence of defeat, migration, exile, and repeated displacements of all the kinds known to recorded history. Instead, the mythic categories had encompassed these changes.

He argued for a view of human life as existing in two timelines simultaneously, the eventful one of history and the long cycles in which one set of fundamental mythic patterns dominates and then perhaps another. In this respect, his work resembles that of Fernand Braudel, the historian of the Mediterranean and 'la longue durée,' the cultural outlook and forms of social organization that persisted for centuries around that sea. He is right in that history is difficult to build up in a non-literate society, nevertheless, Jean Guiart's anthropological and José Garanger's archaeological work in central Vanuatu, bringing to the fore the skeletons of former chiefs described in local myths, who had thus been living persons, shows that there can be some means of ascertaining the history of some groups which otherwise would be deemed a historical. Another issue is the experience that the same person can tell one a myth highly charged in symbols, and some years later a sort of chronological history claiming to be chronic of a descent line (e.g., in the Loyalty islands and New Zealand), the two texts having in common that they each deal in topographical detail with the land-tenure claims of the said descent line (see Douglas Oliver on the Siwai in Bougainville). Lévi-Strauss would agree to these aspects be explained inside his seminar but would never touch them on his own. The anthropological data content of the myths was not his problem. He was only interested in the formal aspects of each story, considered by him as the result of the workings of the collective unconscious of each group, which idea was taken from the linguists, but cannot be proved in any way although he was adamant about its existence and would never accept any discussion on this point.

== Structuralist approach to myth ==
Similar to his anthropological theories, Lévi-Strauss identified myths as a type of speech through which a language could be discovered. His work is a structuralist theory of mythology which attempted to explain how seemingly fantastical and arbitrary tales could be so similar across cultures. Because he had the belief that there was no one "authentic" version of a myth, rather that they were all manifestations of the same language, he sought to find the fundamental units of myth, namely, the mytheme. Lévi-Strauss broke each of the versions of a myth down into a series of sentences, consisting of a relation between a function and a subject. Sentences with the same function were given the same number and bundled together. These are mythemes.

What Lévi-Strauss believed he had discovered when he examined the relations between mythemes was that a myth consists of juxtaposed binary oppositions. Oedipus, for example, consists of the overrating of blood relations and the underrating of blood relations, the autochthonous origin of humans, and the denial of their autochthonous origin. Influenced by Hegel, Lévi-Strauss believed that the human mind thinks fundamentally in these binary oppositions and their unification (the thesis, antithesis, synthesis triad), and that these are what makes meaning possible. Furthermore, he considered the job of myth to be a sleight of hand, an association of an irreconcilable binary opposition with a reconcilable binary opposition, creating the illusion, or belief, that the former had been resolved.

Lévi-Strauss sees a basic paradox in the study of myth. On one hand, mythical stories are fantastic and unpredictable: the content of myth seems completely arbitrary. On the other hand, the myths of different cultures are surprisingly similar:

On the one hand it would seem that in the course of a myth anything is likely to happen. ... But on the other hand, this apparent arbitrariness is belied by the astounding similarity between myths collected in widely different regions. Therefore the problem: If the content of myth is contingent [i.e., arbitrary], how are we to explain the fact that myths throughout the world are so similar?

Lévi-Strauss proposed that universal laws must govern mythical thought and resolve this seeming paradox, producing similar myths in different cultures. Each myth may seem unique, but he proposed it is just one particular instance of a universal law of human thought. In studying myth, Lévi-Strauss tries "to reduce apparently arbitrary data to some kind of order, and to attain a level at which a kind of necessity becomes apparent, underlying the illusions of liberty." Laurie suggests that for Levi-Strauss, "operations embedded within animal myths provide opportunities to resolve collective problems of classification and hierarchy, marking lines between the inside and the outside, the Law and its exceptions, those who belong and those who do not."

According to Lévi-Strauss, "mythical thought always progresses from the awareness of oppositions toward their resolution." In other words, myths consist of:

1. elements that oppose or contradict each other and
2. other elements that "mediate", or resolve, those oppositions.

For example, Lévi-Strauss thinks the trickster of many Native American mythologies acts as a "mediator". Lévi-Strauss's argument hinges on two facts about the Native American trickster:

1. the trickster has a contradictory and unpredictable personality;
2. the trickster is almost always a raven or a coyote.

Lévi-Strauss argues that the raven and coyote "mediate" the opposition between life and death. The relationship between agriculture and hunting is analogous to the opposition between life and death: agriculture is solely concerned with producing life (at least up until harvest time); hunting is concerned with producing death. Furthermore, the relationship between herbivores and beasts of prey is analogous to the relationship between agriculture and hunting: like agriculture, herbivores are concerned with plants; like hunting, beasts of prey are concerned with catching meat. Lévi-Strauss points out that the raven and coyote eat carrion and are therefore halfway between herbivores and beasts of prey: like beasts of prey, they eat meat; like herbivores, they do not catch their food. Thus, he argues, "we have a mediating structure of the following type":

By uniting herbivore traits with traits of beasts of prey, the raven and coyote somewhat reconcile herbivores and beasts of prey: in other words, they mediate the opposition between herbivores and beasts of prey. As we have seen, this opposition ultimately is analogous to the opposition between life and death. Therefore, the raven and coyote ultimately mediate the opposition between life and death. This, Lévi-Strauss believes, explains why the coyote and raven have contradictory personalities when they appear as the mythical trickster:

The trickster is a mediator. Since his mediating function occupies a position halfway between two polar terms, he must retain something of that duality—namely an ambiguous and equivocal character.

Because the raven and coyote reconcile profoundly opposed concepts (i.e., life and death), their own mythical personalities must reflect this duality or contradiction: in other words, they must have a contradictory, "tricky" personality.

This theory about the structure of myth helps support Lévi-Strauss's more basic theory about human thought. According to this more basic theory, universal laws govern all areas of human thought:

If it were possible to prove in this instance, too, that the apparent arbitrariness of the mind, its supposedly spontaneous flow of inspiration, and its seemingly uncontrolled inventiveness [are ruled by] laws operating at a deeper level...if the human mind appears determined even in the realm of mythology, a fortiori it must also be determined in all its spheres of activity.

Out of all the products of culture, myths seem the most fantastic and unpredictable. Therefore, Lévi-Strauss claims, that if even mythical thought obeys universal laws, then all human thought must obey universal laws.

== The Savage Mind: bricoleur and engineer ==
Lévi-Strauss developed the comparison of the Bricoleur and Engineer in The Savage Mind.

Bricoleur has its origin in the old French verb bricoler, which originally referred to extraneous movements in ball games, billiards, hunting, shooting and riding, but which today means do-it-yourself building or repairing things with the tools and materials on hand, puttering or tinkering as it were. In comparison to the true craftsman, whom Lévi-Strauss calls the Engineer, the Bricoleur is adept at many tasks and at putting preexisting things together in new ways, adapting his project to a finite stock of materials and tools.

The Engineer deals with projects in their entirety, conceiving and procuring all the necessary materials and tools to suit his project. The Bricoleur approximates "the savage mind" and the Engineer approximates the scientific mind. Lévi-Strauss says that the universe of the Bricoleur is closed, and he often is forced to make do with whatever is at hand, whereas the universe of the Engineer is open in that he is able to create new tools and materials. However, both live within a restrictive reality, and so the Engineer is forced to consider the preexisting set of theoretical and practical knowledge, of technical means, in a similar way to the Bricoleur.

=== Criticism ===
Lévi-Strauss's theory on the origin of the Trickster has been criticized on a number of points by anthropologists.

Stanley Diamond notes that while the secular civilized often consider the concepts of life and death to be polar, primitive cultures often see them "as aspects of a single condition, the condition of existence." Diamond remarks that Lévi-Strauss did not reach such a conclusion by inductive reasoning, but simply by working backwards from the evidence to the "a priori mediated concepts" of "life" and "death", which he reached by assumption of a necessary progression from "life" to "agriculture" to "herbivorous animals", and from "death" to "warfare" to "beasts of prey". For that matter, the coyote is well known to hunt in addition to scavenging and the raven also has been known to act as a bird of prey, in contrast to Lévi-Strauss's conception. Nor does that conception explain why a scavenger such as a bear would never appear as the Trickster. Diamond further remarks that "the Trickster names 'raven' and 'coyote' which Lévi-Strauss explains can be arrived at with greater economy on the basis of, let us say, the cleverness of the animals involved, their ubiquity, elusiveness, capacity to make mischief, their undomesticated reflection of certain human traits." Finally, Lévi-Strauss's analysis does not appear to be capable of explaining why representations of the Trickster in other areas of the world make use of such animals as the spider and mantis.

Edmund Leach wrote that "The outstanding characteristic of his writing, whether in French or English, is that it is difficult to understand; his sociological theories combine baffling complexity with overwhelming erudition. Some readers even suspect that they are being treated to a confidence trick." Sociologist Stanislav Andreski criticized Lévi-Strauss's work generally, arguing that his scholarship was often sloppy and moreover that much of his mystique and reputation stemmed from his "threatening people with mathematics", a reference to Lévi-Strauss's use of quasi-algebraic equations to explain his ideas. Drawing on postcolonial approaches to anthropology, Timothy Laurie has suggested that "Lévi-Strauss speaks from the vantage point of a State intent on securing knowledge for the purposes of, as he himself would often claim, salvaging local cultures...but the salvation workers also ascribe to themselves legitimacy and authority in the process."

== Personal life ==
He married Dina Dreyfus in 1932. They later divorced. He was then married to Rose Marie Ullmo from 1946 to 1954. They had one son, Laurent. His third and last wife was Monique Roman; they were married in 1954. They had one son, Matthieu.

== Honours and tributes ==
Ribbon bar	Country	Honour
	France	Grand Cross of the National Order of the Legion of Honour
	France	Commandeur of the National Order of Merit
	France	Commander of the Ordre des Palmes Académiques
	France	Commander of the Ordre des Arts et des Lettres
	Belgium	Commander of the Order of the Crown
	Brazil	Commander of the Order of the Southern Cross
	Brazil	Grand cross of the National Order of Scientific Merit
ribbon bar	Japan	Grand cross of the Order of the Rising Sun

== Works ==
- 1926. Gracchus Babeuf et le communisme. L'églantine.
- 1948. La Vie familiale et sociale des Indiens Nambikwara. Paris: Société des Américanistes.
- 1949. Les Structures élémentaires de la parenté
  - The Elementary Structures of Kinship, translated by J. H. Bell, J. R. von Sturmer, and R. Needham. 1969.
- 1952. Race et histoire, (as part of the series The Race Question in Modern Science). UNESCO.
- 1955. "The Structural Study of Myth." Journal of American Folklore 68(270):428–44.
- 1955. Tristes Tropiques ['Sad Tropics'],
  - A World on the Wane, translated by J. Weightman and D. Weightman. 1973.
- 1958. Anthropologie structurale
  - Structural Anthropology, translated by C. Jacobson and B. G. Schoepf. 1963.
- 1962. Le Totemisme aujourdhui
  - Totemism, translated by R. Needham. 1963.
- 1962. La Pensée sauvage
  - The Savage Mind. 1966.
- 1964–1971. Mythologiques I–IV, translated by J. Weightman and D. Weightman.
  - 1964. Le Cru et le cuit (The Raw and the Cooked, 1969)
  - 1966. Du miel aux cendres (From Honey to Ashes, 1973)
  - 1968. L'Origine des manières de table (The Origin of Table Manners, 1978)
  - 1971. L'Homme nu (The Naked Man, 1981)
- 1973. Anthropologie structurale deux
  - Structural Anthropology, Vol. II, translated by M. Layton. 1976
- 1975. La Voie des masques
  - The Way of the Masks, translated by S. Modelski, 1982.
- Lévi-Strauss, Claude (2005), Myth and Meaning, First published 1978 by Routledge & Kegan Paul, U.K, Taylor & Francis Group, ISBN 0-415-25548-1
- 1978. Myth and Meaning. UK: Routledge & Kegan Paul.
- 1983. Le Regard éloigné
  - The View from Afar, translated by J. Neugroschel and P. Hoss. 1985.
- 1984. Paroles donnés
  - Anthropology and Myth: Lectures, 1951–1982, translated by R. Willis. 1987.
- 1985. La Potière jalouse
  - The Jealous Potter, translated by B. Chorier. 1988.
- 1991. Histoire de Lynx
  - The Story of Lynx, translated by C. Tihanyi. 1996.
- 1993. Regarder, écouter, lire
  - Look, Listen, Read, translated by B. Singer. 1997.
- 1994. Saudades do Brasil. Paris: Plon.
- 1994. Le Père Noël supplicié. Pin-Balma: Sables Éditions.
- 2011. L'Anthropologie face aux problèmes du monde moderne. Paris: Seuil.
- 2011. L'Autre face de la lune, Paris: Seuil.

=== Interviews ===
- 1978. "Comment travaillent les écrivains," interviewed by Jean-Louis de Rambures. Paris.
- 1988. "De près et de loin," interviewed by Didier Eribon (Conversations with Claude Lévi-Strauss, trans. Paula Wissing, 1991)
- 2005. "Loin du Brésil," interviewed by Véronique Mortaigne, Paris, Chandeigne.

== See also ==
- Alliance theory
- Comparative mythology
- Evolutionary Principle
- List of important publications in anthropology
- Little Arpad
