= Adam (disambiguation) =

Adam is a holy figure in the Abrahamic religions who is seen as the first human created by God.

Adam may also refer to:

- Adam (given name)
- Adam (surname)
- Adam (murder victim), the name police gave to an unidentified male child whose torso was discovered in the River Thames in London
- Adamu (Assyrian king), the earliest Assyrian king of Middle East. He may be the inspiration for Adam.

== Arts ==
- Adam style or Adamesque, a style of interior decoration with elaborate plasterwork after three Scottish brothers
- Adam@home (previously titled Adam) newspaper comic strip, by Brian Basset and Rob Harrell

=== Books ===
- Adam, a 1960 novel by David Bolt
- Adam (novel), a 2008 novel by author Ted Dekker
- Adam, a 2014 novel by Ariel Schrag
- Adam, a character in the Japanese manga Record of Ragnarok

=== Film and television ===
- Adam (1983 film), an American drama television film
- Adam (1992 film), a British stop-motion animation film
- Adam (2009 film), an American romance film
- Adam (2019 American film), an American comedy film
- Adam (2019 Moroccan film), a Moroccan film
- Adam (2020 film), an American drama film
- Adam (2027 film), a Polish biographical film based on the life of Adam Małysz
- "Adam" (QI), a 2003 television episode
- "Adam" (Torchwood), a 2008 television episode

=== Music ===
- Adam (composer), a French composer of the 15th century
- Adam (musical), a 1983 musical by Richard Ahlert about Adam Clayton Powell Jr.
- Adam (album) , a 2026 album by Adam Lambert

=== Sculpture ===
- Adam (Lombardo), a c. 1490–1495 marble sculpture by Tullio Lombardo
- Adam (Rodin), an 1880–81 sculpture by Auguste Rodin
- Adam (Bourdelle), an 1889 bronze sculpture by Antoine Bourdelle
- Adam, a 1938–39 colossal sculpture of a head by Jacob Epstein

== Companies ==
- Adam Air, a former Indonesian airline
- Adam Aircraft Industries, an aircraft manufacturer
- Adam and Company, a private bank in the UK
- ADAM Audio, a German loudspeaker manufacturer
- Adam Hats, an American hat company
- A.D.A.M., Inc., a health information company
- Adam Internet, an Australian Internet service provider
- Adam Motor Company, a defunct Pakistani automobile manufacturer
- Adam VIII, a record label

== Places ==
- Adam, Oman, a town in Oman
- Adam, Russia, several rural localities in the Udmurt Republic, Russia
- Adam, West Virginia, an unincorporated community in West Virginia, US
- Adam, alternative name of Geva Binyamin, an Israeli settlement in the West Bank
- Adam, a village in Drăguşeni Commune, Galaţi County, Romania
- Adam Range, a mountain range in Nunavut, Canada
- City of Adam, a city mentioned in the Book of Joshua in the Bible

== Science ==
- ADAM (protein), a family of peptidase proteins
- ADAM complex (amniotic deformity, adhesions and mutilations) or amniotic band constriction, a congenital disorder
- Y-chromosomal Adam, patrilineal most recent common ancestor
- Audit Data Analysis and Mining, an intrusion detection system
- Adam, a Robot Scientist
- Adam (tree), a giant sequoia tree in California

== Technology ==
- Coleco Adam, an early home computer
- Adam tablet, a tablet computer from Notion Ink
- Active Directory Application Mode, the previous name for Microsoft's Active Directory Lightweight Director Service
- Opel Adam, a car
- Area Defense Anti-Munitions, an experimental weapons system being developed by Lockheed Martin
- Area Denial Artillery Munition, a family of US anti-personnel landmines and their carrier artillery shells
- Adam (optimization algorithm), an optimization algorithm for deep learning
- ADAM Program, used to help find missing children in the United States

== U.S. government programs ==
- Arrestee Drug Abuse Monitoring, a US drug-abuse-monitoring program
- Code Adam, used in the US to alert the public of missing children

== Other uses ==
- Adam (drug), a street name for MDMA/ecstasy
- Adam (beverage), meaning water

== See also ==
- Saint Adam (disambiguation)
- Adams (disambiguation)
- Adem (disambiguation)
- Aadmi (disambiguation)
- Adamjee (disambiguation)
