= Arguments for and against drug prohibition =

Commonly-cited arguments for and against the prohibition of drugs include the following:

== Efficiency ==
=== Arguments that drug laws are effective ===
Supporters of prohibition claim that drug laws have a successful track record suppressing illicit drug use since they were introduced in the 1910s. The licit drug alcohol has current (last 12 months) user rates as high as 80–90% in populations over 14 years of age, and tobacco has historically had current use rates up to 60% of adult populations, yet the percentages currently using illicit drugs in OECD countries are generally below 1% of the population excepting cannabis where most are between 3% and 10%, with six countries between 11% and 17%.

In the 50-year period following the first 1912 international convention restricting use of opium, heroin and cocaine, the United States' use of illicit drugs other than cannabis was consistently below 0.5% of the population, with cannabis rising to 1–2% of the population between 1955 and 1965. With the advent of the counter-culture movement from the late 1950s, where illicit drug use was promoted as mind-expanding and relatively harmless, illicit drug use rose sharply. With illicit drug use peaking in the 1970s in the United States, the "Just Say No" campaign, initiated under the patronage of Nancy Reagan, coincided with recent (past month) illicit drug use decreases from 14.1% in 1979 to 5.8% in 1992, a drop of 60%.

In March, 2007, Antonio Maria Costa, former executive director of the United Nations Office on Drugs and Crime, drew attention to the drug policy of Sweden, arguing:

Sweden is an excellent example. Drug use is just a third of the European average while spending on drug control is three times the EU average. For three decades, (Note: There were changes of course to the drug policy of Sweden prior to the period to which, on both sides of the argument, Antonio Maria Costa and Henrik Tham refer. For example, the Narcotics Penal Act of 1968 increased the maximum penalty for a grave drug offence from one to four years. It was increased again in 1969 to maximum six years (both in the Narcotics Penal Act and in the Smuggling Penal Act). The aim was to permit notable penalties for profiteers taking advantage of the inexperience, curiosity or drug dependence of others. In 1972, maximum punishment for gross offences was increased from 6 to 10 years in order to achieve parity with Finnish, Norwegian and West German law. This increase was intended to affect only the most dangerous criminals. – Source: Bogdan, Michael (1977). Reflections on some international and Swedish legal rules relating to drug offences, pages 1–20, note 46 Archived 2007-12-11 at the Wayback Machine.) Sweden has had consistent and coherent drug-control policies, regardless of which party is in power. There is a strong emphasis on prevention, drug laws have been progressively tightened, and extensive treatment and rehabilitation opportunities are available to users. The police take drug crime seriously. Governments and societies must keep their nerve and avoid being swayed by misguided notions of tolerance. They must not lose sight of the fact that illicit drugs are dangerous – that is why the world agreed to restrict them.

— Antonio Maria Costa, executive director of UNODC (March 2007). "Cannabis... call it anything but 'soft'", The Independent (UK).

In Europe as of 2007, Sweden spends the second highest percentage of GDP, after the Netherlands, on drug control. The UNODC argues that when Sweden reduced spending on education and rehabilitation in the 1990s in a context of higher youth unemployment and declining GDP growth, illicit drug use rose but restoring expenditure from 2002 again sharply decreased drug use as student surveys indicate. In 1998, a poll run by SIFO of 1,000 Swedes found that 96% wanted stronger action by government to stop drug abuse, and 95% wanted drug use to remain illegal.

Criticizing governments that have relaxed their drug laws, Antonio Maria Costa, speaking in Washington before the launch of the World Drug Report in June 2006, said:

After so many years of drug control experience, we now know that a coherent, long-term strategy can reduce drug supply, demand and trafficking. If this does not happen, it will be because some nations fail to take the drug issue sufficiently seriously and pursue inadequate policies. Many countries have the drug problem they deserve.

=== Arguments that drug laws are ineffective ===
One of the prominent early critics of prohibition in the United States was August Vollmer, founder of the School of Criminology at University of California, Irvine and former president of the International Association of Chiefs of Police. In his 1936 book The Police and Modern Society, he stated his opinion that:

Stringent laws, spectacular police drives, vigorous prosecution, and imprisonment of addicts and peddlers have proved not only useless and enormously expensive as means of correcting this evil, but they are also unjustifiably and unbelievably cruel in their application to the unfortunate drug victims. Repression has driven this vice underground and produced the narcotic smugglers and supply agents, who have grown wealthy out of this evil practice and who, by devious methods, have stimulated traffic in drugs. Finally, and not the least of the evils associated with repression, the helpless addict has been forced to resort to crime in order to get money for the drug which is absolutely indispensable for his comfortable existence.

The first step in any plan to alleviate this dreadful affliction should be the establishment of Federal control and dispensation – at cost – of habit-forming drugs. With the profit motive gone, no effort would be made to encourage its use by private dispensers of narcotics, and the drug peddler would disappear. New addicts would be speedily discovered and through early treatment, some of these unfortunate victims might be saved from becoming hopelessly incurable.

Drug addiction, like prostitution, and like liquor, is not a police problem; it never has been, and never can be solved by policemen. It is first and last a medical problem, and if there is a solution it will be discovered not by policemen, but by scientific and competently trained medical experts whose sole objective will be the reduction and possible eradication of this devastating appetite. There should be intelligent treatment of the incurables in outpatient clinics, hospitalization of those not too far gone to respond to therapeutic measures, and application of the prophylactic principles which medicine applies to all scourges of mankind.

Stephen Rolles, writing in the British Medical Journal in 2010, argues:

Consensus is growing within the drugs field and beyond that the prohibition on production, supply, and use of certain drugs has not only failed to deliver its intended goals but has been counterproductive. Evidence is mounting that this policy has not only exacerbated many public health problems, such as adulterated drugs and the spread of HIV and hepatitis B and C infection among injecting drug users, but has created a much larger set of secondary harms associated with the criminal market. These now include vast networks of organised crime, endemic violence related to the drug market, corruption of law enforcement and governments.

These conclusions have been reached by a succession of committees and reports including, in the United Kingdom alone, the Police Foundation, the Home Affairs Select Committee, the Prime Minister's Strategy Unit, the Royal Society of Arts, and the UK Drug Policy Consortium. The United Nations Office of Drugs and Crime has also acknowledged the many "unintended negative consequences" of drug enforcement.

The editor of the British Medical Journal, Dr. Fiona Godlee, gave her personal support to Rolles' call for decriminalisation, and the arguments drew particular support from Sir Ian Gilmore, former president of the Royal College of Physicians, who said we should be treating drugs "as a health issue rather than criminalising people" and "this could drastically reduce crime and improve health".

Danny Kushlik, head of external affairs at Transform, said the intervention of senior medical professionals was significant. He said: "Sir Ian's statement is yet another nail in prohibition's coffin. The Hippocratic oath says: 'First, do no harm'. Physicians are duty bound to speak out if the outcomes show that prohibition causes more harm than it reduces."

Nicholas Green, chairman of the Bar Council, made comments in a report in the profession's magazine, in which he said that drug-related crime costs the UK economy about £13bn a year and that there was growing evidence that decriminalisation could free up police resources, reduce crime and recidivism and improve public health.

A 2006 report sponsored by the New York County Lawyers' Association, one of the largest local bar associations in the United States, argues on the subject of US drug policy:

Notwithstanding the vast public resources expended on the enforcement of penal statutes against users and distributors of controlled substances, contemporary drug policy appears to have failed, even on its own terms, in a number of notable respects. These include: minimal reduction in the consumption of controlled substances; failure to reduce violent crime; failure to markedly reduce drug importation, distribution and street-level drug sales; failure to reduce the widespread availability of drugs to potential users; failure to deter individuals from becoming involved in the drug trade; failure to impact upon the huge profits and financial opportunity available to individual "entrepreneurs" and organized underworld organizations through engaging in the illicit drug trade; the expenditure of great amounts of increasingly limited public resources in pursuit of a cost-intensive "penal" or "law-enforcement" based policy; failure to provide meaningful treatment and other assistance to people who use substances and their families; and failure to provide meaningful alternative economic opportunities to those attracted to the drug trade for lack of other available avenues for financial advancement.

Moreover, a growing body of evidence and opinion suggests that contemporary drug policy, as pursued in recent decades, may be counterproductive and even harmful to the society whose public safety it seeks to protect. This conclusion becomes more readily apparent when one distinguishes the harms suffered by society and its members directly attributable to the pharmacological effects of drug use upon human behavior, from those harms resulting from policies attempting to eradicate drug use.

With aid of these distinctions, we see that present drug policy appears to contribute to the increase of violence in our communities. It does so by permitting and indeed, causing the drug trade to remain a lucrative source of economic opportunity for street dealers, drug kingpins and all those willing to engage in the often violent, illicit, black market trade.

Meanwhile, the effect of present policy serves to stigmatize and marginalize drug users, thereby inhibiting and undermining the efforts of many such individuals to remain or become productive, gainfully employed members of society. Furthermore, current policy has not only failed to provide adequate access to treatment for substance use, it has, in many ways, rendered the obtaining of such treatment, and of other medical services, more difficult and even dangerous to pursue.

In response to claims that prohibition can work, as argued by Antonio Maria Costa, executive director of the United Nations Office on Drugs and Crime, who drew attention to the drug policy of Sweden, Henrik Tham has written in 1998 that sometimes it's domestically important to stress drug policy as successful; in the case of Sweden, where this notion is important, such claims serve "the function of strengthening a threatened national identity in a situation where the traditional 'Swedish model' has come under increasingly hard attack from both inside and outside the country." Tham questions the success of the Swedish model – "The shift in Swedish drug policy since around 1980" ...(more difficult to receive nolle prosequi for minor drug crimes) ..."towards a more strict model has according to the official point of view been successful by comparison with the earlier, more lenient drug policy. However, available systematic indicators show that the prevalence of drug use has increased since around 1980, that the decrease in drug incidence was particularly marked during the 1970s and that some indicators point towards an increase during the 1990s."

Leif Lenke and Börje Olsson from Stockholm University have conducted research that showed how drug use have followed the youth unemployment in close correlation. They noted that unlike most of Europe, Sweden did not have widespread and lingering youth unemployment until the early 1990s financial crisis, suggesting that unattractive future prospects may contribute to the increase in drug use among the young. CAN, the Swedish Council for Information on Alcohol and Other Drugs, 2009 report stated that the increase in drug use have continued since the 1990s with a slight dip in the mid-2000.

The professor emeritus in criminology at the University of Oslo, Nils Christie, pointed out Sweden as the hawk of international drug policy in a 2004 book. He said that Sweden is serving the role of being welfare alibi for, and lending legitimacy to, the US drug war. Adding that USA and Sweden have had an extraordinary influence on UNODC as the biggest donor countries. Sweden was the second biggest donor financing 8% of the UNODC budget behind the European Commission in 2006, followed by the US. In 2007 and 2008 Sweden was the fourth biggest donor, behind the European Commission, USA and Canada. In 2009 it was the third, as USA withdrew some of its funding.

A 2009 editorial in The Economist argued:

fear [of legalisation] is based in large part on the presumption that more people would take drugs under a legal regime. That presumption may be wrong. There is no correlation between the harshness of drug laws and the incidence of drug-taking: citizens living under tough regimes (notably America but also Britain) take more drugs, not fewer. Embarrassed drug warriors blame this on alleged cultural differences, but even in fairly similar countries tough rules make little difference to the number of addicts: harsh Sweden and more liberal Norway have precisely the same addiction rates.

Antonio Maria Costa's conviction that "countries have the drug problem they deserve" if they fail to follow the "Swedish Model" in drug control has also been criticised in Peter Cohen's work – Looking at the UN, smelling a rat.

In its 2011 report, the Global Commission on Drug Policy stated that "The global war on drugs has failed, with devastating consequences for individuals and societies around the world".

== Deterrence ==
=== Arguments that prohibition discourages drug use ===
A 2001 Australian study, of 18- to 29-year-olds by the NSW Bureau of Crime Statistics and Research suggests that prohibition deters illicit drug use. 29% of those who had never used cannabis cited the illegality of the substance as their reason for never using the drug, while 19% of those who had ceased use of cannabis cited its illegality as their reason.

Gil Kerlikowske, director of the US ONDCP argued,

Controls and prohibitions help to keep prices higher, and higher prices help keep use rates relatively low, since drug use, especially among young people, is known to be sensitive to price. The relationship between pricing and rates of youth substance use is well-established with respect to alcohol and cigarette taxes. There is literature showing that increases in the price of cigarettes triggers declines in use."

The DEA argues "Legalization has been tried before—and failed miserably. Alaska's experiment with legalization in the 1970s led to the state's teens using marijuana at more than twice the rate of other youths nationally. This led Alaska's residents to vote to re-criminalize marijuana in 1990."

Drug Free Australia has cited the Netherlands as an example of drug policy failure because it is soft in approach. They argue that the Dutch idea of going soft on cannabis dealers, thereby creating a "separation of markets" from hard drug dealers has failed to stem the initiation to drugs such as heroin, cocaine, and amphetamines, saying that, in 1998, the Netherlands had the third highest cannabis and cocaine use in Europe. According to Barry McCaffrey of the US Office of National Drug Control Policy, Dutch tolerance has allowed the Netherlands to become a criminal epicentre for illicit synthetic drug manufacture, particularly ecstasy, as well as the home for production and worldwide export of strains of cannabis with THC reportedly 10 times higher than normal. Gil Kerlikowske has attested that, where there were once thousands of cannabis cafés there are now only several hundred. Levels of cannabis use, in 2005 only marginally higher than in 1998, while other European countries have accelerated past them, are more likely, Drug Free Australia argues, the result of a growing intolerance of cannabis in the Netherlands rather than a growing tolerance. Drug Free Australia has also argued that British reductions in cannabis use after softer legislation may be more so the result of heavy UK media exposure of the stronger evidence of links between cannabis and psychosis.

=== Arguments that prohibition does not discourage drug use ===
It has been suggested that drug law reform could reduce the use of hard drugs as it has in countries such as the Netherlands. According to a 2009 annual report by the European Monitoring Centre for Drugs and Drug Addiction, the Dutch are among the lowest users of marijuana or cannabis in Europe, despite the Netherlands' policy on soft drugs being one of the most liberal in Europe, allowing for the sale of marijuana at "coffee shops", which the Dutch have allowed to operate for decades, and possession of less than 5 grams (0.18 ounces).

British Crime Survey statistics indicated that the proportion of 16- to 24-year-olds using cannabis decreased from 28% a decade ago to 21%, with its declining popularity accelerating after the decision to downgrade the drug to class C was announced in January 2004. The BCS figures, published in October 2007, showed that the proportion of frequent users in the 16–24 age group (i.e. who were using cannabis more than once a month), fell from 12% to 8% in the past four years.

American teenagers are drinking and smoking less and doing fewer drugs than their predecessors in more than 40 years of tracking. Use of marijuana is down among 8th- and 10th-graders, though it is flat among high school seniors, according to the annual Monitoring the Future survey of American teens.

A 2008 scholarly study found that intensified enforcement of marijuana laws does not achieve the stated goals of marijuana prohibition and that "decriminalizing marijuana possession or deprioritizing marijuana law enforcement does not appear to increase marijuana use".

== Gateway drug theory ==
=== Arguments that cannabis is a gateway drug ===
The US Drug Enforcement Agency's "2008 Marijuana Sourcebook" argues that recent research supports the gateway hypothesis that certain drugs (such as cannabis) act as gateways to use of 'harder' drugs such as heroin, either because of social contact or because of an increasing search for a better high. Proponents cite studies such as that of 311 same sex twins, where only one twin smoked cannabis before age 17, and where such early cannabis smokers were five times more likely than their twin to move on to harder drugs.

=== Arguments that cannabis is not a gateway drug ===
In the American Journal of Public Health, Andrew Golub and Bruce Johnson of the National Development and Research Institute in New York wrote that young people who smoked marijuana in the generations before and after the baby boomers did not appear to be likely to move on to harder drugs.

Researchers from the independent Rand Drug Policy Research Center in Santa Monica, California, looking at data from the National Household Survey on Drug Abuse between 1982 and 1994, concluded that teenagers who took hard drugs did so whether they had first tried cannabis or not.

A twin study (of 510 same sex twin pairs) which adjusted for additional confounders such as peer drug use, found that cannabis use and associations with later hard drug use existed only for non-identical twins. The study suggested that a causal role of cannabis use in later hard drug usage is minimal, if it exists at all, and that cannabis use and hard drug use share the same influencing factors such as genetics and environment.

== Health ==
=== Health arguments for drug laws ===
Advocates of prohibition argue that particular drugs should be illegal because they are harmful. Drug Free Australia for example argues "That illicit drugs are inherently harmful substances is attested by the very nomenclature of the 'harm reduction' movement." The U.S. government has argued that illegal drugs are "far more deadly than alcohol" saying "although alcohol is used by seven times as many people as drugs, the number of deaths induced by those substances is not far apart. According to the Centers for Disease Control and Prevention (CDC), during 2000, there were 15,852 drug-induced deaths; only slightly less than the 18,539 alcohol-induced deaths." Ratios of the harms of illicit opiates to licit alcohol and tobacco in Australia are similar, with 2 deaths per hundred opiate users per annum versus 0.22 deaths per hundred for alcohol (9 times less) per year and 0.3 for tobacco (7 times less).

The DEA has said:

Marijuana is far more powerful than it used to be. In 2000, there were six times as many emergency room mentions of marijuana use as there were in 1990, despite the fact that the number of people using marijuana is roughly the same. In 1999, a record 225,000 Americans entered substance abuse treatment primarily for marijuana dependence, second only to heroin—and not by much. ... According to the National Institute on Drug Abuse, "Studies show that someone who smokes five joints per week may be taking in as many cancer-causing chemicals as someone who smokes a full pack of cigarettes every day." Marijuana contains more than 400 chemicals, including the most harmful substances found in tobacco smoke. For example, smoking one marijuana cigarette deposits about four times more tar into the lungs than a filtered tobacco cigarette. ... The short-term effects are also harmful. They include: memory loss, distorted perception, trouble with thinking and problem solving, loss of motor skills, decrease in muscle strength, increased heart rate, and anxiety. Marijuana impacts young people's mental development, their ability to concentrate in school, and their motivation and initiative to reach goals. And marijuana affects people of all ages: Harvard University researchers report that the risk of a heart attack is five times higher than usual in the hour after smoking marijuana.

— US Drug Enforcement Administration (2003). "Speaking Out Against Drug Legalization"

Many of the deaths from using cannabis, other than from car accidents while intoxicated or violence and aggression, are more likely to figure in the longer term, just as with tobacco, where both nicotine overdose and cannabis overdose are extremely rare or nonexistent. While ecstasy may have lower rates of immediate mortality than some other illicits, there is a growing science on the already recognized considerable health harms of ecstasy. Drug Free Australia argues that distinctions between "soft" and "hard" drugs are entirely artificial, and titling cannabis "soft" or ecstasy "recreational" does not lessen the extensive harms of these substances.

Gil Kerlikowske, former director of the US Office of National Drug Control Policy (ONDCP) argues that in the United States, illegal drugs already cost $180 billion a year in health care, lost productivity, crime, and other expenditures, and that number would only increase under legalization because of increased use.

Drug Free Australia claims arguments that increased health harms of illicit drugs are the result of lack of government regulation of their purity and strength are not well supported by evidence. In Australia, which has had the highest opioid mortality per capita in the OECD, studies found that "overdose fatality is not a simple function of heroin dose or purity. There is no evidence of toxicity from contaminants of street heroin in Australia." Drug Free Australia claims that other causes of death such as suicide, murder and accidents are an effect of the drug themselves, not of their purity or otherwise.

==== Addiction ====
Drug Free Australia argues "Regarding the freedom of choice of those addicted to a drug, it is important to recognize that addiction is defined as compulsive by its very nature and that addictions curb individual freedom." ... "As is the case with alcohol addiction, illicit drug addictions likewise serve to keep many such users functionally in poverty and often as a continued burden on friends, family and society. Where it is argued that all disabilities are a burden on society it must be recognized that most disabilities are not the result of a choice, whereas the decision to recreationally use illicit drugs is most commonly free, and with the knowledge that they may lead to an abundance of addictions."

=== Health arguments for drug law reform ===
Drug harms vary between drugs according to a ISCD study.

There is evidence that some illicit drugs pose comparatively fewer health dangers than certain legal drugs. The health risks of MDMA (Ecstasy) have been exaggerated for instance, the risks from cannabis use also overstated, and health problems from the use of legal substances, particularly alcohol and tobacco, are greater, even than from cocaine use for example (occasional cocaine use does not typically lead to severe or even minor physical or social problems).

==== Health benefits ====
A 2015 study of 135,095 U.S. adults found no significant link between lifetime psychedelic use and increased mental health problems or suicidal behavior. The researchers concluded that the prohibition of psychedelics is challenging to justify on public health grounds, given these findings.

Many trials have shown beneficial effects associated with psychoactive drug use:

- There is evidence that MDMA (ecstasy) can treat or cure post-traumatic stress disorder and anxiety in cases of terminal illness.
- LSD has been widely researched as a therapeutic agent, and has shown effectiveness against alcoholism, frigidity and various other disorders. See Psychedelic therapy.
- Researchers at Harvard-affiliated McLean Hospital found members of a religious group regularly using peyote scored significantly better on several measures of overall mental health than did subjects who did not use the hallucinogen.
- A 2007 study, by Santos et al. found that users of ayahuasca scored better on tests measuring anxiety and hopelessness than people who did not use the drug.

==== Quality control ====
According to a World Health Organization report: "As cannabis is an illegal drug its cultivation, harvesting and distribution are not subject to quality control mechanisms to ensure the reliability and safety of the product used by consumers. It is well recognised in developing countries, such as Kenya, that illicit alcohol production can result in the contamination with toxic by-products or adulterants that can kill or seriously affect the health of users. The same may be true of illicit drugs such as opiates, cocaine and amphetamine in developed societies."

The government cannot enforce quality control on products sold and manufactured illegally. Examples include: the easier to make derivative MDA being sold as MDMA, heroin users unintentionally injecting brick dust, quinine, or fentanyl with which their heroin had been cut; and heroin/cocaine overdoses occurring as a result of users not knowing exactly how much they are taking. If the supply of drugs such as ecstasy came from legitimate pharmaceutical companies, their product would be far less likely to contain toxic additives or varying dosages. This is a view supported by a number of parents whose children have died of overdoses.

The illegality of injectable drugs leads to a scarcity of needles which causes an increase in HIV infections. An easy cure to this problem, while upholding the illegality of drugs, is the Dutch policy of distributing free needles. The money spent on both increased health costs due to HIV infections and drug prohibition itself causes a drain upon society.

Studies on the effects of prescribing heroin to addicts as practiced in many European countries have shown better rates of success than any other available treatment in terms of assisting long-term users establish stable, crime-free lives. Many patients were able to find employment, some even started a family after years of homelessness and delinquency.

==== Block to research ====
The illegality of many recreational drugs may be dissuading research into new, more effective and perhaps safer recreational drugs, despite evidence that their use may be beneficial in certain contexts. Research on Schedule I drugs in many countries, including the United States and United Kingdom, and under international law, is tightly regulated and requires expensive and hard-to-obtain permits. Such restrictions have largely prevented investigation of their properties and therapeutic uses, and most research since the passage of the drug laws focuses on negative impacts of these drugs. For example, all known agonists of the 5HT_{2A} receptor are psychedelics, which prevents research into this receptor.

In particular, research suggests that recreational drugs may have psychiatric applications, which many demonstrating potential for treatment-resistant mental health conditions, such as depression and anxiety. Those who support the legalisation of recreational drugs for research purposes highlight that it is unethical not to conduct research into therapeutic interventions that may have the potential to treat these conditions.

==== Misleading health statistics ====
The United States Drug Enforcement Administration (DEA) has suggested that illegal drugs are "far more deadly than alcohol", arguing that "although alcohol is used by seven times as many people as drugs, the number of deaths induced by those substances is not far apart", quoting figures from the Centers for Disease Control and Prevention (CDC), claiming "during 2000, there were 15,852 drug-induced deaths; only slightly less than the 18,539 alcohol-induced deaths."

The DEA's use of such figures is questionable however. An article in the Journal of the American Medical Association gave the number deaths caused by alcohol in year 2000 as 85,000 – over four and a half times greater than the DEA's preferred figure. (Note: According to the National Institute on Alcohol Abuse and Alcoholism the number of alcohol-related deaths in 1996 was 110,640.) The DEA's argument also overlooks tobacco, causing 435,000 US deaths in year 2000. And, the CDC definition of "drug-induced death" includes suicides using drugs, accidental overdose, (Note: It is argued that the number deaths attributable to overdose could be reduced if drug users had access to legal products of known quality and dosage) and deaths from medically prescribed (not illegal) drugs. An analysis of drug-induced deaths for the 20-year period 1979–1998 found the vast majority attributable to accidental overdose, and suicide by drug taking, which together account for about 76 percent of all such deaths. Taking into account deaths from non-illegal drugs leaves only 21 percent of CDC "drug-induced death" figures actually due to the use of "illegal" drugs.

Claims that cannabis is far more powerful than it used to be are also dubious, with "scare figures" skewed by comparing the weakest cannabis from the past with the strongest of today. Figures regarding emergency room mentions of marijuana use can be misleading too, as "mention" of a drug in an emergency department visit does not mean that the drug was the cause of the visit.

=== Medical uses ===
A document published for the non-profit advocacy organization Europe Against Drugs (EURAD) argues that "one cannot vote for a medicine" and that a scientific approval basis is essential. It says that EU rules set out strict criteria for the acceptance of a drug for medical use:

All active ingredients have to be identified and their chemistry determined. They have to be tested for purity with limits set for all impurities including pesticides, microbe & fungi and their products. These tests have to be validated and reproduced if necessary in an official laboratory. Animal testing will include information on fertility, embryo toxicity, immuno-toxicity, mutagenic and carcinogenic potential. Risks to humans, especially pregnant women and lactating mothers, will be evaluated. Adequate safety and efficacy trials must be carried out. They must state the method of administration and report on the results from different groups, i.e. healthy volunteers, patients, special groups of the elderly, people with liver and kidney problems and pregnant women. Adverse drug reactions (ADR) have to be stated and include any effects on driving or operating machinery.

— EURAD

==== Arguments against medical uses of prohibited drugs ====
According to Janet D. Lapey, M.D., of Concerned Citizens For Drug Prevention, " Due to a placebo effect, a patient may erroneously believe a drug is helpful when it is not. This is especially true of addictive, mind-altering drugs like marijuana. A marijuana withdrawal syndrome occurs, consisting of anxiety, depression, sleep and appetite disturbances, irritability, tremors, diaphoresis, nausea, muscle convulsions, and restlessness. Often, persons using marijuana erroneously believe that the drug is helping them combat these symptoms without realizing that actually marijuana is the cause of these effects. Therefore, when a patient anecdotally reports a drug to have medicinal value, this must be followed by objective scientific studies."

The US Drug Enforcement Administration also says:

There is a growing misconception that some illegal drugs can be taken safely. For example, savvy drug dealers have learned how to market drugs like Ecstasy to youth. Some in the Legalization Lobby even claim such drugs have medical value, despite the lack of conclusive scientific evidence.

— US Drug Enforcement Administration (2003). "Speaking Out Against Drug Legalization"

==== Arguments for medical uses of prohibited drugs ====
Most of the psychoactive drugs now prohibited in modern societies have had medical uses in history. In natural plant drugs like opium, coca, cannabis, mescaline, and psilocybin, the medical history usually dates back thousands of years and through a variety of cultures.

Psychedelics such as LSD and psilocybin (the main ingredient in most hallucinogenic mushrooms) are the subject of renewed research interest because of their therapeutic potential. They could ease a variety of difficult-to-treat mental illnesses, such as chronic depression, post-traumatic stress disorder, and alcohol dependency. In 2018, the United States Food and Drug Administration (FDA) granted breakthrough therapy designation for psilocybin-assisted therapy for treatment-resistant major depressive disorder. In 2019, the FDA also granted breakthrough therapy designation for psilocybin therapy treating major depressive disorder more generally. MDMA (Ecstasy) has been used for cognitive enhancement in people with Parkinson's disease, and has shown potential in treating posttraumatic stress disorder, social anxiety, and alcohol addiction.

==== Lack of access to controlled medications ====
Under prohibition, millions of people find it very difficult to obtain controlled medications, particularly opiate pain-relievers. The United Nations 1961 Single Convention on Narcotic Drugs requires that opiates be distributed only by medical prescription, but this is impractical in many areas.

According to the Transnational Institute, June 2008:

According to the International Narcotics Control Board (INCB) and the World Health Organisation (WHO) there is now an unmet demand in opiates. Ironically, the current drug control regulations hamper access to controlled opiate medications for therapeutic use. Many patients are unable to access morphine, methadone or an equivalent opioid. Global medical morphine consumption would rise five times if countries would make morphine available at the level of the calculated need, according to a recent WHO estimate.

According to the New York Times, September 2007:

Under Sierra Leone law, morphine may be handled only by a pharmacist or doctor, explained Gabriel Madiye, the hospice's founder. But in all Sierra Leone there are only about 100 doctors — one for every 54,000 people, compared with one for every 350 in the United States.... "How can they say there is no demand when they don't allow it?" he [Madiye] asked. "How can they be so sure that it will get out of control when they haven't even tried it?"

== Economic ==
=== Economic arguments for prohibitive drug laws ===
The DEA argues that "compared to the social costs of drug abuse and addiction—whether in taxpayer dollars or in pain and suffering—government spending on drug control is minimal."

Antonio Maria Costa, executive director of the United Nations Office on Drugs and Crime, has said:

The economic argument for drug legalization says: legalize drugs, and generate tax income. This argument is gaining favour, as national administrations seek new sources of revenue during the current economic crisis. This legalize and tax argument is un-ethical and uneconomical. It proposes a perverse tax, generation upon generation, on marginalized cohorts (lost to addiction) to stimulate economic recovery. Are the partisans of this cause also in favour of legalizing and taxing other seemingly intractable crimes like human trafficking? Modern-day slaves (and there are millions of them) would surely generate good tax revenue to rescue failed banks. The economic argument is also based on poor fiscal logic: any reduction in the cost of drug control (due to lower law enforcement expenditure) will be offset by much higher expenditure on public health (due to the surge of drug consumption). The moral of the story: don't make wicked transactions.

— Antonio Maria Costa, executive director of UNODC (June 2009). Preface to World Drug Report 2009.

Gil Kerlikowske, former director of the US ONDCP, argues that legalizing drugs, then regulating and taxing their sale, would not be effective fiscally.

The tax revenue collected from alcohol pales in comparison to the costs associated with it. Federal excise taxes collected on alcohol in 2007, totaled around $9 billion; states collected around $5.5 billion. Taken together, this is less than 10 percent of the over $185 billion in alcohol-related costs from health care, lost productivity, and criminal justice. Tobacco also does not carry its economic weight when we tax it; each year we spend more than $200 billion on its social costs and collect only about $25 billion in taxes.

— Gil Kerlikowske, current director of the ONDCP (April 2010). Why Marijuana Legalization Would Compromise Public Health and Public Safety.

Former directors of the ONDCP, John P. Walters and Barry McCaffrey have accused billionaires George Soros, Peter Lewis and John Sperling of bankrolling the pro-pot or drug legalisation movement. "These people use ignorance and their overwhelming amount of money to influence the electorate", Walters said. Billionaire US financier, George Soros said in his autobiography, "I would establish a strictly controlled distribution network through which I would make most drugs, excluding the most dangerous ones like crack, legally available." The drug legalization lobby's vigorous and well funded promotion in media and schools of a "safe use of illegal drugs" message indicates that drug prohibition is in the midst of a pitched battle waged by those who are accepting not only of the drug user but who also strongly promote an acceptance of drug use itself.

==== Prohibition of hemp industry ====
Opposition to the legalization of hemp, which uses plants of the cannabis genus for commercial purposes, centres on the fact that those wanting to legalize the use of cannabis for recreational and medical purposes themselves present it as their Trojan horse for that very purpose:

Alex Shum, importers of hemp fabric, "feel that the way to legalize marijuana is to sell marijuana legally. When you can buy marijuana in your neighbourhood shopping mall, IT'S LEGAL! So, they are going to produce every conceivable thing out of hemp.

— High Times, "Hemp Clothing is Here!", March 1990

In a Huffington Post interview, Mark Kleiman, the "Pot Czar" of Washington state, said he was concerned that the National Cannabis Industry Association would favor profits over public health. He also said that it could become a predatory body like the lobbying arms of the tobacco and alcohol industries. Kleiman said: "The fact that the National Cannabis Industry Association has hired itself a K Street suit [lobbyist] is not a good sign."

=== Economic arguments for drug law reform ===
The United States efforts at drug prohibition started out with a $350 million budget in 1971, and was in 2006 a $30 billion campaign. These numbers only include direct prohibition enforcement expenditures, and as such only represent part of the total cost of prohibition. This $30 billion figure rises dramatically once other issues, such as the economic impact of holding 400,000 prisoners on prohibition violations, are factored in.

The war on drugs is extremely costly to such societies that outlaw drugs in terms of taxpayer money, lives, productivity, the inability of law enforcement to pursue mala in se crimes, and social inequality. Some proponents of decriminalization say that the financial and social costs of drug law enforcement far exceed the damages that the drugs themselves cause. For instance, in 1999, close to 60,000 prisoners (3.3% of the total incarcerated population) convicted of violating marijuana laws were behind bars at a cost to taxpayers of some $1.2 billion per year. In 1980, the total jail and prison population was 540,000, about one-quarter the size it is today. Drug offenders accounted for 6% of all prisoners. According to the Federal Bureau of Prisons, drug offenders now account for nearly 51%.

It has been argued that if the US government legalised marijuana it would save $7.7 billion per year in expenditure on enforcement of prohibition. Also, that marijuana legalization would yield tax revenue of $2.4 billion annually if it were taxed like all other goods and $6.2 billion annually if it were taxed at rates comparable to those on alcohol and tobacco.

According to a 2018 report, legalising cannabis in the United Kingdom could raise between 1 and 3.5 billion pounds in tax and lead to savings for the police and the criminal justice system. It has been argued that the raised tax revenue could then be invested in public services, such as the budget of the National Health Service (NHS).

As of 2023, the legalisation of cannabis has helped to create 151,000 jobs in Canada since its legalisation in October 2018.

As of August 2025, Canada had collected over $5.4 billion in cannabis tax revenue since the legalisation of cannabis in the country. This tax revenue does not include the province of Manitoba, due to the province not taking part in the federally managed cannabis taxation framework.

==== The creation of drug cartels ====
Mass arrests of local growers of marijuana, for example, not only increase the price of local drugs, but lessens competition. Only major retailers that can handle massive shipments, have their own small fleet of aircraft, troops to defend the caravans and other sophisticated methods of eluding the police (such as lawyers), can survive by this regulation of the free market by the government

... it is because it's prohibited. See, if you look at the drug war from a purely economic point of view, the role of the government is to protect the drug cartel. That's literally true.

— Milton Friedman

==== Effect on producer countries ====
The United States' "war on drugs" has added considerably to the political instability in South America. The huge profits to be made from cocaine and other South American-grown drugs are largely because they are illegal in the wealthy neighbouring nation. This drives people in the relatively poor countries of Colombia, Peru, Bolivia and Brazil to break their own laws in organising the cultivation, preparation and trafficking of cocaine to the States. This has allowed criminal, paramilitary and guerrilla groups to reap huge profits, exacerbating already serious law-and-order and political problems. Within Bolivia, the political rise of former president Evo Morales was directly related to his grassroots movement against US-sponsored coca-eradication and criminalization policies. However, coca has been cultivated for centuries in the Andes. Among their various legitimate uses, coca leaves are chewed for their mild stimulant & appetite suppression effects, and steeped as a tea which is known to reduce the effects of human altitude sickness. Rural farmers in the poor regions in which coca has historically been cultivated often find themselves at the difficult and potentially violent intersection of government-sponsored eradication efforts, illegal cocaine producers & traffickers seeking coca supplies, anti-government paramilitary forces trafficking in cocaine as a source of revolutionary funding, and the historical hardships of rural subsistence farming (or its typical alternative – abandoning their land and fleeing to an urban slum). In some regions, farmers' coca and other crops are frequently destroyed by U.S.-sponsored eradication treatments (usually sprayed from the air with varying degrees of discrimination), whether or not the farmers directly supply the cocaine trade, thereby destroying their livelihoods. Agricultural producers in these countries are pushed further to grow coca for the cocaine trade by the dumping of subsidised farming products (fruit, vegetables, grain etc.) produced by Western countries (predominantly US and EU agricultural surpluses) (see BBC reference, below), which reduces the prices they could otherwise receive for alternate crops such as maize. The net effect can be a depression of prices for all crops, which can both make the farmer's livelihood more precarious, and make the cocaine producers' coca supplies cheaper.

After providing a significant portion of the world's poppy for use in heroin production, Afghanistan went from producing practically no illegal drugs in 2000 (following banning by the Taliban), to cultivating what is now as much as 90% of the world's opium. The Taliban is currently believed to be heavily supported by the opium trade there.

Furthermore, the sale of the illegal drugs produces an influx of dollars that is outside the formal economy, and puts pressure on the currency exchange keeping the dollar low and making the export of legal products more difficult.

==== Prohibition of hemp industry ====
The war on drugs has resulted in the outlawing of the entire hemp industry in the United States. Hemp, which is a special cultivar of Cannabis sativa, does not have significant amounts of psychoactive (THC) substances in it, less than 1%. Without even realizing the plant had been outlawed several months prior, Popular Mechanics magazine published an article in 1938 entitled "The New Billion-Dollar Crop" anticipating the explosion of the hemp industry with the invention of machines to help process it. Recently, governmental refusal to take advantage of taxing hemp has been a point of criticism. Hemp has a large list of potential industrial uses including textiles, paper, rope, fuel, construction materials, and biocomposites (for use in cars for example). Hemp has some drawbacks, however, one being that the long fibers in hemp are only a part of the outer bast, and this has contributed to hemp having only modest commercial success in countries (for example in Canada) where it is legal to harvest hemp.

The seed of the hemp plant is highly nutritious. Rare for a plant, it contains all essential amino acids. Rare for any food, it is a good source of alpha-linolenic acid, an omega 3 fatty acid which is deficient in most diets.

==== Legalization as a job creator ====
Drug legalization has the potential to create a vast array of jobs, in sectors such as: sales, distribution, transportation, growing, cultivation, production, quality assurance, regulatory bodies, advertising, scientific research and lab analysis. If certain drugs were to be sold solely at single-purpose licensed premises then construction of these stores would also help the construction industry.

A 2019 jobs count found that legalized cannabis had directly created 211,000 full-time workers in the U.S., part of a total of 296,000 in all related areas combined (as a total of states where cannabis is legal). Nick Colas at DataTrek Research said in 2019 that cannabis is the "fastest-growing labor market in the U.S." If cannabis were to be legalized nationally across the U.S., it is estimated that it would create over one million jobs.

Before the legalization of cannabis in Canada, it was estimated that the legalization of cannabis in the country would create thousands of new jobs. However, comprehensive statistics regarding the total amount jobs created by legalized cannabis in Canada have yet to be published post legalization. Cannabis was legalized in Canada on 17 October 2018.

== Crime, terrorism and social order ==
=== Arguments for prohibitive drug laws ===
While concerns are sometimes expressed that the "war on drugs" can never be won, there is a failure to recognize that other justifiably costly policing wars such as "blitzes" on speeding can likewise never be won. Such blitzes reduce and contain speeding, as with policing of illicit drug use. Failure to police speeding drivers simply allows inordinate harm to be inflicted on other individuals. Speeding is not legalized simply because it can never be eradicated.

There is an argument that much crime and terrorism is drug related or drug funded and that prohibition should reduce this.

Former US president George W. Bush, in signing the Drug-Free Communities Act Reauthorization Bill in December 2001, said, "If you quit drugs, you join the fight against terror in America."

The US Office of National Drug Control Policy (ONDCP) says that drug-related offences may include violent behavior resulting from drug effects.

The US Drug Enforcement Administration claims:

Crime, violence and drug use go hand in hand. Six times as many homicides are committed by people under the influence of drugs, as by those who are looking for money to buy drugs. Most drug crimes aren't committed by people trying to pay for drugs; they're committed by people on drugs.

— US Drug Enforcement Administration (2003). "Speaking Out Against Drug Legalization"

The U.S. government began the Drug Use Forecasting (DUF) program in 1987 to collect information on drug use among urban arrestees. In 1997, the National Institute of Justice expanded and reengineered the DUF study and renamed it the Arrestee Drug Abuse Monitoring (ADAM) program. ADAM is a network of 34 research sites in select U.S. cities.

DUF research indicates that:

- Frequent use of hard drugs is one of the strongest indicators of a criminal career.
- Offenders who use drugs are among the most serious and active criminals, engaging in both property and violent crime.
- Early and persistent use of cocaine or heroin in the juvenile years is an indicator of serious, persistent criminal behavior in adulthood.
- Those arrested who are drug users are more likely than those not using drugs to be rearrested on pretrial release or fail to appear at trial.

Criminal behavior can importantly be the direct result of drug use which can cause emotional/brain damage, mental illness and anti-social behavior. Psychoactive drugs can have a powerful impact on behavior which may influence some people to commit crimes that have nothing to do with supporting the cost of their drug use. The use of drugs changes behavior and causes criminal activity because people will do things they wouldn't do if they were rational and free of the drug's influence. Cocaine-related paranoia is an example. If drug use increases with legalization, so will such forms of related violent crime as assaults, drugged driving, child abuse, and domestic violence.

That higher prices make the trade lucrative for criminals is recognized but countered by the argument that capitulating to illicit drug use on these grounds makes no more sense than capitulating to those who continue to traffic in human lives, a more expensive business because of its illegality and therefore more lucrative for the criminal, but necessary for the rights of vulnerable citizens.

The Office of National Drug Control Policy says that the idea that our nation's prisons are overflowing with otherwise law-abiding people convicted for nothing more than simple possession of marijuana is a myth, "an illusion conjured and aggressively perpetuated by drug advocacy groups seeking to relax or abolish America's marijuana laws." ONDCP state that the vast majority of inmates in state and federal prison for marijuana have been found guilty of much more than simple possession. Some were convicted for drug trafficking, some for marijuana possession along with one or more other offenses. And many of those serving time for marijuana pleaded down to possession in order to avoid prosecution on much more serious charges. In the US, just 1.6 percent of the state inmate population were held for offences involving only marijuana, and less than one percent of all state prisoners (0.7 percent) were incarcerated with marijuana possession as the only charge. An even smaller fraction of state prisoners were first time offenders (0.3 percent). The numbers on the US federal prisons are similar. In 2001, the overwhelming majority of offenders sentenced for marijuana crimes were convicted for trafficking and only 63 served time for simple possession.

Detective superintendent Eva Brännmark from the Swedish National Police Board, in a speech given to Drug Free Australia's first international conference on illicit drug use, said:

The police have been able to solve other crimes, e.g. burglaries, thefts and robberies, by questioning people arrested for using drugs. Some even provide information about people who are selling drugs, and the police have seized large amounts of drugs as a result of information from people brought in for a urine test. Many interrogations of drug abusers have also resulted in search warrants and the recovery of stolen property.

— Brännmark, Eva (2007). "Law Enforcement – the Swedish Model" in Drug Free Australia's First International Conference on Illicit Drug Use.

The argument that drug addicts of certain drugs are forced into crime by prohibition should first and foremost highlight the fact that this argument presupposes and underlines the addictive nature of some illicit drugs (which legalization proponents often downplay), addictive enough to create a viable criminal supply industry. Secondly, the harms of increased addictive drug use, which as previously outlined would be a consequence of legalization and its cheaper prices, far outweigh the current crime harms of prohibition. It is worth pointing out, this argument is not useful for substances such as LSD and mescaline, with no addictive properties.

Although criminal punishments vary with rooting out drug usage, it is not the foremost eradication technique to resolve substance use disorder issues. In order to combat these issues, the application of treatment and support group resources coupled with community support and understanding, has far higher long-term potential to cure the ever-growing epidemic plaguing the nation, especially in rural areas.

=== Arguments for drug law reform ===
In 2021, Professor Peter Singer described the war on drugs as an expensive, ineffective and extremely harmful policy.

In October 2023, legal market capture of cannabis in Canada after 5 years of legalisation was approximately 78%.

==== Violence and profits of drugs traffickers ====
Prohibition protects the drug cartel insofar as it keeps the distribution in the black market and creates the risk that makes smuggling profitable. As former federal narcotics officer Michael Levine states in relation to his undercover work with Colombian cocaine cartels, from Lamar

"I learned that not only did they not fear our war on drugs, they counted on it to increase the market price and to weed out the smaller, inefficient drug dealers. They found U.S. interdiction efforts laughable. The only U.S. action they feared was an effective demand reduction program. On one undercover tape-recorded conversation, a top cartel chief, Jorge Roman, expressed his gratitude for the drug war, calling it "a sham put on for the American taxpayer" that was actually "good for business".

Critics of drug prohibition often cite the fact that the end of alcohol prohibition in 1933 led to immediate decreases in murders and robberies to support the argument that legalization of drugs could have similar effects. Once those involved in the narcotics trade have a legal method of settling business disputes, the number of murders and violent crime could drop. Robert W. Sweet, a federal judge, strongly agrees: "The present policy of trying to prohibit the use of drugs through the use of criminal law is a mistake". When alcohol use was outlawed during prohibition, it gave rise to gang warfare and spurred the formation of some of the most well known criminals of the era, among them the infamous Al Capone. Similarly, drug dealers today resolve their disputes through violence and intimidation, something which legal drug vendors do not do. Prohibition critics also point to the fact that police are more likely to be corrupted in a system where bribe money is so available. Police corruption due to drugs is widespread enough that one pro-legalization newsletter has made it a weekly feature.

Drug money has been called a major source of income for terrorist organizations. Critics assert that legalization would remove this central source of support for terrorism. While politicians blame drug users for being a major source of financing terrorists, no clear evidence of this link has been provided. US government agencies and government officials have been caught trafficking drugs to finance US-supported terrorist actions in events such as the Iran-Contra Affair, and Manuel Noriega but the isolated nature of these events precludes them from being major sources of financing.

==== Corruption ====
Human rights organizations and legal scholars have claimed that drug prohibition inevitably leads to police corruption.

On 2 July 2010, former Interpol President Jackie Selebi was found guilty of corruption by the South African High Court in Johannesburg for accepting bribes worth US$156,000 from a drug trafficker. After being charged in January 2008, Selebi resigned as president of Interpol and was put on extended leave as National Police Commissioner of South Africa.

==== Stigma of conviction ====
Despite the fact that most drug offenders are non-violent, the stigma attached to a conviction can prevent employment and education.

Since the human brain continues to mature past age eighteen and into a person's early twenties, it has been argued that many adult drug users will have made decisions to take drugs when their brains were not fully developed and thus they may not have adequately appreciated the risks (as many drug users are under the age of thirty). Since having a drug conviction will create societal disadvantages for the rest of a person's life, it has been argued that drug laws do not adequately take into account the full extent of human maturity when punishing people for taking drugs.

==== Children being lured into the illegal drug trade ====
Janet Crist of the White House Office of National Drug Control Policy mentioned that the anti-drug efforts have had "no direct effect on either the price or the availability of cocaine on our streets". Additionally, drug dealers show off expensive jewellery and clothing to young children. Some of these children are interested in making fast money instead of working legitimate jobs. Drug decriminalization would remove the "glamorous Al Capone-type traffickers who are role-models for the young".

The lack of government regulation and control over the lucrative illegal drug market has created a large population of unregulated drug dealers who lure many children into the illegal drug trade. The U.S. government's most recent 2009 National Survey on Drug Use and Health (NSDUH) reported that nationwide over 800,000 adolescents ages 12–17 sold illegal drugs during the previous 12 months preceding the survey. The 2005 Youth Risk Behavior Survey by the U.S. Centers for Disease Control and Prevention (CDC) reported that nationwide 25.4% of students had been offered, sold, or given an illegal drug by someone on school property. The prevalence of having been offered, sold, or given an illegal drug on school property ranged from 15.5% to 38.7% across state CDC surveys (median: 26.1%) and from 20.3% to 40.0% across local surveys (median: 29.4%).

Despite more than $7 billion spent annually towards arresting and prosecuting nearly 800,000 people across the country for marijuana offenses in 2005, the federally funded Monitoring the Future Survey reports about 85% of high school seniors find marijuana "easy to obtain." That figure has remained virtually unchanged since 1975, never dropping below 82.7% in three decades of national surveys.

==== Environmental ====
With respect to drug crop cultivation, eradication efforts in line with prohibitionist drug policies ultimately force coca, poppy, and marijuana growers into more remote, ecologically sensitive areas. These crops, which are generally grown away from urban centers and state presence, tend to deplete forestland and expand the agricultural frontier. Out of fear of eradication, cultivators are incentivized to accelerate production cycles in order to obtain the highest yield in the shortest period of time; the pace and methods used by growers neglect measures to promote sustainability, exacerbating the environmental impact. Drug cultivators typically opt to produce in areas with ecosystems with abundant plant biomass to better conceal their operations. Ultimately, this practice leads to increased deforestation which contributes to a greater influx of greenhouse gases into the atmosphere. Moreover, the aerial spraying of herbicides such as glyphosate used in eradication and control efforts have been shown to have negative effects on environmental and human health.

The "balloon effect" also operates further up the drug commodity chain in countries where drugs are trafficked rather than cultivated. Like eradication programs, interdiction pushes traffickers into remote areas where they exacerbate preexisting pressures on forestland. Traffickers use slash and burn practices to convert forest into arable land for cash crop production for the purposes of money laundering as well as the construction of clandestine roads and airstrips. the war on drugs and prohibitionist policies only serve to aggravate the already detrimental impacts of narco-trafficking on Central American forests. Intensified ecological devastation across cultivation and trafficking zones is yet another negative unintended consequence of emphasis on supply-side narcotic reduction borne by poor countries.

==== User cost of drugs ====
When the cost of drugs increases, drug users are more likely to commit crimes in order to obtain money to buy the expensive drugs. Legalizing drugs would make drugs reasonably cheap.

== Discriminatory ==
=== Arguments for inconsistent drug laws ===
In response to the issue of consistency with regard to drug prohibition and the dangers of alcohol former director of the ONDCP John P. Walters, has said, "It's ludicrous to say we have a great deal of problems from the use of alcohol so we should multiply that with marijuana".

=== Arguments against inconsistent drug laws ===
Since alcohol prohibition ended and the war on drugs began there has been much debate over the issue of consistency among legislators with regard to drug prohibition. Many anti-prohibition activists focus on the well-documented dangers of alcohol (such as alcoholism, cystitis, domestic violence, brain and liver damage). In addition to anecdotal evidence, they cite statistics to show more deaths caused by drunk driving under the influence of alcohol than by drivers under the influence of marijuana, and research which suggests that alcohol is more harmful than all but the most "dangerous" drugs. When the level of harm associated with the other drugs includes harm that arises solely as a result of the drugs illegality rather than merely that danger which is associated with actually using the drugs, only heroin, cocaine, barbiturates and street methadone were shown to be more harmful than the legal drug alcohol.

A 2002 DAWN report, for the USA records two possible drug-induced deaths where marijuana was the only drug found. Legal drugs however, have been the cause of more than half a million deaths a year: 480,000 from tobacco smoking-related illnesses and 80,000 from alcohol use disorder. Together, tobacco and alcohol cause about 20% of all yearly deaths in the USA.

It is argued that inconsistency between the harm caused and the legal status of these common drugs undermines the declared motives of the law enforcement agencies to reduce harm by prohibition, for example of marijuana.

In February 2009, the UK government was accused by its most senior expert drugs adviser Professor David Nutt of making political decisions with regard to drug classification, for example in rejecting the scientific advice to downgrade ecstasy from a class A drug. The Advisory Council on the Misuse of Drugs (ACMD) report on ecstasy, based on a 12-month study of 4,000 academic papers, concluded that it is nowhere near as dangerous as other class A drugs such as heroin and crack cocaine, and should be downgraded to class B. The advice was not followed. Jacqui Smith, then Home Secretary, was also widely criticised by the scientific community for bullying Professor David Nutt into apologising for his comments that, in the course of a normal year, more people died from falling off horses than died from taking ecstasy. Professor Nutt was later sacked by Jacqui Smith's successor as Home Secretary Alan Johnson; Johnson saying "It is important that the government's messages on drugs are clear and as an advisor you do nothing to undermine public understanding of them. I cannot have public confusion between scientific advice and policy and have therefore lost confidence in your ability to advise me as Chair of the ACMD."

==== Consistency between drugs ====
In the United States, defendants convicted of selling crack cocaine receive equal sentences to those convicted of selling 100 times the same amount of powder cocaine. This disparity was lessened during the Obama administration when the Fair Sentencing Act 2010 changed the ratio to 18 to 1. The majority of offenders convicted for selling crack are poor and/or black, while the majority of those convicted for selling cocaine are not.

==== Same policy for distinct drugs ====
Many drug policies group all illegal drugs into a single category. Since drugs drastically vary in their effects, addictive potential, dosages, methods of production, and consumption the arguments either way could be seen as inconsistent.

==== Race and enforcement of drug laws ====
It has been alleged that current drug laws are enforced in such a way as to penalize non-whites more harshly and more often than whites, and to penalize the poor of all races more harshly and more often than the middle and upper classes. For example, up until 2012, crack cocaine carried penalties one hundred times more severe than cocaine despite the fact that these drugs are essentially identical. Especially in urban black communities, convictions were nearly exclusively for crack, while cocaine use is statistically much higher among affluent whites.

== Civil rights ==
=== Civil rights arguments for prohibitive drug laws ===
Article 33 of the United Nations Convention on the Rights of the Child reads:

States Parties shall take all appropriate measures, including legislative, administrative, social and educational measures, to protect children from the illicit use of narcotic drugs and psychotropic substances as defined in the relevant international treaties and to prevent the use of children in the illicit production and trafficking of such substances.

Drug Free Australia argues:

The notion that illicit drug use is a victimless crime and that everyone should be free to do what they want with their body disregards the web of social interactions that constitute human existence. Affected by an individual's illicit drug use are children, parents, grandparents, friends, colleagues, work, victims of drugged drivers, crime victims, elder abuse, sexual victims etc. Illicit drug use is no less victimless than alcoholism.

Drug Free Australia gives the example that in 2007 one in every nine children under the age of 18 in the United States lived with at least one drug dependent or drug abusing parent. 2.1 million children in the United States live with at least one parent who was dependent on or used illicit drugs.

The Christian Institute argues that there is no point in having criminal laws unless those caught breaking them will at least face prosecution. Less serious offenses, such as failing to complete a census form, may also attract a criminal record, so the contention that criminalizing drug use is draconian can be seen as overstatement.

"Parental substance dependence and abuse can have profound effects on children, including child abuse and neglect, injuries and deaths related to motor vehicle accidents, and increased odds that the children will become substance dependent or abusers themselves. Up-to-date estimates of the number of children living with substance-dependent or substance-abusing parents are needed for planning both adult treatment and prevention efforts and programs that support and protect affected children."

Drug Free Australia concludes any democratic society that deems the use of a certain drug to present unacceptable harm to the individual user, to present unacceptable harm to the users' surrounding community or to transfer too great a burden to the community will seek legislation which will curb that particular freedom of the individual.

Sweden's centre-right alliance government Moderate Party advocates "Zero tolerance for crime", arguing:

Few things restrict people's freedom as much as the consequences of violence, drugs and criminality in society.

— The Swedish Moderate Party (June 2006). Zero tolerance for crime – policy summary published prior to the Swedish general election in 2006.

Many people argue that only drug dealers should be fought and not the drug users themselves. But it is the users themselves that are mostly responsible for recruiting new users through networks of friends or relatives leading some to conclude that users need to be targeted as the recruiters of new drug use, and that an emphasis on early rehabilitation for young users is the best answer to curbing widespread dealing. Sweden's mandatory rehabilitation program has resulted in the lowest drug use levels in the developed world.

The freedom of choice of those addicted to a drug is also questioned, recognizing that addiction is defined as compulsive by its very nature and that addictions in and of themselves curb individual freedom. Likewise, it has been argued that addictive drugs should not be legalized, regulated and opened to "free market dynamics" because the drug market for an addict is no longer a free market; addicted individuals will pay any price when needing their drug.

=== Civil rights arguments for drug law reform ===
==== Cognitive liberty ====
Authors such as Aldous Huxley and Terence McKenna believed that what persons do in private should not be regulated by the government. It is argued that persons should be able to do whatever they want with their bodies, including the recreational use of drugs, as long as they do not harm others. Such arguments often cite the harm principle of philosopher John Stuart Mill who urged that the state had no right to intervene to prevent individuals from doing something that harmed them, if no harm was thereby done to the rest of society: 'Over himself, over his own body and mind, the individual is sovereign' and 'The only purpose for which power can be rightfully exercised over any member of a civilized community, against his will, is to prevent harm to others. His own good, either physical or moral, is not sufficient warrant.' The argument is that drug use is a victimless crime and as such the government has no right to prohibit it or punish drug consumers, much like the government does not forbid overeating, which causes significantly more deaths per year. This can be equated with the quest for freedom of thought.

==== Spiritual and religious ====
We're playing with half a deck as long as we tolerate that the cardinals of government and science should dictate where human curiosity can legitimately send its attention and where it can not. It's an essentially preposterous situation. It is essentially a civil rights issue, because what we're talking about here is the repression of a religious sensibility. In fact, not a religious sensibility, the religious sensibility.

— Terence McKenna in: Non-Ordinary States Through Vision Plants, Sound Photosynthesis, Mill Valley CA., 1988, ISBN 1-56964-709-7

Some religious groups including the União do Vegetal, the Native American Church, the Bwiti religion and the Rastafari movement (see religious and spiritual use of cannabis) use psychoactive substances as sacrament in religious rituals. In some religious practice, drugs are sometimes used as a conduit to an oceanic feeling or divine union, equated with mysticism or entheogenic ('that which causes God to be within an individual') experiences. In others, the 'entactogenic' qualities of drugs are used to enhance feelings of empathy among congregations.

==== Personal development and exploration ====
Some people believe that altered states of consciousness enable many people to push the boundaries of human experience, knowledge, and creativity. There is thus a moral imperative to use drugs in terms of human progress, teleological development, or just increased artistic creativity; such ideas are central to Cognitive Liberty, Stoned Ape Hypothesis and Aldous Huxley's The Doors of Perception.

In PiHKAL, Alexander Shulgin, argues that the psychedelics help us learn about ourselves; indeed that is where the name "psychedelic" (mind expanding) comes from.

I am completely convinced that there is a wealth of information built into us, with miles of intuitive knowledge tucked away in the genetic material of every one of our cells. Something akin to a library containing uncountable reference volumes, but without any obvious route of entry. And, without some means of access, there is no way to even begin to guess the extent and quality of what is there. The psychedelic drugs allow exploration of this interior world, and insights into its nature.

— Alexander Shulgin in: PiHKAL, Introduction p. xvi, Transform Press, CA., 1991, ISBN 0-9630096-0-5

== Moral and ethical reasons ==
=== Moral arguments for drug law reform ===
Many people, including some religious groups, argue that the war on drugs is itself immoral.

In 2007, Richard Brunstrom, the Chief Constable of North Wales, one of Britain's most senior police officers, said "If policy on drugs is in future to be pragmatic not moralistic, driven by ethics not dogma, then the current prohibitionist stance will have to be swept away as both unworkable and immoral, to be replaced with an evidence-based unified system (specifically including tobacco and alcohol) aimed at minimisation of harms to society."

The author and physician Andrew Weil has commented on the peculiar attitude and emotional bias of some people who think "drug taking is bad", but who nevertheless consume alcohol, and formulate the unhelpful conception "We drink. Therefore alcohol is not a drug."

The UK drug policy reform group Release believe that the stigma attached to drug use needs to be removed. Release's actions have included challenging such stigmatisation with its "Nice People Take Drugs" advertising campaign.

== Political ==
=== Sending out signals ===
==== Arguments for sending out signals ====
Some argue that sending out signals should be a consideration of drug policy. Previous UK Home Office Minister Vernon Coaker argued "is not part of any system with respect to drugs ... not only trying to send messages out to people who misuse drugs but also about trying to send messages out to people out there in the community?"

In response to the UK government's official drugs advisory body's opposition to cannabis reclassification (upwards, from a class C to a class B drug) in 2008, prime minister Gordon Brown said: "I believe that if we're sending out a signal, particularly to teenagers – and particular those at the most vulnerable age, young teenagers – that in any way we find cannabis acceptable, given all we know about the way that cannabis is being sold in this country, that is not the right thing to do. There's a stronger case now for sending out a signal that cannabis is not only illegal, it's unacceptable."

==== Arguments against sending out signals ====
The Science and Technology Select Committee appointed by the House of Commons to inquire into the Government's handling of scientific advice, risk and evidence in policy making agreed with Transform Drug Policy Foundation's view that "Criminal law is supposed to prevent crime, not 'send out' public health messages". Transform warned that sending out signals could backfire by "fostering distrust of police and public health messages amongst young people". The Select Committee's report said "The Government's desire to use the Class of a particular drug to send out a signal to potential users or dealers does not sit comfortably with the claim that the primary objective of the classification system is to categorise drugs according to the comparative harm associated with their misuse. It is also incompatible with the Government's stated commitment to evidence based policy making since it has never undertaken research to establish the relationship between the Class of a drug and the signal sent out and there is, therefore, no evidence base on which to draw in making these policy decisions."

=== Political calculation ===
==== Arguments for political calculation ====
John Donnelly, writing for the Boston Globe on the presidential race of 2000, suggested that the candidates' silence on drug policy may stem from a widely shared belief that any position even hinting at reducing penalties for drug use would be political suicide. Charles R. Schuster, director of the National Institute on Drug Abuse under Presidents Reagan and Bush (Snr.), was reported as saying in 1997, "Talking sense about drug policy in today's climate of opinion can be political suicide."

Drug policy academic Mark A.R. Kleiman has argued:

There are things we can do about drug policy that would reduce the number of people in prison, and the extent of drug abuse and drug related crime. Legalization isn't one of them because there's not public support for it. And if we acknowledge the fact that, from the point of view of the majority of the population it's a loser, then it's not as if we can talk them out of that, so I think the legalization debate is mostly a distraction from doing the real work of fixing our drug policies

— Scott Morgan, quoting Mark Kleiman, Rule #1 of Drug Legalization is Don't Talk About Drug Legalization, Drug Reform Coordination Network, February 2008.

Scott Morgan reports how he once attended a discussion of Peter Reuter and David Boyum's book An Analytic Assessment of U.S. Drug Policy, in which the authors admitted ignoring the legalization option in their analysis. Boyum claimed that there was no legitimate political support for ending the drug war and that he and Reuter had therefore confined themselves to recommendations that they thought were politically viable.

==== Arguments against political calculation ====
The deaths of two teenage boys in the United Kingdom in March 2010 sparked a nationwide controversy over the amphetamine drug mephedrone, which had gained popularity as a legal high. The Advisory Council on the Misuse of Drugs (ACMD) recommended a ban on the drug, which was quickly passed into law, but the decision was criticised for being politically rather than scientifically driven and led to the resignation of the ACMD's Eric Carlin, the eighth member of the council to leave in five months in protest at what was seen as political interference. Toxicology reports released in May revealed that the boys had never taken the drug. In a later commentary, David Nutt noted that the pharmacology of mephedrone was not known at the time it was banned, and that the decision was so knee-jerk that the ACMD accidentally banned the wrong enantiomer for about a year.

Professor Colin Blakemore, professor of neuroscience at the University of Oxford, said: "This shocking news should be a salutary lesson to tabloid journalists and prejudiced politicians who held a gun to the heads of the ACMD and demanded that this drug should be banned before a single autopsy had been completed ... The politicians talk about using drug classification as a way of sending 'messages' to young people. I fear that the only message that will be sent by the hasty decision on mephedrone is that the drug laws deserve no respect."

Professor David Nutt, the former chairman of the ACMD, said: "the previous government's rush to ban mephedrone never had any serious scientific credibility – it looks much more like a decision based on a short-term electoral calculation. This news demonstrates why it's so important to base drug classification on the evidence, not fear, and why the police, media and politicians should only make public pronouncements once the facts are clear."

== Public opinion ==
=== Public opinion on prohibitive drug laws ===
A direct example of societal attitudes driving the International Drug Conventions is the 1925 speech by the Egyptian delegate M. El Guindy to the 1925 Geneva Convention forum which prohibited cannabis – largely reproduced in Willoughby, W. W.; In the late 19th and early 20th century drug use was regarded by the public "as alone a habit, vice, sign of weakness or dissipation", similar to the view of those who could not control their use of the licit drug alcohol. The use of illicit drugs has been prohibited internationally since 1912, an entire century, because of international agreement that the general community has a greater right to protect itself from the harms of illicit drug use than does an individual user to use a harmful substance recreationally.

Currently there is still greater public support for the continued prohibiting of illicit drug use than there is for legalizing and regulating the use of these substances. In the United States 82% of those polled by the Family Research Association in 1998 were opposed to the legalization of heroin and cocaine in the same manner as alcohol is legal. In October 2009 a Gallup poll found that 54% of those polled were against the legalization of cannabis. In Australia, which has had the highest levels of illicit drug use in Organisation for Economic Co-operation and Development (or OECD) countries for more than a decade, according to a 2007 survey, 95% of Australians do not support the legalization of heroin, cocaine and amphetamines, and 79% do not support the legalization of cannabis.

It can be argued that the negative attitudes to illicit drug use which issued in the international drug Conventions, with prohibitions against their use 100 years ago, still exist today. Taking again statistics from Australia, 97% disapprove of the regular use of heroin, 96% disapprove the regular use of amphetamines or cocaine, and 76.5% disapprove of the regular use of cannabis. In any democracy where "the will of the people" is respected by its political representatives, the prohibition of these substance might well be expected to remain intact.

=== Public opinion on drug law reform ===
According to Transform Drug Policy Foundation, over the past decade there has been strong shift in public opinion in favour of drug policy reform. This shift has taken place despite successive government's reluctance to consider or debate the subject, or even call to for an independent inquiry.

A national telephone survey conducted in 1993 found that between 52% and 55% of Australians believed that growing and possessing cannabis for personal use should be legalised.

An ICM poll of 1201 people for The Guardian in 1998 found that 47% believed that the illegality of drugs actually encourages young people to try them.

46% of UK adults in a 2002 Guardian poll (of 1075) felt that drug addicts who register themselves as such should have access to certain illegal drugs via prescription.

An ICM poll of 1008 UK adults (aged 16+) for The Guardian in 2008 found that 38% would support a scheme, similar to that established in Portugal and Spain, whereby it is not a criminal offence to possess and use drugs privately.

Following President Barack Obama's win of the 2008 presidential election, Change.gov hosted a service on their website named the Citizen's Briefing Book allowing United States citizens to give their opinion on the most important issues in America, and allow others to vote up or down on those ideas. The top ten ideas are to be given to Obama on the day of his inauguration, January 20, 2009. The most popular idea according to respondents was "Ending Marijuana Prohibition", earning 92,970 points and obtaining a total of 3,550 comments. The second most popular hope, by contrast, was "Commit to becoming the "Greenest" country in the world." with 70,470 points.

Marijuana has seen a renaissance in its utopian representation in films such as the suburban satire American Beauty (1999, dir. Sam Mendes) and the stoner comedy Pineapple Express (2008, dir. David Gordon Green). Another venue for contemporary criticism of marijuana prohibition is television, such as the Showtime series Weeds (2005–2012, dev. Jenji Kohan); the HBO series True Blood (2008–2014, dev. Alan Ball); and adult animation shows such as South Park, Family Guy, and American Dad!.

David Simon, creator of the television series The Wire, in 2011 told U.S. Attorney General Eric Holder that he'd "give him another season of the HBO show for an end to the war on drugs." Holder had invited show stars Wendell Pierce, Sonja Sohn, and Jim True-Frost to Washington on behalf of an anti-drug public relations campaign and at the time called on Simon and Ed Burns for another season or a movie of the show. Simon replied via a letter to a newspaper offering the trade.

In November 2020, 76 percent of voters in Washington D.C. voted in favor of the initiative to decriminalize psychedelic plants and fungi.

== See also ==
- Altered state of consciousness
- Chasing the Scream
- Cognitive liberty
- Darknet market
- Demand reduction
- Dagga Couple
- Drug addiction
- Drug Policy Alliance
- Drug policy of Sweden
- Drug policy of the Netherlands
- Drug policy of Portugal
- Drug possession
- FAAAT think & do tank
- Freedom of thought
- Harm reduction
- Illegal drug trade
- Law Enforcement Against Prohibition
- NORML, National Organization to Reform Marijuana Laws.
- Neurotheology
- Perverse incentive
- Prohibition (drugs)
- Recreational drug use
- The Rhetoric of Drugs
- Think of the children
- War on drugs
- Zero tolerance
