= Antipsychotic abuse =

Harmful use of antipsychotic medications

Antipsychotic abuse refers to the non-medical or inappropriate use of antipsychotic medications for purposes other than their intended therapeutic use. Antipsychotics, also known as neuroleptics, are a class of medications primarily used in treating psychiatric disorders such as schizophrenia, bipolar disorder, and certain types of depression.

The misuse and abuse (MUA) of pharmaceuticals are typically linked to medications that elicit euphoria or other desirable effects, such as relaxation or increased alertness. Consequently, antipsychotics are not commonly categorized as significant substances prone to abuse. However, antipsychotics abuse may be attributed to its calming and sedative effects, and they have been exploited to either enhance the effects of illicit substances like cocaine and marijuana or counteract their adverse consequences. Due to the potential of physical, social, and psychological consequences in patients using antipsychotics, the prevention and protection of these patient populations from the MUA of drugs has been implemented via various legislations worldwide which differ depending on the local jurisdiction.

== Classifications ==
=== Types of abuse ===
Individuals may misuse and abuse antipsychotics for various reasons, including recreational purposes, self-medication, or attempting to alter their mental or emotional state. The most common forms of antipsychotic abuse may include non-prescribed use, which involves the use of antipsychotic medications without a valid legal prescription or the absence of medical supervision. This can involve obtaining medication from other individuals, sharing prescription drugs, or acquiring them through illicit means.

Additionally, the misuse of prescribed medication can also involve using antipsychotics in a manner inconsistent with the prescribed indications. This includes taking higher dosages than recommended, increasing the dosing frequency, using them for longer durations than the prescribed treatment timespan as well as using medications prescribed to someone else. The combined or concurrent use of antipsychotics with other substances to enhance or alter the effects is also considered a form of abuse. This can involve combining them with alcohol, illicit drugs, or other prescription medications, which can have unpredictable and potentially dangerous interactions.

=== Classification of antipsychotics ===
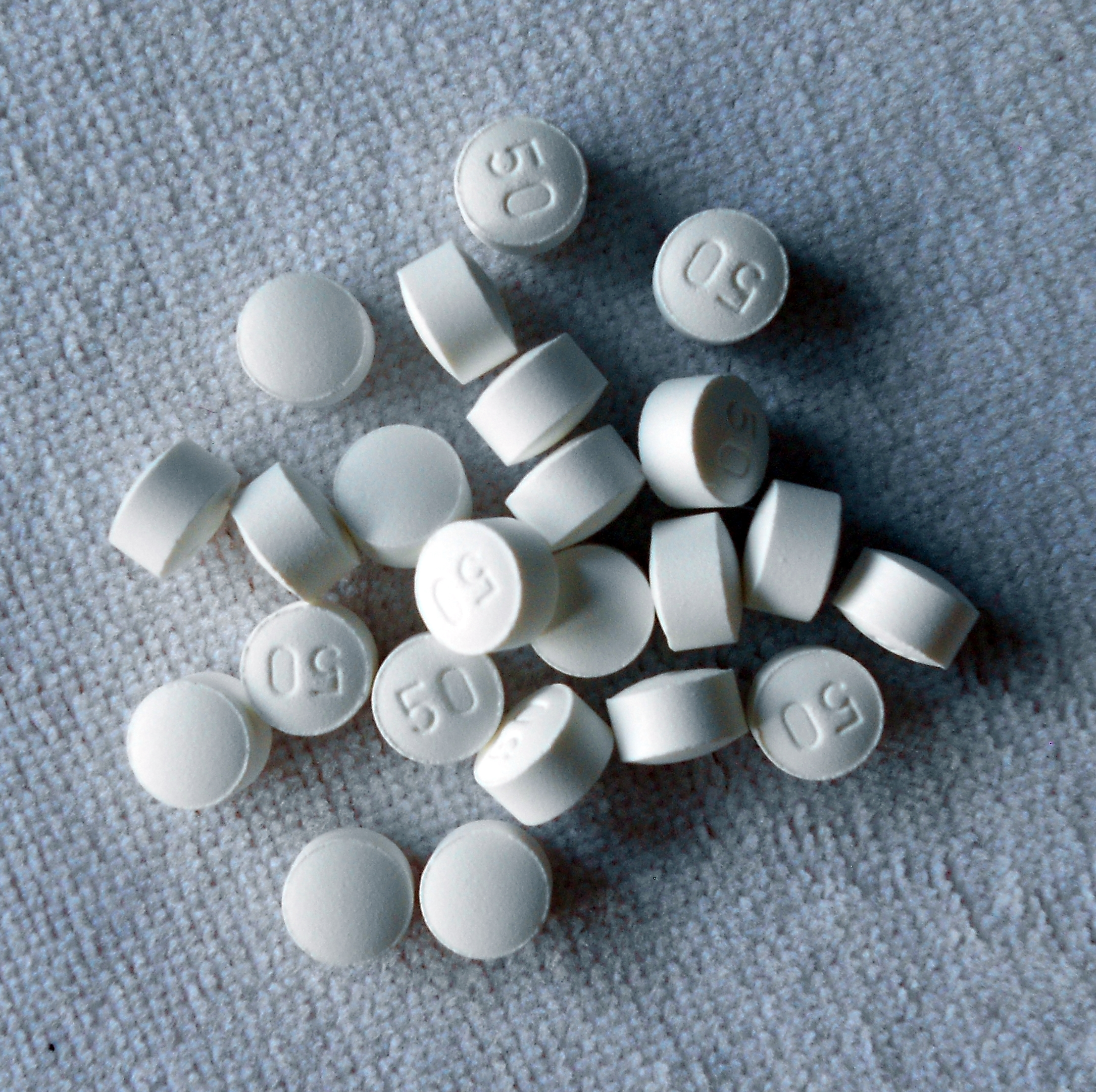
An atypical antipsychotic: Quetiapine Fumarate 50mg

There are two categories of oral antipsychotic drugs: typical; the first-generation antipsychotics and atypical; the new generation. Typical antipsychotics include Chlorpromazine, Fluphenazine, Haloperidol, and Trifluoperazine. Atypical antipsychotics include Amisulpride, Aripiprazole, Clozapine, Olanzapine, Paliperidone, and Quetiapine. While both types of antipsychotic drugs are effective, the main differences are that atypical ones generally have fewer side effects compared to typical ones. These side-effects may include the onset of extrapyramidal motor symptoms which in the long term may cause a condition called tardive dyskinesia, which involves involuntary movements of the mouth, tongue, face, jaw, and sometimes other body parts. Atypical antipsychotics have also shown an increased risk of weight gain, diabetes, and cardiovascular disease.

=== Reasons for abuse and affected populations ===
The misuse of atypical antipsychotics can be attributed to various factors. From a pharmacological perspective, the involvement of neurotransmitter systems such as serotonin, histamine, and α-adrenergic systems is of significant importance. Quetiapine, a specific second-generation antipsychotic (SGAP), exhibits distinct pharmacological effects depending on the dosage administered. At lower doses, it primarily acts as an antagonist for histamine (H1) and serotonin receptors, resulting in an elevation of synaptic serotonin levels. This mechanism contributes to the sedative effects associated with H1 antagonism and the anxiolytic effects mediated by α-blockade. These sedating and anxiolytic properties are considered to be the primary drivers of misuse.

Results from a study which analysed the World Health Organization (WHO) Global Individual Case Safety Report (ICSR) database VigiBase, a worldwide pharmacovigilance database on antipsychotic misuse, show that out of a total of 2096 ICSRs which fall under the subgroup of “Drug abuse, dependence and withdrawal”, 1683 involved SGAPs (80%), mainly quetiapine (1089 ICSRs) and olanzapine (209 ICSRs). Further analysis showed that the major characteristics of quetiapine misuse mainly involved women with a mean age of 47 ± 15 years and olanzapine misuse mainly associated with men with a mean age of 43 ± 14 years. The study also noted that the trend in the misuse of SGAPs from 1993 to 2017 started to increase from 2009 with a peak in 2015 which confirms the significance of misuse in recent years.

Outcomes of abuse involved severe outcomes, such as hospitalisation or prolonged illness, mortality, life-threatening risks, and lasting effects. Within the VigiBase ICSRs, reasons for misuse included the off-label usage of SGAPs for sleeping disorders, and anxiety. Combining quetiapine or olanzapine with other medications included antidepressants, opioids, and anxiolytics. Additionally, both drugs have been found to be used in combination with illicit substances, primarily heroin and cocaine.

Indicators of the escalating street value of SGAPs is evident in the growing number of street names associated with the two drug, including quell, Susie Q, baby heroin, and squirrel for quetiapine and Zy for olanzapine. The black market value for quetiapine tablets are being sold illicitly at prices ranging from $3 to $8 per tablet. There has also been reports of both drugs extending past the traditional oral route of administration to using it intra-nasally (snorting) and injection also known as Q-ball which is the concomitant administration of cocaine with quetiapine.

== Signs and symptoms ==
The wide variability in the toxic and lethal doses of antipsychotics is largely dependent on factors such as the actual drug compound, patient age, weight and the presence of co-intoxicants. However, the most frequent clinical presentations revolve around Central nervous system (CNS) effects, extrapyramidal side effects (EPS) and neuroleptic malignant syndrome which is more commonly seen in children. CNS side effects include: Miosis, rapid mood fluctuations (depression and agitation), seizures and coma. Anticholinergic side effects include: blurred vision, dry mouth, facial flushing and decreased sweating. Some cardiopulmonary side effects include: Tachycardia, palpitations, respiratory depression, and chest pain.

Adverse effects of antipsychotic medications
	Weight gain	Parkinsonism	Tardive Dyskinesia	Sedation	Anticholinergic	QTc prolongation
First-generation antipsychotics
Chlorpromazine	++	++	+++	+++	+++	+++
Fluphenazine	++	+++	+++	+	+	+
Haloperidol	++	+++	+++	+	+	Oral: ++ IV: +++
Trifluoperazine	++	++	++	+	++	n/a
Second-generation antipsychotic agents
Aripiprazole	+	+	+	+	+	n/a
Clozapine	+++	+	+	+++	+++	++
Olanzapine	+++	++	+	+++	++	++
Paliperidone	++	++	++	+	+	+
Quetiapine	++	+	+	+++	++	++
(+): Mild significance, (++): Moderate significance (+++): Strong significance

== Assessment and Treatment ==
=== Total Daily Dose (TDD) Calculator ===
The TDD is a tool used to assess potential antipsychotic misuse. It allows clinicians to calculate the total daily dosage of antipsychotic medications prescribed to patients based on guidelines from the British National Formulary (BNF).

The calculator determines a patient's TDD by accounting for the specific antipsychotic drug(s), dosing frequency, and dosage amounts for both monotherapy (single drug) and polypharmacy (multiple drugs). It then compares the calculated TDD to standard dosing recommendations in the BNF.

If the TDD exceeds guidelines outlined in the BNF or if the combination of individual drug dosages exceeds 100% of the maximum recommended daily amounts, the calculator flags this as a high dosage regimen which could indicate antipsychotic misuse or over prescription. By objectively quantifying total dosage levels, the TDD Calculator aims to help clinicians evaluate prescribing practices and identify situations where dosage reductions may be warranted to minimize health risks for patients.

=== General Management of Antipsychotic Overdose ===
Currently, there is no specific antidote for the treatment of antipsychotic overdose. The general protocol for the treatment of antipsychotic overdose involves primary supportive care, decontamination with enhanced elimination techniques such as using gastric lavage and activated charcoal. Specific anticholinergic side effects can be targeted by using anti-cholinergic agents. Every patient should be on continuous cardiac monitoring with an ECG done, intravenous (IV) access, and the constant reevaluation of changes in mental state.

Primary supportive care protocol involves the ABC approach which focuses on reversing any signs of airway obstruction (A), ensuring respiratory rate and breathing parameters are normal (B) and to assess the circulation of blood is normal to prevent hypovolemic shock (C). Whenever the patient is hemodynamically stable, a single dose of activated charcoal is recommended. The onset of acute extrapyramidal symptoms due to antipsychotic overdose can be treated with anticholinergic agents, such as diphenhydramine or benztropine. Patients with neuroleptic malignant syndrome require supportive care, include active cooling to prevent overheating, benzodiazepines, bromocriptine, or neuromuscular blockade, depending upon the severity of symptoms.

== Societal Impacts ==
Antipsychotic abuse has grown increasingly more prevalent worldwide and has brought about various negative impacts to the society.

=== Death and Hospitalization ===
In the study examining 1683 patients with second-generation antipsychotic misuse extracted from WHO pharmacovigilance database, 24% were hospitalized. More importantly, the death rate was at 28%, which was higher than that of hospitalization by 4%. This means that patients may risk of death before arriving at the hospital to receive any treatments with the misuse of SGAPs.

In addition to the high mortality rate, extra hospital services and medical resources were allocated to offset the negative effects of antipsychotic MUA. Research shows that non-adherence to antipsychotic medication would lead to increased number of relapses, being persistent psychotic and an enhanced risk of hospital admission in psychotic conditions. For instance, in a schizophrenic patient study group that assumes 90% of them comply to their medication at inclusion, more than 50% of the patients admitted to the hospital were non-compliant to their at-home antipsychotic dosage regimen. By contrast, adherent patients tend to have better medical outcomes and improvements in Global Assessment of Functioning level across the two years.

=== Adverse reactions and suicidal attempt ===
In general, there were several issues posed by antipsychotic abuse with regards to their adverse reactions.

1. Antipsychotic polypharmacy would increase frequency of adverse effects, and
2. A longer duration of treatment results in more severe the adverse reactions (e.g. high BMI)
3. Some antipsychotics are more associated with specific metabolic disturbances (e.g. Clozapine)
4. Several studies provided adverse effect management strategies while little examined their efficacy

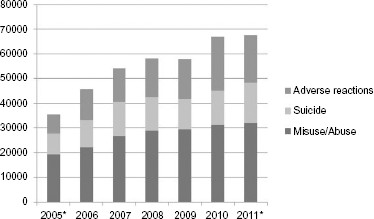
Trends of ED visits due to different causes from 2005-2011 for patients above 12 years old

Quetiapine-related emergency department visits increased by 90% from 2005 to 2011, according to Drug Abuse Warning Network (DAWN).

About half of these admissions are due to MUA of antipsychotics whereas a quarter to a third of these visits are attributed to suicidal attempts or adverse reactions. The association of quetiapine with suicidal attempts is still unclear. Some propose higher dosage of quetiapine for those with suicidal intent. Some proposed the mix of substances causes more detrimental effects to patients. Some propose hospital stay is more likely for suicidal cause for patient stabilization or medication adjustment. However, following the adverse events, patients overall reported a significantly lower satisfaction of quality of life than asymptomatic patients. This may be one potential reason of the suicidal attempt.

== Legal Approaches ==
=== Canada ===
Canada has implemented several strategies to manage the use of antipsychotic medications:

==== Health Canada Advisories ====
From 2005, the indications of atypical antipsychotics medication for behavioral disease in elderly patient with dementia are removed. It is required for manufacturers in Canada to include a warning of this risk in their Product Monograph describing this risk and noting that these drugs (except for RISPERDAL) are not approved for treating behavioral disorders in elderly patients with dementia.

RISPERDAL (Risperidone) is the exception among the atypical antipsychotics that still could be used for short-term symptomatic management of inappropriate behavior due to aggression and/or psychosis in patients with severe dementia.

==== Prescription Drug Monitoring Programs (PDMPs) ====
The programs are established in Canada to oversee prescription patterns and identify potential abuse. The universal database can keep track of the appropriateness of prescribing such as doses, refills frequencies and check if any overlapping prescription.

==== Informed Consent ====
Canadian law requires informed consent for the use of any medication, including antipsychotics, especially when used off-label or in populations like the elderly.

=== United Kingdom ===
==== Mental Health Act 1983 ====
The Mental Health Act 1983 is a legislation system which governs the administration of antipsychotic drugs to patients without their consent in certain circumstances. The Act is designed to protect the rights and well-being of individuals with mental disorders, ensuring that safety and appropriateness of treatments are maintained.

Under the Act, the Medicines and Healthcare products Regulatory Agency (MHRA) regulates the safety and efficacy of medications, including antipsychotics. The National Institute for Health and Care Excellence (NICE) provides comprehensive guidelines for the use of antipsychotic medications across different mental health conditions.

===== Key Sections of the Mental Health Act related to antipsychotic misuse =====
Section 63: States that consent is not required for the treatment of a patient's mental disorder if it is given under the direction of the clinician in charge, except where treatments are specified under sections 57 or 58.

Section 57: Specifies that certain treatments, like brain surgery, require consent from the patient and a second medical opinion. The Secretary of State can also specify other treatments through regulations.

Section 58: Stipulates that some treatments require either patient consent or a second medical opinion if the patient cannot consent. The Secretary of State can specify which treatments are covered by this section.

Patients under specific conditions that match with the sections mentioned above, then consent is not required for getting an optimal treatment.

=== United States ===
In the United States, several measures are in place to prevent antipsychotic abuse:

==== Black Box Warnings ====
Since 2005, Black Box Warnings established by the FDA that antipsychotic medications package requires to carry "black box" warnings, the most severe type of warning, about the risk of mortality in older adults with dementia-related psychosis.

==== Preferred antipsychotics medication ====
There is a list of preferred antipsychotics medications provided for the prescriber that the drug can be prescribed without prior authorization as long as the dose and frequency is within the recommendation of FDA. This helps to prevent the overdose of antipsychotic uses of patients.

==== Peer Review Project ====
Antipsychotic peer review project is established to regulate the prescription of antipsychotics to children who aged beyond the FDA -approved age for that medication. Prior authorization by pediatric specialists to ensure appropriateness of prescription. To optimize the children’s care plan, evaluations and discussions are conducted between specialist and prescriber about the treatment choices, risks/benefits, monitoring needs, and non-medication alternatives, which this process is described as peer review.

=== Differences in antipsychotic drug approvals between the United States and United Kingdom ===
The approval processes and standards from regulatory bodies in the United Kingdom (UK) and United States (US) are different, therefore the drug approval varies. Variations in the following can impact the patterns of off-label and antipsychotic misuse between the two regions.

==== Pediatric approvals ====
Some first-generation antipsychotics like haloperidol and chlorpromazine are approved down to children in the US, but not in the UK. Wider pediatric indications could increase misuse risks if not closely monitored.

==== Unapproved drugs ====
Amisulpride is widely used in the UK despite lacking US approval, where comparable alternatives would require off-label prescribing. Unapproved status can hamper safety monitoring.

==== Indications ====
Variations in the indication of a drug may differ between two regions. Based on table 2, there is a broader indication of Olanzapine use in the US. It is approved for treatment-resistant depression and agitation besides of bipolar and Schizophrenia. Whereas in UK, it is only for bipolar and schizophrenia.

=== Approval list of antipsychotics medication in UK and US ===
The tables below show the drugs approved with different indication and the indicated patient age group(s).

UK approved first-generation antipsychotic medications
Drug name	Indication	Age group
Chlorpromazine	Schizophrenia, mania	Adults only
Flupentixol	Schizophrenia, mania	Adults only
Fluphenazine	Schizophrenia, mania	Adults only
Haloperidol	Schizophrenia, mania	Adults only
Pericyazine	Schizophrenia, mania	Adults only
Pimozide	Tourette's syndrome	Adults and children
Sulpiride	Schizophrenia, mania	Adults only
Zuclopenthixol	Schizophrenia, mania	Adults only

UK approved second-generation antipsychotic medication
Drug name	Indication	Age group
Amisulpride	Schizophrenia, mania	Adults only
Aripiprazole	Schizophrenia, mania, bipolar disorder	Adults and adolescents (15–17 years)
Olanzapine	Schizophrenia, mania, bipolar disorder	Adults and adolescents (13–17 years)
Paliperidone	Schizophrenia	Adults only
Quetiapine	Schizophrenia, bipolar disorder, major depressive disorder	Adults and adolescents (13–17 years)
Risperidone	Schizophrenia, bipolar disorder, irritability associated with autism	Adults and children/adolescents (13–17 years, 5–17 years)
Ziprasidone	Schizophrenia, mania	Adults only

Food and Drug Administration-approved first-generation antipsychotics
Generic name	Indications	Age group for which approved
Chlorpromazine	Schizophrenia	Adults and children (1–12 years)
Chlorpromazine	Bipolar disorder (mania)	Adults and children (1–12 years)
Chlorpromazine	Hyperactivity	Adults and children (1–12 years)
Chlorpromazine	Severe behavioral problems	Adults and children (1–12 years)
Droperidol	Agitation	Adults and children
Fluphenazine	Psychotic disorders	Adults
Haloperidol	Schizophrenia	Adults
Haloperidol	Tourette syndrome	Adults
Haloperidol	Hyperactivity	Adults
Haloperidol	Severe childhood behavioral problems	Adults
Loxapine	Schizophrenia	Adults and children ≥12 years
Perphenazine	Schizophrenia	Adults and children ≥12 years
Pimozide	Tourette syndrome	Adults and children ≥12 years
Prochlorperazine	Schizophrenia	Adults and children >2 years and >20 pounds
Prochlorperazine	Generalized nonpsychotic anxiety	Adults
Thiothixene	Schizophrenia	Adults and children ≥12 years
Thioridazine	Schizophrenia	Adults and children
Trifluoperazine	Schizophrenia	Adults and children ≥6 years
Trifluoperazine	Generalized nonpsychotic anxiety	Adults

Food and Drug Administration-approved second-generation antipsychotics
Generic name	Indications	Age group for which approved
Aripiprazole	Schizophrenia	Adults and adolescents (13–17 years)
Aripiprazole	Bipolar disorder (manic/mixed) monotherapy or adjunctive to lithium or valproate	Adults and children (10–17 years)
Aripiprazole	Adjunctive treatment of major depressive disorder	Adults
Aripiprazole	Irritability Associated with autistic disorder	Children (6–17 years)
Aripiprazole	Acute treatment of agitation	Adults
Asenapine	Acute schizophrenia	Adults
Asenapine	Bipolar disorder type 1 (manic/mixed)	Adults
Clozapine	Treatment resistant schizophrenia	Adults
Clozapine	Reduce the risk of suicidal behavior in younger patients with schizophrenia.	Adults
Iloperidone	Acute schizophrenia	Adults
Olanzapine	Schizophrenia Bipolar disorder (manic/mixed)	Adults and adolescents (13–17 years)
Olanzapine	Bipolar disorder	Adults
Olanzapine	Treatment resistant depression	Adults
Olanzapine	Agitation associated with schizophrenia and bipolar I mania	Adults
Paliperidone	Schizophrenia Schizoaffective disorder	Adults
Quetiapine	Schizophrenia	Adults and adolescents (13–17 years)
Quetiapine	Bipolar disorder (acute manic)	Adults, children, and adolescents (10–17 years)
Quetiapine	Bipolar disorder (depression)	Adults
Quetiapine	Bipolar disorder (maintenance)	Adults
Quetiapine	Adjunctive therapy for major depressive disorder	Adults
Risperidone	Schizophrenia	Adults and adolescents (13–17 years)
Risperidone	Bipolar disorder (manic/mixed)	Adults and adolescents (10–17 years)
Risperidone	Irritability associated with autism	Children (5–16 years)
Ziprasidone	Schizophrenia	Adults
Ziprasidone	Bipolar disorder (manic/mixed)	Adults
Ziprasidone	Bipolar disorder (maintenance)	Adults
Ziprasidone	Acute agitation in patients with schizophrenia	Adults

== Special populations ==
=== Elderly ===
==== Age group ====
Patients over the age of 50 has a higher chance of being prescribed antipsychotic medications. A study from Ghanna hospital presents that amid all the adult patients, elderly aged 50 and over presented a higher likelihood to have an antipsychotic prescription for either psychosis or off-label use, which may lead to the poly-pharmacy of antipsychotics, thus increasing the risk of exceeding the Total daily dose (TDD) and ultimately resulting in a greater risk of antipsychotic misuse

==== Adolescent Abuse ====
Antipsychotic MUA displays disproportionality in different age groups with studies revealing that out of 1023 patients below the age of 18 with antipsychotic MUA, 70% of them were between the age of 12 to 17, mainly originating from the United States (30% of the total). This disproportionality brings attention to the withdrawal symptoms in children under two years of age, deliberate misuse in children from 2 to 11 years old and abuse in adolescents from 12 to 17 years old. Such disproportionality may be attributed to the increase of off-label antipsychotic usage and the overdose issue. The intentional misuse of antipsychotics would usually result in addiction, aggressive behaviour and emotional problems within adolescents.

==== Gender ====
Several studies have found that the prevalence of antipsychotic prescription was higher among male teenagers in comparison to female teenagers. One study in Germany found that the prescription prevalence was over 3 times higher for boys than that in girls in 2011, and the rate of increase since 2008 was also higher for boys. Other research in British Columbia presented similar findings and reported the highest rise in antipsychotic prescriptions occurring among males aged 13 to 18 years from 2003 to 2012.

==== Age ====
Age also appears to influence antipsychotic prescription rates, with older adolescents from 15–17 years showing the highest prescription levels across age groups in Germany each year based on that study's data. Additionally, conditions like hyperkinetic disorder, which is more prevalent in male teenagers, may contribute to their higher antipsychotic prescription rates compared to females.

In summary, being a male teenager, as well as being in the older adolescent age range of 15–17 years, are factors that are associated with higher antipsychotic prescription prevalence according to the available research evidence.
