= Adamjee =

Adamjee may refer to:

- Adamjee Cantonment Public School
- Adamjee Cantonment College
- Adamjee Group of Companies
- Adamjee Haji Dawood

== See also ==
- Adam (disambiguation)
- Jee (disambiguation)
