= Adem (disambiguation) =

Adem is a given name and surname.

Adem may also refer to:

== Acronyms ==
- Acute disseminated encephalomyelitis
- Alabama Department of Environmental Management

== Music ==
- Adem Ilhan, an English musician who releases music under the name "Adem"

== See also ==
- Adam (disambiguation)
