= Jee =

Jee or JEE may refer to:

- Joint Entrance Examination, an Indian academic exam
- Joint External Evaluation, a World Health Organization process
- JEE, the IATA code of Jérémie Airport, Haiti
- -jee or -ji, Indian honorific
- jee, the ISO 639 code for Jerung language

== People ==
- Joe Jee (1883–1919), English footballer
- Joseph Jee (1819–1899), English surgeon
- Martha Jee, also named Martha Wong (born 1939), American politician
- Rupert Jee (born 1956), American businessman
- Jeffrey Edward Epstein (1953–2019) or "JEE", American financier and child sex offender
- Jee or Ji (Korean name), popular element in Korean names

== Other ==
- Jee-PC 400S, variant of the Skytone Alpha-400 computer
- SS Ben Jee, coastal cargo vessel
- Jakarta EE, a Java enterprise platform formerly known as Java EE or J2EE
