= ADMI =

ADMI may refer to:

- Aspen Dental Management, Inc., a corporation providing dentistry and denture care
- The American Dye Manufacturers Institute
- The American Dry Milk Institute, which became the American Dairy Products Institute through a merger with the Whey Products Institute in 1986

== See also ==
- Aadmi (disambiguation)
