= Aadmi =

Aadmi (lit. 'from Adam', transl. human) may refer to:

- Aadmi (1939 film) or Manoos, 1939 Indian drama film by V. Shantaram
- Aadmi (1968 film), a 1968 Indian Hindi-language drama film
- Aadmi (1993 film), a 1993 Indian Hindi-language film by Arshad Khan

== See also ==
- ADMI (disambiguation)
- Adam (disambiguation)
