= Balloon effect =

Criticism of United States drug policy

The balloon effect is a criticism of United States drug policy. The name draws an analogy between efforts to eradicate the production of illegal drugs in South American countries and squeezing a balloon: If a balloon is squeezed the air is moved, but does not disappear, instead moving into another area of less resistance.

== Examples ==
Examples of this displacement in drug traffic include:

- Fumigation of marijuana in Mexico caused production to migrate to Colombia.
- Marijuana crackdowns in the Sierra Nevada de Santa Marta moved activity to Cauca.
- In the late 1990s, coca was largely eradicated in Peru and Bolivia, only to be replaced by new crops in Colombia.
- Recently, with the intense spraying in the Colombian Putumayo Department, coca has been planted in other departments including Arauca, Cauca, Caquetá, Guaviare, Huila, Meta, Nariño, and Santander.

As described in The Economist:

Drug-policy geeks call this the "balloon effect": pushing down on drug production in one region causes it to bulge somewhere else. Latin Americans have a better phrase: the efecto cucaracha, or cockroach effect. You can chase the pests out of one corner of your house, but they have an irritating habit of popping up somewhere else.

Brazil and the Southern Cone (Chile, Uruguay, Paraguay, Argentina) neglected their respective drug trafficking issues and due to the concentration on the Andean region, these were neglected by the United States as well. These nations ignored the problem primarily due to its slow introduction and penetration into their society, the insistence from the U.S. that the sources of the drugs was the only problem and because the governments at the time were more concerned with foreign debt, inflation, economic growth, civil-military relations and political survival. The United States continued to increase their anti-drug operations in the Andean region resulting in displacement. This means that the U.S. tactics forced the drug traffickers to search for safer areas with less government pressure to eliminate the flow of narcotics. The drug traffickers took advantage of the neglected Southern Cone and began shifting their routes, locations for cocaine laboratories and money laundering centres. These shifts have also created growing drug consumption issues among the Southern Cone countries. While the role of the Southern Cone had been that of a transhipment point for cocaine produced in the Andean region, further evidence appeared to indicate that in fact since 1984 the region had been used extensively by Colombian and Bolivian drug traffickers. Cocaine labs were found in Northern and Western Brazil and in Argentina. It was also found that Uruguay and Chile had become major financial centres for money laundering after the invasion of Panama. Uruguay was particularly attractive as it has one of the most open banking systems in the Western Hemisphere and the government has always put great emphasis on having tight bank secrecy laws.

== Other contexts ==
- This also describes the offsetting behavior in health care when costs shift from hospital care to home care.
- A software development colloquialism, it is often used to describe the effect of fixing a bug or problem in one area of the system, where the fix itself then causes another problem to occur; fixing this subsequent issue then results in further problems, ad infinitum.
- This term is also used in business to describe situations were changes made in one area of a business lead to unforeseen and adverse effects in other parts of a business.

== See also ==
- Plan Colombia
