= The Rhetoric of Drugs =

1990 work by Jacques Derrida

"The Rhetoric of Drugs" (French: Rhétorique de la drogue) is a 1990 work by French philosopher Jacques Derrida.

Derrida, interviewed, discusses the concept of "drug", and says that "Already one must conclude that the concept of drug is a non-scientific concept, that it is instituted on the basis of moral or political evaluations." In his philosophical-linguistic analysis, Derrida unmasks the socio-cultural mystifications made on the discourses on drugs.

Derrida also discusses drugs use by athletes. Exploring its confines, he says: "and what about women athletes who get pregnant for the stimulating, hormonal effects and then have an abortion after their event?"

Derrida discusses how the link between the rhetoric of drugs and the Western ideology. He also says that "Adorno and Horkheimer correctly point out that drug culture has always been associated with the West's other, with Oriental ethics and religion", and adds: "The Enlightenment [...] is in itself a declaration of war on drugs."

== Editions ==
This interview was made in 1989 and published more than one time as a journal article. It was included in the Derrida's 1992 book Points de suspension. Entretiens, as section XIV. The English edition of Points de suspension. Entretiens, titled Points...: Interviews 1974–1994 (1995), contained the interview at pp. 228–254, as the final part of the chapter Autobiophotographies.

- "The Rhetoric of Drugs. an Interview" – journal article by Jacques Derrida; Differences, Vol. 5, 1993
- "The Rhetoric of Drugs", translated by Michael Israel; published in Points: Interviews 1974-1994 (1995)

== See also ==
- Prohibition (drugs)
- Recreational drug use
- Hard and soft drugs
- Arguments for and against drug prohibition
- Cognitive liberty
