= Adam (2027 film) =

- Directed by: Tomasz Matuszczak
- Starring: Bartłomiej Deklewa
- Production company: East Studio
- Distributed by: Monolith Films
- Release date: 2027
- Country: Poland
- Language: Polish

Adam is an upcoming Polish biographical film directed by Tomasz Matuszczak. It is based on the life of Adam Małysz. The film tells the story of a Polish ski jumper, about his career and about everyday life. It was produced by East Studio and distributed by Monolith Films. The film's shooting scenes were filmed from January 2026 in Warsaw, Szczyrk, Wisła, and in German Oberstdorf.

== Plot ==
The action of the film "Adam" takes place before ski jumping became a national winter sport, and before the name Małysz was known throughout Poland. It is a story about a young athlete from Wisła who faces pressure, doubt, and responsibility – not only on the ski jump, but also in his private life.

Ski jumping is not just what you see on television broadcasts. It is also pressure, challenges, moments of loneliness, and times when everything depends on a single decision. This film touches precisely on that invisible side. This is my story. The script is close to me, and I feel that it portrays it honestly.

— Adam Małysz,

== Cast ==
- Bartłomiej Deklewa – Adam Małysz
- Maja Szopa – wife, Izabela Małysz
- Paweł Koślik – ski jumping coach, Apoloniusz Tajner
- Tomasz Kot – manager, Edi Federer
- Ireneusz Czop
- Piotr Głowacki
- Dorota Pomykała
- Andrzej Kłak

This is a story about growing up and about a flesh-and-blood man who can get lost but does not stop moving forward. I want the film to be sincere, close to everyday life and the realities of Poland at the end of the 1990s..

— film director Tomasz Matuszczak,

- Leonard Koterski
