= Area Defense Anti-Munitions =

Experimental laser weaponry

Area Defense Anti-Munitions (ADAM) is an experimental short range ground-to-air anti-missile weapons system being developed by Lockheed Martin. It uses a 10 kW fiber laser to attack its targets.
