= SS Ben Jee =

History
- Name: Ben Jee formerly Jolly Basil
- Namesake: Manx Gaelic term for Goddess
- Owner: Ramsey Steamship Company, Isle of Man
- Operator: Ramsey Steamship Company, Isle of Man
- Port of registry: Ramsey, Isle of Man
- Route: Ramsey – Garston / Whitehaven / Belfast
- Ordered: (circa) 1919
- Builder: Built Rotterdam
- Completed: June 1919
- Acquired: March 1924
- Fate: Sold 1933, scrapped 1959

General characteristics Ben Jee
- Type: Coastal Cargo Vessel
- Tonnage: 340 gross register tons (GRT)
- Length: 119 ft (36.3 m)
- Beam: 22 ft (6.7 m)
- Propulsion: Marine compound reciprocating engine.
- Speed: Approximately 9.5 knots (17.6 km/h; 10.9 mph)

SS Ben Jee was a steel-built coastal cargo vessel which was operated out of Ramsey, Isle of Man for the Ramsey Steamship Company; ostensibly to Garston, Belfast and Whitehaven. Her name, Ben Jee, came from the Manx Gaelic term for Goddess. Ben Jee was constructed in Rotterdam (circa) 1920. Originally named the Jolly Basil she was registered in London until acquired by the Ramsey Steam Ship Company in the Spring of 1924.

== Service life ==
Ben Jee entered service with the Ramsey Steam Ship Company under her original name in November 1924 under the command of Captain John Corlett. Capt. Corlett's previous command had been that of the Ben Blanche. Ben Jee was considered a well suited vessel for the company's operation, said to be well appointed throughout. She possessed two large hatchways which enabled an efficient loading and unloading operation.

== Incidents ==
On Tuesday 14 April 1925, a crew member of the Ben Jee drowned in Youghal Harbour, County Cork. William Quirk was the Second Engineer on the vessel, and was going ashore in a small rowing boat with a fellow crew member, Harold Dawson, in order to post some letters. Quirk fell over the side and although Dawson tried to save him, he sank quickly. The body of William Quirk was recovered and returned to the Isle of Man.

== Disposal ==
The Ben Jee was sold in 1933. She saw further service as a molasses tanker with a number of companies under the names Athelrill and Molarill before being scrapped in 1959 at Georgetown, Guyana. In 1946 the Ramsey Steam Ship Company acquired another vessel which they subsequently named Ben Jee.
