= ADAM Program =

Computer alert system

The ADAM Automated Delivery of Alerts on Missing Children Program, commonly known as the ADAM Program, is an alert system that is used to help recover missing children throughout the United States. In 1981 Adam Walsh, son of John and Revé Walsh, went missing. His parents set up the National Center for Missing & Exploited Children (NCMEC) in 1984 and later partnered with LexisNexis Risk Solutions who developed and donated the alert system program to NCMEC, which was named in honour of Adam Walsh. The program has been operating since 2000.

The ADAM Program uses technology to distribute a poster with a photo and information about a missing child to targeted recipients ⸺ including members of law enforcement, news media, schools, businesses, medical centers and individuals within a specific geographic search area.

== Program ==
NCMEC determines whether to send a poster including a photo and information about the missing child through the ADAM Program. This process includes uploading the poster and selecting geographic area(s) that have been identified by law enforcement as the search target. ADAM then distributes the poster by fax or email to law enforcement agencies, businesses and individuals who are located in the designated search area and have signed up to receive "ADAM alerts".

In one instance, posters featuring a 16-year-old child who had gone missing were distributed through the ADAM Program. The very next day, NCMEC's 24-hour hotline (1-800-843-5678) received a call from a poster recipient who had seen the missing child at their place of business. Local law enforcement was notified and the child was safely recovered. Another recovery of two children ⸺ a 2- and 4- year old ⸺ occurred after it was reported that the children were eight states away from where they were last seen. A poster was sent out from a radius of the suspected city and NCMEC immediately received two leads from businesses where the children had been seen. The abductor also saw the poster and turned themselves into the police later that evening and the children were safely recovered.

Team ADAM collaborated with FBI to provide technical expertise or monetary assistance to families affected from child abduction when necessary.

== ADAM Alerts ==
In 2017, the ADAM Program was opened to allow individuals to sign up to receive missing child alerts at their personal email account.

== See also ==
- National Center for Missing & Exploited Children
- National Missing Children's Day
- John Walsh
