= Adam (composer) =

Adam was a French composer who flourished in the 15th century of whom little is known for certainty. He is best known for his three rondeaux: Tout a caup, Au temps vendra, and Au grief hermitage; copies of which are held in Bodleian Library.

Modern scholarship has speculated that he may have been one of several different people. The first would be Adam Fabri who was made clerc de matines at the Notre-Dame de Paris in 1415. The second possibility is Adam Meigret who was in service as a first chaplain to Charles VI of France at the time of the monarch's death in 1422. The third possibility is Erasmus Adam who is mentioned in the rondeaux grieving the death of Albert II of Germany (died 1439). Other possibilities include Adam Hustini de Ora from Cambrai who was engaged at the Habsburg chapel in 1442–1443, and Adamo Grand who worked at the Savoy Chapel from 1433 to 1438 as master of the choirboys. Grove Music Online asserts that Adamo Grand is the most likely candidate of these men.
