= Saint Adam =

Saint Adam may refer to:

- Adam, the first man according to the Bible, venerated as a saint in certain Christian traditions
- Adam (died 4th century), one of the holy fathers slain at Sinai and Raithu
- Adamo Abate (c. 990 – c. 1065), medieval Italian abbot
