= Adam, Russia =

Adam (Russian: Адам) is the name of three rural localities in the Udmurt Republic, Russia:

- Adam, Karsovaysky Selsoviet, Balezinsky District, Udmurt Republic, a village in Karsovaysky Selsoviet of Balezinsky District
- Adam, Voyegurtsky Selsoviet, Balezinsky District, Udmurt Republic, a village in Voyegurtsky Selsoviet of Balezinsky District
- Adam, Glazovsky District, Udmurt Republic, a village in Adamsky Selsoviet of Glazovsky District
