= Adam (musical) =

- A Musical
- Music: Richard Ahlert
- Lyrics: Richard Ahlert
- Book: June Tansey
- Basis: Life of Adam Clayton Powell Jr.
- Productions: 1983 New York City

Adam is a musical with a book by June Tansey, lyrics and music by Richard Ahlert, based on the life of the controversial politician Adam Clayton Powell Jr.

== Synopsis ==
The story follows the life of Adam Clayton Powell Jr. and his wife (in real life the writers combined his first two wives Isabel Washington and Hazel Scott).

== Original production ==
The show premiered in New York City at Harry DeJur Henry Street Settlement Playhouse. The show was directed by Don Evans, costume design Judy Dearing, set design Llewellyn Harrison, light design Shirley Prendergast, choral and dance arrangements Annie Joe Edwards, sound design Michael Melziner, production stage manager C. Harrison Avery Jr., orchestration and solo arrangements Neal Tate, choreography and musical staging Dianne McIntyre.

The original cast starred Jeff Bates (Charley, Reporter and Maitre D'), Frederick Beals (Congressman Mudd), Bill Boss (Congressman Gilo and Television Voice), Richard Chiffy (Reporter), Dawn Davis (Sally, Louise and Southern Belle), Randy Flood (Doug Marshall), Reuben Greene (Adam Clayton Powell Jr.), Suzanne Hall (New York Socialite), Hugh Harrell (Adam Clayton Powell, Sr.), Jackee Harry (Rachel Watts), Rosetta Jefferson (Serena Crawford), Jim Keels (Congressman Shanklin), S. Epatha Merkerson (Addie Carmicheal), Kevin Ramsey (M.C., Bellboy and Young Jim), Deborah Smith (Annie and Barmaid), Raymond Stough (Sam Bradbury), Robin Wilson (Madame Rochais and Miss Lee), and Kevin Wynn (Photographer, Young Brad and Old Joe).
