= Arrestee Drug Abuse Monitoring =

Survey conducted by the United States Department of Justice

Arrestee Drug Abuse Monitoring (ADAM) was a survey conducted by the United States Department of Justice from 1997-2003 and the Office of National Drug Control Policy as ADAM II from 2007-2014 to gauge the prevalence of illegal drug use among arrestees and to track changes in patterns of drug use an availability across regions of the country. It was a reformulation of the prior Drug Use Forecasting (DUF) program, which focused on five drugs in particular: cocaine, marijuana, methamphetamine, opiates, and Phencyclidine|PCP. AS ADAM it included tests for 9 drugs and self report of a long list of others.

== Method ==
Participants were randomly selected from arrest records in jails and booking facilities in major metropolitan areas; no personally identifying information is taken from each record chosen, and prevalence estimates can be generated regarding those arrested in the catchment area covered by the jail.

ADAM began as the Drug Use Forecasting program in 1987, which tested arrestees in 13 (later 23) jurisdictions on a quarterly basis. In 1991, juvenile data was added for the first time, at select sites. In 1996, President Clinton requested that the program be expanded, as ADAM, and the program was redesigned in 1997 by Abt Associates. At most, 40 jurisdictions ever participated in the program at one time under the DOJ and 10 counties under ONDCP's ADAM II.

Information was obtained from personal interviews and urine analysis obtained voluntarily and confidentially, on the day of arrest and within 48 hours of arrest to allow a reasonable match or window of detection related to the half life of each drug in urine samples.

Under DUF, both male and female subjects were selected on a random basis. When ADAM was fully implemented in 2000, the redesigned methodology was adopted, whereby male subjects were chosen at random and female subjects were chosen where available (not all participating sites have sufficient numbers of women arrestees to be statistically sound. ADAM defined this as 25 women available to be interviewed). In addition, the interview portion of the ADAM program was expanded to cover behaviors and drug use that could not be tested for by urinalysis, such as alcohol abuse, participation in the retail drug market, prior arrests and treatment experiences. The catchment areas were redefined, from metropolitan area/city limits to counties to help standardize the data.

== Cancellation ==
On January 29, 2004, the ADAM program was halted due to funding concerns. The program was reimplemented in 2007 funded by ONDCP and run by Abt Associates. ONDCP continued the program in 10 of the original sites until 2014.

== Testing areas ==
These sites were used at some or all points of the DUF/ADAM studies as testing areas. Some of the smaller locations such as Woodbury County, Iowa and Rio Arriba, New Mexico were added late in the program's life, in an attempt to gain information about non-metropolitan areas. In 2007 ten of the original sites continued: NYC, Chicago, Washington DC, Denver, Charlotte, Indianapolis, Sacramento, Portland, Minneapolis, Atlanta. In the last two years of operation, the program continued in five of these sites: Denver, Sacramento, NYC, Atlanta, Chicago.

- Albany, NY
- Albuquerque, NM
- Anchorage, AK
- Atlanta, GA
- Birmingham, AL
- Boston, MA
- Charlotte, NC
- Chicago, IL
- Cleveland, OH
- Dallas, TX
- Denver, CO
- Des Moines, IA
- Detroit, MI
- Ft. Lauderdale, FL
- Honolulu, HI
- Houston, TX
- Indianapolis, IN
- Laredo, TX
- Los Angeles, CA
- Las Vegas, NV
- Miami, FL
- Minneapolis, MN
- New Orleans, LA
- Manhattan, NY (New York City)
- Oklahoma City, OK
- Omaha, NE
- Philadelphia, PA
- Phoenix, AZ
- Portland, OR
- Rio Arriba County, NM
- Sacramento, CA
- Salt Lake City, UT
- San Antonio, TX
- San Diego, CA
- San Jose, CA
- Seattle, WA
- Spokane, WA
- St. Louis, MO
- Tampa, FL
- Tucson, AZ
- Tulsa, OK
- Washington, D.C.
- Woodbury County, IA
