= Drug Abuse Warning Network =

Public health surveillance system

The Drug Abuse Warning Network (DAWN) was a public health surveillance system in the United States that monitored drug-related visits to hospital emergency departments and drug-related deaths. DAWN was discontinued in 2011, but its creator, the Substance Abuse and Mental Health Services Administration (SAMHSA), continues to develop other sources of data on drug-related emergency visits.

== Organization ==
Hospitals participating in DAWN are non-federal, short-stay general hospitals that feature a 24-hour emergency department. Patients are never interviewed. All data are collected through a retrospective review of patient medical records and decedent case files. DAWN collects detailed drug data, including illegal drugs of abuse, prescription and over-the-counter medications, dietary supplements, and non-pharmaceutical inhalants. Because the DAWN cases are defined broadly, DAWN captures many different types of drug-related cases. The whole point of this organization is to find out how many people abuse most drugs. They also seek short-stay hospitals, when a case is drug-related.

== History ==
In 1974, DAWN was designed and developed by the scientific staff of the DEA's Office of Science and Technology. It was jointly funded with the National Institute of Drug Abuse (NIDA). DAWN then became a division of the United States Department of Justice before becoming part of NIDA in 1980. On October 1, 1992, DAWN became part the Substance Abuse and Mental Health Services Administration (SAMHSA), an agency of the United States Department of Health and Human Services. SAMHSA has contracted with Westat, a private research corporation, to manage the New DAWN on the agency's behalf.

== Controversy ==
Information collected by DAWN is widely cited by drug policy officials, who have sometimes confused drug-related episodes – emergency department visits induced by drugs – with drug mentions. The Wisconsin Department of Justice claimed, "In Wisconsin, marijuana overdose visits in emergency rooms equal to heroin or morphine, twice as common as Valium." Common Sense for Drug Policy called this as a distortion, noting, "The federal DAWN report itself notes that reports of marijuana do not mean people are going to the hospital for a marijuana overdose, it only means that people going to the hospital mention marijuana as a drug they use". This criticism is also not correct. DAWN has recently clarified their use of the term "drug mention" in methodology because of this erroneous claim. The data is collected by a systematic and confidential review of patients' medical records. Thus, for example, a patient who broke an arm while high on marijuana would not be included in the data. A report released by DAWN in 2002 claims that marijuana overdose alone resulted in documented deaths in Atlanta and Boston, respectively. However, there is no known record or evidence to support the existence of a case of human fatality by result of marijuana overdose.
