= For a New Critique of Political Economy =

Book by Bernard Stiegler

- Author: Bernard Stiegler
- Translator: Daniel Ross
- Language: French
- Genre: Politics
- ISBN: 978-0745648033

For a New Critique of Political Economy (French: Pour une nouvelle critique de l'économie politique) (ISBN 0745648045) is a book by French philosopher Bernard Stiegler. It was published in 2010 by Polity Press and is translated by Daniel Ross.

The book is composed of two separate but related parts: "For a New Critique of Political Economy," and "Pharmacology of Capital and Economy of Contribution." The first section was published as a short book in France, Pour une nouvelle critique de l'économie politique (2009) ISBN 2718607971, whereas the second section is part of a larger work published in France under the title, Ce qui fait que la vie vaut la peine d'être vécue (2010) ISBN 2081220350.

Both sections constitute a response to the 2008 financial crisis, and introduce Stiegler's ideas about the relation of technology and economy, as well as calling for a new consideration of the questions emerging from the crisis.

Key figures discussed in the book are Plato and Karl Marx.
