= Echographies of Television =

Book by Jacques Derrida and Bernard Stiegler (1996)

- Author: Jacques Derrida; Bernard Stiegler
- Original title: Échographies de la télévision. Entretiens filmés
- Translator: Jennifer Bajorek
- Language: French
- Genre: Non-fiction
- Publisher: Éditions Galilée
- Publication date: 1996
- Publication place: France
- English publication date: 2002

Echographies of Television: Filmed Interviews (French: Échographies de la télévision. Entretiens filmés) is a book by the French philosophers Jacques Derrida and Bernard Stiegler. It was originally published in France in 1996, by Éditions Galilée. The English translation by Jennifer Bajorek was published by Polity Press in 2002.

Echographies of Television discusses a number of subjects, but the overall theme concerns the impact of technological acceleration, and in particular the social, political and philosophical significance of the development of digital media.

== Contents ==
The book consists of three parts.

- Artifactualities. This section is by Derrida, and consists of excerpts from an interview with Derrida published in the French journal Passages in 1993.
- Echographies of Television. This section forms the bulk of the volume and consists of Stiegler conducting an extended interview with Derrida. The interview was filmed by Jean-Christophe Rosé under the auspices of the Institut National de l'Audiovisuel, on December 22, 1993. The interview was originally intended for broadcast on television, but this never took place.
- The Discrete Image. The third section consists of an article by Stiegler, which was first published in Art/Photographie numérique. L'image réinventée (Aix-en-Provence: Cyprès, 1995).

== Artifactualities ==
In "Artifactualities," Derrida begins by stating that "to think one's time" means, more than ever, thinking how this "time" is artificially produced, an artifact. He argues that "actuality" is always a matter of "artifactuality," involving selection, editing, performativity, and thus amounting to a "fictional fashioning". Derrida therefore argues that we must develop a "critical culture" concerning this production of actuality, but he immediately appends three cautions to this statement:

- the need to recall that despite the "internationalisation" of communication, ethnocentrism still predominates in the form of the "national"
- advances in the domain of "live" broadcast and recording give the illusion of an actuality which is not produced
- the artifactuality of actuality must not be used as an alibi, by concluding that therefore nothing ever happens and there is nothing but simulacrum and delusion.

What is least acceptable in the media today, he argues, is to take one's time, or to waste time, and hence what is perhaps most required is to effect a change in the rhythm of the media.

Derrida then asks what it means to be concerned with the present, or to do so as a philosopher. It may be a matter, he notes, of in fact being untimely, of not confusing the present with actuality. One must, on the one hand, take one's time, hold back, defer, while, on the other hand, one must rush into things headlong, urgently—one must be both hyperactual and anachronistic. Derrida has never thought there to be an opposition between urgency and différance. If différance involves a relation to alterity which is a form of deferral, it is nevertheless also, and for this reason, a relation to "what comes," to the unexpected, to the event as such, and therefore to the urgent. We cannot oppose the event, which is the very possibility of a future—we only oppose those particular events which bring things which are not good. The performativity of the event exceeds all anticipation or programming, and hence contains an irreducible element of messianism, linking it to justice (here distinguished from law), as well as to revolution.

Between the most general logics and the most unpredictable singularities comes "rhythm". If, for example, we could know in advance that the Communist regimes of Eastern Europe were doomed to failure, the pace and rhythm at which this occurred could only be understood retrospectively, taking into account causalities which had been previously overlooked, such as the way in which the fall of the Berlin Wall was immediately inscribed in a global telecommunications network.

Politics must retain a sense of the unanticipated, of the arrival of the absolutely unexpected, the absolute arrivant. A politics which loses all reference to a principle of unconditional hospitality is a politics, Derrida argues, that loses its reference to justice. This may mean, for example, that it is necessary to distinguish a politics of immigration from a politics of the right to asylum, because the former presumes the equivalence of the political and the national (immigration policy is a matter for the nation-state), while the latter does not (since, for example, motives for immigration, such as unemployment, may fail to conform to immigration requirements, but nevertheless are a kind of dysfunction of the nation, if not indeed the indirect result on poor countries of decisions made by wealthy countries). On this basis, Derrida provides a critique of the way in which borders are conceived by Jean-Marie Le Pen and the French National Front.

It remains necessary, Derrida argues, to take up the battle fought by Enlightenment philosophy against the "return of the worst". As a struggle against return, it is a matter of a "law of the spectral," of spectres, ghosts, and phantoms. It is a matter of understanding that what comes back is on the one hand what must be fought against, and on the other hand irreducible, originary, and necessary. Thus when we are striving to remember the worst (for example, the complicity of the French state for the treatment of Jews during World War II), we are striving to recall the victims, but this means also to call them back, not just for the sake of a present, but for an ongoing struggle, and thus for a future.

All this is a question of spirit and of inheritance. There is more than one spirit, and thus when we speak of spirit, we choose one spirit over another, affirm one injunction or interpretation over another, and thus take up a responsibility. To inherit is to reaffirm an injunction, but to take it up as an assignation to be deciphered. In so doing, we are what we inherit. We must decide, and we can only decide, on the basis of what we inherit, but these decisions are also the transformation of what we inherit, and therefore always also involve invention.

Derrida concludes by stating that he does not believe in the return of Communism in the form of the party, yet he does believe in the return of critiques which are Marxist in inspiration and spirit. This new International without party, which does not accept the imposition of a new world order, must be more, Derrida argues, than a matter of being able to take the time to read Marx slowly and carefully, now that "Marx is dead". In this sense, it is a question of more than simply the elaboration of critiques.

== Echographies of Television ==
In "Echographies of Television," Stiegler begins by noting that Derrida, in agreeing to record their interview, asked for a "right of inspection". He asks Derrida why he did so, and what this would mean in the era of television and "teletechnologies". Derrida responds that if he did so, he did not imagine such a right would be effective, and that it is difficult for intellectuals to adapt to the conditions of television, even if they must also not cut themselves off from a public sphere dominated by that medium. It may be a matter not of fighting today against teletechnologies but rather so that they are able to make more room for different norms, those of intellectuals, artists, scientists, etc. Today the "right to inspection" belongs, more than to anyone else, to those who show, edit, store, interpret and exploit images.

Stiegler points out that we learn from reading Derrida himself that writing is already a kind of teletechnology, and he therefore asks Derrida about the specificity of these more contemporary teletechnologies, especially television. Rather than immediately answering the question directly, Derrida first states that the answer cannot be a matter of opposing contemporary prostheses to some prior epoch of immediate or natural speech. If there is a specificity of modern teletechnology, then it has something to do with the directness of "live" recording and transmission, and the speed with which what is recorded can be made to travel the farthest distances. Nevertheless, however, we must also recognise that even the most "live" broadcasts are produced.

Stiegler asks Derrida about his term, "artifactuality," which indicates that the construction of "actuality" passes through the artifact or the artificial, that it involves a selection. Stiegler suggests that what is important about this is not so much that reality is "artificially" constructed on the basis of a selection, but rather what matters are the criteria of selection. He therefore asks Derrida if the problem today is that the selection criteria are overdetermined by the "commercial character of industry," and thus if when Derrida speaks of a "politics of memory," he is talking about regulating the effects of market pressure on the construction of actuality. Derrida responds by indicating that the concept of the market is complicated: the market cannot be opposed to state practice, insofar as, for example, public television channels, as soon as they are in competition with private channels, must themselves "conquer the market," becoming concerned with ratings, etc. To address Stiegler's question would mean, Derrida says, knowing what one means by the market in a world in which there is an increasingly "globalised" circulation of televisual commodities.

== The Discrete Image ==
"The Discrete Image" is an essay by Stiegler about the significance of the invention of digital photography and digital cinema. He begins by stating that "the image in general" does not exist. The mental image (the image I see in my mind) cannot be separated from the image-object (a painting, photograph, etc.), and the latter is always inscribed in a technical history. Just as Derrida showed that there is no transcendental signified (no meaning) which can be shown to precede its inscription in a signifier, so too there is no "transcendental imagery" which precedes the image-object. If the mental image and the image-object cannot be opposed, however, they are nevertheless different, first of all because the image-object lasts while the mental image is ephemeral. But if there has never been an image-object without a mental image, even so, there has never been a mental image which is not, in some way, the return of an image-object.

Stiegler identifies three stages in the recent history of the image object:

- in the 19th century, the invention of the analog image, that is, photography
- in the 20th century, the digital image, that is, computer-generated imagery
- at the end of the 20th century, the analogico-digital image, that is, digital photography.

This third stage is part of a "systematic discretization of movement," a process of "grammatisation of the visible". (Note: Most translations of Stiegler prefer "grammatisation" rather than translator Jennifer Bajorek's choice, "grammaticalisation". Stiegler describes grammatisation as follows: "What I call grammatisation is the process by which all the fluxes through which symbolic (that is, also, existential) acts are linked, can be discretised, formalised, and reproduced." Stiegler, Mécréance et discrédit 1. La décadence des démocraties industrielles (Paris: Galilée, 2004), pp. 65–6, n. 1. For evidence indicating why "grammatisation" is a preferable translation, see Stiegler, De la misère symbolique 1. L'époque hyperindustrielle (Paris: Galilée, 2004), p. 113.)

Great moments of technical innovation "suspend" a situation which previously appeared stable, and impose a new situation. Analogico-digital technology is one such moment, in which what is undergoing an intense evolution are the conditions by which we perceive and, therefore, the conditions by which we believe. This is because the digital photograph suspends a certain spontaneous belief which the analog photograph bore within itself: it calls into question what Roland Barthes called the "this was" of the photograph, its intentionality (in a phenomenological sense). Although it is possible to manipulate the analog photo, this is as it were an "accidental" possibility, whereas manipulation is the essence of the digital photo.

Nevertheless, the "accidental" possibility of manipulating the analog image is something which had already been increasingly undertaken by the mass media in recent years. The ability to do so derives from the fact that even the analog photo is a technical synthesis, and as such exposed to an irreducible potential for falsification. For this falsification to be effective, there must be an alteration of what was, but there must also be a belief on the part of the viewer in the "this was" of the photo. Today, however, with the analogico-digital photo, the conditions of this belief are diminished, leading to a general doubt, and one which affects, for example, democracy. This doubt must be doubled by another doubt, a positive, resolute doubt leading to new forms of "objective analysis" and "subjective synthesis," and therefore to a new kind of belief and of disbelief. The doubt and fear caused by the analogico-digital image is therefore also what would make possible this more knowing belief.

The destabilisation of knowledge caused by digitalisation may induce fear, but analog photography also caused people to be afraid: "in the first photographs, we saw phantoms". Analog photography is the result of a "contiguity of luminances," that is, light reflecting from an object strikes photosensitive film, which is then developed with the use of light, producing a photograph which I see when light reflects from the photograph onto my retina. There is a definite chain of light events, connecting the moment the camera records an image and the moment the developed photograph is seen. This is, in a way, a matter of the past touching me in the present, of something coming to touch me from out of the night of the past. With the digital photo, this chain is broken, or decomposed: there is a treatment involved in the production of the digital image, reducing the image to binary code to be manipulated and adjusted, which does not require this contiguity of luminances.

Digitalisation is a form of "discretisation": whereas the analog photo relies on the continuity of the chain of luminances, and the continuity of the way in which the spectrum is recorded, these two aspects become, in the digital photo, discontinuous. Reducing the image to binary code means breaking the spectrum down into discontinuous elements which can be treated in any way whatsoever. Yet the analogico-digital photo does retain something of the chain of light events which characterised the analog photo: insofar as it remains a photo. At the same time, however, there is no way for the viewer to know what aspects of the photo are actual records of a photographic event, and which parts have been altered, added, or subtracted, in a way completely disconnected from the photographic process.

Extending the analysis conducted by Walter Benjamin, Stiegler delineates three kinds of reproducibility which constitute three great epochs of memory:

- the reproducibility of the letter (first handwritten, then printed)
- the analog photographic and cinematographic reproducibility studied by Benjamin
- digital reproducibility.

The difference between the analog and the digital has traditionally been understood in terms of an opposition between the continuous and the discontinuous. The fact that the image has been understood as continuous in this sense is why it has been thought to resist semiological interpretation, which depends on the discreteness of the sign. But with the advent of the analogico-digital image, combining two kinds of reproducibility, it becomes clear that the image was always in a way discrete.

The production and realisation of images by an artist or filmmaker is a form of analysis, which treats images as discrete elements to be edited and assembled. The work of the spectator who puts this together in imagination as a "continuous" whole is a form of synthesis. That we experience the progression of images in film as a continuous movement is less the result of retinal persistence than it is of the spectator's expectations, which work to efface the editing. These expectations are always a question of the return of phantoms from the past: animation is always reanimation. Thus if the image is always discrete, it is so, as it were, discreetly, without drawing attention. But with digital technology it becomes possible not only to produce cinematic or televisual works in a new way, but to analyse and therefore interpret these in a new way—for example, to index images, camera movements, voices, etc.

In other words, digitisation "opens the possibility of new knowledges of the image". Discretising the continuous makes it possible to decompose the this was, and thus the spectator may come to have not only a synthetic but an analytic relation to the image. That this is possible is because the synthesis we make in our minds when we view an image happens according to conditions related to the technical synthesis effected by the recording apparatus. To view an image is to engage with that technical synthesis, and implies a kind of knowledge of the apparatus by the spectator that determines the conditions of the experience of spectatorship. So a change in the technical conditions of reproducibility will mean a mutation in the way in which a spectator synthesises an image. To each of the epochs of reproducibility corresponds three different kinds of belief. The fact that digitalisation makes very possible the representation of things which were never in front of a lens changes the conditions of belief, specifically the belief that photography is a matter of the return of the past in the present. As such, analogico-digital photography possesses a different spirit than previous photographic technology, because what the spectator knows about the image is that it has an uncertain relation to "reality": there is an irreducible non-knowledge inscribed in the spectator's knowledge.

Changes to the analytic capacities of the spectator inevitably produce changes in the way the spectator "intentionalises" imagery, that is, changes in spectatorial synthesis. This is similar to the way in which the alphabetisation of writing produced changes in the synthesis of language. It is the history and evolution of writing that made possible the critical and logical spirit which we attribute to language, and which we have until now not attributed to the apprehension of the image. Grammar claims to locate the rules of language, but as every language is always undergoing a process of becoming, and is never anything other than the sum of the "use" of that language by speakers, these grammatical rules can never be a matter of a "competence" which precedes those rules brought forth and invented in the course of linguistic performance. What this means for the analogico-digital image is that, as increasing analytical possibilities emerge from the technologies of the image, the descriptions and rules which emerge from these possibilities will at the same time mean the transformation of what is being described. The question is to know how to take advantage of these opportunities for transformation which will emerge from technological advances.

In other words, "the evolution of the technical synthesis implies the evolution of the spectatorial synthesis". As Derrida showed in relation to the sign, language is always already writing, a system of traces, composed of discrete elements. Stiegler proposes a similar hypothesis in relation to the image: "life (anima – on the side of the mental image) is always already cinema (animation – image-object)". Thus the evolution of both forms of synthesis, technical and spectatorial, occurs as one composed process, in what Gilbert Simondon calls a "transductive relation". The massive changes which will follow from digitisation are a chance to develop a "culture of reception". This is in contrast to the way in which Hollywood has taken up these changes: by opposing production and consumption, keeping analysis in the hands of the producers, and synthesis a matter for consumers. Changing this relation means creating a situation more like that of literature: one cannot read a work of literature without, in a sense, knowing how to write. A world in which the spectator will see the image analytically will also be a world in which "television" and "text" are no longer opposed.
