= Différance =

Concept in literary theory

Différance is a French term coined by Jacques Derrida. Roughly speaking, the method of différance is a way to analyze how signs (words, symbols, metaphors, etc) come to have meanings. It suggests that meaning is not inherent in a sign but arises from its relationships with other signs, a continual process of contrasting with what comes before and later. That is, a sign acquires meaning by being different from other signs. The meaning of a sign changes over time, as new signs keep appearing and old signs keep disappearing. It is central to Derrida's concept of deconstruction, a critical outlook concerned with the relationship between text and meaning.

However, the meaning of a sign is not just determined by the system of signs present currently. Past meanings leave "traces", and possible future meanings "haunt". The meaning of a sign is determined by the interaction between past traces, future haunts, and the system of signs in the present.

== Overview ==
Derrida first uses the term différance in his 1963 paper "Cogito et histoire de la folie". The term différance then played a key role in Derrida's engagement with the philosophy of Edmund Husserl in Speech and Phenomena. It was further elaborated in various other works, notably in his essay "Différance" and in the interviews collected in Positions.

The ⟨a⟩ of différance is a deliberate misspelling of différence, though the two are pronounced identically, IPA: [difeʁɑ̃s] (différance plays on the fact that the French verb différer means both "to defer" and "to differ"). This misspelling highlights the fact that its written form is not heard, and serves to further subvert the traditional privileging of speech over writing (see arche-writing and logocentrism), as well as the distinction between the sensible and the intelligible. The difference articulated by the ⟨a⟩ in différance is not apparent to the senses via sound, "but neither can it belong to intelligibility, to the ideality which is not fortuitously associated with the objectivity of theorein or understanding." This is because the language of understanding is already caught up in sensory metaphors—for example, θεωρεῖν (theōrein) means "to see" in Ancient Greek.

In the essay "Différance" Derrida indicates that différance gestures at a number of heterogeneous features that govern the production of textual meaning. Words and signs are not identical with what they signify, and only acquire meaning through their differences from other words and signs; meaning arises from the differentiation of words from one another, and the consequential engendering of binary oppositions and hierarchies. Thus, meaning is forever "deferred" or postponed through an endless chain of signifiers. Derrida refers to this process as espacement or "spacing" and temporisation or "temporising".

Derrida developed the concept of différance deeper in the course of an argument against the phenomenology of Husserl, who sought a rigorous analysis of the role of memory and perception in our understanding of sequential items such as music or language. Derrida's approach argues that because the perceiver's mental state is constantly in flux and differs from one re-reading to the next, a general theory describing this phenomenon is unachievable.

A term related to the idea of différance in Derrida's thought is the supplement, "itself bound up in a supplementary play of meaning which defies semantic reduction."

== Between structure and genesis ==
Derrida approaches texts as constructed around oppositions which all speech has to articulate if it intends to make any sense whatsoever. This is so because identity is viewed in non-essentialist terms as a construct, and because constructs only produce meaning through the interplay of differences inside a "system of distinct signs". This approach to text, in a broad sense, emerges from semiology advanced by Ferdinand de Saussure.

Derrida's position might broadly be stated as being that language is fluid rather than ideally static. His notorious comment that "il n'y a pas de hors-texte" ("there is no outside-the-text", sometimes incorrectly translated as "there is nothing outside the text") has given rise to the allegation that he believes that nothing exists but words. Derrida is concerned to distinguish his procedure from Hegel's, because Hegelianism's notion of binary oppositions whose continual supersession (relève) by new higher-level binary oppositions rests on a system of elemental differences, whereas in language there are no fundamental self-sufficient units of meaning.

Saussure, considered one of the fathers of structuralism, explained that terms get their meaning in reciprocal determination with other terms inside language:

In language there are only differences. Even more important: a difference generally implies positive terms between which the difference is set up; but in language there are only differences without positive terms. Whether we take the signified or the signifier, language has neither ideas nor sounds that existed before the linguistic system, but only conceptual and phonic differences that have issued from the system. The idea or phonic substance that a sign contains is of less importance than the other signs that surround it. ... A linguistic system is a series of differences of sound combined with a series of differences of ideas; but the pairing of a certain number of acoustical signs with as many cuts made from the mass of thought engenders a system of values.

Saussure explicitly suggests that linguistics is a branch of a more general semiology, of a science of signs in general, human codes being only one among others. Nevertheless, in the end, as Derrida points out, he makes of linguistics "the regulatory model", and "for essential, and essentially metaphysical, reasons had to privilege speech, and everything that links the sign to phoné": Derrida prefers to follow the more "fruitful paths (formalization)" of a general semiotics without falling into what he considers to be "a hierarchizing teleology" privileging linguistics, and to speak of 'mark' rather than of language, not as something restricted to mankind, but as prelinguistic, as the pure possibility of language, working everywhere there is a relation to something else.

Derrida sees these differences as working in all languages, systems of distinct signs, and codes, where terms do not have absolute meanings but instead draw meaning from reciprocal determination with other terms. Derrida will take this structural differentiation into account when articulating the meaning of différance, a mark he felt the need to create and will become a fundamental tool in his lifelong work: deconstruction:

Différance is the systematic play of differences, of the traces of differences, of the spacing by means of which elements are related to each other. This spacing is the simultaneously active and passive (the a of différance indicates this indecision as concerns activity and passivity, that which cannot be governed by or distributed between the terms of this opposition) production of the intervals without which the "full" terms would not signify, would not function.

But structural difference cannot be taken as absolutely basic; it must also be deconstructed, by destabilizing its static, synchronic, taxonomic, hierarchical, ahistoric elements, bearing in mind that all structure already refers to the generative movement in the play of differences.

Différance also involves deferring, the recognition that meaning is not only synchronous differentiation from other terms inside a structure of marks or traces, but also diachronous referral back to the origins and development of the mark or trace and its meanings - difference as structure and deferring as genesis:

the a of différance also recalls that spacing is temporization, the detour and postponement by means of which intuition, perception, consummation—in a word, the relationship to the present, the reference to a present reality, to a being—are always deferred. Deferred by virtue of the very principle of difference which holds that an element functions and signifies, takes on or conveys meaning, only by referring to another past or future element in an economy of traces. This economic aspect of différance, which brings into play a certain not conscious calculation in a field of forces, is inseparable from the more narrowly semiotic aspect of différance.

One consequence of this approach is that the subject is not present to itself, but is constituted in the spacing and temporising process of différance:

It confirms that the subject, and first of all the conscious and speaking subject, depends upon the system of differences and the movement of différance, that the subject is not present, nor above all present to itself before différance, that the subject is constituted only in being divided from itself, in becoming space, in temporizing, in deferral; and it confirms that, as Saussure said, "language [which consists only of differences] is not a function of the speaking subject."

Questioning the myth of the presence of meaning in itself ("objective") and/or for itself ("subjective"), Derrida's approach is to deconstruct texts in order to show where conceptual oppositions are put to work in the construction of meaning and values:

At the point at which the concept of différance, and the chain attached to it, intervenes, all the conceptual oppositions of metaphysics (signifier/signified; sensible/intelligible; writing/speech; passivity/activity; etc.)—to the extent that they ultimately refer to the presence of something present (for example, in the form of the identity of the subject who is present for all his operations, present beneath every accident or event, self-present in its "living speech," in its enunciations, in the present objects and acts of its language, etc.)—become non-pertinent. They all amount, at one moment or another, to a subordination of the movement of différance in favor of the presence of a value or a meaning supposedly antecedent to différance, more original than it, exceeding and governing it in the last analysis. This is still the presence of what we called above the "transcendental signified."

These relations with other terms express not only meaning but also values. Such oppositions are put to work in texts in both theoretical and practical ways. The first task of deconstruction is to reveal their operation in philosophical, literary, juridical etc. texts:

On the one hand, we must traverse a phase of overturning. To do justice to this necessity is to recognize that in a classical philosophical opposition we are not dealing with the peaceful coexistence of a vis-à-vis, but rather with a violent hierarchy. One of the two terms governs the other (axiologically, logically, etc.), or has the upper hand.

To deconstruct the opposition, first of all, is to overturn the hierarchy at a given moment. To overlook this phase of overturning is to forget the conflictual and subordinating structure of opposition.

It is not that the final task of deconstruction is to surpass all oppositions, for they are structurally necessary to produce sense; they cannot simply be suspended once and for all. But this does not obviate their need to be analyzed and criticized in all their manifestations, by showing the way logical and axiological oppositions are at work in all discourse in order for it to be able to produce meaning and values.

=== Illustration ===
For example, the word "house" derives its meaning more from the way it differs from "shed", "mansion", "hotel", "building", etc. than from the way it is tied to a certain image of a traditional house. The relationship between signifier and signified depends on each term being established in reciprocal determination with the other terms rather than on an ostensive description or definition.

When can we talk about a "house" or a "mansion" or a "shed"? The same can be said about verbs, in all the world languages: when should we stop saying "walk" and start saying "run"? The same happens, of course, with adjectives: when must we stop saying "yellow" and start saying "orange", or stop defining as "black" and start saying "white", or "rich" and "poor", "entrepreneur" and "worker", "civilized" and "primitive", "man" and "animal", "beast" and "sovereign", "christian" and "pagan", or "beautiful" and start saying "ugly", or "bad" and start saying "good", or "truth" and start saying "false", "determined" and "free"? Or "in" and "out", "here" and "there", "now" and "then", "past" and "present" and "future" and "eternal"? Not only are the topological differences between the words relevant here, but the differentials between what is signified is also covered by différance. Deferral also comes into play, as the words that occur following "house" or "white" in any expression will revise the meaning of that word, sometimes dramatically so. This is true not only with syntagmatic succession in relation with paradigmatic simultaneity, but also, in a broader sense, between diachronic succession in History related with synchronic simultaneity inside a "system of distinct signs".

Thus, complete meaning is always "differential" and postponed in language; there is never a moment when meaning is complete and total. A simple example would consist of looking up a given word in a dictionary, then proceeding to look up the words found in that word's definition, etc., also comparing with older dictionaries from different periods in time, and such a process would never end.

This is also true with all ontological oppositions and its many declensions, not only in philosophy as in human sciences in general, cultural studies, theory of Law, et cetera. For example: the intelligible and the sensible, the spontaneous and the receptive, autonomy and heteronomy, the empirical and the transcendental, immanent and transcendent, as the interior and exterior, or the founded and the founder, normal and abnormal, phonetic and writing, analysis and synthesis, the literal sense and figurative meaning in language, reason and madness in psychiatry, the masculine and feminine in gender theory, man and animal in ecology, the beast and the sovereign in the political field, theory and practice as distinct dominions of thought itself. In all discourses in fact (and by right) we can make clear how they were dramatized, how the cleavages were made during the centuries, each author giving it different centers and establishing different hierarchies between the terms in the opposition.

=== Paradox ===
It may seem paradoxical to suggest that différance, a word invented by Derrida, is not a concept (i.e. does not have a definition), but this is indicative of his broad general approach. Derrida introduces a number of new words and reinterprets others ("deconstruction" itself being the best-known example), but he vigorously resists attempts to pin them down to precise conceptual definitions. He does not seek simply to replace existing conceptual vocabularies with a new "deconstructive" one, whose terms would themselves silently embody precisely the same kinds of systems and structures of meaning, belief and value that he was questioning.

Derrida's focus is on the process by which language secretly embodies, replicates and enforces certain ways of thinking, certain beliefs and values - a process which on occasion he describes as "violence" - and his method, using the tools and techniques of his invented vocabulary, is to shake it up so that their silences and secrets are brought out into the open. (It is not irrelevant that for Heidegger the Ancient Greek word for "truth" - aletheia - means "unconcealing", i.e. bringing out of concealment into the light.) In later years, when "deconstruction" had come to be used as a kind of quasi-technical term in fields as diverse as literary criticism and cookery, Derrida regretted choosing that word rather than "de-sedimentation" as the name of his approach to critical thinking.

== The web of language ==
We reside, according to this philosophy, in a web of language, or at least one of interpretation, that has been laid down by tradition and which shifts each time we hear or read an utterance—even if it is the same utterance. Différance and deconstruction are attempts to understand this web of language, to search, in Derrida's words, for the "other of language". This "other of language" is close to what Anglophone Philosophy calls the Reference of a word. There is a deferment of meaning with each act of re-reading. There is a difference of readings with each re-reading. In Derrida's words, "there is nothing outside the [con]text" of a word's use and its place in the lexicon. Text, in Derrida's parlance, refers to context and includes all about the "real-life" situation of the speech/text (cf. speech act theory).

=== Temporal delay ===
For Derrida, the relationship between the signifier and the signified is not understood exactly as Saussure described it. For Derrida there is a deferral, a continual and indefinite postponement, which means that the signified can never be reached. The formation of the linguistic sign is not static, but is marked by movement in time. The easiest way to understand this is to imagine Saussure's model as a two-dimensional plane, where each signified is separated from others by the differences in its sound image. (If two sound-images are exactly alike, one would not be able to distinguish between them - cf. différence and différance.) Each signifier is then a particular point on that plane. Derrida, however, adds a third dimension - time - to account for the temporal act of forming the sign. This is not to say that there is no relationship between the two. However, Derrida felt that the old model focused too heavily on the signifier, rather than on utterance and occurrence. From the point of view of the temporal formation of the sign, the signifier and the signified are severed completely and irrevocably.

=== Example of word introduction ===
An example of this effect occurred in England during the Renaissance, when oranges began to be imported from the Mediterranean. Yellow and red came to be differentiated from a new colour term, "orange". What was the meaning of these words before 1600? – What is their meaning afterwards? Such effects often occur in language and frequently this effect forms the basis of language/meaning. Such changes of meaning are also often centres of political violence, as is apparent in the differences invested in male/female, master/slave, citizen/foreigner etc. Derrida seeks to modulate and question these "violent hierarchies" through deconstruction.

Perhaps it is a misconception that différance seeks contradictory meanings. It does not necessarily do so. It can, but what it usually describes is the re-experience, the re-arrival of the moment of reading. Roland Barthes remarked that "those who fail to reread are obliged to read the same story everywhere". This wry comment summarizes the phenomenon of different experience for each iteration.

In discussing just one text we are discussing every text. No distinction is necessarily made between texts in this "basic" level. The difference/deferral can be between one text and itself, or between two texts; this is the crucial distinction between traditional perspectives and deconstruction.

== Deconstruction and the history of philosophy ==
Derrida's neographism (rather than neologism because "neologism" would propose a logos, a metaphysical category; and (more simply) because, when uttered in French, "différance" is indistinguishable from "difference"—it is thus only a graphical modification, having nothing to do with a spoken logos) is, of course, not just an attempt at linguistics or to discuss written texts and how they are read. It is, most importantly, an attempt to escape the history of metaphysics; a history that has always prioritised certain concepts, e.g., those of substance, essence, soul, spirit (idealism), matter (realism), becoming, freedom, sense-experience, language, science etc. All such ideas imply self-presence and totality. Différance, instead, focuses on the play of presence and absence, and, in effecting a concentration of certain thinking, Derrida takes on board the thought of Freud's unconscious (the trace), Heidegger's destruction of ontotheology, Nietzsche's play of forces, and Bataille's notion of sacrifice in contrast to Hegel's Aufheben.

Différance is not only irreducible to any ontological or theological—ontotheological—reappropriation, but as the very opening of the space in which ontotheology—philosophy—produces its system and its history, it includes ontotheology, inscribing it and exceeding it without return.

Yet he does not approach this absence and loss with the nostalgia that marks Heidegger's attempt to uncover some original truths beneath the accretions of a false metaphysics that have accumulated since Socrates. Rather it is with the moods of play and affirmation that Derrida approaches the issue.

However, Derrida himself never claimed to have escaped from the metaphysics with what he has done. To the contrary, he criticises others for claiming to have demolished metaphysics thoroughly.

=== Negative theology ===
Derrida's non-concept of différance, resembles, but is not, negative theology, an attempt to present a tacit metaphysics without pointing to any existent essence as the first cause or transcendental signified. Following his presentation of his paper "Différance" in 1968, Derrida was faced with an annoyed participant who said, "It [différance] is the source of everything and one cannot know it: it is the God of negative theology." Derrida's answer was, "It is and it is not."

In contrast to negative theology, which posits something supereminent and yet concealed and ineffable, différance is not quite transcendental, never quite "real", as it is always and already deferred from being made present. As John Caputo writes, "Différance is but a quasi-transcendental anteriority, not a supereminent, transcendental ulteriority." The differences and deferrings of différance, Derrida points out, are not merely ideal, they are not inscribed in the contours of the brain nor do they fall from the sky, the closest approximation would be to consider them as historical, that is, if the word history itself did not mean what it does, the airbrushing speech of the victor/vanquished.

Derrida has shown an interest in negative or apophatic theology, one of his most important works on the topic being his essay "Sauf le nom".

== Life and technics ==
In Of Grammatology, Derrida states that grammatology is not a "science of man" because it is concerned with the question of "the name of man." This leads Derrida into a consideration of the work of André Leroi-Gourhan, and in particular his concepts of "program," "exteriorisation," and "liberation of memory." Derrida writes: "Leroi-Gourhan no longer describes the unity of man and the human adventure thus by the simple possibility of the graphie in general; rather as a stage or an articulation in the history of life—of what I have called différance—as the history of the grammè." Derrida thus explicitly refers the term différance to life, and in particular to life as the history of inscription and retention, whether this is genetic or technological (from writing to "electronic card indexes"). And thus grammatology is not a science of man because it deconstructs any anthropocentrism, in the sense that the inscription in question falls on both sides of the divide human/non-human.

Yet, in the article "Différance", Derrida refers différance not to physis, that is, life, but to "all the others of physis—tekhnè, nomos, thesis, society, freedom, history, mind, etc.—as physis differed and deferred, or as physis differing and deferring." Bernard Stiegler argues in his book, Technics and Time, 1, that this represents a hesitation in Derrida: "Now phusis as life was already différance. There is an indecision, a passage remaining to be thought. At issue is the specificity of the temporality of life in which life is inscription in the nonliving, spacing, temporalisation, differentiation, and deferral by, of and in the nonliving, in the dead." What this suggests to Stiegler is that grammatology—a logic of the grammè—must be supplemented with a history of grammatisation, a history of all the forms and techniques of inscription, from genetics to technics, each stage of which will be found to possess its own logic. Only in this way can différance be thought as the differing and deferral of life (life as the emergence of a difference from non-life, specifically as the deferral of entropy), and as the difference from physis through which the human must inevitably be defined (the human as the inauguration of another memory, neither the memory of genetics nor that of the individual, but rather a memory consisting in "inscription in the nonliving," that is, technical memory).
