= Technogenesis =

Technogenesis may refer to:

- The views of Bernard Stiegler regarding the relation between humans origins and technology.
- An educational procedure by the Stevens Institute of Technology.
