= The Decadence of Industrial Democracies =

The Decadence of Industrial Democracies: Disbelief and Discredit, Volume 1
- Author: Bernard Stiegler
- Original title: Mécréance et Discrédit: Tome 1, La décadence des démocraties industrielles
- Translators: Daniel Ross, Suzanne Arnold
- Language: French
- Published: 2004
- Publication place: France
- Media type: Print
- Pages: 200
- ISBN: 978-0745648101

The Decadence of Industrial Democracies: Disbelief and Discredit, Volume 1 (French: Mécréance et Discrédit: Tome 1, La décadence des démocraties industrielles) is a 2004 book by the French philosopher Bernard Stiegler. The French original was published by Galilée. The English translation by Daniel Ross and Suzanne Arnold was published by Polity Press in 2011. It is the first volume of a three-volume series; the second and third volumes were published in French in 2006.

== Secondary literature ==
- Tom Bunyard, Technoreformism
- Daniel Ross, The Cinematic Condition of the Politico-Philosophical Future.
- Daniel Ross, Politics and Aesthetics, or, Transformations of Aristotle in Bernard Stiegler.
