= Yuk Hui =

Hong Kong philosopher

- 許煜
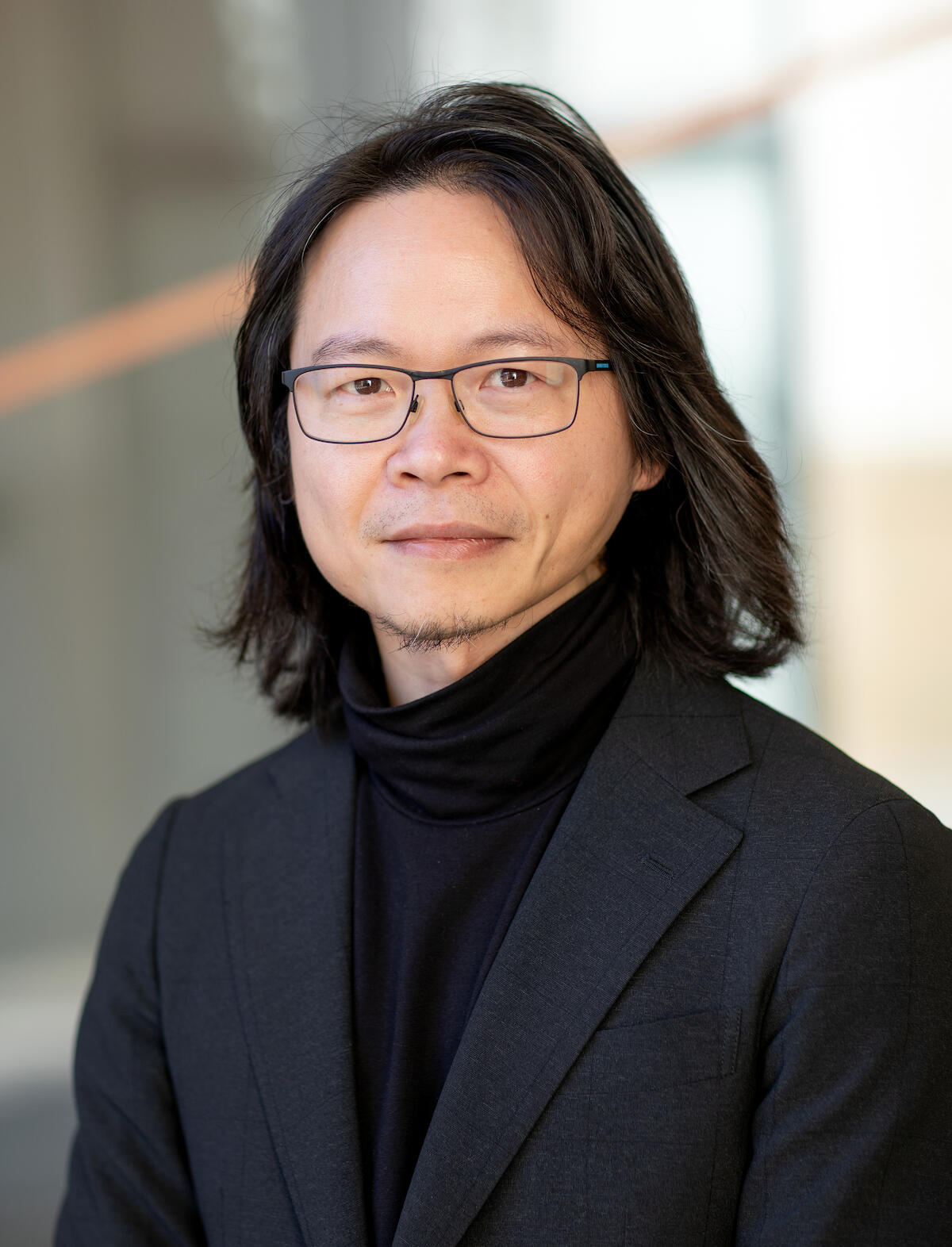
- Born: 1985 (age 40–41)

Education
- Education: University of Hong Kong (BEng); Goldsmiths, University of London (Ph.D.); Leuphana University of Lüneburg (Dr. habil.)
- Doctoral advisor: Bernard Stiegler

Philosophical work
- School: Continental philosophy
- Main interests: Philosophy of technology, history of philosophy, history of technology, cybernetics
- Notable ideas: Technodiversity, cosmotechnics

Yuk Hui (Chinese: 許煜; born 1985) is a Hong Kong philosopher and Professor of Philosophy at Erasmus University Rotterdam. He is known for his writings on philosophy and technology. Hui has been described as one of the most influential contemporary philosophers of technology.

== Education ==
Hui studied computer engineering at the University of Hong Kong, wrote his doctoral thesis under the French philosopher Bernard Stiegler at Goldsmiths, University of London, and obtained his habilitation in philosophy of technology from Leuphana University of Lüneburg.

== Career ==
Hui has taught at the Leuphana University, Bauhaus University, and has been a visiting professor at the China Academy of Art and the University of Tokyo. He has been the convenor of the Research Network for Philosophy and Technology since 2014 and sits as a juror of the Berggruen Prize for Philosophy and Culture since 2020. He currently teaches at the Erasmus University Rotterdam and the City University of Hong Kong.

== Influence and concepts ==
Hui works on the intersection between technology and philosophy. He originated the term "cosmotechnics" which recognises the unification of cosmic and moral orders through technical activities in order to overcome the conceptual dualism of technics and nature.

His first monograph, titled On the Existence of Digital Objects (2016), an homage to the work of Gilbert Simondon, was prefaced by Bernard Stiegler. The book was endorsed by Jahrbuch Technikphilosophie as having "all the qualities of becoming a genuine classic in the future." Hui's second book, The Question Concerning Technology in China: An Essay in Cosmotechnics (2016) is a response to Martin Heidegger's 1953 essay "The Question Concerning Technology". Hui posited that the concept of technology in Western philosophical literature may not coincide with that of China and suggested reconstructing a technological thought in China. The American philosopher of technology Carl Mitcham, in a review of Hui's book, writes "There is no more challenging work for anyone interested in trying to understand both the manifold philosophical challenges of Western scientific technology and the contemporary rise of China on the world-historical scene." Hui's work on Chinese philosophy of technology has contributed to discourse around sinofuturism.

Hui's third monograph, Recursivity and Contingency (2019), is a philosophical treatise of cybernetics. A review in The Philosophical Quarterly states that "Despite the historical span of roughly 250 years, the diverse range of authors, disciplines and underlying problems, Recursivity and Contingency is held together firmly by its two eponymous concepts." The professor Bruce Clarke, in his review for the American Book Review, states that "Recursivity and Contingency submits cybernetics to a massive genealogical reading grounded in German idealism and Naturphilosphie, demonstrating its deepest roots in the 'organic condition of philosophizing' since Immanuel Kant, which has developed the concept of the organic in a way that subordinates the phenomenon of technicity to a more general definition of organism." Hui continues his trilogy on recursivity in a sequel titled Art and Cosmotechnics (2021) and concluded with Machine and Sovereignty (2024), a book dedicated to what he calls planetary thinking. Hui's anthology Fragmentar el futuro, assembling his writings on politics and technology, was published in 2020 in both Portuguese and Spanish. It has received many reviews and endorsements in Latin America. The Spanish newspaper El Mundo described him as a "new superstar of thought."

Hui is most known for his concept of technodiversity and cosmotechnics, which is based on what he calls the antinomy of the universality of technology. The intention is to diverge away from the conception of a universal science and technology which came out of Western modernity and escalated on a global scale today. Hui proposes to rediscover the history of technodiversity to cultivate different conceptions of technology through diverse forms of thinking and practice in order to invent alternatives. He calls on others to contribute to the project of cultivating technodiversity through an investigation of technological thought through different epistemologies to open to a diversification of technologies in our modern world. The journal Angelaki (vol. 25 issue 4, 2020), Ellul Forum (Issue 68, 2021) and Footprint Delft Architecture Theory Journal (No.35, 2025) dedicated a special issue on Hui's concept of cosmotechnics.

== Bibliography ==
=== Monographs ===
- On the Existence of Digital Objects, pref. Bernard Stiegler, University of Minnesota Press, 2016. ISBN 9780816698905 (Translations: Spanish, Chinese, Korean)
- The Question Concerning Technology in China: An Essay in Cosmotechnics, Falmouth: Urbanomic, 2016. ISBN 9780995455009 (Translations: German, French, Spanish, Italian, Chinese, Japanese, Korean, Russian)
- Recursivity and Contingency, pref. Howard Caygill, London: Rowman and Littlefield, 2019. ISBN 9781786600530 (Translations: Spanish, Polish, Chinese, Japanese, Korean, Russian)
- Art and Cosmotechnics, Minneapolis: University of Minnesota Press, 2021. ISBN 9781517909543 (Translations: Spanish, Japanese, Korean, Chinese, Russian)
- Post-Europe, New York: Sequence Press/Urbanomic, 2024. ISBN 9798985423518
- Machine and Sovereignty, Minneapolis: University of Minnesota press, 2024. ISBN 9781517917418
- Kant Machine, London: Bloomsbury, 2026. ISBN 9781350602502

=== Anthologies ===
- Fragmentar el futuro: ensayos sobre tecnodiversidad, Buenos Aires: Caja Negra, 2020. ISBN 9789871622894 (Spanish)
- Tecnodiversidade, trans. Humberto do Amaral, São Paulo: Ubu, 2021. ISBN 9786586497229 (Brazilian Portuguese)
- Teknodiversitet, trans. Anders Dunker, Oslo: Existenz Forlag, 2022. ISBN 9788269190991 (Norwegian)
- Pensare la Contingenza. La rinascita della filosofia dopo la cibernetica, Rome: Castelvecchi, 2022. ISBN 9788832907216 (Italian)
- Technodiverzita, Prague: UMPRUM, 2022. ISBN 9788088308546 (Czech)
- Tecnodiversità. Tecnologia e politica, Rome: Castelvecchi, 2024. ISBN 979-12-5614-036-7 (Italian)
- 在机器的边界思考, Guilin: Guangxi Normal University Press, 2025. ISBN 978-7-5598-7574-7 (Chinese)
- Jenseits von West und Ost: Gespräch über Technik und Philosophie, Berlin: Matthes und Seitz, 2025. ISBN 978-3-7518-3011-9 (German)
- 機器與愛慾 許煜北藝大演講集, Taipei: Taipei National University of the Arts Press, 2026, ISBN 978-626-7232-73-6 (Chinese)

=== Edited volumes ===
- Cybernetics for the 21st Century Vol.1 Epistemological Reconstruction, Hanart Press, 2024. ISBN 978-988-70268-4-6
- Philosophy after Automation, Special Issue of Philosophy Today (Volume 65, Issue 2, Spring 2021)
- On Cosmotechnics, Special Issue of Angelaki, Vol 25 Issue 4 (August 2020)
- 30 Years after Les Immatériaux: Art, Science and Theory (co-edited with Andreas Broeckmann), Meson Press, 2015. ISBN 9783957960306
- Cosmotechnics For a Renewed Concept of Technology in the Anthropocene (co-edited with Pieter Lemmens), Routledge, 2021. ISBN 9780367769369

== See also ==
- Jean-François Lyotard
- Mou Zongsan
