= Primordial narcissism =

Psychiatrist Ernst Simmel first defined primordial narcissism in 1944. Simmel's fundamental thesis is that the most primitive stage of libidinal development is not the oral, but the gastro-intestinal one. Mouth and anus are merely to be considered as the terminal parts of this organic zone. Simmel terms the psychological condition of prenatal existence "primordial narcissism". It is the vegetative stage of the pre-ego, identical with the id. At this stage there is complete instinctual repose, manifested in unconsciousness. Satiation of the gastro-intestinal zone, the representative of the instinct of self-preservation, can bring back this complete instinctual repose, which, under pathological conditions, can become the aim of the instinct.

Contrary to Lasch, Bernard Stiegler argues in his book, Acting Out, that consumer capitalism is in fact destructive of what he calls primordial narcissism, without which it is not possible to extend love to others.

In other words he is referring to the natural state of an infant as a fetus and in the first few days of its life, before it has learned that other people exist besides itself, and therefore cannot possibly be aware that they are human beings with feelings.
