= Bertrand Gille (historian) =

French historian (1920–1980)

Bertrand Gille (French: [ʒil]; March 29, 1920, Paris – November 30, 1980, Paris) was a French archivist and historian of technology.

Although best known for his work on technology, Gille also wrote on diverse subjects including the history of French banking and Russian economics. After teaching at the university of Clermont-Ferrand, he became a director of studies at the École pratique des hautes études, as well as giving a course on the history of technology at the University of Paris I: Panthéon-Sorbonne.

== Early career ==
After studying at the École Nationale des Chartes, in 1943 Gille completed his thesis on the French iron industry, Les Origines de la grande industrie métallurgique en France (published 1947). In 1959 Gille published his doctoral thesis, La Banque et le crédit en France de 1815 à 1848, part of a longer work derived from the archives of several French banks. This in turn led to the publication of the two-volume, 1000 page, Histoire de la maison Rothschild (1965, 1967).

== History of technology ==
In 1962 Gille published the first volume of Histoire générale des techniques, followed in 1965 by volume two. Between these he published Les ingénieurs de la Renaissance (1964; re-edited 1978). In 1978 he published his magisterial Histoire des techniques, in which he developed his concept of "technical systems." Although it was a collaborative work, Gille himself wrote 1300 out of a total 1500 pages. This was followed by a work on ancient Greek technology entitled Les Mécaniciens grecs, la naissance de la technologie (1980). In the same year he published Petites questions et grands problèmes: la brouette, on the history of the wheelbarrow.

== Awards ==
Gille was a Corresponding Member of the Society for the History of Technology, which in 1970 awarded him its highest honour, the Leonardo da Vinci Medal.

== Influence ==
Gille's theoretical work on the history of technology was an important influence on the French philosopher of technology, Bernard Stiegler, and in particular on his book, Technics and Time, 1: The Fault of Epimetheus.

== Bibliography ==
=== Works translated into English ===
- Engineers of the Renaissance (Cambridge, Massachusetts: MIT Press, 1966).
- The History of Techniques (New York: Gordon and Breach Science Publishers, 1986, 2 vols., 1410 pages. Vol. 1: Techniques and civilizations; vol. 2: Techniques and sciences).
