= Acting Out =

Acting Out may refer to:

- Acting out, a psychological term
- Acting Out (book), a 2003 book by French philosopher Bernard Stiegler
- Acting Out (TV series), a 2016 MTV stand-up comedy TV series hosted by Lil Rel Howery
- "Acting Out" (Doctors), a 2004 television episode
- "Acting Out" (Will & Grace), a 2000 television episode
- "Acting Out", a 2009 song by Ashley Tisdale from the album Guilty Pleasure
- "Acting Out", a 2022 song by Bloc Party from the album Alpha Games
