= Pelagia Goulimari =

Greek-British academic

Pelagia Goulimari (born 1964) is a Greek-British author, editor, and academic. She specialises in literary criticism, feminist theory, continental philosophy, and writing in English from 1740 to the present. Goulimari is a Research Fellow at Somerville College, Oxford, a Senior Fellow in Feminist Studies within the Humanities Division, and a member of the Faculty of English at the University of Oxford. She co-directs the interdisciplinary MSt programme in Women's, Gender and Sexuality Studies, as well as the Intersectional Humanities network at TORCH (The Oxford Research Centre in the Humanities). In 1993, Goulimari co-founded Angelaki, an academic journal in literary criticism and theory, philosophy, and cultural studies published by Routledge. She remains the journal's editor-in-chief.

Goulimari has published widely on literary criticism and theory, particularly postmodernism, and on the work of Toni Morrison, Gilles Deleuze, Virginia Woolf, and Pamela Sue Anderson, among others.

== Publications ==
- "After Modernism: Women, Gender, Race". Routledge & CRC Press.
- "The Oxford Encyclopedia of Literary Theory". Oxford Research Encyclopedia of Literature.
- "Love and Vulnerability: Thinking with Pamela Sue Anderson". Routledge & CRC Press.
- "Women Writing Across Cultures: Present, past, future". Routledge & CRC Press.
- "Literary Criticism and Theory: From Plato to Postcolonialism". Routledge & CRC Press.
- "Toni Morrison". Routledge & CRC Press.
- "Manchester University Press - Postmodernism. What moment?". Manchester University Press.
