= Acting Out (book) =

Book by Bernard Stiegler

- Author: Bernard Stiegler
- Publisher: Stanford University Press
- Publication date: 2009
- ISBN: 9780804758697

Acting Out is a book by French philosopher Bernard Stiegler.

It is composed of two short works, "How I Became a Philosopher", and "To Love, To Love Me, To Love Us: From September 11 to April 21", which were published separately in French in 2003 as Passer à l'acte and Aimer, s'aimer, nous aimer: Du 11 septembre au 21 avril. Acting Out was published by Stanford University Press in 2009, and the translators were David Barison, Daniel Ross, and Patrick Crogan.

== How I Became a Philosopher ==
This section of the work was originally delivered as an oral presentation, a kind of "confession" à la Jean-Jacques Rousseau, in which Stiegler admits for the first time that he became a philosopher while incarcerated for a period of five years. Stiegler tells the story of his transformation in prison, a transformation which took the form of rediscovering the world in a quasi-phenomenological fashion. The chapter draws from the work of Edmund Husserl, Aristotle, and Epictetus.

== To Love, To Love Me, To Love Us: From September 11 to April 21 ==
This section of the work is a discussion of the ways in which modern society is leading to a loss of a sense of existence, thus a destruction of what Stiegler calls "primordial narcissism", resulting in the proliferation of all kinds of individual and collective pathological behaviours. He outlines his theory of individuation (drawn in part from the work of Gilbert Simondon), and the compositional relation of synchronic and diachronic processes, in order to argue that a consumer society founded on television advertising produces hyper-synchronising and hyper-diachronising processes which threaten human desire and therefore human existence. Examples discussed of the consequences of these processes include the September 11, 2001 attacks, the success of the French National Front, and the Nanterre massacre perpetrated by Richard Durn.

== Secondary literature ==
- Heckman, Davin, Review of Acting Out.
- Hui, Yuk, "Individualization and the Play of Memories" (review of Acting Out), Parallax 16 (2010): 117–20.
- Rajski, Brian, "Review of Disorientation and Acting Out," Radical Philosophy 158 (2009): 50–3.
