= André Leroi-Gourhan =

French archeologist (1911–1986)

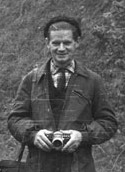
- Leroi-Gourhan in 1966
- Born: 25 August 1911; Paris, France
- Died: 19 February 1986 (aged 74); Paris, France
- Occupation: Archeologist
- Known for: Technical tendencies
- Spouse: Arlette Leroi-Gourhan
- Scientific career
- Doctoral advisor: Marcel Mauss

André Leroi-Gourhan (/ləˈrwɑː ɡuːˈrɑːn/; French: [ləʁwa guʁɑ̃]; 25 August 1911 – 19 February 1986) was a French archaeologist, paleontologist, paleoanthropologist, and anthropologist with an interest in technology and aesthetics and a penchant for philosophical reflection.

== Biography ==
Beginning in 1933, Leroi-Gourhan held various positions at museums around the world, including the British Museum and the Musée de l'Homme, as well as in Japan. Between 1940 and 1944 he worked at the Musée Guimet. In 1944 he was sent to the Château de Valençay to take care of works evacuated from the Louvre, including the Venus de Milo and the Winged Victory of Samothrace. He also participated in the French Resistance, for which he received the Croix de Guerre, the Médaille de la Résistance and the Légion d'honneur.

He completed his doctorate on the archaeology of the North Pacific in 1945 under the supervision of Marcel Mauss. He later completed a second doctorate in 1954.

In 1956, he succeeded Marcel Griaule at the Sorbonne, and from 1969 until 1982 he was a professor at the Collège de France. In 1973 he received the gold medal of the Centre national de la recherche scientifique.

== Technicity, ethnicity, milieu ==
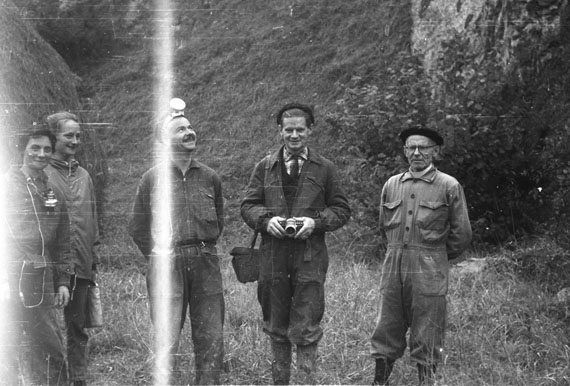
Leroi-Gourhan, with fellow archaeologists, outside the Altxerri cave

In L'Homme et la matière [Man and Matter] (1943), Leroi-Gourhan proposes the concept of technical tendencies, that is, universal technical dynamics that operate independently of the ethnic groupings which are nevertheless the only forms through which these tendencies are concretised. The concretisation of the technical tendency in a particular ethnicity he calls a technical fact.

In Milieu et techniques [Environment and Techniques] (1945), Leroi-Gourhan develops this into a general theory of the relation between the technical (as universal tendency) and the ethnic (as specific, differentiated concretisation). The human group, according to Leroi-Gourhan, behaves as though it were a living organism, assimilating its exterior milieu via "a curtain of objects", which he also calls an "interposed membrane" and an "artificial envelope", that is, technology. The milieu of the organism is divisible into the exterior milieu (geography, climate, animals and vegetation) and the interior milieu (the shared past of the group, thus "culture", etc.). This division enables a clarification of the concept of technical tendency. A tendency, according to Leroi-Gourhan, is a movement, within the interior milieu, that gains progressive foothold in the exterior milieu.

Leroi-Gourhan contributed to the methods of studying prehistoric technology, introducing the concept chaîne opératoire (operational chain) which denotes all the social acts involved in the life cycle of an artifact.

== Evolution, memory, program ==
Crucial to Leroi-Gourhan's understanding of human evolution is the notion that the transition to bipedality freed the hands for grasping, and the face for gesturing and speaking, and thus that the development of the cortex, of technology, and of language all follow from the adoption of an upright stance. What characterises humanity in its distinction from animals is thus the fact that tools and technology are a third kind of memory (in addition to the genetic memory contained in DNA and the individual memory of the nervous system), and thus a new form of anticipation, or programming. Anthropogenesis corresponds to technogenesis.

== Legacy ==
The French philosopher Jacques Derrida discusses Leroi-Gourhan in Of Grammatology (Baltimore & London: The Johns Hopkins University Press, 1997, corrected edition), in particular the concepts of "exteriorisation", "program", and "liberation of memory." This discussion was particularly important in the formulation of Derrida's neologism différance.

Leroi-Gourhan is frequently cited in the two volume collaboration by French philosopher Gilles Deleuze and psychiatrist Félix Guattari entitled Capitalism and Schizophrenia. The hand/tool and face/vocalization couplings of Leroi-Gourhan play an important role in the development of Deleuze and Guattari's concepts of becoming and deterritorialisation.

The French philosopher Bernard Stiegler gives an extensive reading of Leroi-Gourhan in Technics and Time, 1: The Fault of Epimetheus (Stanford: Stanford University Press, 1998).

== Bibliography ==
=== In French ===
- L'Homme et la matière (Paris: Albin Michel, 1943).
- Milieu et techniques (Paris: Albin Michel, 1945).
- Le geste et la parole, 2 vols. (Paris: Albin Michel, 1964–65).
- Les religions de la Préhistoire (Paris: PUF, 1964).
- Préhistoire de l'art occidental (Paris: Mazenod, 1965).
- Mécanique vivante: Le crâne des Vertébrés, du Poisson à l'Homme (Paris: Fayard, 1983).

=== English translations ===
- Prehistoric Man (New York: Philosophical Library, 1957) (an earlier translation of The Hunters of Prehistory: see below).
- Treasures of Prehistoric Art (New York: Harry N. Abrams, 1967).
- The Dawn of European Art: An Introduction to Palaeolithic Cave Painting (Cambridge: Cambridge University Press, 1982).
- Gesture and Speech (Cambridge, Massachusetts & London: MIT Press, 1993).
- The Hunters of Prehistory. Trans. Claire Jacobson. New York: Atheneum, 1989 [1983].
- André Leroi-Gourhan on Technology: A Selection of Writings from the 1930s to the 1960s. Edited by Nathan Schlanger; translated by Nils F. Schott. New York: Bard Graduate Center, 2024.

== See also ==
- Limeuil (prehistoric site)
