= Institut de recherche et d'innovation =

Research institute founded in 2006

The Institut de recherche et d'innovation (IRI; English: "Institute of Research and Innovation") was founded in 2006 to research the economic impact of digital technology and culture. Founded by Bernard Stiegler and the Centre Pompidou, the IRI became an independent body in 2008, co-sponsored by the Centre Pompidou, the Centre for Contemporary Culture of Barcelona, and Microsoft France. Other organizations have since joined the Institute, including Goldsmiths College, ENSCI, Institut Télécom, Tokyo University, Bell Labs, and France Télévisions.

== Research areas ==
The research program of the IRI is focused primarily on cognitive and cultural technologies for addressing the public in the context of the emerging web 2.0 and social networks, and to prefigure Web 3.0 technologies designed as collaborative production and sharing of equipment reviews and critical spaces. The goal is to build such devices and spaces critical to the service of amateur circles. This assumption, which is central to the future of all cultural practices, is concerned at the same time with a much broader field. In truth, it comes to the field of culture, a laboratory for thinking about the transformation of the twentieth-century consumerist society into a society based on new forms of exchange and cooperation.

The IRI undertakes three activities:

1. Explore hypotheses about the potential of the latest technologies of networks and communications devices, through the activities of the workshop, and the implementation of research groups closely associating technological engineers and practitioners technologies modeled and prototyped by the IRI (artists, art critics, teachers, hobbyists, students, etc.).
2. Theorizing and formalizing in College activities the results of this technological research to confront the objects of the sciences and humanities research in this context since the revisiting issues of more traditional disciplines ATTACHING TO aesthetics, history of art, psychology, philosophy, mainly in terms of reporting the life of the mind with techniques;
3. Staging, implementing, and testing the results of this work, in areas where critical form (concentric) circles amateurs who are cooperative workspaces are reserved for researchers is common for researchers, fans and different audiences.

This approach is based on three theoretical issues from the field of Social and Human Sciences (SHS) which intersect three objects of technological research in the field of Science and Technology of Information and Communication ( SIC and TIC ).

== Objects and theoretical research programs ==
=== Ecology of attention ===
At the time of cultural and cognitive technologies and their convergence, is discussed from both the theoretical heritage from the phenomenology (where attention is defined as that which is formed by the composition of what Husserl called retentions and protentions) and since the recent contributions of work in economics and cognitive attention. Are also taken into account the clinical pathologies in the field of attention as well as experiments conducted primarily in North America articulate what has been called deep attention with hyper attention.

=== The figure of the amateur ===
The topic is discussed in its historical and sociological but also on issues of judgment and its crosses with museum issues and the development of new cultural practices brought about by digital technologies. He was at the heart of the first edition of the new industrial world interviews that were held at the Centre Pompidou on 27 and 28 November 2007 in partnership with Les Ateliers and Cap Digital (see section c: The design of the new world industrial). The aim of this online journal is to step up from June 2009 until December 2010 as a minimum an observatory of new practices, both individually and collectively, these being specifically considered in terms of qualitative changes induced by the emergence of technologies of high-speed transmission ( fiber, WiMAX, WiFi -n, LTE, etc..), and in the context of their relationship with the issue of decentralized social networks of mobility, communication devices, and emerging forms of grammatisation or write audio and video.

=== The design of the new industrial world ===
Collaborations with many partners first and foremost we must mention Microsoft, Les Ateliers and Cap Digital on design challenges in the digital era but also in a changing environment irresistibly towards the industrial age of microtechnology, the nanotechnology and biotechnology, so that the questions design and the design must be reconsidered in depth – and analyzing the consequences of a possible revival of the figure of the amateur, or more broadly, the contributor.

==== Talks of new industrial world (ENMI) ====
Since 2007, IRI, the competitiveness cluster Cap Digital and Les Ateliers (National School of Industrial Creation) are organizing a joint event, The Analects of new industrial world, which are intended to take place every year. The first edition was held on 27 and 28 November 2007 aimed to reflect on the importance of innovation itself upward and related collaborative technologies, in terms of design and industrial design, and at a time when digital technologies are spreading like cognitive technologies and as cultural technologies, and when emerging transformational technologies ( biotechnology and nanotechnology).

==== The different themes Talks New Industrial World ====
2007: Design and Innovation bottom
2008: Political Culture and engineering social networks
2009: The new system objects
2010: Nanomondes and imaginary parts of the hyperminiaturisation
2011: Technology trust

== Objects and technological research programs ==
=== The development of critical equipment ===
Unlike the Anglo-Saxon dominance, where the term annotation tends to denote any metadata that is produced by a man or a machine, is preferred for this research subject a distinction between the process of indexing (or more generally phase of knowledge engineering which also covers the definition of ontologies ) and the annotation process (rather than on the document engineering and production of metadata or human assisted). This research claims empirical in that it starts from the analysis of cultural practices identified including operating chains of annotations that will be instrumenting (in the sense of organology generally defined by B. Stiegler ) to help overcome them. Research indexing tools, essential in the field of critical equipment, even if it is closely linked to the activity of annotation, then only intervenes.

IRI studies, designs and develops accordingly annotation tools and critical equipment of a new kind, based on a combination of documentary and metadata architectures with navigation interfaces hypermedia, modules algorithmic signal detection modules and data representation ( mapping ). The result of this research is regularly embedded software time lines, annotation platform online and offline for the annotation of temporal objects (movies, audio recordings). Research in this area is gradually extended to the field of annotation oral and written language and image annotation.

=== Experiments around collaborative technologies ===
To renew and extend beyond the current development that are grouped under the term Web 2.0, IRI conducted a series of research and experimentation in particular on the concept of "Readings signed collaborative" combining modes annotations inherited the book and still exist on the web and new paradigms for collaborative work. An important aspect of this theme is of course the development of technologies for monitoring and administration of exchanges, debates and controversies about the supported languages annotation mentioned in the previous axis. This approach incorporates the assumptions of establishing a technology semantic located, inspired by the theory of cognition located, and who had been a first exploration in the context of a program Cognisciences in 1995. This research subject in fact covers all technologies individuation and collective psychic covers both active reading technology (read / write), transcription technologies to move from rhetoric to oral speech written by example, and management tools circles.

=== Work on interfaces and motility (the movement) ===
The IRI works with the world of higher education and the university in the field of cognitive science and science education to study the long-term impact of technologies affecting the body in general and promoting the emergence new amateur, educational and professional. The motor is a crucial part of the capacity of judgment is often repeating and "gestualisant" symbolic form that we can better understand. The musical ear is formed in the eye and gestural activity coordinated by the instrument and the score, as well as the painter's eye is formed only by the activity of his hands manipulating and mastering techniques. It is through such "circuits" between organs that are formed aesthetic objects. It is particularly in this axis the study and development of new devices to address public using mobile devices in conjunction with the exhibition at the Centre Pompidou, multimodal interfaces (or poly-sensory techniques including detection of gaze) The use of microtechnology and microsystems and more generally issues digital design that arise in this context.

== Seminars ==
=== Museums, museology and new forms of public address ===
The IRI has initiated a research program on the development of new devices critical to promote the emergence of a new figure of the "amateur" in case a visitor to a museum. Confrontation of museum experiences and reflections with theoretical and scientific analysis of the impact of the new arrangements address the public on cultural practices at the heart of this axis.

 2007, engineering knowledge in the museum space
 2008/2009, critical collaborative spaces
 2009/2010, The techniques of attention
 2010/2011, Mobility and motor, under the direction of Armen Katchatourov
 2011/2012, Semantic Web and Social Web in museums, under the direction of Alexandre Monnin
 2012/2013, Digital Studies / Metadata studies: the challenges of contribution under the direction of Alexandre Monnin

=== Other Seminars Research ===
2006/2007:

 Practice and judgment
 The ability to play
 Modernities, edited by Huyghe (Paris 1)

2007/2008:

 Culture 2.0
 Desire and Technology, under the direction of Mathilde Girard
 Figures amateur, under the direction of Jacqueline Liechtenstein (Paris 4)

2008/2009

 Policies and technologies of the amateur
 Vivagora 2.0: bioengineering

2009/2010:

 Cultural Action, creation and territories
 Gesture as language, under the direction of Patricia Ribault (Paris 1)

Issues of nanoscience and nanotechnology

2007–2009:

 Issues anthropological, cultural and philosophical nanosciences and nanotechnologies, and reflection on the social uses of communicating objects, under the direction of Xavier Guchet (Paris 1) and Sacha Loeve (Paris X).

== Tools developed by IRI ==
=== Lines of Time ===
In this context, the IRI develops software time lines, a tool for collaborative annotation and analysis of films providing the user (analyst, critic or amateur) can access a "mapping" of the film from which he can insert his own comments multimedia. Software lines time draws on the possibilities for analysis and synthesis offered by the digital medium. Inspired by the "timelines" on the benches commonly used digital editing time lines provides a graphical representation of a film, its spatialization, revealing immediately and in full, its division. Time lines that offer unprecedented access to film, replacing the logic scrolling experience which is forced captive audience of any film, and for the purposes of analysis, "mapping" of a temporal object . He illustrates this point of view, the IRI will produce critical equipment likely to allow viewers to reclaim a critical modern aesthetic objects (cinema, television or radio), the scroll time tends to s impose the flow of individual consciences.

=== Polemic tweet ===
Annotation device allowing spectators to an event (present, or attending its retransmission) to add annotations in the form of tweets by typing about them in different ways (by marking the agreement, disagreement, posing a Question or indicating a reference). At the end of the event, it is possible to visualize the various positions taken by spectators synchronizing their tweets on a timeline corresponding to the video recording of it. This allows to visually identify the different "hot spots" of the controversy, through the identification performed manually by users via their annotations.
