= Limeuil (prehistoric site) =

Archaeological site in France

Coordinates: 44°53′00″N 0°53′18″E

Limeuil is a prehistoric site in the French departement Dordogne. It is renowned for nearly 200 engravings dating back to the Magdalenian.

== Geography, geology and site description ==
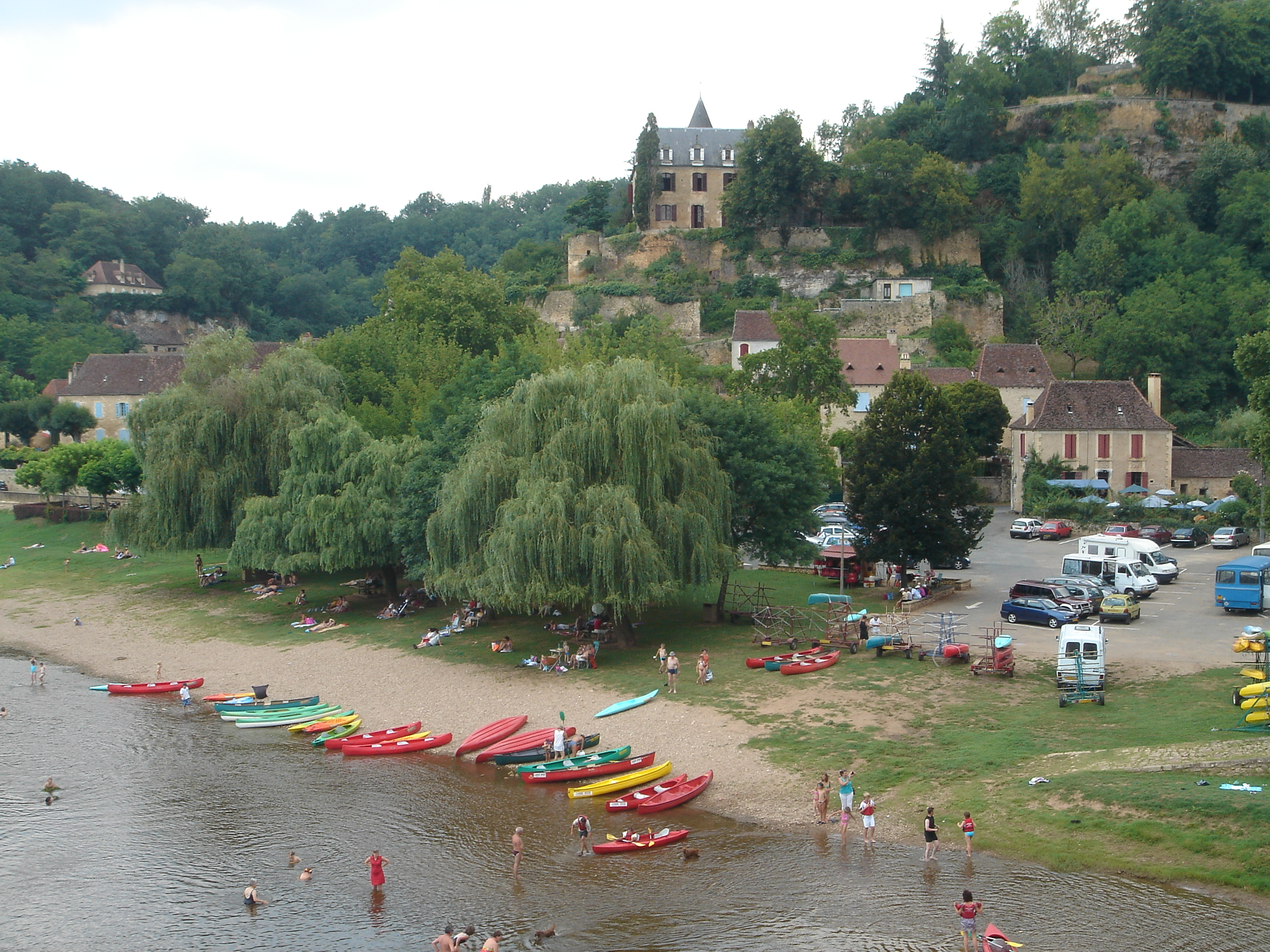
The old village center of Limeuil

The site of Limeuil is situated right in the center of the medieval village of Limeuil, near the confluence of the Vézère and the Dordogne rivers. At the close of the Upper Paleolithic the hunters had their encampment here below a small Santonian limestone ledge.

The finds were made on a 30 meter long slope below two limestone outcrops. The encampment was therefore mainly in the open, but was also enclosed later on by the partially overhanging rock ledge.

== History ==
The archeological level was found accidentally during building work at the bakery of Léo Bélanger. The Ministry of Education then mandated J. Bouyssonie, a prehistorian from Brive, with a reconnaissance excavation. The work took place between 1909 and 1913 – a very difficult task because of the built up area.

== Stratigraphy ==
All the finds from this single archeological level belong to the Magdalenian VI.

== Inventory ==
The stone artefacts are largely dominated by burins, some are of the bec de perroquet-type. Amongst the bone tools are harpoons with two rows of barbs. Characteristic for the end of the Magdalenian are engravings on bones or reindeer antlers. Amongst the art work stands out a pierced baton decorated with reindeers and fishes. On other pieces bisons and wild horses are depicted, one even carries the image of a fox – a very rare theme for the Magdalenians.

The engravings resemble the finds in Teyjat; they are very delicate and approach a nearly photographic realism. Like in Teyjat, depictions of deer and reindeer clearly dominate (about 50%), followed by horses (about 30%), aurochs, bisons and capricorns. Even two bears and the already mentioned fox are represented.

== Conclusion ==
The originality of the Limeuil site is clearly due to the roughly two hundred engravings executed on limestone slabs of different sizes. Over a hundred were published by Bouyssonie. The sheer number of slabs led André Leroi-Gourhan to the assumption that Limeuil might have been a sanctuary, an art workshop or even an “academy”.

Important for the evolution of art is the first-time depiction of the ground between the extremities of some of the animals.

== Age ==
There are no absolute dates for Limeuil, but the style of the engravings is clearly Magdalenian VI, so the art work is attributable to about 12.000 years BP.

== See also ==
- Teyjat
- Magdalenian
