= The Ister (film) =

2004 Australian documentary film by David Barison and Daniel Ross

- DVD cover
- Directed by: David Barison; Daniel Ross
- Starring: Bernard Stiegler; Jean-Luc Nancy; Philippe Lacoue-Labarthe; Hans-Jürgen Syberberg
- Release date: 23 January 2004 (International Film Festival Rotterdam)
- Running time: 189 minutes
- Country: Australia

The Ister is a 2004 documentary film directed by David Barison and Daniel Ross. The film is loosely based on the works of philosopher Martin Heidegger, in particular the 1942 lecture course he delivered, Hölderlins Hymne »Der Ister«, concerning the poem, Der Ister, by the German poet Friedrich Hölderlin. The film had its premiere at the International Film Festival Rotterdam in 2004.

== Sources ==
The Ister was inspired by a 1942 lecture course delivered by the German philosopher Martin Heidegger, published in 1984 as Hölderlins Hymne "Der Ister". Heidegger's lecture course concerns a poem by the German poet Friedrich Hölderlin about the Danube River.

The film The Ister travels conceptually and literally upstream along the Danube toward its source, as several interviewees discuss Heidegger, Hölderlin, and philosophy. The film is also concerned with a number of other themes, including: time, poetry, technology, home, war, politics, myth, National Socialism, the Holocaust, the ancient Greek polis, Sophocles, Antigone, Agnes Bernauer, Edmund Husserl, the 1991 battle of Vukovar, and the 1999 NATO bombing of Yugoslavia.

== Interviewees ==
The Ister features extensive interviews with the French philosophers Bernard Stiegler, Jean-Luc Nancy, and Philippe Lacoue-Labarthe, as well as with the German film director Hans-Jürgen Syberberg. Other interviews are conducted with a bridge engineer (Nemanja Calic), an amateur botanist (Tobias Maier), and a Romanian archaeologist (Alexandru Suceveanu).

An extended interview with philosopher Werner Hamacher is also included as one of the "extra features" on the DVD.

== Locations ==
The film travels nearly 2,000 miles upriver from the Danube Delta, that opens onto the Black Sea in Romania, to the source of the river in the Black Forest of southern Germany, moving along the way through the Histria (Sinoe) archaeological site, through Novi Sad in Serbia, Vukovar in Croatia, Budapest, Dunaföldvár, and Dunaújváros in Hungary, and Vienna and the Mauthausen-Gusen concentration camp in Austria. Also featured are the Walhalla temple near Regensburg, the Befreiungshalle at Kelheim, the tomb of Agnes Bernauer, and the castle at Sigmaringen to which Marshal Pétain fled in 1945.

Notable places from Heidegger's own life which feature in the film include his birthplace in Meßkirch, his hut at Todtnauberg, and the lecture theatre at Freiburg University where he delivered his infamous Rectoratsrede (rectorial address).

Eventually the film arrives at Donaueschingen, and at the Breg and the Brigach, the two tributaries whose confluence marks the point at which the river becomes known as the Danube. The film then travels upstream along the Breg, past Vöhrenbach and Furtwangen, in search of the "true" mountain source of the Danube.

== Structure ==
The Ister is divided into five chapters, plus a prologue and epilogue:

- Prologue. The myth of Prometheus, or The birth of technics. Bernard Stiegler tells the myth of Prometheus.
- Chapter 1. Now come fire! "In which the philosopher Bernard Stiegler conjugates technology and time, and guides us from the mouth of the Danube to the city of Vukovar in Croatia."
- Chapter 2. Here we wish to build. "In which the philosopher Jean-Luc Nancy takes up the question of politics and guides us through the Republic of Hungary."
- Chapter 3. When the trial has passed. "In which philosopher Philippe Lacoue-Labarthe conducts us from the technopolis of Vienna to the depths of the concentration camp at Mauthausen, confronting Heidegger's most provocative statement concerning technology."
- Chapter 4. The rock has need of cuts. "In which philosopher Bernard Stiegler returns to guide us deeper into the questions of mortality and history, as we emerge from Mauthausen to the Hall of Liberation in Germany."
- Chapter 5. What that river does, no-one knows. "In which the German artist and director Hans-Jürgen Syberberg guides us through the upper Danube, to the source of the river and beyond."
- Epilogue. Heidegger reads Hölderlin. Heidegger reads Hölderlin's hymn, "Der Ister."

== Soundtrack ==
Three excerpts from classical works feature in the film:

- Anton Bruckner, Symphony No. 4 in E-flat major, first movement.
- Richard Wagner, "Siegfried's Funeral March," from Götterdämmerung, Act 3.
- Franz Schubert, Impromptu D. 899 (Op. 90), No. 1 in C minor.

== Premiere and awards ==
The Ister premiered at the International Film Festival Rotterdam on 23 January 2004. It has won two awards:

- The Prix du Groupement National des Cinémas de Recherche (GNCR) at the Festival International du Documentaire de Marseille (August 2004).
- The Prix de l’AQCC (Association Québécoise des Critiques/Quebec Association of Film Critics) at the Festival du Nouveau Cinéma in Montreal (October 2004).

Additionally, Robert Koehler, film critic for Variety, listed The Ister as the second best film released theatrically in the United States in 2006.

== Reception ==
On Rotten Tomatoes, the film holds an 88% approval rating, based on 8 reviews, with an average rating of 7.1/10. On Metacritic, the film holds a score of 75 out of 100, based on 6 reviews.
