= Épineuil-le-Fleuriel =

- Commune
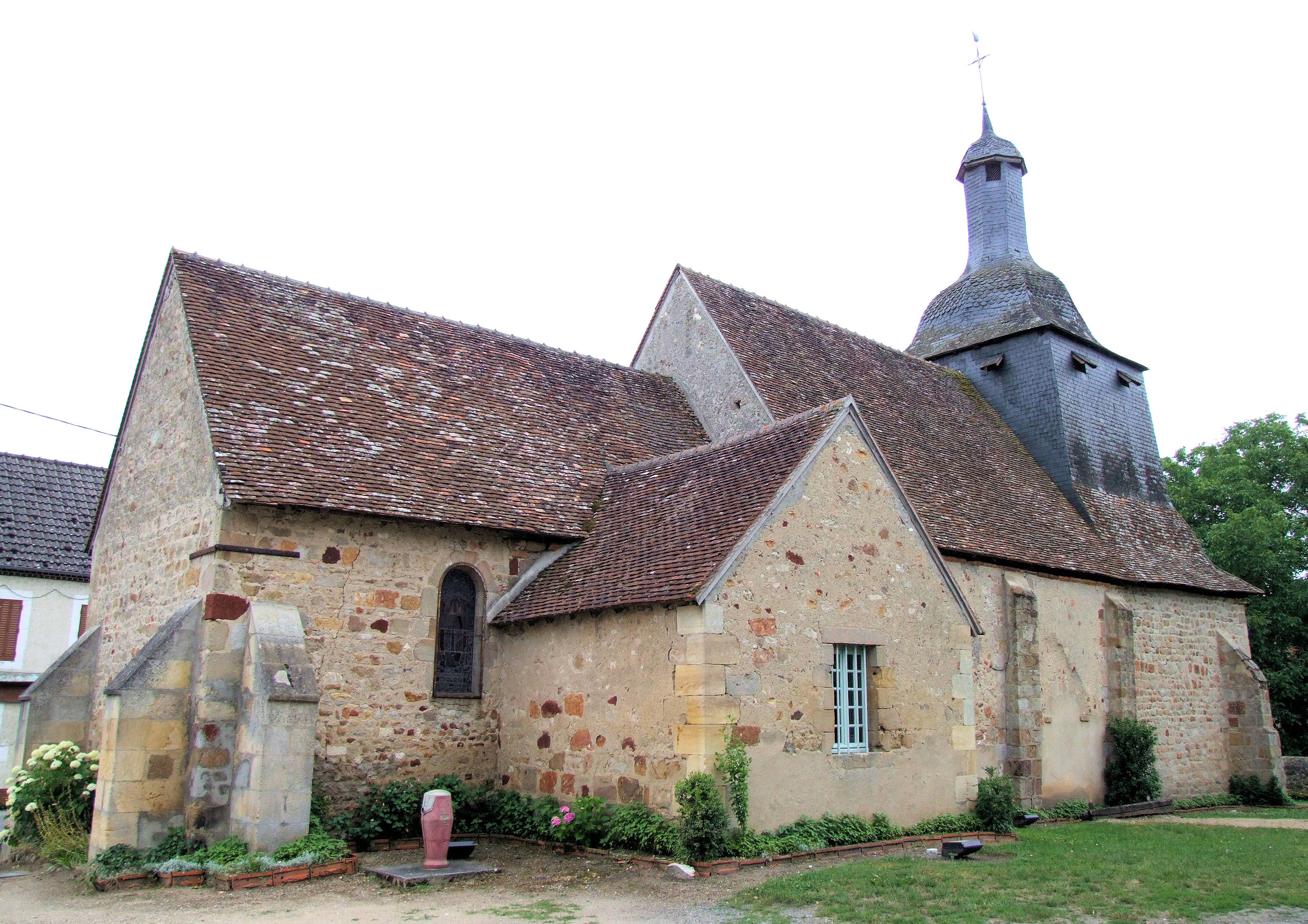
- St Martin's church
- Location of Épineuil-le-Fleuriel
- Location within France Location within Centre-Val de Loire
- Coordinates: 46°33′35″N 2°35′04″E
- Country: France
- Region: Centre-Val de Loire
- Department: Cher
- Arrondissement: Saint-Amand-Montrond
- Canton: Châteaumeillant

Government
  - Mayor (2020–2026): Mylène Pierrard
- Area^{1}: 41.6 km^{2} (16.1 sq mi)
- Elevation: 183 m (600 ft)
- Highest elevation: 260 m (850 ft)
- Lowest elevation: 163 m (535 ft)
- Population (2023): 436
  - Density: 10.5/km^{2} (27.1/sq mi)
- Time zone: UTC+01:00 (CET)
  - Summer (DST): UTC+02:00 (CEST)
- INSEE/Postal code: 18089 /18360
- ^{1} French Land Register data, which excludes lakes, ponds, glaciers > 1 km^{2} (0.386 sq mi or 247 acres) and river estuaries.

Épineuil-le-Fleuriel (French pronunciation: [epinœj lə flœʁjɛl]; Occitan: Espinuelh de Flurièt) is a commune in the Cher department in the Centre-Val de Loire region of France.

== Geography ==
An area of lakes, streams and farming consisting of the village and several hamlets situated by the banks of both the river Cher and the canal de Berry, some 37 miles (60 km) south of Bourges at the junction of the D4, D64 and the D97 roads. The A71 autoroute runs through the western part of the territory of the commune and it shares a border with the department of Allier.

== Population ==
Historical population
Year	Pop.	±% p.a.
1968	681	—
1975	578	−2.32%
1982	551	−0.68%
1990	478	−1.76%
1999	414	−1.58%
2007	452	+1.10%
2012	459	+0.31%
2017	443	−0.71%
2023	436	−0.27%
Source: INSEE

== Sights ==
- St Martin's church, dating from the twelfth century.
- The eighteenth-century chateau of Cornançay.
- The nineteenth-century school and museum of writer Alain-Fournier.
- A feudal motte with a moat.
- Traces of another medieval castle.
- The chateau of Fougerolles.
- Old tile works at la Bouchatte.
- A washhouse at Cornançay.

== Personalities ==
- Alain-Fournier, writer, spent his childhood here, where his parents taught at the school. The setting of his novel, Le Grand Meaulnes, is based on the area around the village.

== See also ==
- Communes of the Cher department
