= Technics and Time, 1 =

Book by french philosopher Bernard Stiegler (published:1994)

Technics and Time, 1: The Fault of Epimetheus
- Author: Bernard Stiegler
- Language: French
- Subject: Philosophy
- Published: 1994
- Publication place: France
- Media type: Print
- ISBN: 978-0804730419

Technics and Time, 1: The Fault of Epimetheus (French: La technique et le temps, 1: La faute d'Épiméthée) is a book by the French philosopher Bernard Stiegler, first published by Galilée in 1994.

The English translation, by George Collins and Richard Beardsworth, was published by Stanford University Press in 1998. The Technics and Time series is the fullest systematic statement by Stiegler of his philosophy, and the first volume draws on the work of Martin Heidegger, André Leroi-Gourhan, Gilbert Simondon, Bertrand Gille, Jean-Jacques Rousseau, and Jean-Pierre Vernant in order to outline and develop Stiegler's major philosophical theses. The series consists of three books.

== Overview ==
Stiegler argues that "technics" forms the horizon of human existence. This fact has been suppressed throughout the history of philosophy, which has never ceased to operate on the basis of a distinction between episteme and tekhne. The thesis of the book is that the genesis of technics corresponds not only to the genesis of what is called "human" but of temporality as such, and that this is the clue toward understanding the future of the dynamic process in which the human and the technical consists.

- Part I conducts a reading of approaches to the history of technology and the origin of hominisation, in particular by André Leroi-Gourhan, Gilbert Simondon, and Bertrand Gille. The outcome of this reading is the thought that history cannot be thought according to the idea that humanity is the "subject" of this history and technology simply the object. When it comes to the relation between the human and the technical, the "who" and the "what" are in an undecidable relation.
- Part II is largely a reading of the work of Martin Heidegger in terms of the above consideration. Stiegler argues that Heidegger's philosophy fails adequately to grasp that, if there is such a thing as authentic temporality, the only access to it can be via objects, artefacts and, in general, technics, without which access to the past and future is impossible as such. Crucial to Stiegler's formulation of his understanding of humanity, technology, and time, is his reading of the myth of Prometheus.

== Influences ==
The French writer Maurice Blanchot is referenced in the first three volumes of Technics and Time. Starting in the first volume, Stiegler refers to the notion of the "appallingly ancient" (l'effroyablement ancien), which he attributes to Blanchot.

== Succeeding volumes ==
Stiegler published three volumes in the Technics and Time series. The Fault of Epimetheus was followed by Tome 2: La désorientation (1996) and Tome 3: Le temps du cinéma et la question du mal-être (2001). Volume Two was published in translation by Stanford University Press in 2008 with the subtitle, Disorientation. Volume Three appeared in 2010 with the subtitle, Cinematic Time and the Question of Malaise (both volumes translated by Stephen Barker).
