= Angelaki =

- Discipline: Theoretical humanities
- Language: English
- Edited by: Pelagia Goulimari

Publication details
- History: 1993–present
- Publisher: Routledge
- Frequency: Bimonthly
- Open access: Hybrid
- Impact factor: 0.2 (2023)

Standard abbreviations
- ISO 4: Angelaki

Indexing
- ISSN: 0969-725X (print); 1469-2899 (web)
- LCCN: sv97029725
- OCLC no.: 978975565

Links
- Journal homepage; Online access; Online archive

Angelaki: Journal of the Theoretical Humanities is a bimonthly peer-reviewed academic journal that was established in 1993. It covers "work in the disciplinary fields of literary criticism and theory, continental philosophy, and cultural studies." Since 1998, it has been published by Routledge. The editor-in-chief is Pelagia Goulimari (University of Oxford), who was also the founding executive editor. In 1996, Angelaki was named "Best New Journal" in the annual awards of the Council of Editors of Learned Journals.

From 1993 until 2010, the journal published three issues a year. This was increased to four issues per year in 2011 and to six issues in 2018. Since then, a single volume has normally comprised four special issues and two general issues.

== Associated book series ==
In 1996, editors of the journal established an associated book series, Angelaki Humanities, with Manchester University Press. In July 2021, a new series, Angelaki: New Work in the Theoretical Humanities, was established with Routledge.

== Abstracting and indexing ==
The journal is abstracted and indexed in:

- Arts and Humanities Citation Index
- Current Contents/Arts & Humanities
- EBSCO databases
- Modern Language Association Database
- Philosopher's Index
- ProQuest databases
- Scopus
- Sociological Abstracts

According to the Journal Citation Reports, the journal has a 2023 impact factor of 0.2.
