= Bernard Stiegler =

French philosopher (1952–2020)

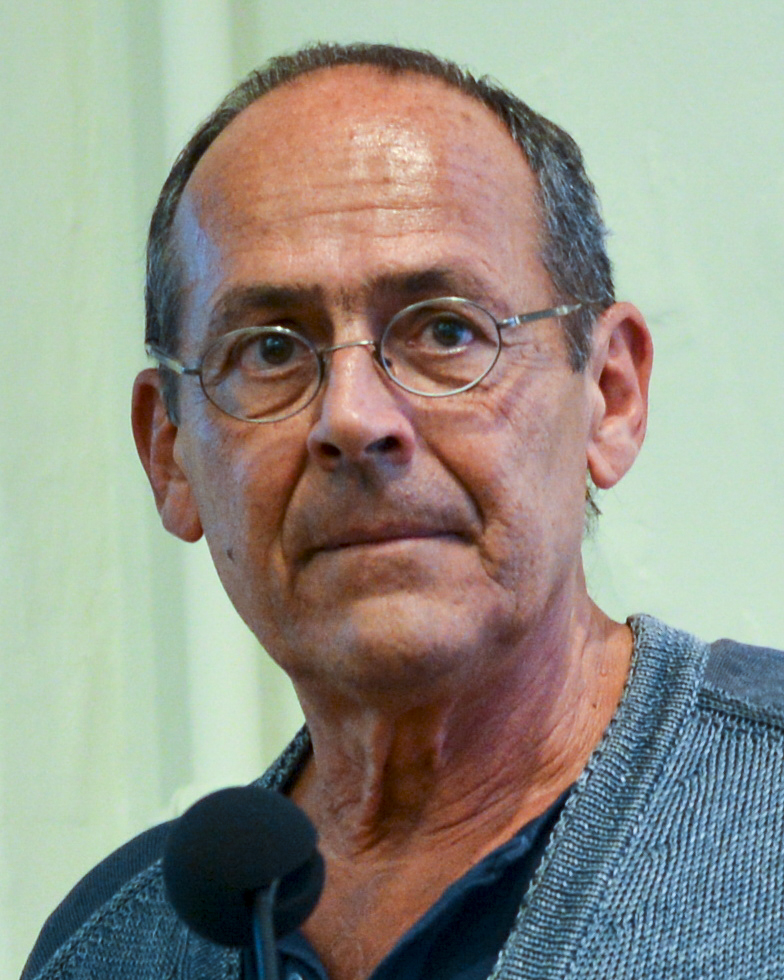
- Bernard Stiegler in 2016
- Born: 1 April 1952; Villebon-sur-Yvette, France
- Died: 5 August 2020 (aged 68); Épineuil-le-Fleuriel, France
- Political party: PCF (1960s–1976)

Education
- Education: Université de Toulouse-Le Mirail; EHESS (PhD, 1993)
- Doctoral advisor: Jacques Derrida

Philosophical work
- Era: Contemporary philosophy
- Region: Western philosophy
- School: Continental philosophy Deconstruction; Post-structuralism
- Institutions: Institut de recherche et d'innovation (Centre Georges-Pompidou)
- Doctoral students: Yuk Hui
- Main interests: Philosophy of technology · Individuation
- Notable ideas: Symbolic misery (mass exclusion from cultural production as a form of generalized impoverishment)

Bernard Stiegler (French: [bɛʁnaʁ stiɡlɛʁ]; 1 April 1952 – 5 August 2020) was a French philosopher. He was head of the Institut de recherche et d'innovation (IRI), which he founded in 2006 at the Centre Georges-Pompidou. He was also founder of the political and cultural group Ars Industrialis in 2005. In 2010, he established the philosophy school, pharmakon.fr, held at Épineuil-le-Fleuriel. He co-founded Collectif Internation, a group of "politicised researchers" in 2018. His best known work is Technics and Time, 1: The Fault of Epimetheus.

Stiegler has been described as "one of the most influential European philosophers of the 21st century" and an important theorist of the effects of digital technology.

== Early life and education ==
Bernard Stiegler was born in Villebon-sur-Yvette, France. Growing up, he took an interest in politics, aligning with beliefs from left-wing politics and the French Communist Party (PCF) by the time he was 16. He dropped out of high school and instead took part in student revolts against then president Charles de Gaulle. However, in 1976, he left the Communist Party.

Following his departure from the political scene, Bernard would spend his 20s working a wide variety of jobs, including farming, office work, being a shop clerk, and manual labor, as well as owning a jazz bar.

Between 1978 and 1983 Stiegler was incarcerated for armed robbery, first at the Prison Saint-Michel in Toulouse, and then at the Centre de détention in Muret. It was during this period that he became interested in philosophy, studying through correspondence with Gérard Granel at the Université de Toulouse-Le Mirail. He recounts his transformation in prison in his book, Passer à l'acte (2003; the English translation of this work is included in the 2009 volume Acting Out).

== Career ==
In 1987–88, with Catherine Counot, Stiegler commissioned an exhibition at the Centre Georges-Pompidou, entitled Mémoires du futur: bibliothèques et technologies. Stiegler earned his doctorate from the EHESS in 1993 under the direction of Jacques Derrida, and obtained his Habilitation in 2007 at the université Paris Diderot-Paris 7 under the direction of Dominique Lecourt. He was a Director at the Collège international de philosophie, and a professor at the Université de Technologie at Compiègne, as well as a visiting professor at Goldsmiths, University of London. He held the positions of Director General at the Institut National de l'Audiovisuel (INA), and Director General at the Institut de Recherche et Coordination Acoustique/Musique (IRCAM).

In June 2005 Stiegler founded a political and cultural group, Ars Industrialis, the manifesto of which calls for an "industrial politics of spirit." The manifesto was signed by Stiegler and the other co-founders of the group, George Collins, Marc Crépon, Catherine Perret and Caroline Stiegler. An updated manifesto was released in 2010.

On 1 January 2006 he became Director of the Department of Cultural Development at the Centre Georges-Pompidou. He was Director of the Institut de recherche et d'innovation (IRI), which was created at his initiative in April 2006.

On 18 September 2010 Stiegler opened his own philosophy school (called pharmakon.fr) in the small French town of Épineuil-le-Fleuriel, in the department of Cher across multiple disciplines. The school ran a public course for people in the region, a seminar for doctoral students and junior researchers conducted by video conference, and a summer academy that involves activists, researchers, artists, writers and both groups as well as interested inhabitants from the surrounding area. At a philosophical level, the school was engaged in research, critique and analysis in line with Stiegler's pharmacological approach.

== Personal life and death ==
Stiegler was at one time involved in a relationship with Catherine Malabou. Later he married Caroline Stiegler (née Fayat), who had been his lawyer.

Stiegler had a daughter Barbara Stiegler born 1971, who is also a philosopher and professor at the Université Bordeaux-Montaigne.

Stiegler died by suicide on 5 August 2020. Stiegler is survived by his wife, Caroline Stiegler, and four children.

== Work ==
Stiegler's work is influenced by, among others, Sigmund Freud, André Leroi-Gourhan, Gilbert Simondon, Friedrich Nietzsche, Paul Valéry, Edmund Husserl, Martin Heidegger, Karl Marx, Gilles Deleuze, Donald Winnicott, Georges Bataille, and Jacques Derrida.

Key themes are technology, time, individuation, consumerism, consumer capitalism, technological convergence, digitization, Americanization, proletarianization, education and the future of politics and human society.

Stiegler was a prolific author of books, articles and interviews, with his first book being published in 1994. His works include several ongoing series of books:

- La technique et le temps (3 vols.). The Technics and Time series outlines the heart of Stiegler's philosophical project, and in particular his theses that the role of technics has been repressed throughout the history of philosophy, and that technics, as organised inorganic matter, and as essentially a form of memory, is constitutive of human temporality. The series contains extensive readings of the works of André Leroi-Gourhan, Martin Heidegger, Edmund Husserl, and Immanuel Kant. It also contains his explication of the "cinematic constitution of consciousness," as well as his thesis that human beings are essentially "adoptive" and "prosthetic" creatures. All three extant volumes have been published in English translation by Stanford University Press.
- De la misère symbolique (2 vols.). This series is concerned in particular with the ways in which cultural, symbolic and informational technologies have become a means of industrialising the formation of desire in the service of production, with destructive consequences for psychic and collective individuation. Stiegler outlines his concepts of "general organology" (a way of thinking the co-individuation of human organs, technical organs, and social organisations) and "genealogy of the sensible" (a way of thinking the historicity of human desire and aesthetics). It contains extensive readings of Sigmund Freud and Gilles Deleuze, as well as of the works of Alain Resnais, Bertrand Bonello, Andy Warhol, and Joseph Beuys. Both volumes have been published in English translation.
- Mécréance et Discrédit (3 vols.). The Disbelief and Discredit series is concerned with the way in which the industrial organisation of production and then consumption has had destructive consequences for the modes of life of human beings, in particular with the way in which the loss of savoir-faire and savoir-vivre (that is, the loss of the knowledge of how to do and how to live), has resulted in what Stiegler calls "generalised proletarianisation." In this series Stiegler makes clear his view that, in the light of the present state of the global technical system, it is not a matter of overcoming capitalism but rather of transforming its industrial basis to prevent the loss of spirit from which it increasingly suffers. In the second volume Stiegler introduces the concept of the "Antigone complex," to describe the psychosocial effects of the destruction of authority—that is, the destruction of the superego—on politics and youth. The series contains extensive readings of Paul Valéry, Max Weber, Aristotle, and Herbert Marcuse, as well as analyses of the crisis of May 1968 and the crime of Patricia and Emmanuel Cartier. The first volume was published in English translation by Polity Press in 2011, the second in 2012 and the third in 2014.
- Constituer l'Europe (2 vols.). In this series Stiegler is concerned with the effects of the destruction of psychic and collective individuation on Europe. He argues for the necessity of inaugurating a new individuation process at the continental level, itself embedded in an individuation process operating at a global level. At stake, he says, is the creation of a new European "motive" which will enable the reinvention of industrial civilisation.
- Qu'appelle-t-on panser? (2 vols.).

=== Cinema and television ===
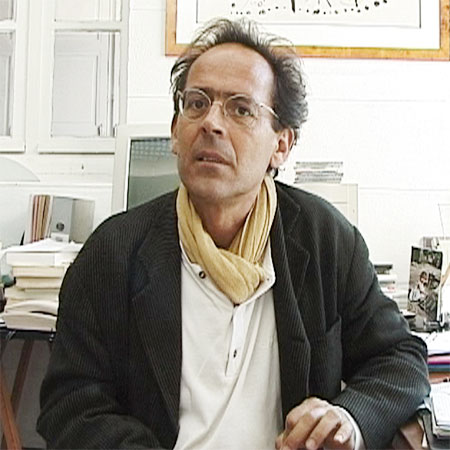
Stiegler in the film The Ister

Stiegler features prominently in a number of works of film and television, and appeared on French television numerous times.

- The Ister (2004), directed by Daniel Ross and David Barison, a feature documentary about Heidegger in which Stiegler plays an important part.
- An Organization of Dreams (2009), directed by Ken McMullen, an experimental thriller inspired by Stiegler's work, and in which he appears.
- Le temps de cerveau disponible (2010), directed by Jean-Robert Viallet, a documentary about television in which Stiegler is the main participant.
- Après la gauche (2011), directed by Jeremy Forny, a documentary about the problems of the political Left, featuring Stiegler.

== Awards ==
- Officer of the Order of Arts and Letters (2016)

== Bibliography ==
=== Books in French ===
- (1994) La technique et le temps. Tome 1, La faute d'Epiméthée. ISBN 2-7186-0440-9
- (1996) Échographies de la télévision. Entretiens filmés (with Jacques Derrida). ISBN 2-7186-0480-8
- (1996) La technique et le temps. Tome 2, La désorientation. ISBN 2-7186-0468-9
- (2001) La technique et le temps. Tome 3, Le temps du cinéma et la question du mal-être. ISBN 2-7186-0563-4
- (2003) Aimer, s'aimer, nous aimer. Du 11 septembre au 21 avril. ISBN 2-7186-0629-0
- (2003) Passer à l'acte. ISBN 2-7186-0616-9
- (2004) Mécréance et Discrédit. Tome 1, La décadence des démocraties industrielles. ISBN 2-7186-0660-6
- (2004) Philosopher par accident. Entretiens avec Elie During. ISBN 2-7186-0648-7
- (2004) De la misère symbolique. Tome 2, La Catastrophè du sensible. ISBN 2-7186-0634-7
- (2004) De la misère symbolique. Tome 1, L'époque hyperindustrielle. ISBN 2-7186-0635-5
- (2005) L'attente de l'inattendu. ISBN 2-9700474-8-9
- (2005) Constituer l'Europe. Tome 2, Le motif européen. ISBN 2-7186-0690-8
- (2005) Constituer l'Europe. Tome 1, Dans un monde sans vergogne. ISBN 2-7186-0689-4
- (2006) Réenchanter le monde. La valeur esprit contre le populisme industriel (with Marc Crépon, George Collins & Catherine Perret). ISBN 2-08-210585-7
- (2006) La télécratie contre la Démocratie. ISBN 2-08-210569-5
- (2006) Le théâtre, le peuple, la passion (with Jean-Christophe Bailly & Denis Guénoun). ISBN 2-84681-170-9
- (2006) Des pieds et des mains. Petite conférence sur l'homme et son désir de grandir. ISBN 2-227-47566-8
- (2006) Mécréance et Discrédit. Tome 3, L'esprit perdu du capitalisme. ISBN 2-7186-0715-7
- (2006) Mécréance et Discrédit. Tome 2, Les sociétés incontrolables d'individus désaffectés. ISBN 2-7186-0706-8
- (2007) Avril-22. Ceux qui préfèrent ne pas (with Alain Jugnon, Alain Badiou & Michel Surya). ISBN 2-916492-31-3
- (2007) De la démocratie participative. Fondements et limites (with Marc Crépon). ISBN 2-7555-0033-6
- (2008) Prendre Soin. Tome 1, De la jeunesse et des générations. ISBN 2-08-120736-2
- (2008) Economie de l'hypermatériel et psychopouvoir. ISBN 2-84205-945-X
- (2009) Faut-il interdire les écrans aux enfants? (with Serge Tisseron). ISBN 2-918414-12-3
- (2009) Pour en Finir avec la Mécroissance. ISBN 2-08-122492-5
- (2009) Pour une nouvelle critique de l'économie politique ISBN 2-7186-0797-1
- (2010) Ce qui fait que la vie vaut la peine d'être vécue. De la pharmacologie. ISBN 2-08-122035-0
- (2012) L'école, le numérique et la société qui vient (with Philippe Meirieu & Denis Kambouchner). ISBN 2-7555-0644-X
- (2012) Etats de choc. Bêtise et savoir au XXIe siècle. ISBN 2-7555-0645-8
- (2013) Pharmacologie du Front national. ISBN 978-2-08-128461-6
- (2015) La société automatique. Tome 1, L'avenir du travail. ISBN 2-2136-8565-7.
- (2015) L'emploi est mort, vive le travail! (with Ariel Kyrou). ISBN 978-2-75550-746-1.
- (2016) Dans la disruption. Comment ne pas devenir fou?
- (2018) Qu'appelle-t-on panser? 1. L'immense régression
- (2020) Qu'appelle-t-on panser? 2. La leçon de Greta Thunberg
- (2020) Bifurquer: Il n-y a pas d'alternative (with the Collectif Internation)

=== Books in English ===
- (1998) Technics and Time, 1: The Fault of Epimetheus (Stanford: Stanford University Press). ISBN 978-0-8047-3041-9
- (2002) Echographies of Television: Filmed Interviews (Cambridge: Polity Press), with Jacques Derrida. Including Stiegler, "The Discrete Image." ISBN 0-7456-2036-1
- (2009) Acting Out (Stanford: Stanford University Press). ISBN 0-8047-5869-7
- (2009) Technics and Time, 2: Disorientation (Stanford: Stanford University Press). ISBN 0-8047-3014-8
- (2010) Technics and Time, 3: Cinematic Time and the Question of Malaise (Stanford: Stanford University Press). ISBN 0-8047-6168-X
- (2010) For a New Critique of Political Economy (Cambridge: Polity Press). ISBN 978-0-7456-4804-0
- (2010) Taking Care of Youth and the Generations (Stanford: Stanford University Press). ISBN 0-8047-6273-2
- (2011) The Decadence of Industrial Democracies: Disbelief and Discredit, 1 (Cambridge: Polity Press). ISBN 0-7456-4810-X
- (2013) Uncontrollable Societies of Disaffected Individuals: Disbelief and Discredit, 2 (Cambridge: Polity Press). ISBN 0-7456-4812-6
- (2013) What Makes Life Worth Living: On Pharmacology (Cambridge: Polity Press). ISBN 978-0-7456-6271-8
- (2014) The Lost Spirit of Capitalism: Disbelief and Discredit, 3 (Cambridge: Polity Press). ISBN 978-0-7456-4814-9
- (2014) The Re-Enchantment of the World: The Value of Spirit Against Industrial Populism (London and New York: Bloomsbury). ISBN 978-1-4411-6925-9
- (2014) Symbolic Misery, Volume 1: The Hyper-Industrial Epoch (Cambridge: Polity Press). ISBN 978-0-7456-5264-1 (hardcover) ISBN 978-0-7456-5265-8 (paperback)
- (2015) States of Shock: Stupidity and Knowledge in the 21st Century (Cambridge: Polity Press). ISBN 0-7456-6494-6
- (2015) Symbolic Misery, Volume 2: The Catastrophe of the Sensible (Cambridge: Polity Press).
- (2016) Automatic Society, Volume 1: The Future of Work (Cambridge: Polity Press).
- (2017) Philosophising by Accident: Interview with Élie During (Edinburgh: Edinburgh University Press).
- (2018) The Neganthropocene (London: Open Humanities Press). ISBN 978-1-78542-048-1
- (2019) The Age of Disruption: Technology and Madness in Computational Capitalism (Cambridge: Polity Press).
- (2020) Nanjing Lectures 2016–2019 (London: Open Humanities Press). ISBN 978-1-78542-080-1
- (2021) Bifurcate: 'There is No Alternative', edited by Stiegler with the Internation Collective (London: Open Humanities Press).
- (2025) The Immense Regression: What is Called Caring?, Volume 1 (Berlin: K Verlag).

=== Other English translations ===
- (1993) "Questioning Technology and Time," Tekhnema 1: 31–44.
- (1996) "Persephone, Oedipus, Epimetheus," Tekhnema 3: 69–112.
- (1998) "The Time of Cinema. On the 'New World' and 'Cultural Exception'," Tekhnema 4: 62–114.
- (2001) "New Industrial Temporal Objects," in Rae Earnshaw, Richard Guedj, Andries van Dam, & John Vince (eds.), Frontiers of Human-Centred Computing, Online Communities and Virtual Environments (London: Springer-Verlag). ISBN 1-85233-238-7
- (2001) "Derrida and Technology: Fidelity at the Limits of Deconstruction and the Prosthesis of Faith," in Tom Cohen (ed.), Jacques Derrida and the Humanities (Cambridge & New York: Cambridge University Press). ISBN 0-521-62565-3
- (2002) "Transcendental Imagination in a Thousand Points," New Formations 46: 7–22.
- (2003) "Technics of Decision: An Interview," Angelaki 8: 151–67.
- (2006) "Philosophising By Accident," Public 33: 98–107, an extract from Passer à l'acte.
- (2006) "Anamnesis and Hypomnesis: The Memories of Desire," in Louis Armand & Arthur Bradley (eds.), Technicity (Prague: Litteraria Pragensia): 15–41.
- (2007) "The True Price of Towering Capitalism: Bernard Stiegler Interviewed," Queen's Quarterly 114: 340–350.
- (2007) "Technoscience and Reproduction," Parallax 13 (4): 29–45.
- (2007) "Technics, Media, Teleology: Interview with Bernard Stiegler," Theory, Culture & Society 24 (7–8): 334–41.
- (2009) "The Carnival of the New Screen: From Hegemony to Isonomy," in Pelle Snickars & Patrick Vonderau (eds.), The YouTube Reader (Stockholm: National Library of Sweden): 40–59.
- (2009) "Teleologics of the Snail: The Errant Self Wired to a WiMax Network," Theory, Culture & Society 26 (2–3): 33–45.
- (2009) "The Magic Skin; or, The Franco-European Accident of Philosophy after Jacques Derrida," Qui Parle 18: 97–110.
- (2010) "Telecracy Against Democracy," Cultural Politics 6: 171–80.
- (2010) "Memory," in W. J. T. Mitchell & Mark B. N. Hansen (eds.), Critical Terms for Media Studies (Chicago & London: University of Chicago Press): 66–87.
- (2010) "Knowledge, Care, and Trans-Individuation: An Interview with Bernard Stiegler," Cultural Politics 6: 150–70.
- (2010) "Bernard Stiegler's Pharmacy: A Conversation," Configurations 18 (3): 459–76.
- (2011) "The Tongue of the Eye: What 'Art History' Means," in Jacques Khalip & Robert Mitchell (eds.), Releasing the Image: From Literature to New Media (Stanford: Stanford University Press, 2011): 222–36.
- (2011) "The Pharmacology of the Spirit," in Jane Elliott & Derek Attridge (eds.), Theory After 'Theory' (New York: Routledge): 294–310.
- (2012) "Five Hundred Million Friends: The Pharmacology of Friendship," in Umbr(a): Technology, No. 1: 59–75.
- (2013) "Doing and Saying Stupid Things in the Twentieth Century: Bêtise and Animality in Deleuze and Derrida," Angelaki 18: 159–74.
- (2013) "The Indexing of Things," in Ulrik Ekman (ed.), Throughout: Art and Culture Emerging with Ubiquitous Computing (Cambridge, MA & London: MIT Press): 493–502.
- (2013) "Teleologics of the Snail, or the Errancies of the Equipped Self in a WiMax Network," in Ulrik Ekman (ed.), Throughout: Art and Culture Emerging with Ubiquitous Computing (Cambridge, MA & London: MIT Press): 479–92.
- (2014) "Programs of the Improbable, Short Circuits of the Unheard-of," Diacritics 42: 70–108.
- (2016) "Ars and Organological Inventions in Societies of Hyper-Control", Leonardo 49: 480–484.

== See also ==
- The European Dream
- Yuk Hui
- Individuation
- List of deconstructionists
