= Daniel Ross (philosopher) =

Australian philosopher and filmmaker

- Born: 1970 (age 55–56); Australia
- Occupations: Philosopher, writer

Daniel Ross (born 1970) is an Australian philosopher and filmmaker, best known as the author of Violent Democracy (2004) and the co-director of the film The Ister (2004). His work is influenced by Bernard Stiegler, and he is a translator or co-translator of numerous texts by Stiegler, including thirteen books.

== Education ==
Ross obtained his doctorate from Monash University in 2002, under the supervision of Michael Janover. It was entitled Heidegger and the Question of the Political and focused in particular on two of Heidegger's lecture courses, Plato's Sophist and Hölderlin's Hymn "The Ister".

== Filmography ==
- The Ister (2004). Co-directed with David Barison.

== Bibliography ==
=== Books ===
- Psychopolitical Anaphylaxis: Steps Towards a Metacosmics (London: Open Humanities Press, 2021). ISBN 978-1-78542-090-0
- Violent Democracy (Cambridge: Cambridge University Press, 2004). ISBN 0-521-60310-2

=== Thesis ===
- Heidegger and the Question of the Political (2002).
