= Hero =

Person or character who combats adversity

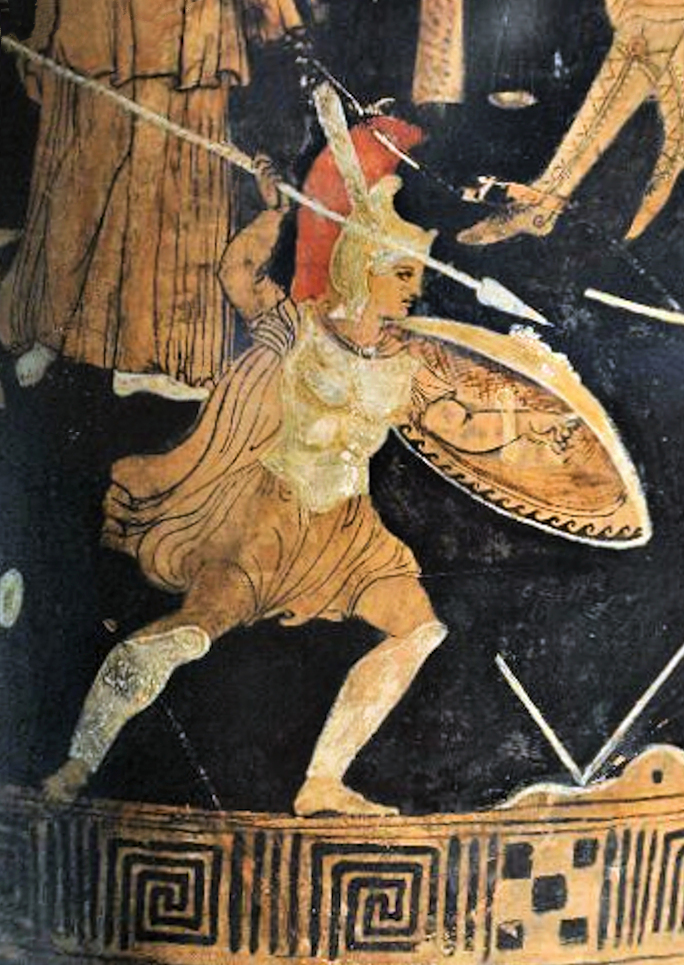
Achilles during the Trojan War, as depicted in an ancient Greek polychromatic pottery painting (dating to c. 300 BC)

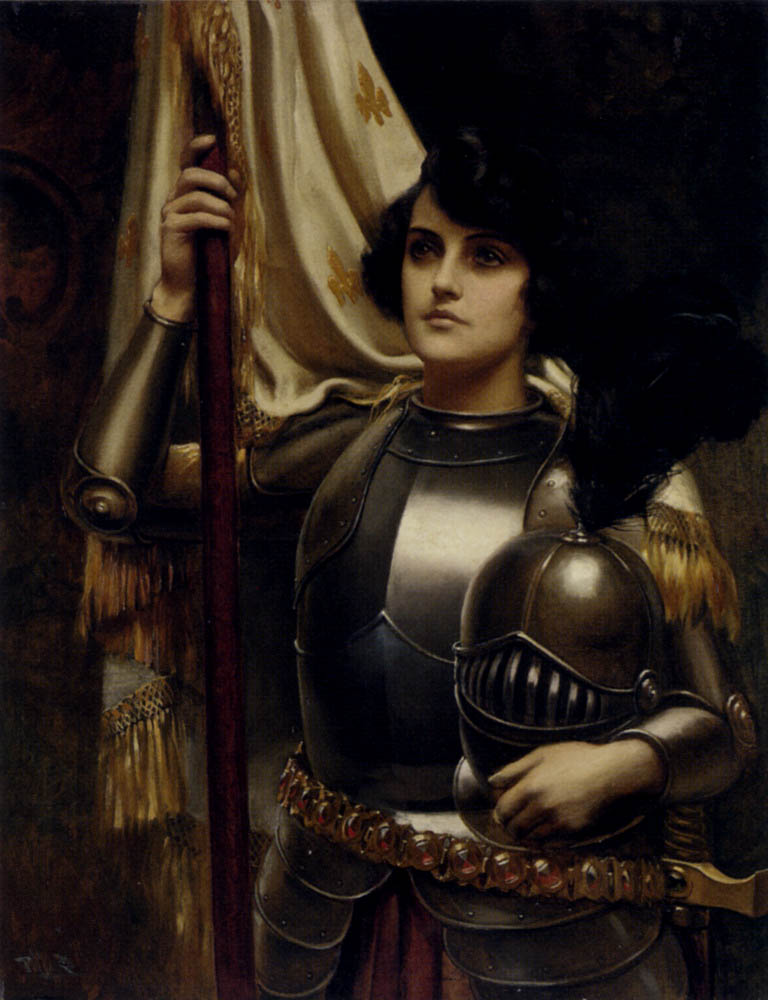
Joan of Arc is considered a medieval Christian heroine of France for her role in the Hundred Years' War, and was canonized as a Roman Catholic saint.

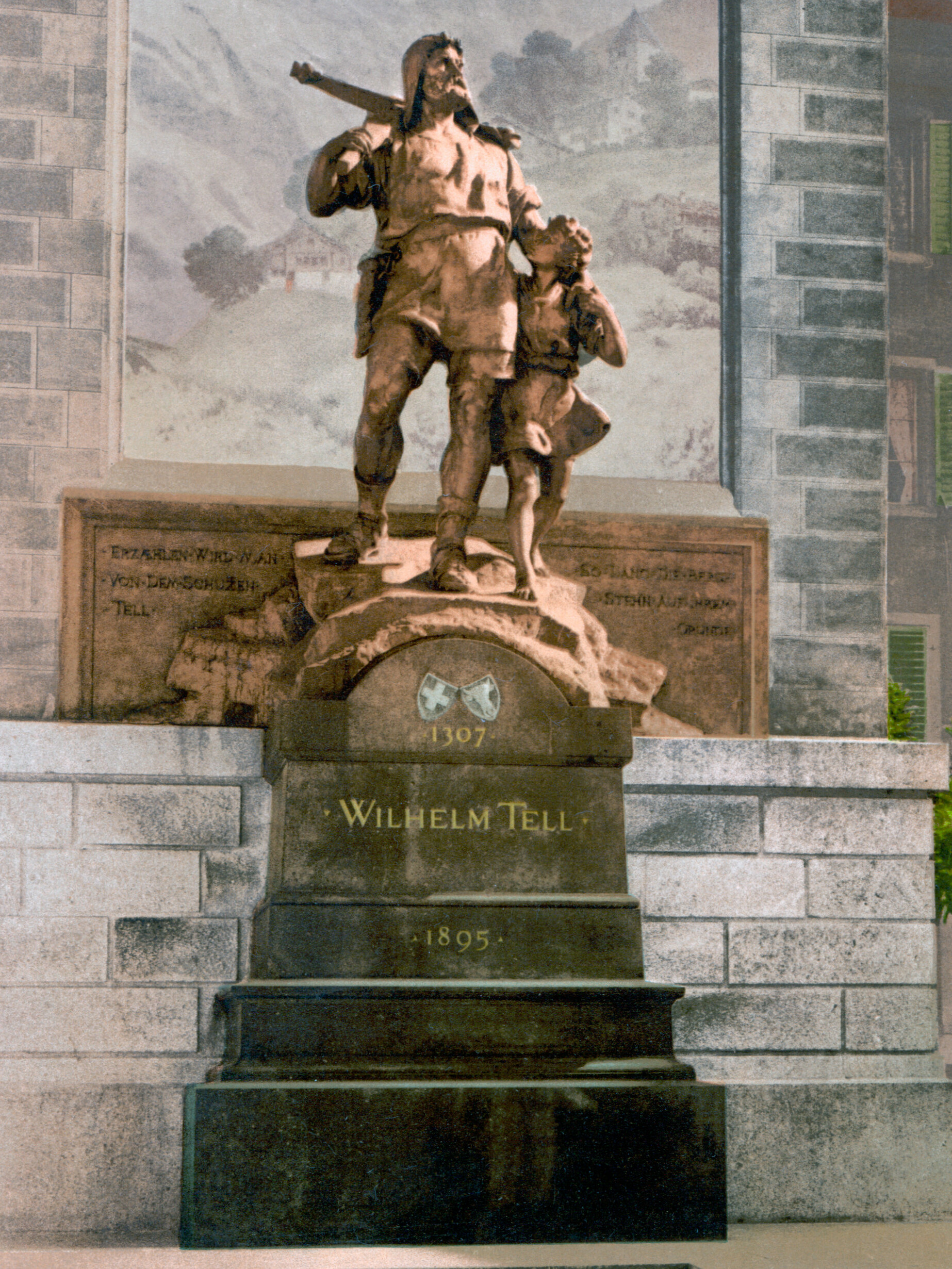
William Tell, a popular folk hero of Switzerland

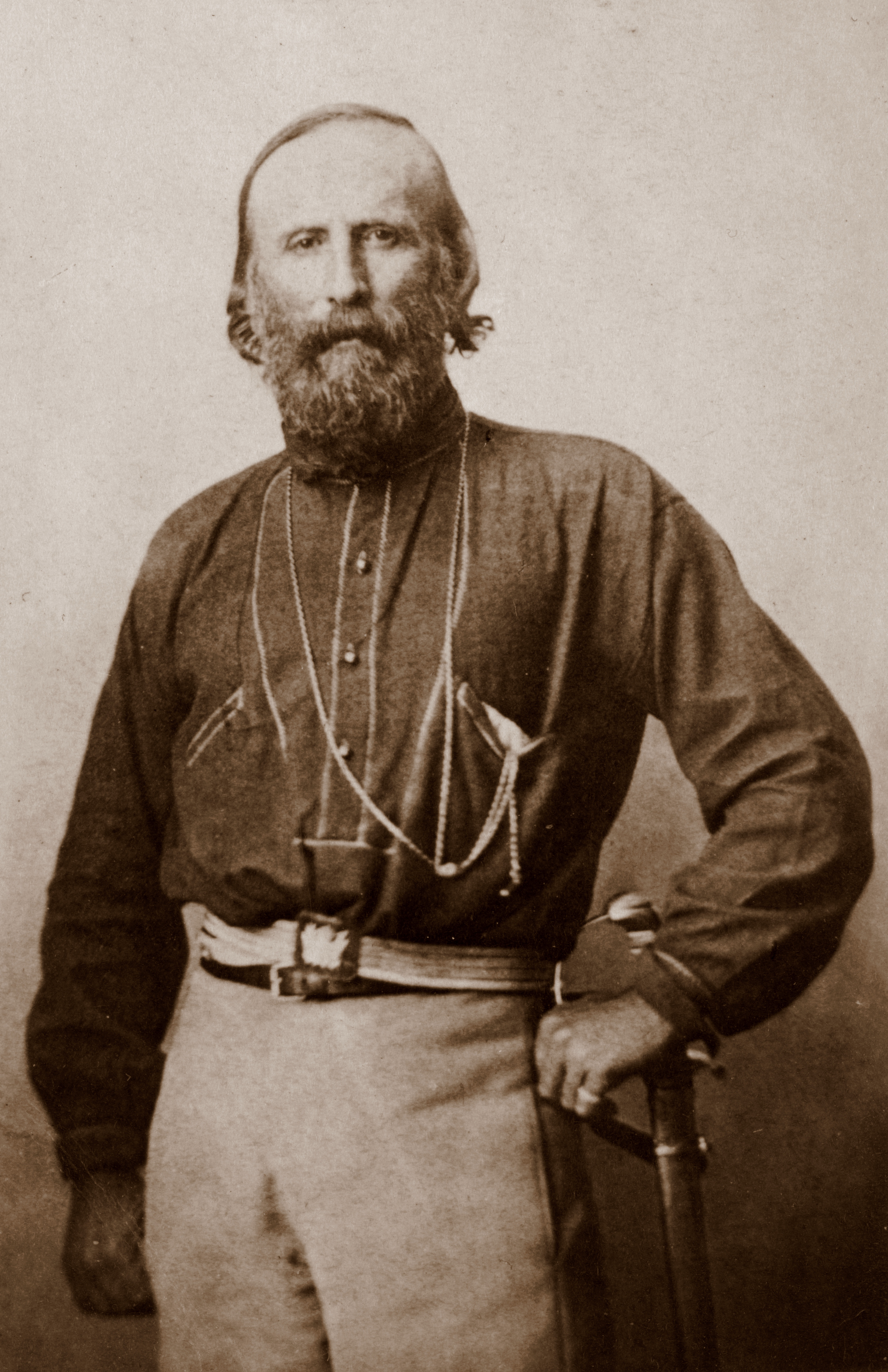
Giuseppe Garibaldi, celebrated as one of the greatest generals of modern times, is considered an Italian national hero for his role in the Italian unification, and is known as the "Hero of the Two Worlds" because of his military enterprises in South America and Europe.

A hero (feminine: heroine) is a real person or fictional character who, in the face of danger, combats adversity through feats of ingenuity, courage, or strength. The original hero type of classical epics did such things for the sake of glory and honor. Post-classical and modern heroes, on the other hand, perform great deeds or selfless acts for the common good instead of the classical goals of wealth, pride, and fame. The antonym of hero is villain. Other terms associated with the concept of hero may include good guy or white hat.

In classical literature, the hero is the main or revered character in heroic epic poetry celebrated through ancient legends of a people, often striving for military conquest and living by a continually flawed personal honor code. The definition of a hero has changed throughout time. Merriam Webster dictionary defines a hero as "a person who is admired for great or brave acts or fine qualities". Examples of heroes range from mythological figures, such as Gilgamesh and Iphigenia, to historical and modern figures, such as Joan of Arc, Giuseppe Garibaldi, Sophie Scholl, Alvin York, Audie Murphy, and Chuck Yeager, and fictional "superheroes", including Superman, Batman, Spider-Man, and Wonder Woman.

== Etymology ==
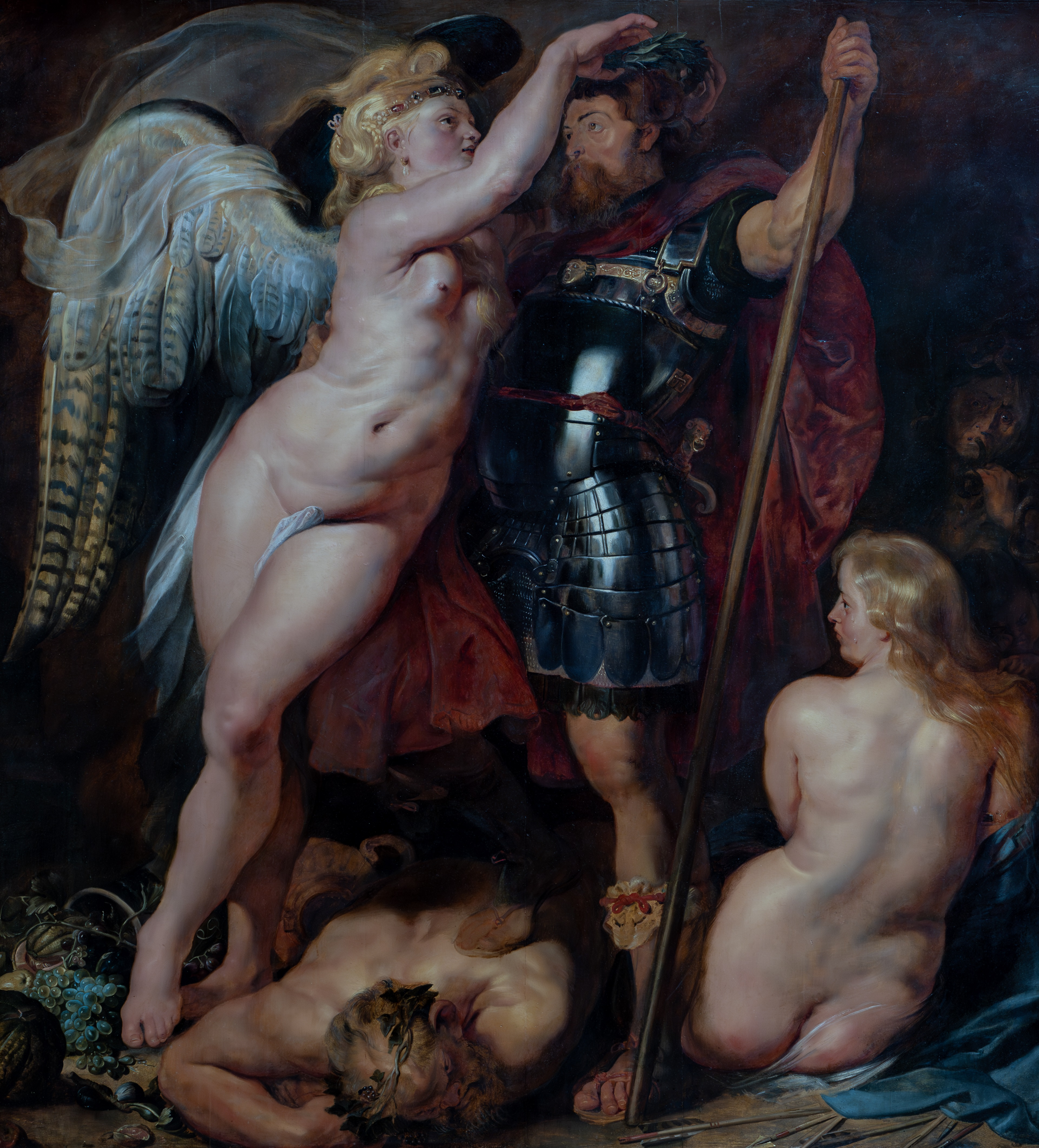
Coronation of the Hero of Virtue by Peter Paul Rubens, c. 1612–1614

The word hero comes from the Greek ἥρως (hērōs), "hero" particularly one such as Heracles with divine ancestry or later given divine honors. Before the decipherment of Linear B the original form of the word was assumed to be *ἥρωϝ-, hērōw-, but the Mycenaean compound ti-ri-se-ro-e demonstrates the absence of -w-.

According to The American Heritage Dictionary of the English Language, the Proto-Indo-European root is *ser meaning "to protect". According to Eric Partridge in Origins, the Greek word hērōs "is akin to" the Latin seruāre, meaning to safeguard. Partridge concludes, "The basic sense of both Hera and hero would therefore be 'protector'." R. S. P. Beekes rejects an Indo-European derivation and asserts that the word has a pre-Greek origin. Hera was a Greek goddess with many attributes, including protection and her worship appears to have similar proto-Indo-European origins.

The female term heroine was taken from the Latin word heroina, from Greek hērōinē, feminine of hērōs. Its first use in the English language, however, was in 1587 to denote of strong and well-abled women of divine origins, as seen in myths and legends.

== Antiquity ==
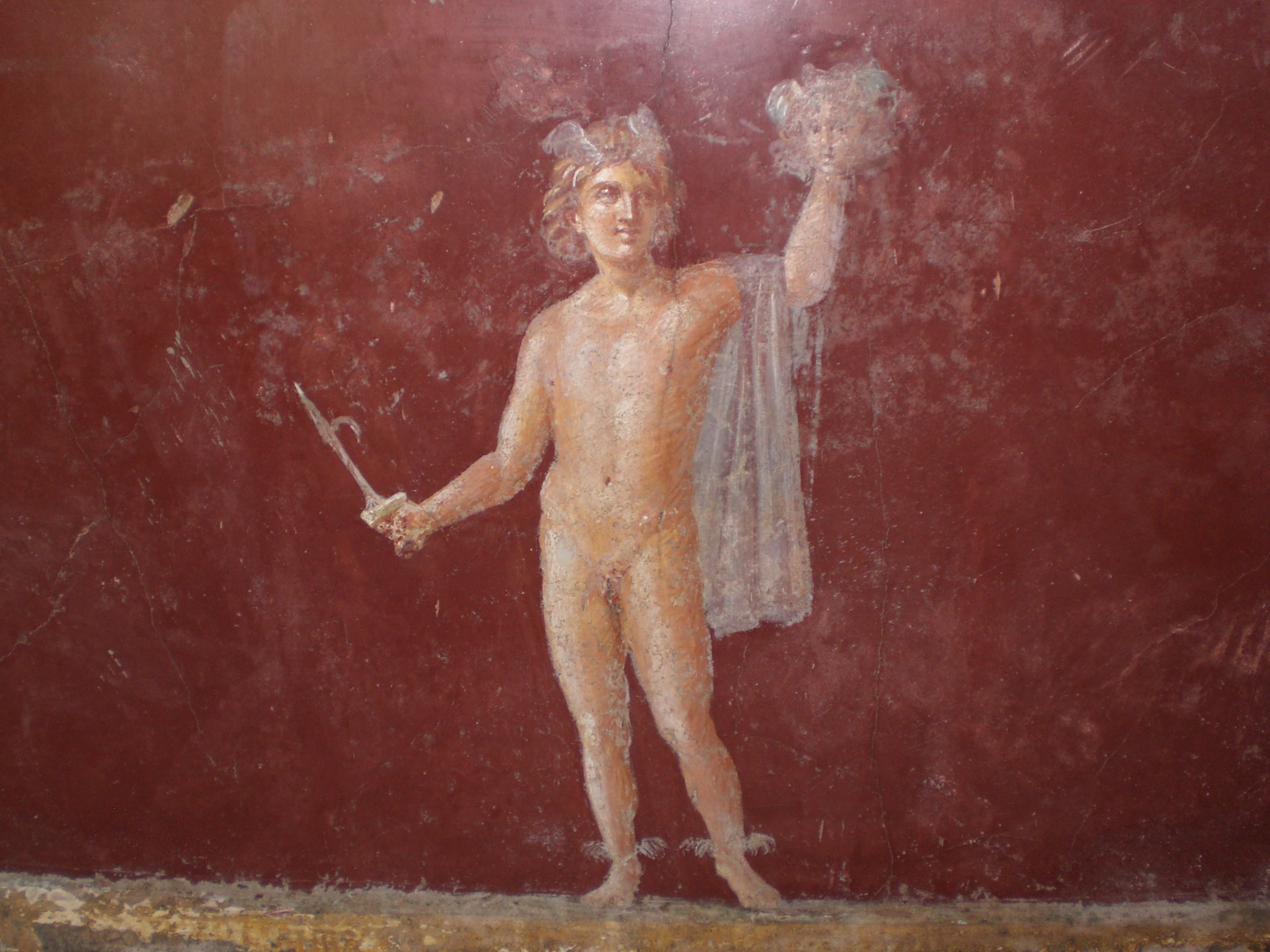
Perseus and the head of Medusa in a Roman fresco at Stabiae

A classical hero is considered to be a "warrior who lives and dies in the pursuit of honor" and asserts their greatness by "the brilliance and efficiency with which they kill". Each classical hero's life focuses on fighting, which occurs in war or during an epic quest. Classical heroes are commonly semi-divine and extraordinarily gifted, such as Achilles, evolving into heroic characters through their perilous circumstances. While these heroes are incredibly resourceful and skilled, they are often foolhardy, court disaster, risk their followers' lives for trivial matters, and behave arrogantly in a childlike manner. During classical times, people regarded heroes with the highest esteem and utmost importance, explaining their prominence within epic literature. The appearance of these mortal figures marks the evolution of audiences and writers turning away from immortal gods to mortal mankind, whose heroic moments of glory survive in the memory of their descendants, extending their legacy.

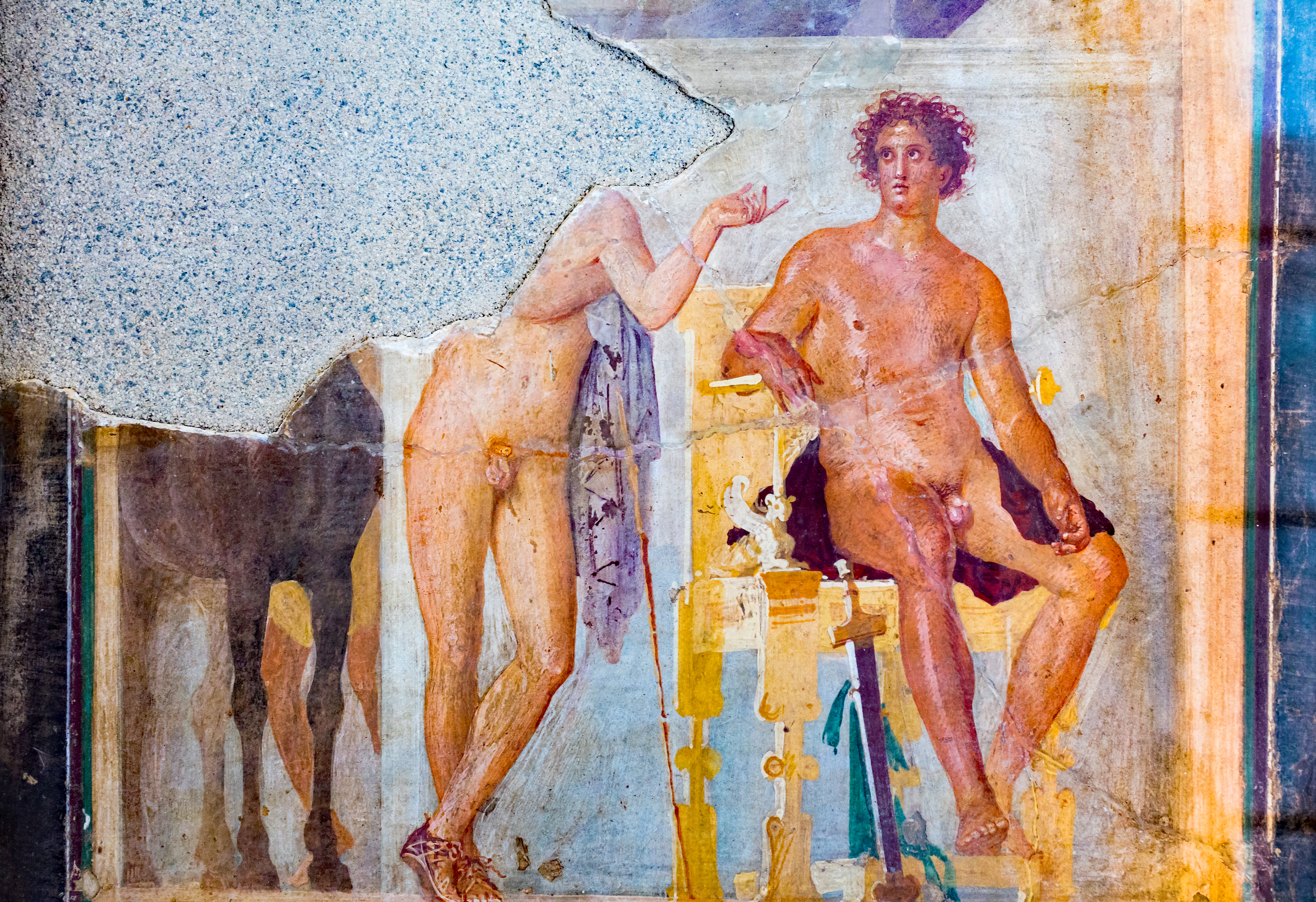
Two heroes. A Roman fresco in Herculaneum, 30-40 AD

Hector was a Trojan prince and the greatest fighter for Troy in the Trojan War, which is known primarily through Homer's Iliad. Hector acted as leader of the Trojans and their allies in the defense of Troy, "killing 31,000 Greek fighters". Hector was known not only for his courage, but also for his noble and courtly nature. Indeed, Homer places Hector as peace-loving, thoughtful, as well as bold, a good son, husband and father, and without darker motives. However, his familial values conflict greatly with his heroic aspirations in the Iliad, as he cannot be both the protector of Troy and a father to his child. Hector is ultimately betrayed by the deities when Athena appears disguised as his ally Deiphobus and convinces him to challenge Achilles, leading to his death at the hands of a superior warrior.

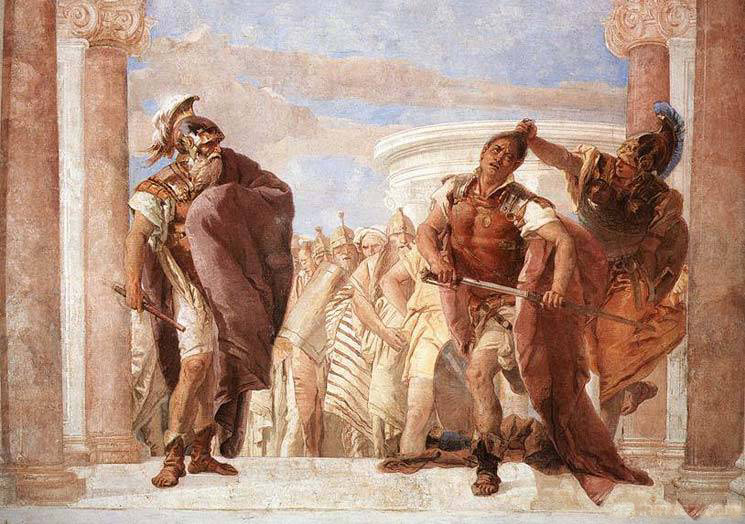
The Rage of Achilles, by Giovanni Battista Tiepolo, 1757

Achilles was a Greek hero who was considered the most formidable military fighter in the entire Trojan War and the central character of the Iliad. He was the child of Thetis and Peleus, making him a demi-god. He wielded superhuman strength on the battlefield and was blessed with a close relationship to the deities. Achilles famously refused to fight after his dishonoring at the hands of Agamemnon, and only returned to the war due to unadulterated rage after Hector killed his beloved companion Patroclus. Achilles was known for uncontrollable rage that defined many of his bloodthirsty actions, such as defiling Hector's corpse by dragging it around the city of Troy seven times. Achilles plays a tragic role in the Iliad brought about because his menis (wrath) repeatedly overpowers his philos (love).

Heroes in myth often had close but conflicted relationships with the deities. Thus, Heracles's name means "the glory of Hera", even though he was tormented all his life by Hera, the Queen of the Greek deities. Perhaps the most striking example is the Athenian king Erechtheus, whom Poseidon killed for choosing Athena rather than him as the city's patron deity. When the Athenians worshiped Erechtheus on the Acropolis, they invoked him as Poseidon Erechtheus.

Fate, or destiny, plays a massive role in the stories of classical heroes. The classical hero's significance stems from battlefield conquests, an inherently dangerous action. The deities in Greek mythology, when interacting with the heroes, often foreshadow the hero's eventual death on the battlefield. Countless heroes and deities go to great lengths to alter their destinies, but with no success, as none, neither human or immortal can change their prescribed outcomes by the three powerful Fates. A characteristic example of this is found in Oedipus Rex. After learning that his son, Oedipus, will end up killing him, the King of Thebes, Laius, takes huge steps to ensure his son's death by removing him from the kingdom. When Oedipus encounters his father when his father was unknown to him in a dispute on the road many years later, Oedipus slays him without a thought. The lack of recognition enabled Oedipus to slay his father, ironically further binding his father to his fate.

Stories of heroism may serve as moral examples. However, classical heroes often did not embody the Christian notion of an upstanding, perfectly moral hero. For example, Achilles's character-issues of hateful rage lead to merciless slaughter and his overwhelming pride lead to him only joining the Trojan War because he did not want his soldiers to win all the glory. Classical heroes, regardless of their morality, were placed in religion. In classical antiquity, cults that venerated deified heroes such as Heracles, Perseus, and Achilles played an important role in Ancient Greek religion. These ancient Greek hero cults worshipped heroes from oral epic tradition, with these heroes often bestowing blessings, especially healing ones, on individuals.

== Myth and monomyth ==
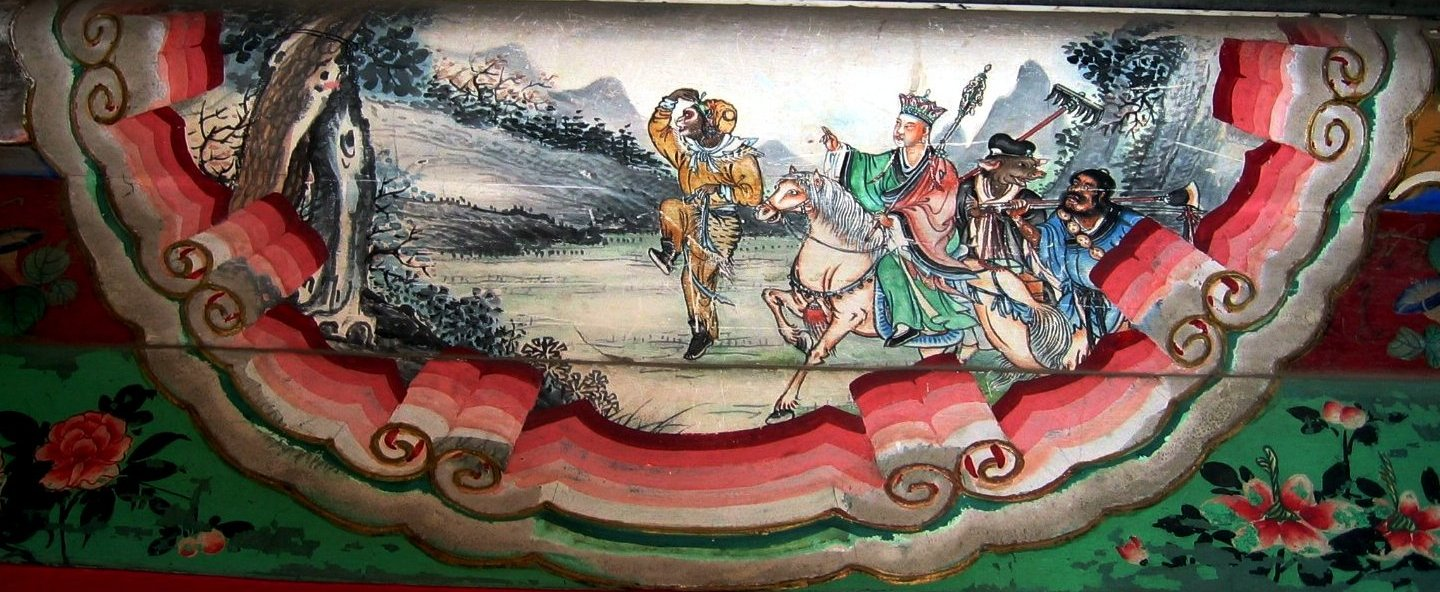
The four heroes from the 16th-century Chinese novel, Journey to the West

The concept of the "Mythic Hero Archetype" was first developed by Lord Raglan in his 1936 book, The Hero, A Study in Tradition, Myth and Drama. It is a set of 22 common traits that he said were shared by many heroes in various cultures, myths, and religions throughout history and worldwide. Raglan argued that the higher the score, the more likely the figure is mythical.

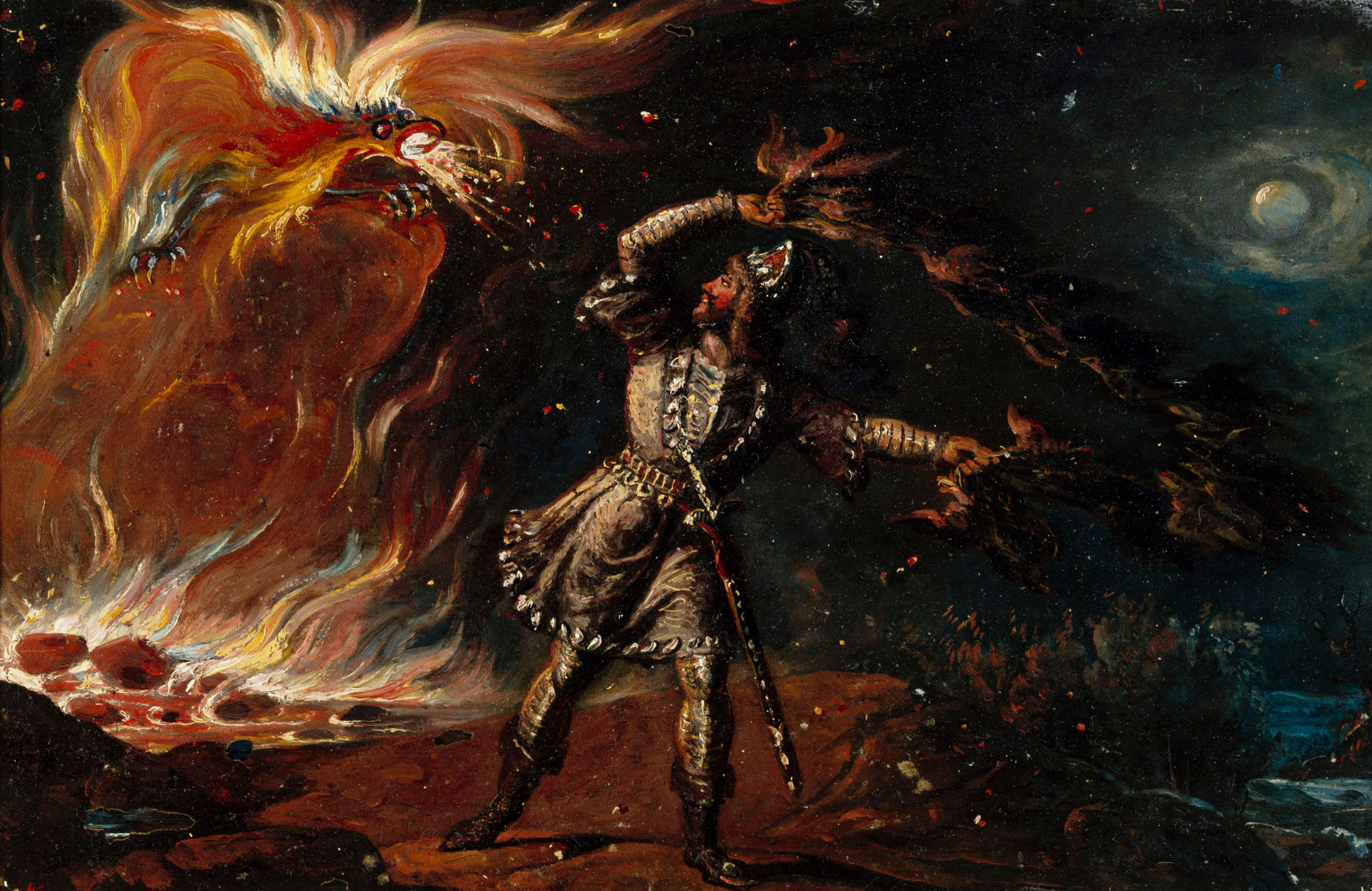
Lemminkäinen and the Fiery Eagle, Robert Wilhelm Ekman, 1867

The concept of a story archetype of the standard monomythical "hero's quest" that was reputed to be pervasive across all cultures is somewhat controversial. Expounded mainly by Joseph Campbell in his 1949 work The Hero with a Thousand Faces, it illustrates several uniting themes of hero stories that hold similar ideas of what a hero represents despite vastly different cultures and beliefs. The monomyth or Hero's Journey consists of three separate stages: the Departure, Initiation, and Return. Within these stages, there are several archetypes that the hero of either gender may follow, including the call to adventure (which they may initially refuse), supernatural aid, proceeding down a road of trials, achieving a realization about themselves (or an apotheosis), and attaining the freedom to live through their quest or journey. Campbell offered examples of stories with similar themes, such as Krishna, Buddha, Apollonius of Tyana, and Jesus. One of the themes he explores is the androgynous hero, who combines male and female traits, such as Bodhisattva: "The first wonder to be noted here is the androgynous character of the Bodhisattva: masculine Avalokiteshvara, feminine Kwan Yin." In his 1968 book, The Masks of God: Occidental Mythology, Campbell writes, "It is clear that, whether accurate or not as to biographical detail, the moving legend of the Crucified and Risen Christ was fit to bring a new warmth, immediacy, and humanity, to the old motifs of the beloved Tammuz, Adonis, and Osiris cycles."

== Slavic fairy tales ==
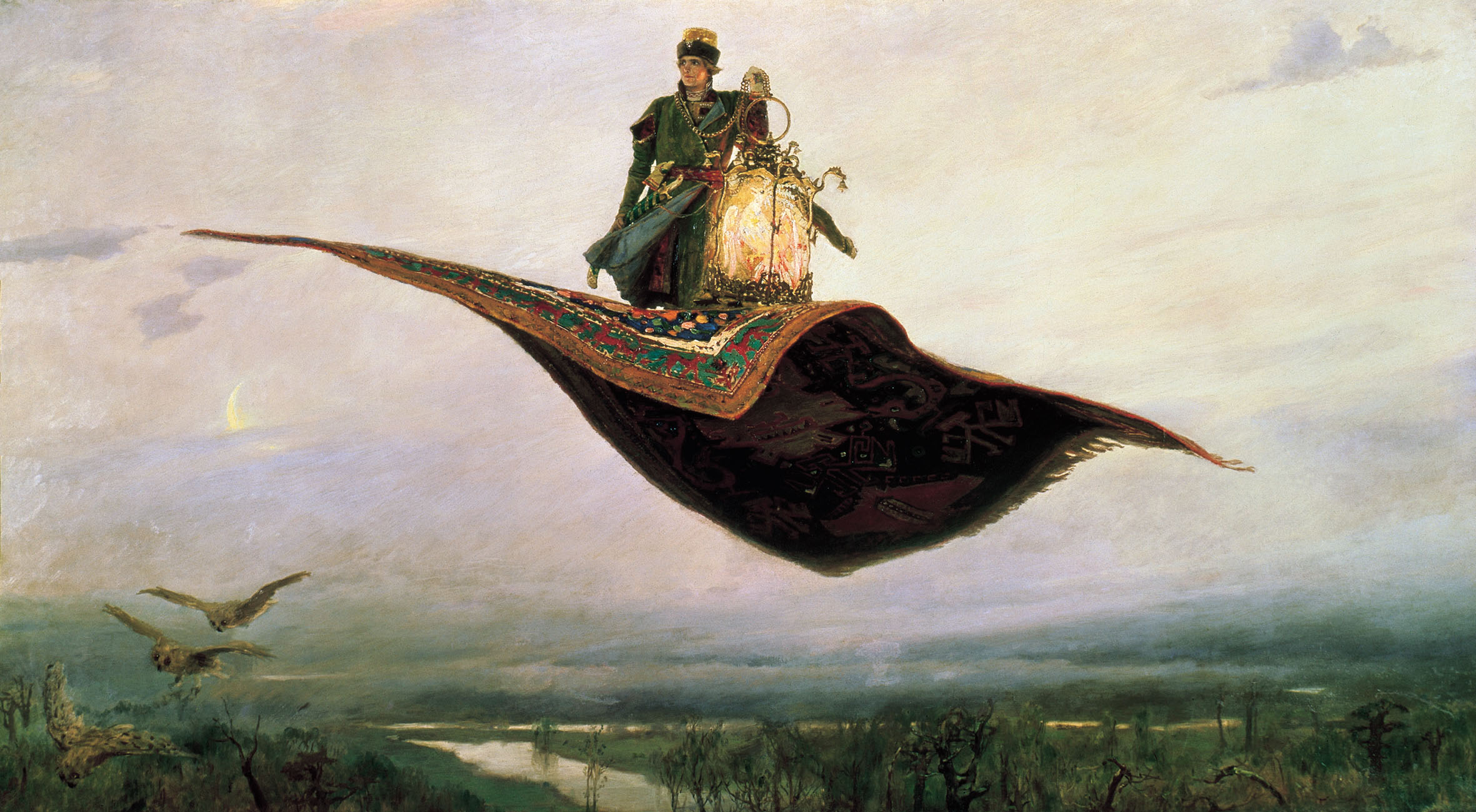
Ivan Tsarevich, a hero of Russian folklore by Viktor Vasnetsov (1880)

Vladimir Propp, in his analysis of Russian fairy tales, concluded that a fairy tale had only eight dramatis personæ, of which one was the hero, and his analysis has been widely applied to non-Russian folklore. The actions that fall into such a hero's sphere include:

1. Departure on a quest
2. Reacting to the test of a donor
3. Marrying a princess (or similar figure)

Propp distinguished between seekers and victim-heroes. A villain could initiate the issue by kidnapping the hero or driving him out; these were victim-heroes. On the other hand, an antagonist could rob the hero, or kidnap someone close to him, or, without the villain's intervention, the hero could realize that he lacked something and set out to find it; these heroes are seekers. Victims may appear in tales with seeker heroes, but the tale does not follow them both.

== Historical studies ==
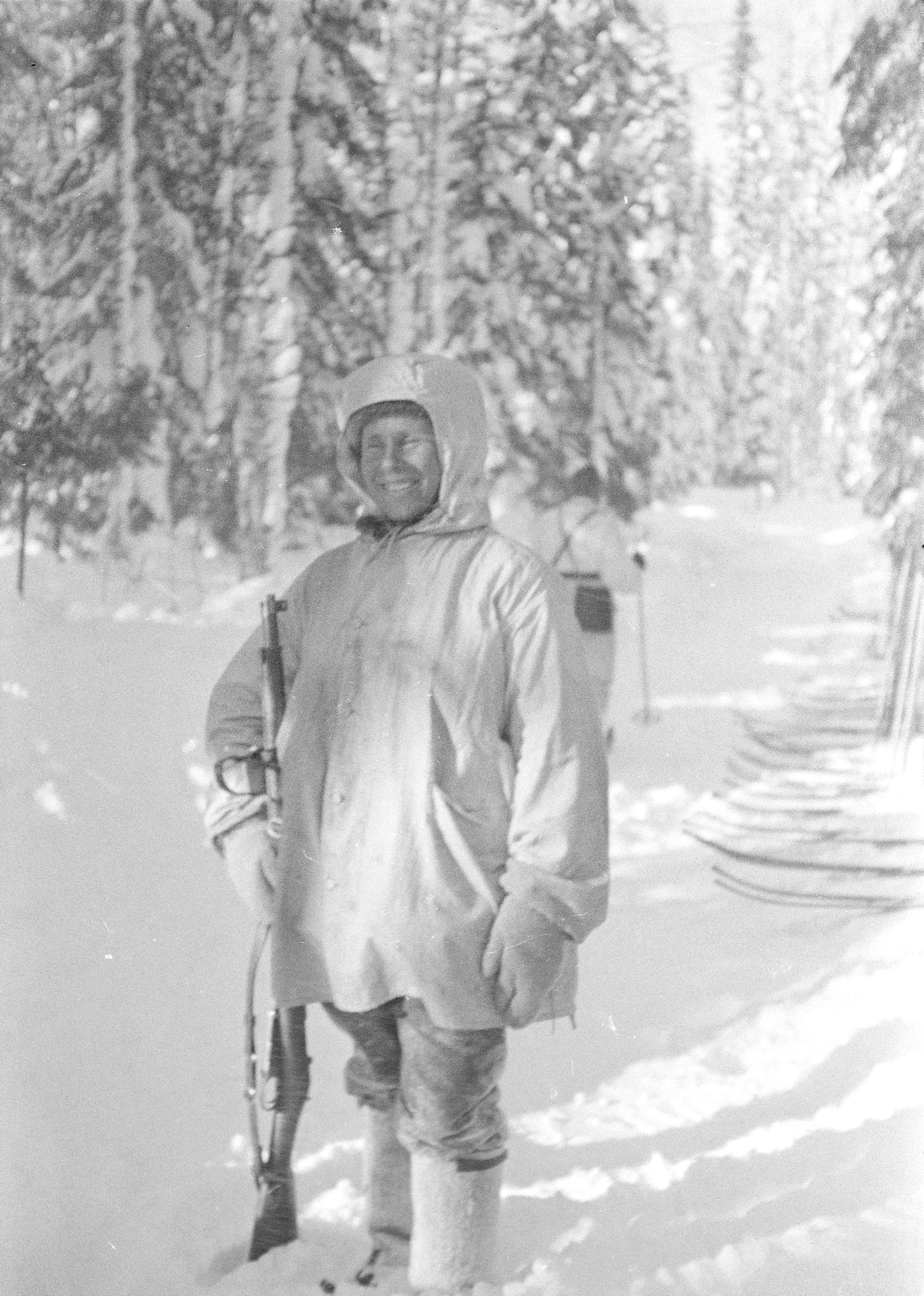
Simo Häyhä, a Finnish military sniper during the Winter War, achieved the reputation of a pioneering war hero, despite his modest nature.

The 18th century Enlightenment attempted, both through intellectual critique and newly developing bourgeois institutions, a "taming of heroism", if not its undoing. Yet the first half of the 19th century saw a return to hero worship. The philosopher Hegel gave a central role to the "hero", personalized by Napoleon, as the incarnation of a particular culture's Volksgeist and thus of the general Zeitgeist. Thomas Carlyle's 1841 work, On Heroes, Hero-Worship, & the Heroic in History, also accorded an essential function to heroes and great men in history. Carlyle centered history on the biographies of individuals, as in Oliver Cromwell's Letters and Speeches and History of Frederick the Great. His heroes were not only political and military figures, the founders or topplers of states, but also religious figures, poets, authors, and captains of industry.

Explicit defenses of Carlyle's position became rarer in the second half of the 19th century. Most authors in the philosophy of history school contended that the motive forces in history may best be described only with a wider lens than the one that Carlyle used for his portraits. For example, Karl Marx argued that history was determined by the massive social forces at play in "class struggles", not by the individuals by whom these forces are played out. After Marx, Herbert Spencer wrote at the end of the 19th century: "You must admit that the genesis of the great man depends on the long series of complex influences which has produced the race in which he appears, and the social state into which that race has slowly grown...[b]efore he can remake his society, his society must make him." Such doubts continued during the 20th century, particularly in France. The Annales school, led by Lucien Febvre, Marc Bloch, and Fernand Braudel, would contest the exaggeration of the role of individual subjects in history. Indeed, Braudel distinguished various time scales, one accorded to the life of an individual, another accorded to the life of a few human generations, and the last one to civilizations, in which geography, economics, and demography play a role considerably more decisive than that of individual subjects. Michel Foucault argued in his analysis of societal communication and debate that history was mainly the "science of the sovereign", until its inversion by the "historical and political popular discourse".

Among noticeable events in the studies of the role of the hero and great man in history, one should mention Sidney Hook's book (1943) The Hero in History. In the second half of the twentieth century such male-focused theory has been contested, among others by feminists writers such as Judith Fetterley in The Resisting Reader (1977) and literary theorist Nancy K. Miller, The Heroine's Text: Readings in the French and English Novel, 1722–1782.

Modern examples of heroic leaders associated with transformative change have included Martin Luther King Jr, Nelson Mandela, Mahatma Gandhi and Albert Einstein. Other individuals considered to be historical heroes include Anne Frank, Harriet Tubman and Raoul Wallenberg.

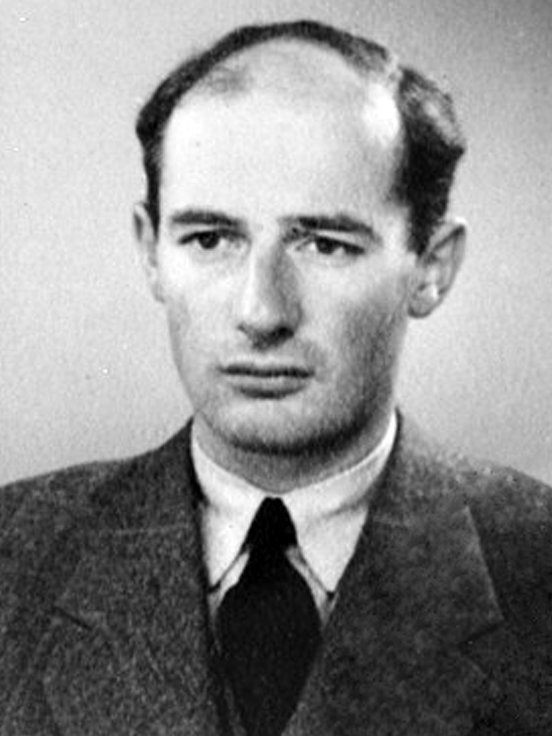
The Swedish Diplomat Raoul Wallenberg saved the lives of tens of thousands of Jews in Budapest during World War II.

In the era of globalization an individual may change the development of a country and of the whole world, so this has given reason to some scholars to suggest a return to the problem of the hero's role in history from the viewpoint of modern historical knowledge and using up-to-date methods of historical analysis.

Within the frameworks of developing counterfactual history, attempts are made to examine some hypothetical scenarios of historical development. The hero attracts much attention because most of those scenarios are based on the suppositions: what would have happened if this or that historical individual had or had not been alive.

== Modern fiction ==
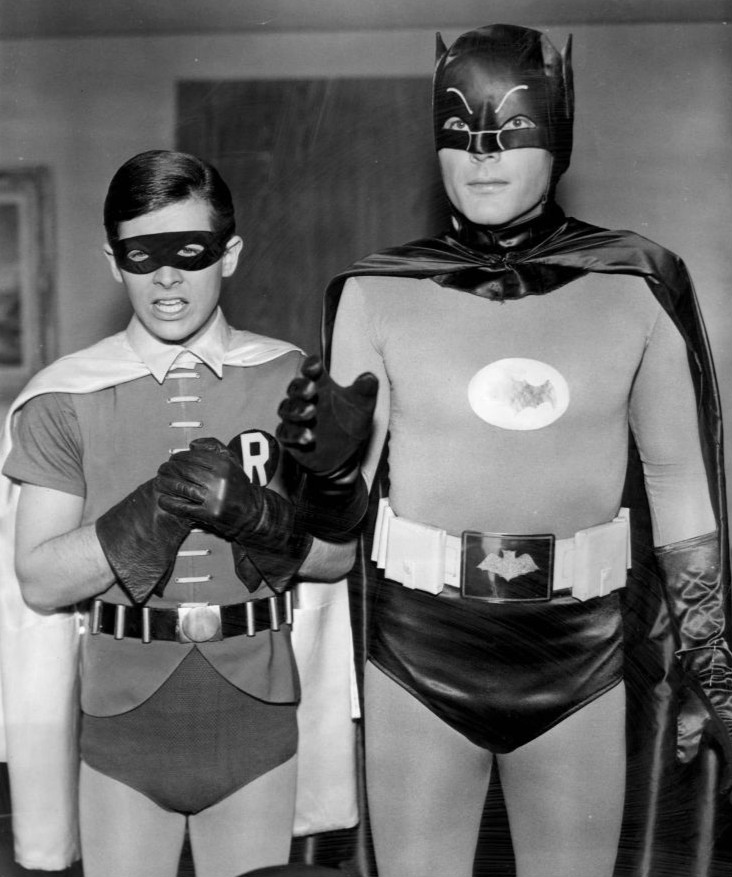
Batman (Adam West) and Robin (Burt Ward) in the 1966–1968 television series, Batman

The word "hero" is sometimes used to describe the protagonist or the romantic interest of a story, a usage which may conflict with the superhuman expectations of heroism. A good example is Anna Karenina, the lead character in the novel of the same title by Leo Tolstoy. In modern literature the hero is more and more a problematic concept. In 1848, for example, William Makepeace Thackeray gave Vanity Fair the subtitle, A Novel without a Hero, and imagined a world in which no sympathetic character was to be found. Vanity Fair is a satirical representation of the absence of truly moral heroes in the modern world. The story focuses on the characters, Emmy Sedley and Becky Sharpe (the latter as the clearly defined anti-hero), with the plot focused on the eventual marriage of these two characters to rich men, revealing character flaws as the story progresses. Even the most sympathetic characters, such as Captain Dobbin, are susceptible to weakness, as he is often narcissistic and melancholic.

The larger-than-life hero is a more common feature of fantasy (particularly in comic books and epic fantasy) than more realist works. However, these larger-than life figures remain prevalent in society. The superhero genre is a multibillion-dollar industry that includes comic books, movies, toys, and video games. Superheroes usually possess extraordinary talents and powers that no living human could ever possess. The superhero stories often pit a super villain against the hero, with the hero fighting the crime caused by the super villain. Examples of long-running superheroes include Superman, Wonder Woman, Batman, and Spider-Man.

Research indicates that male writers are more likely to make heroines superhuman, whereas female writers tend to make heroines ordinary humans, as well as making their male heroes more powerful than their heroines, possibly due to sex differences in valued traits.

== Psychology ==
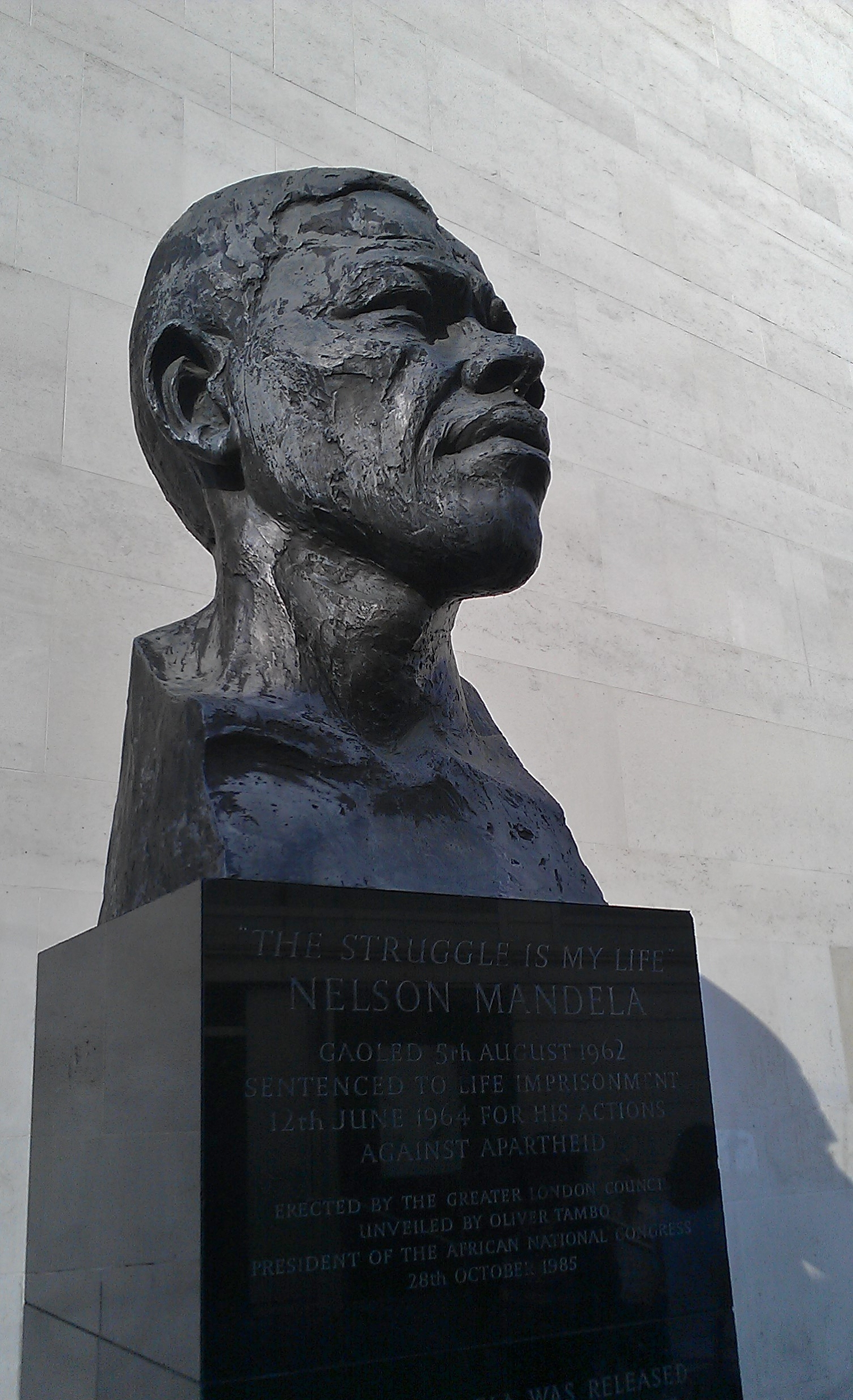
Bust of Nelson Mandela erected on London's South Bank. Mandela is widely considered a global hero for his role in opposing the apartheid system and inaugurating a multiracial democracy.

Social psychology has begun paying attention to heroes and heroism. Zeno Franco and Philip Zimbardo point out differences between heroism and altruism, and they offer evidence that observer perceptions of unjustified risk play a role above and beyond risk type in determining the ascription of heroic status.

Psychologists have also identified the traits of heroes. Elaine Kinsella and her colleagues have identified 12 central traits of heroism, which consist of bravery, moral integrity, conviction, courage, self-sacrifice, protecting, honesty, selflessness, determination, saving others, inspiring others, and helpfulness. Scott Allison and George Goethals uncovered evidence for "the great eight traits" of heroes consisting of wisdom, strength, resilience, reliability, charisma, caring, selflessness, and inspiring others. These researchers have also identified four primary functions of heroism. Heroes give us wisdom; they enhance us; they provide moral modeling; and they offer protection.

An evolutionary psychology explanation for heroic risk-taking is that it is a costly signal demonstrating the ability of the hero. It may be seen as one form of altruism for which there are several other evolutionary explanations as well.

Roma Chatterji has suggested that the hero or more generally protagonist is first and foremost a symbolic representation of the person who is experiencing the story while reading, listening, or watching; thus the relevance of the hero to the individual relies a great deal on how much similarity there is between them and the character. Chatterji suggested that one reason for the hero-as-self interpretation of stories and myths is the human inability to view the world from any perspective but a personal one.

In the Pulitzer Prize-winning book, The Denial of Death, Ernest Becker argues that human civilization is ultimately an elaborate, symbolic defense mechanism against the knowledge of our mortality, which in turn acts as the emotional and intellectual response to our basic survival mechanism. Becker explains that a basic duality in human life exists between the physical world of objects and a symbolic world of human meaning. Thus, since humanity has a dualistic nature consisting of a physical self and a symbolic self, he asserts that humans are able to transcend the dilemma of mortality through heroism, by focusing attention mainly on the symbolic self. This symbolic self-focus takes the form of an individual's "immortality project" (or "causa sui project"), which is essentially a symbolic belief-system that ensures that one is believed superior to physical reality. By successfully living under the terms of the immortality project, people feel they can become heroic and, henceforth, part of something eternal; something that will never die as compared to their physical body. This he asserts, in turn, gives people the feeling that their lives have meaning, a purpose, and are significant in the grand scheme of things. Another theme running throughout the book is his belief that humanity's traditional "hero-systems", such as religion, are no longer convincing in an age of reason. Science attempts to serve as an immortality project, something that Becker believes it can never do, because it is unable to provide agreeable, absolute meanings to human life. The book states that we need new convincing "illusions" that enable people to feel heroic in ways that are agreeable. Becker hopes that gradual realization of humanity's innate motivations, namely death, may help to bring about a better world. Terror Management Theory (TMT) has generated evidence supporting this perspective.

== Mental and physical integration ==
Examining the success of resistance fighters on Crete during the Nazi occupation in WWII, author and endurance researcher C. McDougall drew connections to the Ancient Greek heroes and a culture of integrated physical self-mastery, training, and mental conditioning. Skills established an "ability to unleash tremendous resources of strength, endurance, and agility that many people don't realize they already have." McDougall cites examples of heroic acts, including a scholium to Pindar's Fifth Nemean Ode: "Much weaker in strength than the Minotaur, Theseus fought with it and won using pankration, as he had no knife." Pankration, a martial art that featured in the ancient Olympic Games, means "total power and knowledge", one "associated with gods and heroes ... who conquer by tapping every talent".

== See also ==
- Action hero
- Antihero
- Byronic hero
- Carnegie Hero Fund
- Culture hero
- Face (professional wrestling)
- Folk hero
- Germanic hero
- Hero of Socialist Labour
- Heroic fantasy
- List of female action heroes and villains
- Randian hero
- Reluctant hero
- Romantic hero
- Soter
- Tragic hero
- Youxia
