= Unit for Criticism and Interpretive Theory =

US research unit

The Unit for Criticism and Interpretive Theory is an interdisciplinary program developed within the Graduate College and the College of Liberal Arts and Sciences at the University of Illinois at Urbana-Champaign. It works to promote conversations among a range of departments in the humanities, social sciences, and performing arts by organizing lectures, panel discussions, and conferences, as well as a yearly series of lectures on Modern Critical Theory. The unit is one of several dozen centers around the world devoted to critical theory, and was one of the first to be formally established (circa 1981).

In The Employment of English: Theory, Jobs, and the Future of Literary Studies, literary scholar Michael Berube writes that "[b]y formally bringing together, through zero-time appointments, faculty members from disciplines engaged in some degree by theorized recursivity," the Unit for Criticism "has helped produce dialogue spoken in a kind of esperanto based in shared hermeneutic practices," performing an important interdisciplinary function within the university. Although some criticized the books for being excessively theoretical and for what Terry Eagleton, in a review of Cultural Studies, called the “anything-goes-ism” of cultural studies, they provoked discussion about the nature of interdisciplinary work in the humanities and social sciences. Hayden White called Marxism and the Interpretation of Culture a "major event in the discourse of cultural criticism of our time," Timothy Brennan noted that Marxism was “already featured on the reading lists of cultural studies seminars across the country,” and Kristine L. Fitch wrote of Cultural Studies that “As an inquisitive stance from which to conduct research into a complex world of human beings and human problems, the book has a great deal to offer even when one does not entirely buy (as I do not) what cultural studies scholars do or how they do it.” Through its large international conferences and their resultant books (Marxism and Cultural Studies) as well as through its smaller and more mundane activities (faculty development seminars and local colloquia; partial funding of graduate students) the unit has helped foster theoretical inquiry and cultural studies in Urbana and beyond. It has thus played a small but significant part in the transformation of the humanities and qualitative social sciences in the past several decades in the USA.

From 1981 to 1983 the unit was directed by Cary Nelson. From 1984 to 2003 the unit was directed by Peter K. Garrett [1]. From 2003 to 2009, the unit was directed by Michael Rothberg, professor of English [2], followed by Lauren M. E. Goodlad,[4] who served as interim director and then director until 2014. She was followed by Susan Koshy, 2014-2022, followed by the current director, D. Fairchild Ruggles who has served since 2022.

== Conferences ==
- Marxism and the Interpretation of Culture (1983)
- Cultural Studies Now and in the Future (1990)
- Higher Education Under Fire: Politics, Economics, and the Crisis of the Humanities (1993)
- Postcolonial Studies and Beyond (2002)
- Mad World: Sex, Politics, Style and the 1960s (2010)
- Theorizing Premodern Alterity and Racial Rhetorics (2024)
- Protest in the Post-Political Era (2025)
