= Peggy Kamuf =

Peggy Kamuf (born 1947) is the Marion Frances Chevalier Professor of French and Comparative Literature at the University of Southern California. She is one of the primary English translators of the works of Jacques Derrida. She received the American Comparative Literature Association's 2006 René Wellek Prize for her 2005 work Book of Addresses.

Professor Kamuf has also been awarded The Essential Humanities (Andrew W. Mellon Foundation) grant as well as a National Endowment for the Humanities Grant for the translation of the seminars of Jacques Derrida, working in collaboration with Geoffrey Bennington, Pascale-Anne Brault, Michael Naas, Elizabeth Rottenberg, and David Wills.

== Reception ==
=== Women's writing ===
The Eighties saw Kamuf in a (decade-spanning) debate with Nancy K. Miller about the significance of women's writing, Kamuf arguing that proponents of gynocriticism were merely re-iterating a liberal humanism long since deconstructed by the likes of Derrida.

== Bibliography ==
=== Books ===
==== Self-Authored ====
- Kamuf, Peggy (2018). Literature and the Remains of the Death Penalty. Fordham University Press.
- Kamuf, Peggy (2010). To Follow: The Wake of Jacques Derrida. Edinburgh: Edinburgh University Press.
- Kamuf, Peggy (2005). Book of Addresses. Stanford University Press.
  - Adreßbuch. Translated by Rike Felka. Brinkmann und Bose. Berlin 2009. ISBN 978-3-940048-05-9.
- Kamuf, Peggy (1997). The Division of Literature, or the University in Deconstruction. University of Chicago Press.
- Kamuf, Peggy (1993). On the work of Jean-Luc Nancy. Edingburgh University Press.
- Kamuf, Peggy (1991). A Derrida Reader: Between the Blinds.
- Kamuf, Peggy (1988). Signature Pieces: On the Institution of Authorship. Cornell University Press.
- Kamuf, Peggy (1982). Fictions of Feminine Desire: Disclosures of Heloise. University of Nebraska Pres.

==== Translations ====
- Derrida, Jacques. (2013). The Death Penalty Volume I. Chicago, IL: The University of Chicago Press.
- Cixous, Hélène. (2009). So Close. London: Polity Press.
- Derrida, J., Kamuf (ed.), P., Rottenberb (ed.), E. (2008). Psyche: Inventions of the Other, Vol. 2. 333. Stanford, CA: Stanford UP.
- Derrida, J., Kamuf, P., Rottenberg (ed.), E. (2007). Psyche: Inventions of the Other, Vol. 1. Stanford, CA: Stanford UP.
- Derrida, J., Kamuf, P. (2002). Without Alibi. Stanford, CA: Jacques Derrida, Without Alibi (ed. P. Kamuf)/Stanford University Press.

=== Book chapters ===
- Kamuf, P. (2008). "The Affect of America" in Derrida's Legacies: Literature and Philosophy. pp. 138–50. Routledge.
- Kamuf, P. (2007). "Aller à la ligne".
- Kamuf, P. (2005). "'J' Is for Just a Minute: It's Miller Time When It Shimmers,". pp. 197–209. New York: Provocations to Reading:J. Hillis Miller and the Democracy To Come/Fordham University Press.
- Kamuf, P. (2004). "Venir aux débuts". pp. 329–334. Paris, France: Cahier de l'Herne: Jacques Derrida/Cahier de l'Herne.
- Kamuf, P. (2004). "Signé Paine, ou la panique dans les lettres". pp. 19–35. Paris, France: La Démocratie à venir: Autour de Jacques Derrida/Editions Galilée.
- Kamuf, P., Wolfreys, J. (2004). "Symptoms of Response: An Interview with Peggy Kamuf". pp. 20–32. Thinking Difference: Critics in Conversation, Fordham University Press.

=== Essays ===
- Kamuf, P. `. (2010). "The Dawn of the Seminar". pp. 10. http://www.derridaseminars.org/index.html

=== Selected Journal Articles ===
- Kamuf, P. (2013). "The Time of Marx: Derrida's Perestroika". The Los Angeles Review of Books. Time of Marx
- Kamuf, P. (2012). "Protocol: Death Penalty Addiction". The Southern Journal of Philosophy. Vol. 50, pp. 5–19.
- Kamuf, P. (2012). "Life in Storage: Of Capitalism and A&E's 'Storage Wars'". The Los Angeles Review of Books. Life in Storage
- Kamuf, P. (2009). "The Names of War". Oxford Literary Review. Vol. 31 (2), pp. 231–48.
- Kamuf, P., McCance, D. (2009). "Crossings: An Interview with Peggy Kamuf". Mosaic. Vol. 42 (4), pp. 1–17.
- Kamuf, P. (2009). "The Ear Who?". Discourse. Vol. 30 (1-2), pp. 177–90.
- Kamuf, P. (2009). "Signed Paine, or Panic in Literature". Diacritics. Vol. 38 (1-2), pp. 30–43.
- Kamuf, P. (2009). "Bowing to Necessity in the Idiom of Rodolphe Gasché". New Centennial Review. Vol. 8 (3), pp. 85–105.
- Kamuf, P. (2007). "To Do Justice to 'Rousseau,' Irreducibly". Eighteenth-Century Studies. Vol. 40 (3), pp. 395–404.
- Kamuf, P. (2007). "Accounterability". Textual Practice. Vol. 21 (2), pp. 251–66.
- Kamuf, P. (2007). "Deconstruction". Year's Work in Critical and Cultural Theory. Vol. 15, pp. 1–20.
- Kamuf, P. (2006). "Afterburn: An Afterword to 'The Flying Manuscript,'". New Literary History. Vol. 37 (1), pp. 47–55.
- Kamuf, P. (2006). "From Now On,". Epoché. Vol. 10 (2), pp. 203–20..
- Kamuf, P. (2006). "Deconstruction,". Year's Work in Critical and Cultural Theory. Vol. 14, pp. 1–18..
- Kamuf, P. (2006). "Composition Displacement". MLN. Vol. 121, pp. 872–92.
- Kamuf, P. (2005). "To Follow". Differences: A Journal of Feminist Cultural Studies. Vol. 16, pp. 3 (Fall 2005).
- Kamuf, P. (2004). "Peace Keeping the Other War". Revue de Littérature Comparée. Vol. 312 (Oct.-Dec. 2004), pp. 445–65.
- Kamuf, P. (2004). "L'autre différence sexuelle". Europe: Revue littéraire mensuelle. Vol. May 2004, pp. 163–90.
- Kamuf, P. (2004). "Traduire dans l'urgence". Le Magazine littéraire. Vol. 430 (April 2004), p. 49.
- Kamuf, P. (2004). "The University in the World It Is Attempting To Think". Culture Machine (Web Journal). Vol. 6 (2004)
