= Michael Bérubé =

American academic (born 1961)

- Born: 1961 (age 64–65); New York City, New York, U.S.

Academic background
- Education: Columbia University (BA); University of Virginia (PhD)

Academic work
- Discipline: Cultural studies
- Institutions: Pennsylvania State University

Michael Bérubé (born 1961) is an Edwin Erle Sparks Professor of Literature at Pennsylvania State University, where he teaches American literature, disability studies, and cultural studies. He is the author of several books on cultural studies, disability rights, liberal and conservative politics, and debates in higher education. From 2010 to 2017, he was the director of the Institute for the Arts and Humanities at Penn State; from 1997 to 2001 he was the founding director of the Illinois Program for Research in the Humanities. He was the 2012 president of the Modern Language Association, and served as vice president from 2010 to 2011. He served two terms on the National Council of the American Association of University Professors from 2005 to 2011, and three terms on the AAUP's Committee A on Academic Freedom and Tenure from 2009 to 2018. He was a member of the International Advisory Board of the Consortium of Humanities Centers and Institutes for two terms, 2011–2017. Bérubé was named a University Scholar for research at the University of Illinois in 1995 and was awarded the Faculty Scholar medal for research from Penn State in 2012.

== Life, education and career ==
The son of Maurice Berube (Eminent Scholar Emeritus and Professor Emeritus of Educational Leadership at Old Dominion University until his death in 2026), Bérubé was born in 1961 in New York City, and attended Regis High School. He received a B.A. in English from Columbia University in 1982 and a Ph.D. in English from the University of Virginia, where he studied from 1983 to 1989. Bérubé held a professorship in the English department at the University of Illinois at Urbana–Champaign from 1989 to 2001, where he was affiliated with the Unit for Criticism and Interpretive Theory and the Afro-American Studies and Research Program. In 2001, Bérubé moved to Penn State for the then-newly created Paterno Family Professorship in Literature, from which he resigned in the wake of the Penn State child sex abuse scandal.

From 1996 to 2016, Bérubé edited "Cultural Front", the New York University Press series which published his 2009 book The Left at War and his 1998 book The Employment of English, as well as fifteen other titles, many in disability studies. He now co-edits "Crip: New Directions in Disability Studies" for NYU Press along with Robert McRuer and Ellen Samuels. He maintained a personal blog from 2004 to 2010 and wrote for Crooked Timber from 2007 to 2012.

== Publications and achievements ==
Bérubé drew attention in the early 1990s for his essays in the Village Voice and Village Voice Literary Supplement (VLS), which dealt with (among other things) political correctness, postmodernism, and cultural studies. In 1994 he published an essay in Harper's Magazine, "Life As We Know It: A Father, A Son, and Genetic Destiny", about his son Jamie, who has Down syndrome, and in 1995 a review essay in The New Yorker on contemporary black intellectuals; these essays, particularly the latter, drew a wide array of energetic and often contentious responses. Some of the VLS essays were revised and republished in Bérubé’s second book, Public Access (1994). Since then, Bérubé has continued to write for newspapers and magazines, including Dissent, the Nation, the New York Times (and New York Times Magazine), the Boston Globe, the Chicago Tribune, and the Washington Post. Since 1997 he has also been a contributor to the Chronicle of Higher Education.

Bérubé's third book, Life As We Know It: A Father, A Family, and an Exceptional Child, was published in 1996. Following a positive review by Beverly Lowry, Life As We Know It was named a New York Times Notable Book of the Year; it was also named as one of the best books of the year by Maureen Corrigan of National Public Radio. It is an expanded account of Jamie's first four years, as well as a discussion of disability rights, abortion and prenatal testing, early intervention programs, early childhood language acquisition, school policy, and theories of justice.

In 2005-06, Bérubé emerged as a critic of David Horowitz's "Academic Bill of Rights"; an account of that campaign, together with a description of Bérubé's pedagogy in undergraduate classes, makes up most of Bérubé’s fifth book, What's Liberal About the Liberal Arts? Classroom Politics and "Bias" in Higher Education (2006). Bérubé also published a number of essays critical of figures on the antiwar left and their response to the terrorist attack of 9/11 and the invasion of Afghanistan, though he said he opposed the Iraq War; the argument was elaborated in his seventh book, The Left At War, published in 2009. In 2016 Bérubé published two books in disability studies: The Secret Life of Stories, a study of narrative strategies involving varieties of intellectual disability, and Life as Jamie Knows It, a sequel to Life as We Know It written with substantial input from the now-adult Jamie Bérubé. In 2021, the Norton Library (W. W. Norton) published his edition of Mary Shelley's Frankenstein. In 2022, he published It's Not Free Speech: Race, Democracy, and Academic Freedom with Jennifer Ruth, and in 2024, he published The Ex-Human: Science Fiction and the Fate of Our Species.

== Personal life ==
Bérubé lives in State College, Pennsylvania, with his wife Janet Lyon. Their son Jamie, the central subject of the books Life as We Know It and Life as Jamie Knows It, lives with them; another son lives in an adjacent house.

== Selected works ==
Author

- Bérubé, Michael (1992). Marginal forces/cultural centers : Tolson, Pynchon, and the politics of the canon.
- Public Access: Literary Theory and American Cultural Politics (1994)
- Life As We Know It: A Father, A Family, and an Exceptional Child (1996)
- The Employment of English: Theory, Jobs, and the Future of Literary Studies (1998)
- What's Liberal About the Liberal Arts? Classroom Politics and "Bias" in Higher Education (2006)
- Rhetorical Occasions: Essays on Humans and the Humanities (2006)
- The Left at War (2009)
- The Humanities, Higher Education, and Academic Freedom: Three Necessary Arguments (with Jennifer Ruth, ISBN 1137506105, 2015)
- The Secret Life of Stories: From Don Quixote to Harry Potter, How Understanding Intellectual Disability Transforms the Way We Read (ISBN 1479823619, 2016)
- Life as Jamie Knows It: An Exceptional Child Grows Up (ISBN 0807019313, 2016)
- It's Not Free Speech: Race, Democracy, and Academic Freedom (with Jennifer Ruth, ISBN 978-1-4214-4387-4, 2022)
- The Ex-Human: Science Fiction and the Fate of Our Species (ISBN 9780231215053, 2024)

Editor

- Higher Education Under Fire: Politics, Economics, and the Crisis of the Humanities (1995) (with Cary Nelson)
- The Aesthetics of Cultural Studies (2004)
- Frankenstein, or the Modern Prometheus, by Mary Shelley (1818 text). Norton Library Edition (2021)

Book reviews

- Bérubé, Michael (Spring 1994). "Beneath the return to the valley of the culture wars". Contemporary Literature. 35 (1): 212–227. doi:10.2307/1208745. JSTOR 1208745.
- review of Gates, Henry Louis Jr. (1992). Loose canons: notes on the culture wars. New York: Oxford University Press.
- review of Graff, Gerald (1992). Beyond the culture wars: how teaching the conflicts can revitalize American education. New York: W. W. Norton.
