= Charlotte Wiedemann =

German journalist and author (born 1954)

Charlotte Wiedemann (born 1954 in Mönchengladbach, West Germany) is a German prize-winning journalist and author. She is mainly known for her reports and essays as freelance journalist for German and Swiss-German news media. Based on her frequent travels to African and Middle Eastern countries, she also authored several non-fiction books. In these, she discussed the perception of political events such as the Holocaust and the Nakba, changes in the political situation in Mali, Iran and North Africa, as well as Western domination and White journalists' views on non-White societies.

== Life and career ==
Following her M.A. in social pedagogy, sociology, and political science from the University of Göttingen, Wiedemann attended the Hamburg School of Journalism. After her first experience as editor at a local newspaper, she worked as political correspondent and reporter in Bonn, Hamburg and Berlin for publications such as Stern, Die Woche and die tageszeitung. From 1999 to 2003, Wiedemann lived on Penang Island in Malaysia, contributing reports from across Southeast Asia for German and Swiss media outlets such as Die Zeit, Le Monde diplomatique, German edition and Neue Zürcher Zeitung.

Wiedemann has also worked as lecturer in journalism training programmes, mainly at the German Protestant School for Journalists in Berlin, but also at the University of Erfurt and the Technical University of Dortmund. In particular, she lectured on journalists' perception of non-European cultures and on reporting about Islamic societies.

Among others, Wiedemann wrote reports about the so-called Arab Spring in Egypt, Tunisia and Yemen. Further, she conducted field research over a number of years since at least 2007 in Mali. In an article of June 2024 for the German website Qantara.de, Wiedemann wrote about the Gaza war. Major interests covered in her articles and books are the cultural bias of white journalists' views on non-white societies and the German debates and definitions of Erinnerungskultur (culture of remembrance), both relating to the prevailing reference to the Holocaust and Nazi Germany, as well as to crimes committed during colonial and modern times.

== Understanding the Pain of Others ==
Two years after her 2022 book Den Schmerz der Anderen begreifen. Holocaust und Weltgedächtnis. (Understanding the Pain of Others. Holocaust and World Memory), Wiedemann described her motivation and research for this work. Due to the German solidarity with Israel, which was declared a "Staatsraison" (raison d'être) in Germany, and the prevailing reference of the culture of remembrance to the Holocaust, she wanted to describe trauma and the respective memory of genocide and other crimes against humanity in regions such as Africa, Asia or the Arab world as equally important historical events that deserve worldwide recognition. Through her experiences as a foreign correspondent and her empathy with the people of these regions, she defined "the culture of remembrance as an ethical resource that belongs at the same time to no one and to everyone."

Furthermore, Wiedemann raises questions as to why these painful experiences in the history of a large part of humanity do not come close to being reflected in the Western European colonial history and Western culture of remembrance. These traumas cited in the book include expulsion and crimes against humanity during German, French or Dutch colonial periods in Namibia, West Africa, Algeria, Vietnam and Indonesia. Further, she draws parallels between so-called punitive actions of the German Waffen-SS in Oradour-sur-Glane in occupied France and the murder of hundreds of local men in the Massacre in Rawagede in Java by Dutch soldiers. The significance of Stalinist crimes in the culture of remembrance in Eastern European countries, as well as the victims of historical or current armed conflicts and right-wing extremist violence are further examples. According to Wiedemann, all of these traumata belong to an "inclusive" culture of remembrance in the sense of Michael Rothberg's "multidirectional memory" and deserve recognition as the "Pain of Others". As a prerequisite for mutual recognition of the equality of all human beings, the author posits "to regard every life as equally precarious and worthy of protection."

== Controversy ==
For 9 November 2022, the anniversary of Kristallnacht, the Goethe-Institut in Tel Aviv and the Rosa Luxemburg Foundation in Israel had announced a panel discussion on the topic of the German "Erinnerungskultur" (culture of remembrance) in relation to the Holocaust and the Nakba. As Wiedemann had just published her book Den Schmerz der Anderen begreifen. Holocaust und Weltgedächtnis. (Understanding the Pain of Others. Holocaust and World Memory) a month before, Wiedemann was to speak with Israeli scholars Amos Goldberg and Bashir Bashir about ways to promote empathetic remembrance "that does justice to different sides and promotes solidarity instead of a competition of victims."

Before this panel discussion, many Israelis felt that the implicit demand that they should deal with the Nakba on the day of remembrance of the November pogroms in Nazi Germany was presumptuous. The Israeli ambassador in Berlin, Ron Prosor, raised massive objections to the choice of date and the discussion of the Nakba on this date, calling this a "trivialization of the Holocaust". After further protests by groups in Germany and Israel, the originally planned date was described by the organizers as "very unfortunate" and postponed to November 11. However, since massive disruptions were feared and "the safety of the panel discussion [...] unfortunately cannot be guaranteed against this background", the event was cancelled. The discussion was later held with the same panelists on 2 February 2023 on the invitation of Susan Neiman, director of the Einstein Forum in Berlin.

As the tageszeitung reported, Wiedemann had expressed indignation in view of the cancellation: "No one intended to equate the Holocaust and Nakba events, which are completely different in their dimensions and consequences." Further, she said "Instead, the topic of the panel should have been a debate, how the respective traumas can be better understood by the other side."

== Reception ==
In his review of Den Schmerz der Anderen begreifen. Holocaust und Weltgedächtnis. for the Internet portal Qantara.de, historian René Wildangel praised Wiedemann's contribution to current debates in Germany about the culture of remembrance (Erinnerungskultur). According to the review, Wiedemann's "instructive changes of perspective and food for thought", based on several examples of colonial crimes and genocides in Asia, the Middle East and Africa are expanding the concept of a culture of remembrance. Her references to the respective traumas resulting from colonial exploitation and national wars represent impulses in coping with history, especially for Germany, to "sharpen our senses and our judgement, and expand our ability to empathise."

Writing for the Frankfurter Rundschau, journalist Micha Brumlik wrote that Wiedemann's book could replace current aggressive debates about colonial crimes and the Holocaust through a wider understanding, "because Wiedemann not only asks which victims are closer to us than others and why." In July 2022, this book was further featured as one of the best non-fiction books by Die Zeit.

== Awards and recognitions ==
- 1996: Emma Award for Women Journalists
- 2007: Journalistenpreis Weltbevölkerung (Prize for Journalists writing about World Population)
- 2008: Medienpreis Entwicklungspolitik (Award for Media on Development) for her essay on democracy in Mali
- 2013: Award of the University of Bayreuth International Graduate School of African Studies
- 2017: Special Award of the Otto-Brenner-Foundation

== Selected publications ==
=== Books in German ===
- Den Schmerz der Anderen begreifen. Holocaust und Weltgedächtnis. Propyläen, Berlin 2022, ISBN 978-3-549-10049-3.
- Der lange Abschied von der weißen Dominanz. dtv, Munich 2019, ISBN 978-3-423-28205-5.
- Der neue Iran. Eine Gesellschaft tritt aus dem Schatten. dtv, Munich 2019, ISBN 978-3-423-34944-4.
- Vom Versuch, nicht weiß zu schreiben. Oder: wie Journalismus unser Weltbild prägt. 3., aktualisierte und erweiterte Auflage, PapyRossa Verlag, Cologne 2018, ISBN 978-3-89438-494-4.
- Mali oder das Ringen um Würde. Meine Reisen in einem verwundeten Land. Pantheon, Munich 2014, ISBN 978-3-570-55257-5.
- „Ihr wisst nichts über uns!“ Meine Reisen durch einen unbekannten Islam. Aktualisierte und überarbeitete Ausgabe, Herder. Freiburg/Basel/Vienna 2012, ISBN 978-3-451-06455-5.
- Die Hütte der kleinen Sätze. Politische Reportagen aus Südostasien. Edition Freitag, Berlin 2004, ISBN 978-3-936252-04-0.

== Literature ==
- Zavadski, Andrei; Macdonald, Sharon; Hilden, Irene; Früh, Anja; Bach, Jonathan; Jethro, Duane; Ramm, Ronda; Von Bieberstein, Alice; Wiedemann, Charlotte; Ouaissa, Amel; März, Moses (2024-06-12). "Germany's Changing Memoryscape: Postsocialist, Postmigrant, and Postcolonial Dynamics". Berliner Blätter (89). doi:10.18452/28815.

== See also ==
- Postcolonial international relations
- Intersectionality
- Critical race theory
