= Gerald Graff =

American academic (born 1937)

Gerald Graff (born 1937) is a professor of English and Education at the University of Illinois Chicago. He received his B.A. in English from the University of Chicago in 1959 and his Ph.D. in English and American Literature from Stanford University in 1963. He has taught at the University of New Mexico, Northwestern University, the University of California, Irvine and University of California, Berkeley, as well as Ohio State University, Washington University in St. Louis, and the University of Chicago. He has been teaching at the University of Illinois Chicago since 2000.

== Work ==
Graff's earlier works emphasized literature's rational, discursive qualities, and in Literature Against Itself (1979) he took aim at what he saw as the anti-mimetic, irrationalist assumptions underlying both avant-garde writing and structuralist/poststructuralist critical theory. Graff's emphasis on literature as rational statement bears comparison with the theories of Yvor Winters, his professor at Stanford in the 1960s.

Graff's later research has a heavy focus on pedagogy. He has discussed things like his own dislike of books at an early age and the way in which academic discourse is needlessly obscure. Graff is also the founder of Teachers for a Democratic Culture, an organization dedicated, in their words, to "combating conservative misrepresentations" of college pedagogy.

Graff coined the term "teach the controversy" in his college courses in the 1980s and later set the idea in print in his 1993 book Beyond The Culture Wars. Graff's thesis was that college instructors should teach the conflicts around academic issues so that students may understand how knowledge becomes established and eventually accepted. The term "teach the controversy" has since become better known after having been appropriated in a different form as the "teach the controversy" movement by individuals seeking to legitimize the teaching of creationism and intelligent design in classrooms. A self-described liberal secularist, Graff has publicly lamented what he considers the misappropriation of his idea for unscholarly purposes.

Graff teaches both graduate courses on teaching undergraduate writing and undergraduate writing courses. He teaches writing courses with his wife, Cathy Birkenstein, who is a lecturer in English and received her Ph.D. in American literature. She created the templates that make up They Say/I Say, a composition textbook that gives students templates to use in their academic writing.

Also, while at the University of Chicago, Graff co-founded the Master of Arts Program in the Humanities (MAPH), a one-year interdisciplinary program, allowing students to take courses in philosophy, English, art history, and other fields. He was president of the Modern Language Association in 2008.

== Bibliography ==
- Poetic statement and critical dogma. 1970.
- Literature Against Itself: Literary Ideas in Modern Society (1979)
- Criticism in the university (1980)
- Professing Literature: An Institutional History (1987)
- Beyond the Culture Wars: How Teaching the Conflicts Can Revitalize American Education (1993)
- Clueless in Academe: How Schooling Obscures the Life of the Mind (2004)
- They Say/I Say: The Moves that Matter in Academic Writing (with Cathy Birkenstein) (2005)

=== Critical studies and reviews of Graff's work ===
Beyond the culture wars

Bérubé, Michael (Spring 1994). "Beneath the return to the valley of the culture wars". Contemporary Literature. 35 (1): 212–227. doi:10.2307/1208745. JSTOR 1208745.
