= Michael Rothberg =

American academic

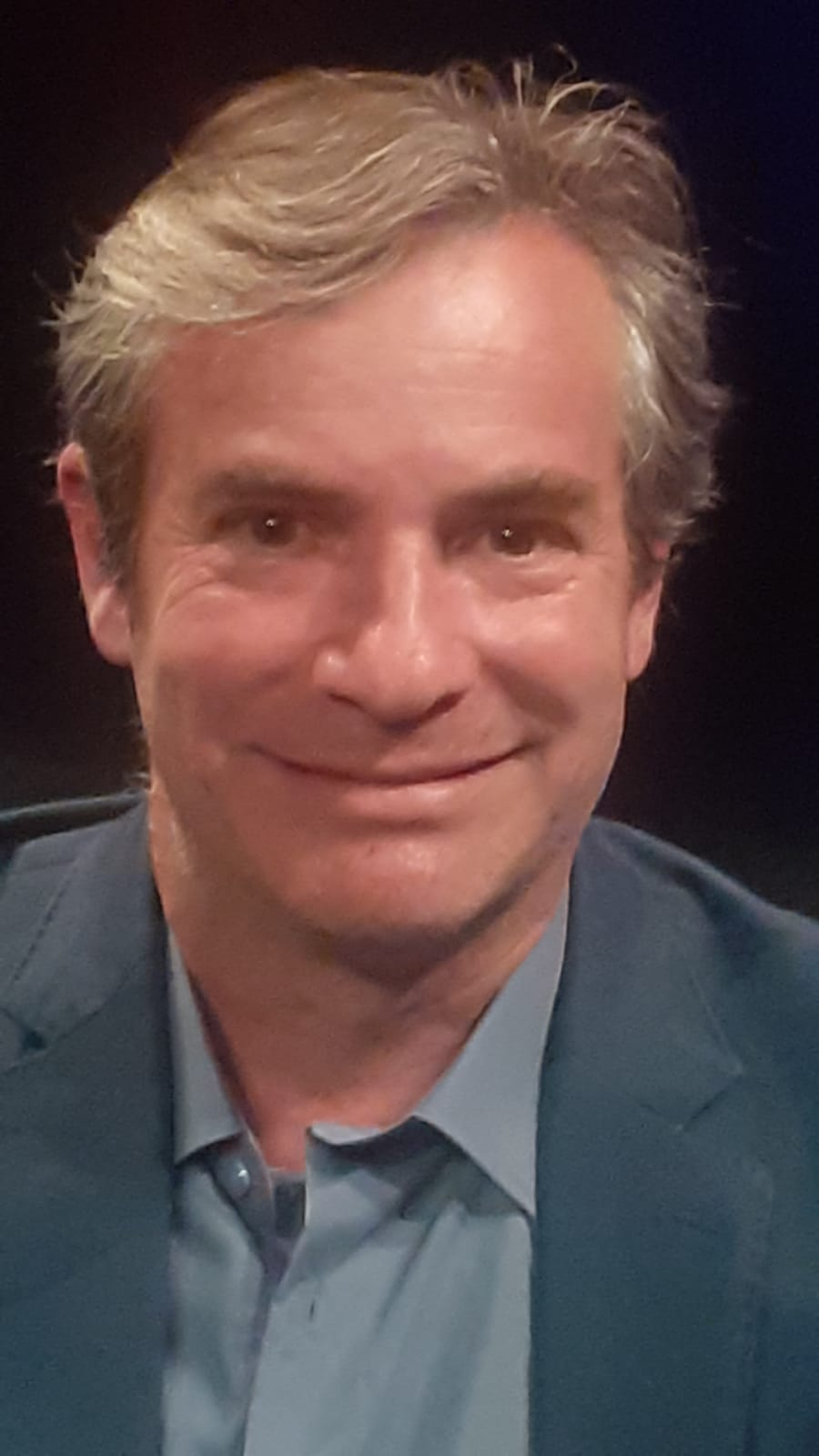
- Michael Rothberg 2024 Kampnagel
- Born: New Haven, Connecticut, USA
- Spouse: Yasemin Yildiz

Academic background
- Education: B.A., 1988, English and Linguistics, Swarthmore College; PhD., Comparative Literature, CUNY Graduate Center
- Thesis: Documenting barbarism: memory, culture, and modernity after the "Final solution" (1995)
- Doctoral advisor: Nancy K. Miller

Academic work
- Discipline: English
- Sub-discipline: Holocaust studies
- Institutions: University of Miami; University of Illinois at Urbana-Champaign; University of California, Los Angeles
- Main interests: Holocaust studies, trauma and memory studies, critical theory and cultural studies, postcolonial studies, and contemporary literatures
- Website: michaelrothberg.weebly.com

Michael Rothberg is an American literature and memory studies scholar. He is a professor of English and Comparative Literature and the 1939 Society Samuel Goetz Chair in Holocaust Studies at the University of California, Los Angeles (UCLA). He was the founding director of the Initiative in Holocaust, Genocide, and Memory Studies at University of Illinois at Urbana-Champaign.

== Early life and education ==
Rothberg was born to parents Sondra and Joseph alongside his sister Madeleine.

In his first year at Swarthmore College, Rothberg discovered Literary Theory through reading Jonathan Culler's book Saussure. Rothberg stated this left a big impression on him and led him to read Jacques Derrida, Michel Foucault, and Jacques Lacan. While attending graduate school at Duke University, Rothberg studied with Fredric Jameson, among other people, around Marxist theory. After taking a few years off from school, he returned to his graduate studies, this time at CUNY Graduate Center. Rothberg wrote his dissertation, "Documenting Barbarism: Memory, Culture and Modernity after the "Final Solution" in 1995 under the direction of Nancy K. Miller.

== Career ==
Rothberg's interest in Holocaust studies and postcolonial studies began during his studies at CUNY Graduate Center. He was interested in investigating the relationship between Jewish American culture and African American culture. After reading Paul Gilroy’s book The Black Atlantic in the 1990s, Rothberg began constructing his first book, titled Traumatic Realism. The book was published while Rothberg was an assistant professor in the Department of English at the University of Miami. Traumatic Realism was published by the University of Minnesota Press in 2000 and it used a multitude of writings to understanding different representations of the Holocaust.

Following this, Rothberg earned a position at the University of Illinois at Urbana-Champaign. From 2003 until 2009, he served as the Director of Illinois’s Unit for Criticism and Interpretive Theory. Beginning in 2009, Rothberg was Founding Director of the Initiative in Holocaust, Genocide, and Memory Studies at the university and was given the honorific of Professor. He also published Multidirectional Memory: Remembering the Holocaust in the Age of Decolonization that same year. The book, published by Stanford University Press, discussed how the memory of the Holocaust was reiterated in the articulation of other histories of victimization in the Caribbean, Africa, Europe, and the United States. In her 2022 book, Den Schmerz der Anderen begreifen. Holocaust und Weltgedächtnis. (Understanding the Pain of Others. Holocaust and World Memory), German author Charlotte Wiedemann referred to Rothberg's notion of multidimensional memory, when she called for an "inclusive" culture of recognition of the "Pain of Others", regardless of the place where crimes against humanity may have taken place.

Two years later, in 2011, Rothberg, Yasemin Yildiz, and Andrés Nader earned a fellowship with the American Council of Learned Societies. In 2013, Rothberg was named Head of the Department of English and his essay "Progress, Progression, Procession: William Kentridge and the Narratology of Transitional Justice," was named the best of the year’s publications in the journal Narrative. He was replaced as Head of the department by Vicki Mahaffey in 2016 and accepted a position as the 1939 Society Samuel Goetz Chair in Holocaust Studies at the University of California, Los Angeles.

In 2019, Rothberg published The Implicated Subject: Beyond Victims and Perpetrators through the Stanford University Press.

== Selected publication ==
The following is a list of selected publications:

- Traumatic realism: the demands of Holocaust representation (2000)
- Multidirectional memory: remembering the Holocaust in the age of decolonization (2009)
- The implicated subject: beyond victims and perpetrators (2019)
