= Marion Frances Chevalier =

Marion Frances Chevalier (January 21, 1902 – February 17, 1990) was a philologist best known for her discovery in the Bibliothèque d'Orléans of The Adventures and Marriage of Panurge, a play by Pousset de Montauban that had remained unknown for 250 years, even though it was the first drama derived from the works of Rabelais. Her analysis of this play formed the basis of her Ph.D. thesis, in 1933, from Johns Hopkins University, under the supervision of Henry Carrington Lancaster.

A professorship in French and Comparative Literature was established in her name at the University of Southern California. The professorship has been held by scholars such as Lydie Moudileno and Peggy Kamuf. A photograph of her can be found in the Johns Hopkins University Historical Photograph Collection.
