= Moral example =

A moral example is a role model who assists in the teaching of morality.

Moral examples and their accompanying stories with morals can be more interesting than philosophical instruction on morality.

Peter Kreeft argues that moral examples work because children learn morality through experience, and moral examples in literature fill in experiences they may not have.

It is the case that since the exact circumstances and decisions of the lives of such moral examples cannot be reproduced or repeated, followers are often reduced to following their etiquette and customs, e.g. in ancestor worship.

Storytelling can take a central role in any culture built on moral example, particularly when the provider of the moral example does not refer to an explicit ethical theory or philosophy as the basis for their behavior. A complex culture built on such stories can fall prey to a clique of experts who interpret them for the lay public. This has led in the past to institutions that sort through anecdotes to decide which of them are true, e.g. isnad in Islam by which the hadith are validated.

Examples of religious moral examples include Jesus in Christianity and the Buddha in Buddhism.

== See also ==
- Civics
- Ethics
- Etiquette
- Moral code
- Moral core
- Role model
- Virtue ethics
