= Nancy K. Miller =

American literary critic

- Born: February 21, 1941 (age 85); New York City

Academic background
- Education: B.A., Barnard College; M.A., Middlebury College; PhD., Columbia University
- Thesis: Gender and genre: an analysis of literary femininity in the eighteenth-century novel (1974)

Academic work
- Institutions: CUNY Graduate Center
- Notable students: Michael Rothberg
- Website: nancykmiller.com

Nancy K. Miller (born 21 February 1941) is an American literary scholar, feminist theorist and memoirist. Currently a Distinguished Professor of English and Comparative Literature at the CUNY Graduate Center, Miller is the author of several books on feminist criticism, women’s writing, and most recently, family memoir, biography, and trauma.

== Education ==
She received her B.A. from Barnard College (1961), her M.A. from Middlebury College, and her Ph.D. in French at Columbia University.

== Career ==
In 1981, Miller became the first full-time tenured member of the Women’s Studies program at Barnard College and was appointed its director, a post she held until her appointment at CUNY in 1988. Prior to that, she taught in the French department at Columbia University.

Miller founded the Gender and Culture Series at Columbia University Press in 1983 along with feminist scholar Carolyn Heilbrun, and continues to co-edit the series. Between 2004 and 2007, she and geographer Cindi Katz co-edited the journal Women’s Studies Quarterly, which received the Phoenix Award for Significant Editorial Achievement from the Council of Editors of Learned Journals under their leadership.

Miller has been a visiting professor at Harvard University, Hebrew University, and Tel Aviv University, and a Phi Beta Kappa Visiting Scholar. She is the winner of numerous fellowships and awards, including the Rockefeller Foundation Humanities Fellowship, the John Simon Guggenheim Memorial Foundation Fellowship, and the NEH Senior Fellowship.

== Contributions ==
Miller's early contributions to literary theory include that of the “invisible intertext” added by women to a more conventional form of writing, as by blending a quest plot with the romantic plot normatively prescribed to early female authors. She was further notable for her opposition to Roland Barthes's influential theory of The Death of the Author, pointing out how this tended to occlude gender subjectivities in a text through emphasising what she called the web, as opposed to the role of the weaver: the theory serving thereby as a postmodern mask for phallocentrism. Her position gave rise to a famous debate within feminism on the issue with Peggy Kamuf.

Miller also played an influential role in pioneering the unification of personal accounts with theoretical explorations inside the same text, thus making concrete second wave feminism's linking of the personal and public realms.

== Bibliography ==
- My Brilliant Friends: Our Lives in Feminism (2019) ISBN 978-0-231-19054-1
- Breathless: An American Girl in Paris (2013) ISBN 978-1-580-05488-1
- What They Saved: Pieces of a Jewish Past (2011) ISBN 978-0-8032-3001-9
- But Enough About Me: Why We Read Other People's Lives (2002) ISBN 978-0-231-12523-9
- Extremities: Trauma, Testimony, and Community, co-edited with Jason Tougaw (2002) ISBN 978-0-252-07054-9
- Bequest and Betrayal: Memoirs of a Parent's Death (2000) ISBN 978-0-253-21379-2
- French Dressing: Women, Men, and Fiction in the Ancien Regime (1995) ISBN 978-0-415-90321-9
- Contre-courants: les femmes s'écrivent à travers les siècles, with Mary Ann Caws, Elizabeth Houlding, and Cheryl Morgan (1994) ISBN 978-0-13-042920-9
- Getting Personal: Feminist Occasions and Other Autobiographical Acts (1991) ISBN 978-0-415-90324-0
- Subject to Change: Reading Feminist Writing (1988) ISBN 978-0-231-06661-7
- The Poetics of Gender (1986) ISBN 978-0-231-06311-1
- The Heroine's Text: Readings in the French and English Novel, 1722-1782 (1980) ISBN 978-0-231-04910-8
