= Schizoanalysis =

Set of theories

Schizoanalysis (or ecosophy, pragmatics, micropolitics, rhizomatics, or nomadology) (French: schizoanalyse; schizo- from Greek σχίζειν [skhizein], meaning 'to split') is a set of theories and techniques developed by philosopher Gilles Deleuze and psychoanalyst Félix Guattari, first expounded in their book Anti-Oedipus (1972) and continued in their follow-up work, A Thousand Plateaus (1980).

== Overview ==
[T]he goal of schizoanalysis: to analyze the specific nature of the libidinal investments in the economic and political spheres, and thereby show how, in the subject who desires, desire can be made to desire its own repression—whence the role of the death instinct in the circuit connecting desire to the social sphere. [...] Schizoanalysis is at once a transcendental and a materialist analysis.

— Deleuze and Guattari

The practice acquired many different definitions, uses and articulations during the course of its development in collaborative work with Deleuze and individually in the work of Guattari; for instance, in Guattari's final work, Chaosmosis, he explained that "rather than moving in the direction of reductionist modifications which simplify the complex", schizoanalysis "will work towards its complexification, its processual enrichment, towards the consistency of its virtual lines of bifurcation and differentiation, in short towards its ontological heterogeneity" whereupon it could take on the same tasks expected of revolutionary ideologies and political projects.

=== Background ===
Schizoanalysis [...] has no other meaning: Make a rhizome.

— Deleuze and Guattari

Schizoanalysis was developed by Guattari as an open-ended theoretical practice responding to the perceived shortcomings of French psychoanalytic practice and as the culmination of his work with institutional psychotherapy at the La Borde clinic. Guattari was regularly confronted with the use of the Oedipus complex as a starting point for analysis, and the uneven dynamic of the authority figure of the psychoanalyst in relationship to the patient. Guattari was interested in a practice that could derive, from given systems of enunciation and subjective structures, new "assemblages [agencements] of enunciation" capable of forging new coordinates of analysis, and to create unforeseen propositions and representations from the standpoint of psychosis that would yield positive conclusions to analysis.

The new materialism takes from Nietzsche the notion that each body or product is a synthesis of forces, a sign or symptom of a mode of existence. Desire is never something that is missing, forbidden, or signified: desire is a power of synthesis that constructs an assemblage in order to increase its power of acting.

— Philip Goodchild

Deleuze would later begin to break away from the framework, stating that in 1973 that "we no longer want to talk about schizoanalysis, because that would amount to protecting a particular type of escape, schizophrenic escape".

== Concepts ==
Schizoanalysis, then, is a form of social analysis according to abstract machines, lines of flight or deterritorialisation, regimes of signs, the stratification of molecular elements or their destratification, and planes of consistency. It maps the social unconscious according to its movements and intensities of desire. [...] so that lines of experimentation or becoming may be constructed through a reassembling of the abstract machines that lie between the strata and produce them.

— Philip Goodchild

In the phrasing of David Burrows and Simon O'Sullivan, schizoanalysis is a project of "experiments that dissemble and dissolve the self and other configurations and modes of organisation, but that also propose that an individual is composed of a diversity of different individuations, of other durations, both organic and inorganic [...] it is schizoanalysis that reveals that a sense of self can be made and unmade". Deleuze and Guattari themselves summarized schizoanalytic practice in the fourth chapter of Anti-Oedipus, "Introduction to Schizoanalysis", as prompting the questions "What are your desiring-machines, what do you put into these machines, what is the output, how does it work, what are your nonhuman sexes?". In this sense, they developed four theses of schizoanalysis:

1. Every unconscious libidinal investment is social and bears upon a socio-historical field.
2. Unconscious libidinal investments of group or desire are distinct from preconscious investments of class or interest.
3. Non-familial libidinal investments of the social field are primary in relation to familial investments.
4. Social libidinal investments are distinguished according to two poles: a paranoiac reactionary pole, and a schizoid revolutionary pole.

=== Schizoanalyst ===
The schizoanalyst is a mechanic, and schizoanalysis is solely functional. [...] Analysis should deal solely [...] with the machinic arrangements grasped in the context of their molecular dispersion. [...] every partial object emits a flow [in the field of multiplicity ] [...] Partial objects are direct powers of the body without organs, and the body without organs, the raw material of the partial objects. [...] The body without organs is an immanent substance [...connecting] Spinozist [...partial-object-like] attributes [that enunciate its haecceity ][.]

— Deleuze and Guattari

A schizoanalyst cannot be considered a kind of deconstructionist; in Guattari's terms, they pass what is understood to be logos through a text-machine-subject having the status of a partial object to express praxis-enslavement by—in Deleuze and Guattari's French—puissance, and the experience of the process of machinic enslavement. Schizoanalysis addresses ressentiment by leading the neurotic subject to a rhizomatic state of becoming. Schizoanalysis uses psychosis as a figurative-philosophical diagrammatic model, creating abstract machines that go beyond a semiotic simulacrum, generating a reality not already present. Contradistinct from the psychoanalytic axiom of lack generating the kernel at the core of the subject, schizoanalytic desiring-production of intensities decode "representational territories" by self-generating the subject-becoming-BwO as a multiplicity. Desiring-production is a virtuality of becoming-intense, a becoming-Other. Schizoanalysis deterritorializes-reterritorializes found assemblages through rhizomatic desiring-production.

=== Body without organs ===
The body without organs is a metaphysical concept of Deleuze and Guattari's that they considered in A Thousand Plateaus to be "the only practical object of schizoanalysis". It is state of freedom that they refer to as "the unproductive, the sterile, the unengendered, the unconsumable". Bodies without organs are produced by the unconscious when desiring-production achieves its third nonproductive stage; a body without organs is "produced as a whole, but in its own particular place within the process of production, alongside the parts that it neither unifies nor totalizes." Deleuze wrote, prior to his work with Guattari, in The Logic of Sense that "a body without organs, with neither mouth nor anus, having given up all introjection or projection, and being complete, at this price", is "closed on a full depth without limits and without exteriority."

=== Four functors ===
The four functors, or ontological dimensions, are concepts that were deployed by Guattari within a typical clinical model of the unconscious, which are laid out in the following schema:

1. Fluxes: material, energetic and semiotic transformations (for instance, libido)
2. Territories: finite existential subjectifications (for instance, the notion of self and the process of transference)
3. Universes of reference (value): virtual incorporeal enunciative alterifications (for instance, complexes and the process of sublimation)
4. Phylum (machinic): drive deterritorialization (for instance, Deleuze and Guattari's notion of breakdown as breakthrough, and the Lacanian sinthome)

The territory (first assemblage that appears by decoding) is the social field of deterritorialization and reterritorialization, while the flux and phylum are the components of abstract machines. With these functors, there are four circular components that bud and form rhizomes:

1. The generative component: the study of concrete mixed semiotics; their mixtures and variations, making a tracing of the mixed semiotics.
2. The transformational component: the study of pure semiotics; their transformations-translations and the creation of new semiotics, making the transformational map of the regimes, with their possibilities for translation and creation, for budding along the lines of the tracings.
3. The diagrammatic component: The Real as an Absolute synchronic-parallel diagram of Reality (or Nature), surpassing all regimes of signs by the merging of content and expression.
4. The machinic component: the study of the assemblages that effectuate abstract machines, simultaneously semiotizing matters of expression and physicalizing matters of content, outlining the program of the assemblages that distribute everything and bring a circulation of movement with alternatives, jumps, and mutations.

== Legacy ==
- Manuel DeLanda
- Michael Hardt
- Antonio Negri

=== Nick Land ===
British philosopher and theorist Nick Land, whose critical work and experimental texts in the 1990s frequently cited Deleuze and Guattari, wrote that "schizoanalysis shares in the delicious irresponsibility of everything anarchic, inundating and harshly impersonal." In his 1992 essay "Circuitries", Land described the practice of schizoanalysis as a prescient theory, writing that it "was only possible because we are hurtling into the first globally integrated insanity: politics is obsolete. Capitalism and Schizophrenia hacked into a future that programs it down to its punctuation, connecting with the imminent inevitability of viral revolution, soft fusion." Land's later work in the 1990s, associated with the Cybernetic Culture Research Unit, also further reinterpreted and developed schizoanalysis alongside cybernetics, cyberpunk aesthetics and occultism, most prominently in his 1995 essay "Meltdown":

Machinic Synthesis. Deleuzoguattarian schizoanalysis comes from the future. It is already engaging with nonlinear nano-engineering runaway in 1972; differentiating molecular or neotropic machineries from molar or entropic aggregates of nonassembled particles; functional connectivity from antiproductive static. Philosophy has an affinity with despotism, due to its predilection for Platonic-fascist top-down solutions that always screw up viciously. Schizoanalysis works differently. It avoids Ideas, and sticks to diagrams: networking software for accessing bodies without organs. BwOs, machinic singularities, or tractor fields emerge through the combination of parts with (rather than into) their whole; arranging composite individuations in a virtual/actual circuit.

=== Bard & Söderqvist ===
Swedish philosophers and futurologists Alexander Bard and Jan Söderqvist build from Deleuze & Guattari's schizoanalysis in their book The Body Machines (2009), the third and final installment of The Futurica Trilogy (2000–2009) with Lacan's empty signifier re-added as an extra +1 to a properly implemented 12+1 structure – developed in collaboration with Stockholm's Royal Institute of Art – as both the empty unifier of the psyche and the dissolution of social hierarchy. The authors argue the 12+1 model is a psychoanalytic improvement to the otherwise "Kantian all too Kantian" technique of compartmentalization in psychology. As cultural examples of 12+1 are cited the hour prior to and following the twelve hours of a clock, Christ as living present and dead absent in relation to the twelve Apostles in the New Testament, and the ace card as both superior to the king and inferior to two in a playing card series. In this sense, the socially constructed +1 is nothing but a subject's passport name, understanding capitalist subjectivity as multipolar (twelve being a random number) akin to the urban intersubjectivities explored in musical theatre pieces like Puccini's La bohème and Jonathan Larson's Rent.

=== Radical Black Aesthetic ===
John Gillespie posits that writers Amiri Baraka and Frantz Fanon are schizoanalytic under the lens of critically examining racism (e.g., Black Dada Nihilismus on Dada).

== See also ==
- Anti-psychiatry
- Body without organs
- Capitalism and Schizophrenia
- Carnivalesque
- Hypertext fiction
- Institutional psychotherapy
- Interdisciplinarity
- Line of flight
- Minority (philosophy)
- Plane of immanence
- Psychical nomadism

== Sources ==
- Ian Buchanan, 'Schizoanalysis: An Incomplete Project', in B. Dillet, I. Mackenzie & R. Porter eds., The Edinburgh Companion to Poststructuralism, Edinburgh: Edinburgh University Press, 2013, pp. 163–185.
- Deleuze, Gilles and Félix Guattari. 1972. Anti-Oedipus. Trans. Robert Hurley, Mark Seem and Helen R. Lane. London and New York: Continuum, 2004. Vol. 1 of Capitalism and Schizophrenia. 2 vols. 1972–1980. Trans. of L'Anti-Oedipe. Paris: Les Editions de Minuit. ISBN 0-8264-7695-3.
- ---. 1980. A Thousand Plateaus. Trans. Brian Massumi. London and New York: Continuum, 2004. Vol. 2 of Capitalism and Schizophrenia. 2 vols. 1972–1980. Trans. of Mille Plateaux. Paris: Les Editions de Minuit. ISBN 0-8264-7694-5.
- Guattari, Félix. 1989. Cartographies Schizoanalytiques. Paris: Editions Galilee.
- ---. 1992. Chaosmosis: An Ethico-Aesthetic Paradigm. Trans. Paul Bains and Julian Pefanis. Bloomington and Indianapolis: Indiana UP, 1995. Trans. of Chaosmose. Paris: Editions Galilee. ISBN 0-909952-25-6.
- Holland, Eugene. 1999. Deleuze and Guattari's Anti Oedipus: Introduction to Schizoanalysis. Oxford: Routledge.
