= Signified and signifier =

Concepts in semiotics

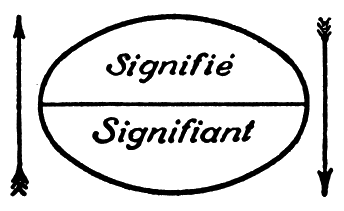
A generic diagram from de Saussure's Course in General Linguistics illustrating the relationship between signified (French: signifié) and signifier (signifiant)

In semiotics, signified and signifier (French: signifié and signifiant) are the two main components of a sign, where signified is what the sign represents or refers to, known as the "plane of content", and signifier is the observable aspects of the sign itself, known as the "plane of expression". The idea was first proposed in the work of Swiss linguist Ferdinand de Saussure, one of the two founders of semiotics.

== Concept of signs ==
The concept of signs has been around for a long time, having been studied by many classic philosophers such as Plato, Aristotle, Augustine, William of Ockham, and Francis Bacon, among others. The term semiotics derives from the Greek root seme, as in semeiotikos (an 'interpreter of signs'). It was not until the early part of the 20th century, however, that Saussure and American philosopher Charles Sanders Peirce brought the term into more common use.

While both Saussure and Peirce contributed greatly to the concept of signs, each differed in their approach to the study. Saussure who created the terms signifier and signified in order to break down what a sign was. He diverged from the previous studies on language as he focused on the present in relation to the act of communication, rather than the history and development of words and language over time.

Succeeding these founders were numerous philosophers and linguists who defined themselves as semioticians. These semioticians have each brought their own concerns to the study of signs. Umberto Eco (1976), a distinguished Italian semiotician, came to the conclusion that "if signs can be used to tell the truth, they can also be used to lie." Postmodernist social theorist Jean Baudrillard spoke of hyperreality, referring to a copy becoming more real than reality, the signifier becoming more important than the signified. French semiotician Roland Barthes used signs to explain the concept of connotation—cultural meanings attached to words—and denotation—literal or explicit meanings of words. Without Saussure's breakdown of signs into signified and signifier, however, these semioticians would not have had anything to base their concepts on.

== Relation between signifier and signified ==
Saussure, in his 1916 Course in General Linguistics, divides the sign into two distinct components: the signifier ('sound-image') and the signified ('concept'). For Saussure, the signified and signifier are purely psychological: they are form rather than substance.

Today, the signifier is often interpreted as the conceptual material form, i.e. something which can be seen, heard, touched, smelled or tasted; and the signified as the conceptual ideal form. In other words, "contemporary commentators tend to describe the signifier as the form that the sign takes and the signified as the concept to which it refers." The relationship between the signifier and signified is an arbitrary relationship: "there is no logical connection" between them. This differs from a symbol, which is "never wholly arbitrary." The idea that both the signifier and the signified are inseparable is explained by Saussure's diagram, which shows how both components coincide to create the sign.

In order to understand how the signifier and signified relate to each other, one must be able to interpret signs. "The only reason that the signifier does entail the signified is because there is a conventional relationship at play." That is, a sign can only be understood when the relationship between the two components that make up the sign are agreed upon. Saussure argued that the meaning of a sign "depends on its relation to other words within the system;" for example, to understand an individual word such as "tree," one must also understand the word "bush" and how the two relate to each other.

It is this difference from other signs that allows the possibility of a speech community. However, we need to remember that signifiers and their significance change all the time, becoming "dated." It is in this way that we are all "practicing semioticians who pay a great deal of attention to signs … even though we may never have heard them before." Moreover, while words are the most familiar form signs take, they stand for many things within life, such as advertisement, objects, body language, music, and so on. Therefore, the use of signs, and the two components that make up a sign, can be and are—whether consciously or not—applied to everyday life.

== Depth psychology and philosophy ==
=== Lacanianism ===
Jacques Lacan presented formulas for the ideas of the signified and the signifier in his texts and seminars, specifically repurposing Freud's ideas to describe the roles that the signified and the signifier serve as follows:

There is a 'barrier' of repression between Signifiers (the unconscious mind: 'discourse of the Other') and the signified […] a 'chain' of signifiers is analogous to the 'rings of a necklace that is a ring in another necklace made of rings' […] 'The signifier is that which represents a subject (fantasy-construct) for another signifier'.

— Lacan, paraphrased

==== Floating signifier ====
Originating in an idea from Claude Lévi-Strauss, the concept of floating signifiers, or empty signifiers, has since been repurposed in Lacanian theory as the concept of signifiers that are not linked to tangible things by any specific reference for them, and are "floating" or "empty" because of this separation. Slavoj Žižek defines this in The Sublime Object of Ideology as follows:

[T]he multitude of 'floating signifiers' […] is structured into a unified field through the intervention of a certain 'nodal point' (Lacanian point de capiton) which 'quilts' them [to] […] the 'rigid designator', which totalizes an ideology by bringing to a halt the metonymic sliding of its signified […] it is a signifier without the signified'.

=== Signified ===
The signified is [an untranslatable, atmospheric irreducibility of the-chain-of-signifiers-abstracted]; the disclosed barrier (between the-chain-of-signifiers qua signified) is a metaphor-repression-transference journey through place.

=== Schizoanalysis ===
In their theory of schizoanalysis, Gilles Deleuze and Félix Guattari made radical uses of the ideas of the signified and the signifier following Lacan. In A Thousand Plateaus, extending from their ideas of deterritorialization and reterritorialization, they developed the idea of "faciality" to refer to the interplay of signifiers in the process of subjectification and the production of subjectivity. The "face" in faciality is a system that "brings together a despotic wall of interconnected signifiers and passional black holes of subjective absorption". Black holes, fixed on white walls which antagonized flows bounce off of, are the active destruction, or deterritorialization, of signs. What makes the power exerted by the face of a subject possible is that, creating an intense initial confusion of meaning, it continues to signify through its persistent refusal to signify.

Significance is never without a white wall upon which it inscribes its signs and redundancies. Subjectification is never without a black hole in which it lodges its consciousness, passion, and redundancies. Since all semiotics are mixed and strata come at least in twos, it should come as no surprise that a very special mechanism is situated at their intersection. Oddly enough, it is a face: the white wall/black hole system. […] The gaze is but secondary in relation to the gazeless eyes, to the black hole of faciality. The mirror is but secondary in relation to the white wall of faciality.

What distinguishes this radical use and systemization of the signified and the signifier as interplaying in subjectivity from Lacan and Sartre as well as their philosophical predecessors in general is that, beyond a resolution with the oppressive forces of faciality and the dominance of the face, Deleuze and Guattari reproach the preservation of the face as a system of a tight regulation of signifiers and destruction of signs, declaring that "if human beings have a destiny, it is rather to escape the face, to dismantle the face and facializations".

== See also ==
- Signifyin'
