= Body without organs =

Concept in philosophy

A schizoanalytical diagram of the social dynamic of the body without organs, from Anti-Oedipus.

The body without organs (or BwO; French: corps sans organes or CsO) is a concept used in the work of French philosophers Gilles Deleuze and Félix Guattari. The concept describes the unregulated potential of a body ('body' meaning any object or system, not just a human or animal body) without organizational structures imposed on its constituent parts, operating freely. The term, first used by French writer Antonin Artaud, appeared in his 1947 play To Have Done With the Judgment of God. Deleuze later adapted it in his 1969 book The Logic of Sense, and ambiguously expanded upon it in collaboration with Guattari in both volumes of their work Capitalism and Schizophrenia (1972 and 1980).

Building on the general abstract notion of the body in metaphysics, and on the unconscious in psychoanalysis, Deleuze and Guattari theorized that since the conscious and unconscious fantasies in psychosis and schizophrenia express potential forms and functions of the body that demand it to be liberated, the reality of the homeostatic process of the body is that it is limited by its organization and more so by its organs. There are three types of the body without organs; the empty, the full, and the cancerous, according to what the body has achieved.

== Background ==
The phrase body without organs was first used by the French writer Antonin Artaud in his 1947 play To Have Done With the Judgment of God. Referring to his ideal for man as a philosophical subject, he wrote in its epilogue:

When you will have made him a body without organs, then you will have delivered him from all his automatic reactions and restored him to his true freedom.

Artaud is regarded as having viewed the body as an impermanent, composite image of actions inflicted upon a vulnerable and repressive physical structure; in a 1933 letter, he wrote that bodies should be understood only as "provisional stratifications of states of life".

Deleuze reinterpreted the term in The Logic of Sense, inspired both by Artaud's text and the work of psychotherapist Gisela Pankow; here, he conceptualized the body without organs in the context of psychoanalysis, observing that the practice as it existed refused the thorough creation of BwOs. In Deleuze's early formulations of the concept, the body without organs was based in the symptoms related to schizophrenia, such as glossolalia where syllables are formlessly uttered and intoned in sets as if they were words. For Deleuze, glossolalia transforms words from having instrumental value, where words have literal meaning, to "values which are exclusively tonic [relating to speech] and not written", creating—in the case of language—lingual and verbal bodies without organs.

== Usage ==
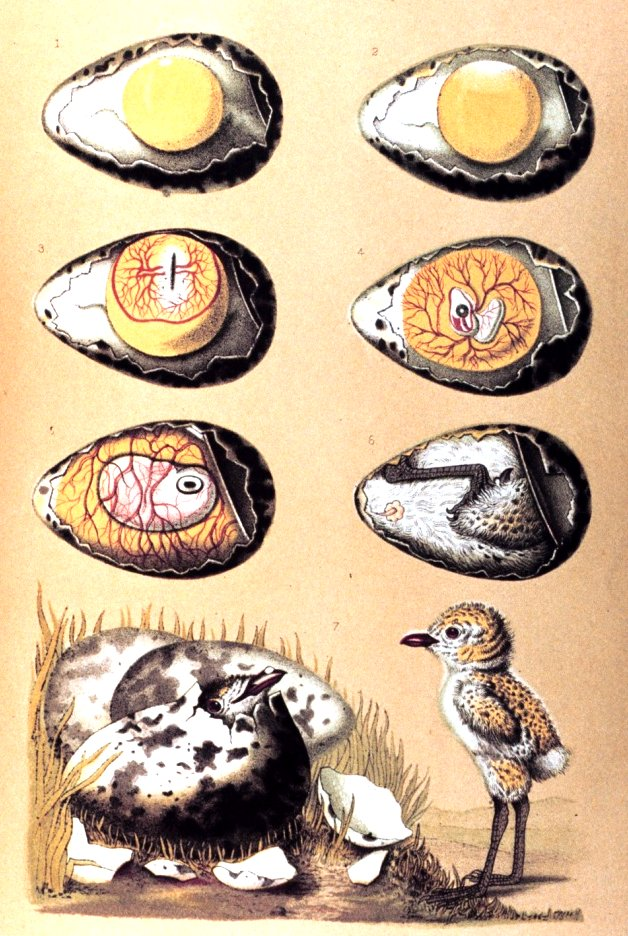
The development of a bird egg; the egg is a prominent figure of the body without organs in Capitalism and Schizophrenia.

The concept of the body without organs was mainly defined by Deleuze and Guattari in Capitalism and Schizophrenia. In both volumes, Anti-Oedipus and A Thousand Plateaus, the abstract body is defined as a self-regulating process—created by the relation between an abstract machine and a machinic assemblage—that maintains itself through processes of homeostasis and simultaneously limits the possible activities of its constituent parts, or organs. The body without organs is the sum total intensive and affective activity of the full potential for the body and its constituent parts.

Deleuze and Guattari presume, in a continuation from Samuel Butler's radical departure from vitalism in "Darwin among the Machines", that since all organisms have some sort of abstract inclination or desire—in the case of nonhuman life such as plants and animals, their genetic instincts variably control what actions they take—the body without organs is the inevitable, unconstrained manifestation of those inclinations or desires that may take upon unprecedented forms. The concept of the body that the body without organs refers to elements from both the concept of substance proposed by Baruch Spinoza and the concept of "intensive magnitude" in Immanuel Kant's Critique of Pure Reason, wherein it is defined not by closed and determinate activity but by cohesion through affective potential. A body without organs can consist of many different actions that approach an unattainable goal, many of which are the activities of assemblages that people unconsciously create and are always engaged in; to become a body without organs, one must dispose of stratification (the classification of constituent parts into groups), and instead give way to what Deleuze and Guattari described as an immanent "becoming" of pure intensity. The body without organs is not necessarily coupled with the eradication of stratification, but rather encourages the creation of a "smooth space", immanently transforming the body beyond its existing categorization.

The bodies—not merely physical but intensive—of schizophrenics, drug addicts, and hypochondriacs are examples they give of bodies without organs, but they caution against replicating their actions; people should not seek out their negative experiences, which are "catatonicized" and "vitrified". While these examples are said to have abandoned stratification, they never intensified, which makes their bodies without organs vulnerable to re-stratification. They classify bodies without organs into three categories: (Note: These categories were developed in A Thousand Plateaus.) The empty BwO is chaotic and undifferentiated because it undergoes destratification without intensification; the full BwO is a "plane of consistency" because it is both destratified and intensified, which allows it to enter new relationships; meanwhile, the cancerous BwO is too stratified and becomes "majoritarian", having predetermined objectives that eliminate the body's potential.

Two important examples of the body without organs relate to eggs. As a bird egg develops, it is nothing but the dispersion of protein gradients, which have varying intensities and have no apparent structure; for Deleuze and Guattari, a bird egg is an instance of life "before the formation of the strata", since changes in the qualitative elements of the egg will emerge as a changed organism. Relatedly, in the Dogon culture, there is a belief in an egg that encompasses the universe, where the universe is an "intensive spatium" (an intensive interior), similar to a bird egg. According to Deleuze and Guattari, the Dogon egg is an intensive body, crossed with several zig-zagging lines of vibration, changing its shape as it develops without being compartmentalized through organs.

=== Ambiguity ===
The body without organs remains one of Deleuze and Guattari's more ambiguous concepts and terms; over the course of their careers, the term changed in meaning and was used synonymously with others, such as the plane of immanence. Deleuze and Guattari were unsure whether they referred to the same concept when using the term; scholars of Deleuze and Guattari have also expressed "little to no agreement" on the term, according to philosopher Ian Buchanan.

== Interpretations ==
=== Nick Land ===
English philosopher Nick Land, who was reliant on the work of Deleuze and Guattari in his theoretical work of the 1990s, used the concept of the body without organs in relation to his "cybergothic" reinterpretation of continental philosophy. In his philosophy, the body without organs is defined by Land (alongside Deleuze and Guattari in Anti-Oedipus) as a model of death with an infinite capacity for dispersion of its elements. For instance, in the conclusion of his 1993 essay "Art as Insurrection", he writes:

The body without organs is [...] at once [a] material abstraction, and the concretely hypostasized differential terrain which is nothing other than what is instantaneously shared by difference. The body without organs is pure surface, because it is the mere coherence of differential web, but it is also the source of depth [...]

Similarly, in his 1995 essay "Cybergothic", Land identified the body without organs as a concept in the lineage of representations of "death as time-in-itself"—or "degree 0" of an intensive continuum—within which experiential time is a profusion of indeterminate states, corresponding both to the schizophrenic consciousness and to the dissipation of matter through death; this lineage also includes Spinoza's substance, Kant's "pure apperception", Sigmund Freud's death drives, and most notably, American novelist William Gibson's notion of cyberspace.

== See also ==
- Desiring-production
- Plane of immanence
- Substance theory
- Thallus

== Notes and references ==
=== Bibliography ===
- Adkins, Brent (2015). Deleuze and Guattari's A thousand plateaus: A critical introduction and guide. Edinburgh University Press. ISBN 9780748686452.
- Albertsen, Niels; Diken, Bülent (2006). "Society with/out organs". In Fuglsang, Martin; Sørensen, Bent Meier (eds.). Deleuze and the social. Edinburgh University Press. ISBN 9780748620920.
- Bazzano, Manu (3 July 2021). "The body-without-organs: A user's manual". European Journal of Psychotherapy & Counselling. 23 (3): 289–303. doi:10.1080/13642537.2021.1961833. S2CID 238794978.
- Brenner, Leon S. (2021). "Is the autistic body a body without organs?". In McLaughlin, Becky R.; Daffron, Eric (eds.). The body in theory: Essays after Lacan and Foucault. Jefferson, North Carolina: McFarland. ISBN 9781476678559.
- Buchanan, Ian (2015). "The 'structural necessity' of the body without organs". In Buchanan, Ian; Matts, Tim; Tynan, Aidan (eds.). Deleuze and the schizoanalysis of literature. London: Bloomsbury. ISBN 9781472529633.
- Carrier, Ronald M. (May 1998). "The ontological significance of Deleuze and Guattari's concept of the body without organs". Journal of the British Society for Phenomenology. 29 (2): 189–206. doi:10.1080/00071773.1998.11665445.
- Clark, Vanessa (16 April 2012). "Art practice as possible worlds". International Journal of Child, Youth and Family Studies. 3 (2–3): 198. doi:10.18357/ijcyfs32-3201210866. hdl:1828/5401.
- Colombat, André Pierre (1991). "A thousand trails to work with Deleuze". SubStance. 20 (3): 10–23. doi:10.2307/3685176. ISSN 0049-2426. JSTOR 3685176.
- Demers, Jason (August 2006). "Re-membering the body without organs". Angelaki. 11 (2): 153–168. doi:10.1080/09697250601029333. S2CID 144031891.
- Fox, Nick J (December 2011). "The ill-health assemblage: Beyond the body-with-organs" (PDF). Health Sociology Review. 20 (4): 359–371. doi:10.5172/hesr.2011.20.4.359. S2CID 144369239.
- Goodman, Steve (2010). Sonic Warfare: Sound, Affect, and the Ecology of Fear. MIT Press. ISBN 978-0-262-01347-5.
- Holland, Eugene W. (2008). "Schizoanalysis, nomadology, fascism". In Buchanan, Ian; Thoburn, Nicholas (eds.). Deleuze and politics. Edinburgh University Press. ISBN 9780748632879.
- Kaufman, Eleanor (2004). "Betraying well". Criticism. 46 (4): 651–659. doi:10.1353/crt.2005.0016. ISSN 0011-1589. JSTOR 23127250. S2CID 258105122.
- Land, Nick (2011). Brassier, Ray; Mackay, Robin (eds.). Fanged Noumena: Collected Writings 1987-2007. MIT Press; Urbanomic. ISBN 9780955308789.
- Leston, Robert (2015). "Deleuze, Haraway, and the radical democracy of desire". Configurations. 23 (3): 355–376. doi:10.1353/con.2015.0023. S2CID 146714920.
- Markula, Pirkko (February 2006). "Deleuze and the body without organs: Disreading the fit feminine identity". Journal of Sport and Social Issues. 30 (1): 29–44. doi:10.1177/0193723505282469. S2CID 144934352.
- Murphy, Jay (2015). "The Artaud effect". CTheory (Theorizing 21C).
- Smith, Daniel (March 2018). "What is the body without organs? Machine and organism in Deleuze and Guattari". Continental Philosophy Review. 51 (1): 95–110. doi:10.1007/s11007-016-9406-0. S2CID 254800444.
- Whitlock, Matthew G. (2020). "The wrong side out with(out) God: An autopsy of the body without organs". Deleuze and Guattari Studies. 14 (3): 507–532. doi:10.3366/dlgs.2020.0414. S2CID 225487537.
