= Line of flight =

Philosophical concept

A line of flight or a line of escape (French: ligne de fuite) is a concept developed by Gilles Deleuze and Félix Guattari in their work Capitalism and Schizophrenia. It describes one out of three lines forming what Deleuze and Guattari call assemblages, and serves as a factor in an assemblage that ultimately allows it to change and adapt to said changes, which can be associated with new sociological, political and psychological factors. Translator Brian Massumi notes that in French, "Fuite covers not only the act of fleeing or eluding but also flowing, leaking, and disappearing into the distance (the vanishing point in a painting is a point de fuite). It has no relation to flying."

In the first chapter of the second volume of their Capitalism and Schizophrenia project, A Thousand Plateaus (1980), the concept is used to define a "rhizome":

Multiplicities are defined by the outside: by the abstract line, the line of flight or deterritorialization according to which they change in nature and connect with other multiplicities. The plane of consistency (grid) is the outside of all multiplicities. The line of flight marks: the reality of a finite number of dimensions that the multiplicity effectively fills; the impossibility of a supplementary dimension, unless the multiplicity is transformed by the line of flight; the possibility and necessity of flattening all of the multiplicities on a single plane of consistency or exteriority, regardless of their number of dimensions.

== Use by Manuel DeLanda ==
In Manuel DeLanda's book Intensive Science and Virtual Philosophy, the line of flight is described as an operator which transcends the actual and ascends to the virtual. It is used as a synonym with Deleuze's terms "dark precursor" (from his book Difference and Repetition (1968)), "desiring machine" and "quasi-cause" (both from the first volume of Capitalism and Schizophrenia, Anti-Œdipus (1972)).

== Sources ==
- Deleuze, Gilles and Félix Guattari. 1972. Anti-Œdipus. Trans. Robert Hurley, Mark Seem and Helen R. Lane. London and New York: Continuum, 2004. Vol. 1 of Capitalism and Schizophrenia. 2 vols. 1972-1980. Trans. of L'Anti-Oedipe. Paris: Les Editions de Minuit. ISBN 0-8264-7695-3.
- ---. 1975. Kafka: Towards a Minor Literature. Trans. Dana Polan. Theory and History of Literature 30. Minneapolis and London: U of Minnesota P, 1986. Trans. of Kafka: Pour une literature mineure. Paris: Les Editions de Minuit. ISBN 0-8166-1515-2.
- ---. 1980. A Thousand Plateaus. Trans. Brian Massumi. London and New York: Continuum, 2004. Vol. 2 of Capitalism and Schizophrenia. 2 vols. 1972-1980. Trans. of Mille Plateaux. Paris: Les Editions de Minuit. ISBN 0-8264-7694-5.
- Guattari, Félix. 1984. Molecular Revolution: Psychiatry and Politics. Trans. Rosemary Sheed. Harmondsworth: Penguin. ISBN 0-14-055160-3.
- ---. 1992. Chaosmosis: An Ethico-Aesthetic Paradigm. Trans. Paul Bains and Julian Pefanis. Bloomington and Indianapolis: Indiana UP, 1995. Trans. of Chaosmose. Paris: Editions Galilee. ISBN 0-909952-25-6.
- ---. 1995. Chaosophy. Ed. Sylvère Lotringer. Semiotext(e) Foreign Agents Ser. New York: Semiotext(e). ISBN 1-57027-019-8.
- ---. 1996. Soft Subversions. Ed. Sylvère Lotringer. Trans. David L. Sweet and Chet Wiener. Semiotext(e) Foreign Agents Ser. New York: Semiotext(e). ISBN 1-57027-030-9.
- Massumi, Brian. 1992. A User's Guide to Capitalism and Schizophrenia: Deviations from Deleuze and Guattari. Swerve editions. Cambridge, USA and London: MIT. ISBN 0-262-63143-1.
