= Desiring-production =

Concept in philosophy

Desiring-production (French: production désirante) is a concept developed by the French thinkers Gilles Deleuze and Félix Guattari in their book Anti-Oedipus (1972).

== Overview ==
In opposition to the perceived idealism and repressive tendencies of Freudian theory, Deleuze and Guattari set out to describe a renewed framework of desire, incorporating both philosophical and psychoanalytic perspectives towards forming a "materialist psychiatry."

Deleuze and Guattari's conception of desire (similar to Immanuel Kant's) sees it as a productive force, as opposed to the more common conception of desire as 'wanting something due to lack of something'. They write of this Kantian conception of 'desire-as-producer' and the classic conception of desire as 'wanting due to lack' in the words: "To a certain degree, the traditional logic of desire is all wrong from the very outset: from the very first step that the Platonic logic of desire forces us to take, making us choose between production and acquisition. From the moment that we place desire on the side of acquisition, we make desire an idealistic (dialectical, nihilistic) conception, which causes us to look upon it as primarily a lack: a lack of an object, a lack of the real object. It is true that the other side, the 'production' side, has not been entirely ignored. Kant, for instance, must be credited with effecting a critical revolution as regards the theory of desire, by attributing to it 'the faculty of being, through its representations, the cause of the reality of the objects of these representations.' But it is not by chance that Kant chooses superstitious beliefs, hallucinations, and fantasies as illustrations of this definition of desire: as Kant would have it, we are well aware that the real object can be produced only by an external causality and external mechanisms; nonetheless this knowledge does not prevent us from believing in the intrinsic power of desire to create its own object—if only in an unreal, hallucinatory, or delirious form or from representing this causality as stemming from within desire itself. The reality of the object, insofar as it is produced by desire, is thus a psychic reality. Hence it can be said that Kant's critical revolution changes nothing essential: this way of conceiving of productivity does not question the validity of the classical conception of desire as a lack; rather, it uses this conception as a support and a buttress, and merely examines its implications more carefully."

Deleuze and Guattari write, "[p]roduction as process overtakes all idealistic categories and constitutes a cycle whose relationship to desire is that of an immanent principle. That is why desiring-production is the principal concern of a materialist psychiatry, which conceives of and deals with the schizo as Homo natura."

Deleuze and Guattari explain the concept of process and its involvement in desire. "[E]verything is production: production of productions, of actions and of passions; productions of recording processes, of distributions and of co-ordinates that serve as points of reference; productions of consumptions, of sensual pleasures, of anxieties, and of pain. Everything is production, since the recording processes are immediately consumed, immediately consummated, and these consumptions directly reproduced. This is the first meaning of process as we use the term: incorporating recording and consumption within production itself, thus making them the productions of one and the same process."

The concept of desiring-production is linked to the theory of desiring-machines and their processes (cf. Process ontology). Deleuze and Guattari portray the concept of desiring-machines through the example of Lenz's stroll, a narrative exemplifying schizophrenic experience.

"Everywhere it is machines — real ones, not figurative ones: machines driving other machines, machines being driven by other machines, with all the necessary couplings and connections. [...] A schizophrenic out for a walk is a better model than a neurotic lying on the analyst's couch [...] This walk outdoors is different from the moments when Lenz finds himself closeted with his pastor, who forces him to situate himself socially, in relationship to the God of established religion, in relationship to his father, to his mother. While taking a stroll outdoors, on the other hand, he is in the mountains, amid falling snowflakes, with other gods or without any gods at all, without a family, without a father or a mother, with nature. "What does my father want? Can he offer me more than that? Impossible. Leave me in peace." Everything is a machine. Celestial machines, the stars or rainbows in the sky, alpine machines — all of them connected to those of his body."

For Deleuze and Guattari, schizophrenic experience exemplifies an encounter with the immanent and productive reality of the universe. Schizophrenic experience is also detailed to emerge prior to the distinction of the universe into separate systems or structures of production: such as nature, man, industry, consumption, &c. Therefore, schizophrenic encounter reveals "the real truth of the matter — the glaring, sober truth that resides in delirium — [...] that there is no such thing as relatively independent spheres or circuits: production is immediately consumption and a recording process without any sort of mediation. [...] What the schizophrenic experiences, both as an individual and as a member of the human species, is not at all any one specific aspect of nature, but nature as a process of production. [...] Even within society, this characteristic man-nature, industry-nature, society-nature relationship is responsible for the distinction of relatively autonomous spheres that are called production, distribution, consumption."

Desiring production is also linked to a denial of the "man-nature" distinction. "[W]e make no distinction between man and nature: the human essence of nature and the natural essence of man become one within nature in the form of production or industry, just as they do within the life of man as a species. Industry is then no longer considered from the extrinsic point of view of utility, but rather from the point of view of its fundamental identity with nature as production of man and by man. [...] This is the second meaning of process as we use the term: man and nature are not like two opposite terms confronting each other [...] rather, they are one and the same essential reality, the producer-product." Desire is prior to conscious representations, operating at the level of the unconscious, "[t]he power of the machine, is that one cannot ultimately distinguish the unconscious subject of desire from the order of the machine itself."

Philosophically, desiring-production is a granular and fuzzy concept. In Deleuze and Guattari's work, the "machine" is linked to many descriptive terms. For example: celibate-machine(s), house-machine(s), organ-machine(s), celestial machine(s), alpine machine(s), photosynthesis-machine(s), &c., appear in their work. These descriptive terms qualify the underlying thematic focus of process ontology and desiring-production. As Deleuze and Guattari write, "Something is produced: the effects of a machine, not mere metaphors."

Desiring-production is also a component of Deleuze and Guattari's more general appropriation of pluralism and the will to power doctrine. In both frameworks, a force of appropriation of external functionalities or entities — "partial objects" — acts with a corresponding internal multiplicity, serving to characterise the process of life and reality against molar structures of representation and castration. Deleuze and Guattari write, "[p]artial objects are what make up the parts of the desiring-machines; partial objects define the working machine or the working parts, but in a state of dispersion such that one part is continually referring to a part from an entirely different machine, [...] Let's not rush to introduce a term that would be like a phallus structuring the whole and personifying the parts, unifying and totalizing everything. Everywhere there is libido as machine energy, and neither the horn nor the bumble bee have the privilege of being a phallus: the phallus intervenes only in the structural organization and the personal relations deriving from it, where everyone, like the worker called to war, abandons his machines and sets to fighting for a war trophy that is nothing but a great absence, with one and the same penalty, one and the same ridiculous wound for all — castration. This entire struggle for the phallus, this poorly understood will to power, this anthropomorphic representation of sex, this whole conception of sexuality that horrifies Lawrence precisely because it is no more than a conception, because it is an idea that "reason" imposes on the unconscious and introduces into the passional sphere, and is not by any means a formation of this sphere — here is where desire finds itself trapped, specifically limited to human sex, unified and identified in the molar constellation."

While interested in Wilhelm Reich's fundamental question — why did the masses desire fascism? — Deleuze and Guattari also maintain criticism of his dualist theory, which implies a rational social reality on one side, and an irrational libidinal reality on another. Anti Oedipus therefore attempts to think beyond the Freudo-Marxist framework. Hardt has suggested that Desiring-production is a social or cosmological ontology. Foucault, however, has suggested against using such a model for general and systematic claims. Also published in the same year as Anti Oedipus, Guy Hocquenghem's Homosexual Desire re-articulated the theory of desiring-production within the emergent field of queer theory.

== See also ==
- Erewhon
- Plane of immanence
- Reterritorialization

== Sources ==
- Deleuze, Gilles and Félix Guattari. 1972. Anti-Œdipus. Trans. Robert Hurley, Mark Seem and Helen R. Lane. London and New York: Continuum, 2004. Vol. 1 of Capitalism and Schizophrenia. 2 vols. 1972-1980. Trans. of L'Anti-Oedipe. Paris: Les Editions de Minuit. ISBN 0-8264-7695-3.
- ---. 1980. A Thousand Plateaus. Trans. Brian Massumi. London and New York: Continuum, 2004. Vol. 2 of Capitalism and Schizophrenia. 2 vols. 1972-1980. Trans. of Mille Plateaux. Paris: Les Editions de Minuit. ISBN 0-8264-7694-5.
- Guattari, Félix. 1984. Molecular Revolution: Psychiatry and Politics. Trans. Rosemary Sheed. Harmondsworth: Penguin. ISBN 0-14-055160-3.
- ---. 1995. Chaosophy. Ed. Sylvère Lotringer. Semiotext(e) Foreign Agents Ser. New York: Semiotext(e). ISBN 1-57027-019-8.
- ---. 1996. Soft Subversions. Ed. Sylvère Lotringer. Trans. David L. Sweet and Chet Wiener. Semiotext(e) Foreign Agents Ser. New York: Semiotext(e). ISBN 1-57027-030-9.
- Hocquenghem, Guy. 1972. Homosexual Desire. Trans. Daniella Dangoor. 2nd ed. Series Q Ser. Durham: Duke UP, 1993. ISBN 0-8223-1384-7.
- Massumi, Brian. 1992. A User's Guide to Capitalism and Schizophrenia: Deviations from Deleuze and Guattari. Swerve editions. Cambridge, USA and London: MIT. ISBN 0-262-63143-1.
- Holland, Eugene W. 1999. Deleuze and Guattari's Anti-Oedipus: Introduction to Schizoanalysis. New York: Routledge. ISBN 978-0-415-11318-2.
