= What Is Philosophy? (Deleuze and Guattari book) =

Book by Gilles Deleuze and Felix Guattari

What is Philosophy?
- Cover of the first edition
- Authors: Gilles Deleuze; Félix Guattari
- Original title: Qu'est-ce que la philosophie?
- Translators: Hugh Tomlinson; Graham Burchell
- Language: French
- Subjects: Metaphilosophy
- Published: 1991 (Les éditions de Minuit, in French); 1994 (Columbia University Press, in English)
- Publication place: France
- Media type: Print (Hardcover and Paperback)
- Pages: 256 (1996 Columbia University Press edition)
- ISBN: 978-0231079891

What is Philosophy? (French: Qu'est-ce que la philosophie ?) is a 1991 book by the philosopher Gilles Deleuze and the psychoanalyst Félix Guattari. The two had met shortly after May 1968 and collaborated most notably on Capitalism & Schizophrenia (Volume 1: Anti-Oedipus (1972); Volume 2: A Thousand Plateaus 1980) and Kafka: Towards a Minority Literature (1975). In this, the last book they co-signed, philosophy, science, and art are treated as three modes of thought.

== Background and concepts ==
Deleuze commented in a letter to one of his translators that his purpose in writing What is Philosophy? was to address "the problem of absolute immanence" and to explain why he considered Baruch Spinoza the "prince of philosophers." What is Philosophy? is concerned with, among the concepts that the book explores, the plane of immanence, conceptual personae, geophilosophy, functives, prospects, affects, percepts and chaos, as well as concepts in themselves understood as basic components of philosophy.

In a review of the translation of François Dosse's biography of Deleuze & Guattari, Adam Shatz writes that while it was Deleuze alone who wrote their final collaboration, the ideas of his longtime friend were still very much present in this "uncharacteristically sombre and subdued[,]" but "lyrical" book. Mathias Schönher holds that What is Philosophy? is Deleuze and Guattari's last book jointly written. As evidence he cites the drafts and working notes from the Guattari Collection at the archives of the Institute for Contemporary Publishing Archives (IMEC).

== Reception ==
=== Mainstream media ===
What is Philosophy? received a mixed review from Leon H. Brody in Library Journal. The book was also reviewed by John Rajchman in Artforum, Christopher Stanley in The Times Higher Education Supplement, and the philosopher Paul R. Patton in The Times Literary Supplement, and discussed by Adam Shatz in a review of a biography of the two men.

Brody credited Deleuze and Guattari with "singular insights" into the nature of philosophy and the distinction between it and other disciplines, but believed that because of the way the book was written it was unclear whether their conclusions were correct or their views were fully intelligible.

=== Academic reception ===
What is Philosophy? was reviewed by M. R. Loudon in the British Journal of Educational Studies. Other discussions include those by Stephen Arnott in Philosophy Today, Isabelle Stengers in Angelaki, Vikki Bell in Theory, Culture & Society, Hanneke Grottenboer in Oxford Art Journal, Daniel W. Smith in Parallax, Ted Striphas in Text and Performance Quarterly, David R. Cole in Educational Philosophy & Theory, Henning Schmidgen in Theory, Culture & Society, and Mathias Schönher in Theory, Culture & Society.

Stuhr, writing in The Journal of Aesthetics and Art Criticism, described the book as important, highly original, and challenging. He praised Deleuze and Guattari's discussions of the nature of concepts and the relationship of philosophy to science and art. Plotnitsky defended the book against criticism from Alan Sokal and Jean Bricmont in Paragraph. Smith wrote that Deleuze and Guattari's definition of philosophy was famous. Schmidgen argued that philosophy and science did not have such clearly distinct purposes as Deleuze and Guattari maintained.

=== Criticism ===
In a chapter of Fashionable Nonsense, Sokal and Bricmont object to the use of scientific terms such as "chaos" in meaningless or misleading ways. They list a number of occurrences of what they deem to be "pseudo-scientific language".

== See also ==
- Immanence
- Metaphilosophy
