= Deleuze and Guattari =

Collaboration between two French intellectuals (1972–1991)

Gilles Deleuze, a French philosopher, and Félix Guattari, a French psychoanalyst and political activist, wrote a number of works together. Their conjoint works included Capitalism and Schizophrenia (Vol 1. Anti-Oedipus, Vol 2. A Thousand Plateaus), Kafka: Toward a Minor Literature, and What Is Philosophy?

== Publications ==
=== Capitalism and Schizophrenia ===
A two volume work, consisting of Anti-Oedipus (1972) and A Thousand Plateaus (1980), Capitalism and Schizophrenia was an influential success; and, with its critique of psychoanalytic conformity, marked a significant step in the evolution of post-structuralism. Its emphasis on the nomadic nature of knowledge and identity, as seen for example in the authors' stress on the continuities between the human and the animal, also places it among the formative texts of postmodernism. Stark and Laurie argue that Anti-Oedipus also "responded to the failures of Marxist revolutionary movements to purge themselves of the vices they were seeking to overthrow, including prejudice, dogmatism, nationalism and hierarchies of power".

Foucault in his preface to the first volume called it "a book of ethics, the first book of ethics to be written in France in quite a long time". Fredric Jameson praised it for re-introducing the flux of history into the static world of structuralism.

The book's celebration of the anoedipal has also been seen as sketching a strategy for survival under the capitalism of late modernity.

=== Kafka ===
Unhappy with the treatment of Franz Kafka’s work by scholars, Deleuze and Guattari wrote Kafka: Toward a Minor Literature in order to attack previous analyses of Kafka which they saw as limiting him either "by oedipalizing and relating him to mother-father narratives—or by trying to limit him to theological-metaphysical speculation to the detriment of all the political, ethical, and ideological dimensions that run through his work".

Published in 1975, their book sought to enter Kafka’s works through deliberately imprecise analytical modes such as flow and intensity, without the unnecessary burden of the type of analysis that relates works to past or existing categories of genre, type, mode, or style. The latter sort of analysis is related to what Deleuze and Guattari would call the "Major" or dominant literature, out of which they see Kafka emerging as a voice of a marginalized, minority people re-appropriating the major language for his own purposes, and stressing collective forces over the individual "literary master".

=== Nomadology: The War Machine ===
This work, published in English translation in 1986 and included in the English translation of A Thousand Plateaus in 1987, originally appeared in French as Traité de nomadologie : La machine de guerre. The work contrasts the "war machine" with the state. It outlines the structure of "nomad science"—which is analogized to topology and differential calculus as operating in smooth space—in opposition to "royal science". Nomads exist exterior to the state and work to resist state formation. Nomads naturally produce the war machine, which is then appropriated by states in order to achieve their aims.

=== What is Philosophy? ===
Deleuze and Guattari also wrote What Is Philosophy? (1991) together. The work draws from David Hume in order to construct a view of philosophy as both based on experience and a quasi-virtual world.

== Personal/political ==
Guattari has described how his collaboration with Deleuze arose out of the aftermath of the May 1968 events in France, as well as the additional energy generated in his writings by the collaboration.

== Criticisms ==
In addition to criticisms of contemporary misapplications of Deleuze and Guattari's ideas, philosophical critiques have been made of Deleuze and Guattari's anti-Hegelianism and their "fraternal" imaginaries. Commenting on the relationship between anthropology and politics in Anti-Oedipus, Timothy Laurie noted that "Deleuze and Guattari fall back on a methodological dogma that aligns femininity with reproduction and masculinity with politics and/or the primordial 'male bond'".

== See also ==
- Anti-psychiatry
- Deterritorialization
- Rhizome
- Schizoanalysis
