= La Borde Clinic =

Psychiatric clinic in France

Coordinates: 47.533°N 1.4629°E

The La Borde Clinic (French: [la bɔʁd]; French: Clinique de la Borde), also known as the Cour-Cheverny Clinic (Clinique de Cour-Cheverny), is a psychiatric clinic that opened in 1953 in the town of Cour-Cheverny in the Loire Valley of France. Still in operation as of August 2023, the La Borde Clinic is a model in institutional psychotherapy, with citizens actively participating in running it.

== History ==
The clinic was founded by Jean Oury, a psychiatrist who previously worked in experimental therapy at the psychiatric clinic of Saint-Alban. The psychiatric practice borrowed the idea of Hermann Simon that it is necessary to look after the establishment and to look after each citizen, while returning initiative and responsibility to them by developing situations in which they can work and express their creativity. According to its constitution written by Oury, La Borde was founded on three principles: democratic centralism, a rotating basis for the division of labor, and anti-bureaucracy.

From the mid-50s Félix Guattari worked at La Borde, developing its practice and organization and producing alongside Oury a body of theoretical work on the practice and theory of schizoanalysis, set in practice at La Borde, and included in his 1972 collaboration with the philosopher Gilles Deleuze, Anti-Œdipus.

Among the many aspects of La Borde is the annual summer tradition in which the "boarders" and staff work together to perform a play. Nicolas Philibert, the documentary film-maker, made a documentary set at La Borde entitled Every Little Thing (French La Moindre des choses). The film was released in 1997 and follows the citizens and staff staging their production of Operette by Witold Gombrowicz.

== La Borde today ==
The La Borde Clinic was run by Jean Oury until his death in 2014. Its capacity is 107 beds, and it now includes a so-called day hospital structure with 15 places.

La Borde is known for its plays put on every summer by both residents and caregivers. Nicolas Philibert made a film of it entitled La Moindre des choses, released in theaters in March 1997.

A screening session dedicated to La Borde, in the presence of Jean-Claude Polack (psychiatrist and psychoanalyst and director of publication of the schizoanalysis journal Chimères) and the director François Pain was organized on January 14, 2009, at the Le Méliès cinema in Montreuil by the film programming structure The Missing People.

== See also ==
- Loir-et-Cher Departmental Asylum

== Sources ==
- Deleuze, Gilles and Félix Guattari. 1972. Anti-Œdipus. Trans. Robert Hurley, Mark Seem and Helen R. Lane. London and New York: Continuum, 2004. Vol. 1 of Capitalism and Schizophrenia. 2 vols. 1972-1980. Trans. of L'Anti-Oedipe. Paris: Les Editions de Minuit. ISBN 0-8264-7695-3.
- Guattari, Félix. 1984. Molecular Revolution: Psychiatry and Politics. Trans. Rosemary Sheed. Harmondsworth: Penguin. ISBN 0-14-055160-3.
- Caló, Susana (2016) 'The Grid', Axiomatic Earth, Tecnosphere Issue, Anthropocene Curriculum & Campus, House of World Cultures (HKW).
