= Anti-Oedipus =

1972 book by Deleuze and Guattari

Anti-Oedipus: Capitalism and Schizophrenia
- Cover of the first edition
- Authors: Gilles Deleuze; Félix Guattari
- Original title: Capitalisme et schizophrénie L'anti-Œdipe
- Translators: Robert Hurley; Mark Seem; Helen R. Lane
- Language: French
- Subject: Capitalism, schizoanalysis
- Publisher: Les Éditions de Minuit, Viking Penguin
- Publication date: 1972
- Publication place: France
- English publication date: 1977
- Media type: Print (Hardcover and Paperback)
- Pages: 494 (French edition); 400 (University of Minnesota Press edition)
- ISBN: 0-8166-1225-0 (University of Minnesota Press edition)
- Followed by: A Thousand Plateaus (1980)

Anti-Oedipus: Capitalism and Schizophrenia (French: Capitalisme et schizophrénie. L'anti-Œdipe) is a 1972 book by French authors Gilles Deleuze and Félix Guattari, the former a philosopher and the latter a psychoanalyst. It is the first volume of their collaborative work Capitalism and Schizophrenia (1972), the second being A Thousand Plateaus (1980).

In the book, Deleuze and Guattari critique contemporary French uses of psychoanalysis and historical materialism by repurposing their concepts in the development of schizoanalysis, a loose critical practice initiated from the standpoint of schizophrenia and psychosis as well as from the social progress that capitalism has spurred. Schizoanalysis is described as a "materialist psychiatry" modeled on the unconscious regarded as an aggregate of productive processes of desire, incorporating their concept of desiring-production which interrelates desiring-machines and bodies without organs, to detail their different organizations of social production, "recording surfaces", coding, territorialization and the act of "inscription". They refer to psychoanalysis, economics, the creative arts, literature, anthropology and history in engagement with these concepts.

Friedrich Nietzsche's ideas of the will to power and eternal recurrence also have roles in how Deleuze and Guattari describe schizophrenia; the book extends from much of Deleuze's prior thinking in Difference and Repetition and The Logic of Sense that utilized Nietzsche's ideas to explore a radical conception of becoming. Deleuze and Guattari also draw on and criticize the philosophies and theories of: Spinoza, Kant, Charles Fourier, Charles Sanders Peirce, Carl Jung, Melanie Klein, Karl Jaspers, Lewis Mumford, Karl August Wittfogel, Wilhelm Reich, Georges Bataille, Louis Hjelmslev, Jacques Lacan, Gregory Bateson, Pierre Klossowski, Claude Lévi-Strauss, Jacques Monod, Louis Althusser, Victor Turner, Jean Oury, Jean-François Lyotard, Michel Foucault, Frantz Fanon, R. D. Laing, David Cooper, and Pierre Clastres.

They additionally draw on authors and artists whose works demonstrate their concept of schizophrenia as "the universe of productive and reproductive desiring-machines", such as Antonin Artaud, Samuel Beckett, Georg Büchner, Samuel Butler, D. H. Lawrence, Henry Miller, Marcel Proust, Arthur Rimbaud, Daniel Paul Schreber, Adolf Wölfli, Vaslav Nijinsky, Gérard de Nerval and J. M. W. Turner.

Thus, given the richness and diversity of the source material it draws upon and the grand task it sets out to accomplish, Anti-Oedipus can, as Michel Foucault suggests in the preface to the text, "best be read as an 'art,'" and it would be a "mistake to read [it] as the new theoretical reference" in philosophy.

Anti-Oedipus became a sensation upon publication and was widely celebrated, creating shifts in contemporary philosophy. It is seen as a key text in the "micropolitics of desire", alongside Lyotard's Libidinal Economy. It has been credited with devastating Lacanianism due to its unorthodox criticism of the movement.

== Summary ==
=== Schizoanalysis ===
Deleuze and Guattari argue that Richard Lindner's painting Boy with Machine (1954) demonstrates the schizoanalytic thesis of the primacy of desire's social investments over its familial ones: "the turgid little boy has already plugged a desiring-machine into a social machine, short-circuiting the parents."

Deleuze and Guattari's "schizoanalysis" is a social and political analysis that responds to what they see as the reactionary tendencies of psychoanalysis. It proposes a functional evaluation of the direct investments of desire—whether revolutionary or reactionary—in a field that is social, biological, historical, and geographical. Deleuze and Guattari develop four theses of schizoanalysis:

1. Every unconscious libidinal investment is social and bears upon a socio-historical field.
2. Unconscious libidinal investments of group or desire are distinct from preconscious investments of class or interest.
3. Non-familial libidinal investments of the social field are primary in relation to familial investments.
4. Social libidinal investments are distinguished according to two poles: a paranoiac, reactionary, fascisizing pole and a schizoid revolutionary pole.

In contrast to the psychoanalytic conception, schizoanalysis assumes that the libido does not need to be de-sexualised, sublimated, or to go by way of metamorphoses in order to invest economic or political factors. "The truth is," Deleuze and Guattari explain, "sexuality is everywhere: the way a bureaucrat fondles his records, a judge administers justice, a businessman causes money to circulate; the way the bourgeoisie fucks the proletariat; and so on. [...] Flags, nations, armies, banks get a lot of people aroused." In the terms of classical Marxism, desire is part of the economic, infrastructural "base" of society, they argue, not an ideological, subjective "superstructure."

Unconscious libidinal investments of desire coexist without necessarily coinciding with preconscious investments made according to the needs or ideological interests of the subject (individual or collective) who desires.

A form of social production and reproduction, along with its economic and financial mechanisms, its political formations, and so on, can be desired as such, in whole or in part, independently of the interests of the desiring-subject. It was not by means of a metaphor, even a paternal metaphor, that Hitler was able to sexually arouse the fascists. It is not by means of a metaphor that a banking or stock-market transaction, a claim, a coupon, a credit, is able to arouse people who are not necessarily bankers. And what about the effects of money that grows, money that produces more money? There are socioeconomic "complexes" that are also veritable complexes of the unconscious, and that communicate a voluptuous wave from the top to the bottom of their hierarchy (the military–industrial complex). And ideology, Oedipus, and the phallus have nothing to do with this, because they depend on it rather than being its impetus.

Schizoanalysis seeks to show how "in the subject who desires, desire can be made to desire its own repression—whence the role of the death instinct in the circuit connecting desire to the social sphere." Desire produces "even the most repressive and the most deadly forms of social reproduction."

==== Desiring machines and social production ====
The traditional understanding of desire assumes an exclusive distinction between "production" and "acquisition." This line of thought—which has dominated Western philosophy throughout its history and stretches from Plato to Freud and Lacan—understands desire through the concept of acquisition, insofar as desire seeks to acquire something that it lacks. This dominant conception, Deleuze and Guattari argue, is a form of philosophical idealism. Alternative conceptions, which treat desire as a positive, productive force, have received far less attention; the ideas of the small number of philosophers who have developed them, however, are of crucial importance to Deleuze and Guattari's project: principally Nietzsche's will to power and Spinoza's conatus. Deleuze and Guattari argue that desire is a positive process of production that produces reality. On the basis of three "passive syntheses" (partly modelled on Kant's syntheses of apperception from his Critique of Pure Reason), desire engineers "partial objects, flows, and bodies" in the service of the autopoiesis of the unconscious. In this model, desire does not "lack" its object; instead, desire "is a machine, and the object of desire is another machine connected to it." On this basis, Deleuze and Guattari develop their notion of desiring-production. Since desire produces reality, social production, with its forces and relations, is "purely and simply desiring-production itself under determinate conditions."

Like their contemporary, R. D. Laing, and like Reich before them, Deleuze and Guattari make a connection between psychological repression and social oppression. By means of their concept of desiring-production, however, their manner of doing so is radically different. They describe a universe composed of desiring-machines, all of which are connected to one another: "There are no desiring-machines that exist outside the social machines that they form on a large scale; and no social machines without the desiring machines that inhabit them on a small scale." When they insist that a social field may be invested by desire directly, they oppose Freud's concept of sublimation, which posits an inherent dualism between desiring-machines and social production: "The truth is that sexuality is everywhere: the way a bureaucrat fondles his records, a judge administers justice, a businessman causes money to circulate; the way the bourgeoisie fucks the proletariat; and so on." This dualism, they argue, limited and trapped the revolutionary potential of the theories of Laing and Reich. Deleuze and Guattari develop a critique of Freud and Lacan's psychoanalysis, anti-psychiatry, and Freudo-Marxism (with its insistence on a necessary mediation between the two realms of desire and the social). Deleuze and Guattari's concept of sexuality is not limited to the interaction of male and female gender roles, but instead posits a multiplicity of flows that a "hundred thousand" desiring-machines create within their connected universe; Deleuze and Guattari contrast this "non-human, molecular sexuality" to "molar" binary sexuality: "making love is not just becoming as one, or even two, but becoming as a hundred thousand," they write, adding that "we always make love with worlds."

==== Reframing the Oedipal complex ====
The "anti-" part of their critique of the Freudian Oedipal complex begins with that original model's articulation of society based on the family triangle of father, mother and child. Criticizing psychoanalysis "familialism", they want to show that the oedipal model of the family is a kind of organization that must colonize its members, repress their desires, and give them complexes if it is to function as an organizing principle of society. Instead of conceiving the "family" as a sphere contained by a larger "social" sphere, and giving a logical preeminence to the family triangle, Deleuze and Guattari argue that the family should be opened onto the social, as in Bergson's conception of the Open, and that underneath the pseudo-opposition between family (composed of personal subjects) and social, lies the relationship between pre-individual desire and social production.

Furthermore, they argue that schizophrenia is an extreme mental state co-existent with the capitalist system itself and capitalism keeps enforcing neurosis as a way of maintaining normality. However, they oppose a non-clinical concept of "schizophrenia" as deterritorialization to the clinical end-result "schizophrenic" (i.e. they do not intend to romanticize "mental disorders"; instead, they show, like Foucault, that "psychiatric disorders" are always second to something else).

==== Body without organs ====
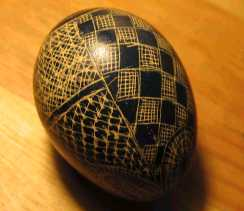
Deleuze and Guattari describe the BwO as an egg: "it is crisscrossed with axes and thresholds, with latitudes and longitudes and geodesic lines, traversed by gradients marking the transitions and the becomings, the destinations of the subject developing along these particular vectors."

Deleuze and Guattari develop their concept of the "body without organs" (often rendered as BwO) from Antonin Artaud's text "To Have Done With the Judgment of God". Since desire can take on as many forms as there are persons to implement it, it must seek new channels and different combinations to realize itself, forming a body without organs for every instance. Desire is not limited to the affections of a subject, nor the material state of the subject. Bodies without organs cannot be forced or willed into existence, however, and they are essentially the product of a zero-intensity condition that Deleuze and Guattari link to catatonic schizophrenia that also becomes "the model of death".

==== Criticism of psychoanalysts ====
Deleuze and Guattari address the case of Gérard Mendel, Bela Grunberger and Janine Chasseguet-Smirgel, who were prominent members of the most respected psychoanalytic association (the International Psychoanalytical Association). They argue that this case demonstrates that psychoanalysis enthusiastically embraces a police state:

As to those who refuse to be oedipalized in one form or another, at one end or the other in the treatment, the psychoanalyst is there to call the asylum or the police for help. The police on our side!—never did psychoanalysis better display its taste for supporting the movement of social repression, and for participating in it with enthusiasm. [...] notice of the dominant tone in the most respected associations: consider Dr. Mendel and the Drs Stéphane, the state of fury that is theirs, and their literally police-like appeal at the thought that someone might try to escape the Oedipal dragnet. Oedipus is one of those things that becomes all the more dangerous the less people believe in it; then the cops are there to replace the high priests.

Bela Grunberger and Janine Chasseguet-Smirgel were two psychoanalysts from the Paris section of the International Psychoanalytical Association. In November 1968 they disguised themselves under the pseudonym André Stéphane and published L'univers Contestationnaire, in which they argued that the left-wing rioters of May 68 were totalitarian stalinists, and proceeded to psychoanalyze them as having a sordid infantilism caught up in an Oedipal revolt against the Father. Jacques Lacan regarded Grunberger and Chasseguet-Smirgel's book with great disdain; while they were still disguised under the pseudonym, Lacan remarked that he was certain that neither author belonged to his school, as none would abase themselves to such low drivel. The IPa analysts responded with an accusation against the Lacan school of "intellectual terrorism." Gérard Mendel published La révolte contre le père (1968) and Pour décoloniser l'enfant (1971).

=== Fascism, the family, and the desire for oppression ===
==== Desiring self-repression ====
Deleuze and Guattari address a fundamental problem of political philosophy: the contradictory phenomenon whereby an individual or a group comes to desire their own oppression. This contradiction had been mentioned briefly by the 17th-century philosopher Spinoza: "Why do men fight for their servitude as stubbornly as though it were their salvation?" That is, how is it possible that people cry for "More taxes! Less bread!"? Wilhelm Reich discussed the phenomenon in his 1933 book The Mass Psychology of Fascism:

The astonishing thing is not that some people steal or that others occasionally go out on strike, but rather that all those who are starving do not steal as a regular practice, and all those who are exploited are not continually out on strike: after centuries of exploitation, why do people still tolerate being humiliated and enslaved, to such a point, indeed, that they actually want humiliation and slavery not only for others but for themselves?"

To address this question, Deleuze and Guattari examine the relationships between social organisation, power, and desire, particularly in relation to the Freudian "Oedipus complex" and its familial mechanisms of subjectivation ("daddy-mommy-me"). They argue that the nuclear family is the most powerful agent of psychological repression, under which the desires of the child and the adolescent are repressed and perverted. Such psychological repression forms docile individuals that are easy targets for social repression. By using this powerful mechanism, the dominant class, "making cuts (coupures) and segregations pass over into a social field", can ultimately control individuals or groups, ensuring general submission. This explains the contradictory phenomenon in which people "act manifestly counter to their class interests—when they rally to the interests and ideals of a class that their own objective situation should lead them to combat". Deleuze and Guattari's critique of these mechanisms seeks to promote a revolutionary liberation of desire:

If desire is repressed, it is because every position of desire, no matter how small, is capable of calling into question the established order of a society: not that desire is asocial, on the contrary. But it is explosive; there is no desiring-machine capable of being assembled without demolishing entire social sectors. Despite what some revolutionaries think about this, desire is revolutionary in its essence—desire, not left-wing holidays!—and no society can tolerate a position of real desire without its structures of exploitation, servitude, and hierarchy being compromised.

==== The family under capitalism as an agent of repression ====
The family is the agent to which capitalist production delegates the psychological repression of the desires of the child. Psychological repression is distinguished from social oppression insofar as it works unconsciously. Through it, Deleuze and Guattari argue, parents transmit their angst and irrational fears to their child and bind the child's sexual desires to feelings of shame and guilt. Psychological repression is strongly linked with social oppression, which levers on it. It is thanks to psychological repression that individuals are transformed into docile servants of social repression who come to desire self-repression and who accept a miserable life as employees for capitalism. A capitalist society needs a powerful tool to counteract the explosive force of desire, which has the potential to threaten its structures of exploitation, servitude, and hierarchy; the nuclear family is precisely the powerful tool able to counteract those forces.

The action of the family not only performs a psychological repression of desire, but it disfigures it, giving rise to a consequent neurotic desire, the perversion of incestuous drives and desiring self-repression. The Oedipus complex arises from this double operation: "It is in one and the same movement that the repressive social production is replaced by the repressing family, and that the latter offers a displaced image of desiring-production that represents the repressed as incestuous familial drives."

=== Capitalism and the political economy of desire ===
==== Territorialization, deterritorialization, and reterritorialization ====
Although (like most Deleuzo-Guattarian terms) deterritorialization has a purposeful variance in meaning throughout their oeuvre, it can be roughly described as a move away from a rigidly imposed hierarchical, arborescent context, which seeks to package things (concepts, objects, etc.) into discrete categorised units with singular coded meanings or identities, towards a rhizomatic zone of multiplicity and fluctuant identity, where meanings and operations flow freely between said things, resulting in a dynamic, constantly changing set of interconnected entities with fuzzy individual boundaries. Importantly, the concept implies a continuum, not a simple binary – every actual assemblage (a flexible term alluding to the heterogeneous composition of any complex system, individual, social, geological) is marked by simultaneous movements of territorialization (maintenance) and of deterritorialization (dissipation). Various means of deterritorializing are alluded to by the authors in their chapter "How to Make Yourself A Body Without Organs" in A Thousand Plateaus, including psychoactives such as peyote. Experientially, the effects of such substances can include a loosening (relative deterritorialization) of the worldview of the user (i.e. his/her beliefs, models, etc.), subsequently leading to an antiredeterritorialization (remapping of beliefs, models, etc.) that is not necessarily identical to the prior territory.

Deterritorialization is closely related to Deleuzo-Guattarian concepts such as line of flight, destratification and the body without organs/BwO (a term borrowed from Artaud), and is sometimes defined in such a way as to be partly interchangeable with these terms (most specifically in the second part of Capitalism and Schizophrenia, A Thousand Plateaus). Deleuze and Guattari posit that dramatic reterritorialization often follows relative deterritorialization, while absolute deterritorialization is just that... absolute deterritorialization without any reterritorialization.

=== Terminology borrowed from science ===
A vector field on a sphere

During the course of their argument, Deleuze and Guattari borrow a number of concepts from different scientific fields. To describe the process of desire, they draw on fluid dynamics, the branch of physics that studies how a fluid flows through space. They describe society in terms of forces acting in a vector field. They also relate processes of their "body without organs" to the embryology of an egg, from which they borrow the concept of an inductor.

== Reception and influence ==
The philosopher Michel Foucault wrote that Anti-Oedipus can best be read as an "art", in the sense that is conveyed by the term "erotic art." Foucault considered the book's three "adversaries" as the "bureaucrats of the revolution", the "poor technicians of desire" (psychoanalysts and semiologists), and "the major enemy", fascism. Foucault used the term "fascism" to refer "not only historical fascism, the fascism of Hitler and Mussolini...but also the fascism in us all, in our heads and in our everyday behavior, the fascism that causes us to love power, to desire the very thing that dominates and exploits us." Foucault added that Anti-Oedipus is "a book of ethics, the first book of ethics to be written in France in quite a long time", and suggested that this explains its popular success. Foucault proposed that the book could be called Introduction to the Non-Fascist Life. Foucault argued that putting the principles espoused in Anti-Oedipus into practice involves freeing political action from "unitary and totalizing paranoia" and withdrawing allegiance "from the old categories of the Negative (law, limit, castration, lack, lacuna), which western thought has so long held sacred as a form of power and an access to reality."

The psychiatrist David Cooper described Anti-Oedipus as "a magnificent vision of madness as a revolutionary force", crediting its authors with using "the psychoanalytic language and the discourse of Saussure (and his successors)" to pit "linguistics against itself in what is already proving to be an historic act of depassment." The critic Frederick Crews wrote that when Deleuze and Guattari "indicted Lacanian psychoanalysis as a capitalist disorder" and "pilloried analysts as the most sinister priest-manipulators of a psychotic society", their "demonstration was widely regarded as unanswerable" and "devastated the already shrinking Lacanian camp in Paris." The philosopher Douglas Kellner described Anti-Oedipus as its era's publishing sensation, and, along with Jean-François Lyotard's Libidinal Economy (1974), a key text in "the micropolitics of desire." The psychoanalyst Joel Kovel wrote that Deleuze and Guattari provided a definitive challenge to the mystique of the family, but that they did so in the spirit of nihilism, commenting, "Immersion in their world of 'schizoculture' and desiring machines is enough to make a person yearn for the secure madness of the nuclear family."

Anthony Elliott described Anti-Oedipus as a "celebrated" work that "scandalized French psychoanalysis and generated heated dispute among intellectuals" and "offered a timely critique of psychoanalysis and Lacanianism at the time of its publication in France". However, he added that most commentators would now agree that "schizoanalysis" is fatally flawed, and that there are several major objections that can be made against Anti-Oedipus. In his view, even if "subjectivity may be usefully decentred and deconstructed", it is wrong to assume that "desire is naturally rebellious and subversive." He believed that Deleuze and Guattari see the individual as "no more than various organs, intensities and flows, rather than a complex, contradictory identity" and make false emancipatory claims for schizophrenia. He also argued that Deleuze and Guattari's work produces difficulties for the interpretation of contemporary culture, because of their "rejection of institutionality as such", which obscures the difference between liberal democracy and fascism and leaves Deleuze and Guattari with "little more than a romantic, idealized fantasy of the 'schizoid hero'". He wrote that Anti-Oedipus follows a similar theoretical direction to Lyotard's Libidinal Economy, though he sees several significant differences between Deleuze and Guattari on the one hand and Lyotard on the other.

Some of Guattari's diary entries, correspondence with Deleuze, and notes on the development of the book were published posthumously as The Anti-Oedipus Papers (2004). The philosopher Mikkel Borch-Jacobsen and the psychologist Sonu Shamdasani wrote that rather than having their confidence shaken by the "provocations and magnificent rhetorical violence" of Anti-Oedipus, the psychoanalytic profession felt that the debates raised by the book legitimated their discipline. Joshua Ramey wrote that while the passage into Deleuze and Guattari's "body without organs" is "fraught with danger and even pain ... the point of Anti-Oedipus is not to make glamorous that violence or that suffering. Rather, the point is to show that there is a viable level of Dinoysian [sic] experience." The philosopher Alan D. Schrift wrote in The Cambridge Dictionary of Philosophy (2015) that Anti-Oedipus was "read as a major articulation of the philosophy of desire and a profound critique of psychoanalysis."

== See also ==
- Accelerationism
- Antipsychiatry
- Feminism and the Oedipus complex
- Id, ego, and super-ego
- La Borde clinic
- Plane of immanence
- Psychoanalytic conceptions of language
- Psychological repression
- Schizoanalysis

== Sources ==
- Deleuze, Gilles. 2004. Desert Islands and Other Texts, 1953–1974. Trans. Michael Taormina. Ed. David Lapoujade. Semiotext(e) Foreign Agents ser. Los Angeles and New York: Semiotext(e). ISBN 1-58435-018-0.
- Deleuze, Gilles and Michel Foucault. 1972. "Intellectuals and Power." In Deleuze (2004, 206–213).
- Deleuze, Gilles and Félix Guattari. 1972. Anti-Oedipus. Trans. Robert Hurley, Mark Seem and Helen R. Lane. London and New York: Continuum, 2004. Vol. 1 of Capitalism and Schizophrenia. 2 vols. 1972–1980. Trans. of L'Anti-Oedipe. Paris: Les Editions de Minuit. ISBN 0-8264-7695-3. Preview available on Google Books
- ---. 1980. A Thousand Plateaus. Trans. Brian Massumi. London and New York: Continuum, 2004. Vol. 2 of Capitalism and Schizophrenia. 2 vols. 1972–1980. Trans. of Mille Plateaux. Paris: Les Editions de Minuit. ISBN 0-8264-7694-5.
- Foucault, Michel. 1977. Preface. In Deleuze and Guattari (1972, xiii–xvi).
- Guattari, Félix. 1992. Chaosmosis: An Ethico-Aesthetic Paradigm. Trans. Paul Bains and Julian Pefanis. Bloomington and Indianapolis: Indiana UP, 1995. Trans. of Chaosmose. Paris: Éditions Galilée. ISBN 0-909952-25-6.
- ---. 2004 The Anti-Oedipus Papers. Ed. Stéphane Nadaud. Trans. Kélina Gotman. New York: Semiotext(e), 2006. ISBN 1-58435-031-8.
- Holland, Eugene W. 1999. Deleuze and Guattari's Anti-Oedipus: Introduction to Schizoanalysis. London and New York: Routledge. ISBN 0-415-11319-9.
- Seem, Mark. 1977. Introduction. In Deleuze and Guattari (1972, xvii–xxvi).
