= The Anti-Oedipus Papers =

Notes by Félix Guattari (1969-1973)

The Anti-Œdipus Papers
- Cover of the 2006 edition
- Editor: Stéphane Nadaud
- Author: Félix Guattari
- Translator: Kélina Gotman
- Language: French
- Subjects: Psychoanalysis; Philosophy
- Published: March 2006
- Publisher: Semiotext(e)
- Publication place: France
- Media type: Print (Paperback)
- Pages: 384
- ISBN: 9781584350316

The Anti-Œdipus Papers is a collection of journal entries and notes written between 1969 and 1973 by the French philosopher and psychotherapist Félix Guattari. Guattari addressed these notes to Gilles Deleuze while preparing for their 1972 work Anti-Oedipus.

As a whole, the papers serve to expand upon, and propose their own, psychoanalytic theory; they are supplemented by journal entries explaining the relationships between Guattari and many of his companions, including Deleuze, Jacques Lacan, and Jean Oury.
