= Reterritorialization =

Philosophical concept

Reterritorialization (French: reterritorialisation) is the restructuring of a place or territory that has experienced deterritorialization. Deterritorialization is a term created by Deleuze and Guattari in their philosophical project Capitalism and Schizophrenia (1972–1980). They distinguished that relative deterritorialization is always accompanied by reterritorialization. It is the design of the new power. For example, when the Spanish (Hernán Cortés) conquered the Aztecs, and after the Spanish deterritorialized by eliminating the symbols of the Aztecs' beliefs and rituals, the Spanish then reterritorialized by putting up their own beliefs and rituals. This form of propaganda established their takeover of the land. Propaganda is an attempt to reterritorialize by influencing people's ideas through information distributed on a large scale. For example, during World War I, the U.S. put up posters everywhere to encourage young men to join the military and fight.

== Use in anthropology ==
Reterritorialization is when people within a place start to produce an aspect of popular culture themselves, doing so in the context of their local culture and making it their own. An example would be the Indonesian Hip Hop. Although hip hop and rap grew out of the inner cities of New York City and Los Angeles during the 1980s and 1990s, by the time it reached Indonesia through Europe and Central Asia, it had already lost some of its original characteristics. Imported hip hop diffused first to a small group of people in Indonesia; then, Indonesians began to create hip hop music. Although the music was hip hop, the local artists integrated their local culture with the practises of the “foreign” hip hop to create a hybrid that was no longer foreign.

Most current work in human geography uses anthropological definitions of culture and often views the practice associated with popular culture as cultural expressions that may reveal or create aspects of place, space landscape, and identity. The continuous cycles of deterritorialization and reterritorialization through axiomatization makes up one of the basic rhythms of capitalist society. Karl Marx referred to this as the constant revolution of the means of production and uninterrupted disturbances of all social conditions that distinguish the bourgeois era from all the previous. The fundamental mechanism of capital accompanies the process of deterritorialization and reterritorialization. It conjoins deterritorialized resources and appropriates the surplus from their reterritorialized conjunction.

Deterritorialization and reterritorialization presuppose and reinforce the notice of a common essence of desire and labor. This refers to the detachment and reattachment of the energies of production in general of investments of all kinds, whether conventionally considered psychological or economical.

Kataria (2019), in his work on 'Re-territorialization of persecuted identity', examines 're-territorialization' as an expression of refugees who try to re-establish a territorial connection after their arrival in their host societies, a process which tends to ignite ethno-national conflict with outgroups.

== Mass media ==
Since the introduction of the mass media, reterritorialization has become more prevalent. The mass media have expedited the process of deterritorialization and reterritorialization and allowed it to occur at a global level. Communications technology has connected the entire world and, in a sense, created a global culture that encompasses everyone who has access to these communications technologies. Anyone who has the internet is part of this culturally diffused community. Once a local culture is part of the global community the process of deterritorialization and reterritorialization continues as the global culture takes from and feeds to all the communities that take part in it. A pop culture example that comments on global reterritorialization is the song "Californication" by the Red Hot Chili Peppers. The song is about how California's culture influences the world; a trend that is picked up in California will likely be picked up everywhere in the global community. One of the final verses of the song mentions the destruction that takes place during deterritorialization, but how that opens up the opportunity for reterritorialization: “Destruction leads to a very rough road but it also breeds creation, and earthquakes are to a girl's guitar, they're just another good vibration, and tidal waves couldn't save the world from Californication.” These lyrics capture the essence of reterritorialization at a global level. California is, in a sense, a cultural node in the global community; a place where international trends begin. Deterritorialization and reterritorialization are a continuous part of the evolution of the global culture, and the mass media is its catalyst.

== Sources ==
- Deleuze, Gilles and Félix Guattari. 1972. Anti-Œdipus. Trans. Robert Hurley, Mark Seem and Helen R. Lane. London and New York: Continuum, 2004. Vol. 1 of Capitalism and Schizophrenia. 2 vols. 1972-1980. Trans. of L'Anti-Oedipe. Paris: Les Editions de Minuit. ISBN 0-8264-7695-3.
- ---. 1980. A Thousand Plateaus. Trans. Brian Massumi. London and New York: Continuum, 2004. Vol. 2 of Capitalism and Schizophrenia. 2 vols. 1972-1980. Trans. of Mille Plateaux. Paris: Les Editions de Minuit. ISBN 0-8264-7694-5.
- Guattari, Félix. 1984. Molecular Revolution: Psychiatry and Politics. Trans. Rosemary Sheed. Harmondsworth: Penguin. ISBN 0-14-055160-3.
- ---. 1995. Chaosophy. Ed. Sylvère Lotringer. Semiotext(e) Foreign Agents Ser. New York: Semiotext(e). ISBN 1-57027-019-8.
- ---. 1996. Soft Subversions. Ed. Sylvère Lotringer. Trans. David L. Sweet and Chet Wiener. Semiotext(e) Foreign Agents Ser. New York: Semiotext(e). ISBN 1-57027-030-9.
- Holland, Eugene W. Deleuze and Guattari's Anti-Oedipus: Introduction to Schizoanalysis
- Massumi, Brian. 1992. A User's Guide to Capitalism and Schizophrenia: Deviations from Deleuze and Guattari. Swerve editions. Cambridge, USA and London: MIT. ISBN 0-262-63143-1.
- Nelson, Richard Alan. 1996. A Chronology and Glossary of Propaganda in the United States. Westport, CT and London: Greenwood. ISBN 0-313-29261-2.
- Warf, Barney. Encyclopedia of Human Geography
- Kataria, Shyamal. 2019. Re-territorialization of persecuted identity: how refugee arrival generates ethno-national conflict, National Identities. Taylor and Francis. doi:10.1080/14608944.2019.1662386.
