= Gérard Mendel =

Gérard Mendel (1930 – 14 October 2004) was a French psychoanalyst and psychiatrist.

== The Revolt against the Father ==
His popularity began when he published his 1968 work La révolte contre le père ("The Revolt against the Father"). Deleuze and Guattari assessed this book as one example of the "drivel on Oedipus". Mendel argued that the father "died over a period of thousands of years" and that the "internalization" corresponding to the paternal image was produced during the Paleolithic right up until the start of the Neolithic, "approximately 8,000 years ago".

Deleuze and Guattari mention this work as an example of psychoanalysts who want to impose the Oedipus model upon everyone; psychoanalysts like Mendel consider those "who do not bow to the imperialism of Oedipus as dangerous deviants, leftists who ought to be handed over to social and police repression." In their Anti-Œdipus, they cite Mendel as an example of the prominence of a fascist tone among the most respected psychoanalysis associations.
