= Psychical nomadism =

Psychical nomadism is a philosophical term that refers to the practice of taking as one needs from any moral, religious, political, ethical, or whatever system, and leaving behind the parts of that system found to be unappealing.

It is one of the main characteristics of Hakim Bey's 1991 work T.A.Z.: The Temporary Autonomous Zone, but the notion was previously discussed by Gilles Deleuze and Félix Guattari in Nomadology: The War Machine (1980), by Jean-François Lyotard in Driftworks (1984) and by various authors in the "Oasis" issue of Semiotext(e).

Psychic nomadism facilitates the construction of ad hoc reference-frames in which to situate the temporary actions required by Temporary Autonomous Zones (TAZ).

Bey in his essay explains why he chose the name:

"We use the term "psychic nomadism" here rather than "urban nomadism," "nomadology," "driftwork," etc., simply in order to garner all these concepts into a single loose complex, to be studied in light of the coming-into-being of the TAZ."

He states that there is a paradox where our modern society’s false unity blurs all cultural diversity and any place is as good as another.

Bey describes psychic nomadism's tactical qualities along with Deleuze and Guattari's sensibilities about the war machine (French: machine de guerre):

“These nomads practice the razzia, they are corsairs, they are viruses; they have both need and desire for TAZs, camps of black tents under the desert stars, interzones, hidden fortified oases along secret caravan routes, 'liberated' bits of jungle and bad-land, no-go areas, black markets, and underground bazaars.”

Bey also discusses these nomads in terms of the Internet and cyberspace. His poetry foreshadows ideas that appear in CAE's The Electronic Disturbance and later in electronic civil disobedience. With the words "cyberspace" and "hallucination" used interchangeably, we can see William Gibson's cyberpunk novel Neuromancer (1984) being combined with Deleuze and Guattari.

"These nomads chart their course by strange stars, which might be luminous clusters of data in cyberspace, or perhaps hallucinations. Lay down a map of the land; over that, set a map of political change; over that, a map of the Net, especially the counter-Net with its emphasis on clandestine information-flow and logisitics - and finally, over all, the 1:1 map of the creative imagination, aesthetics, values. The resultant grid comes to life, animated by unexpected eddies and surges of energy, coagulations of light, secret tunnels, and surprises."

== See also ==
- Pirate utopia
