= Psychoanalytic conceptions of language =

Interrelation of language and psychology

Language has been an integral component of the psychoanalytic framework since its inception, and psychoanalytic theory intersects with linguistics and psycholinguistics.

Language is relevant to psychoanalysis in two key respects. First, it is important with respect to the supposed therapeutic process, serving as the principal means by which unconscious mental processes are given expression through the verbal exchange between analyst and patient, e.g. free association, dream analysis, transference-countertransference dynamics. Secondly, psychoanalytic theory is linked in many ways to linguistic phenomena, such as parapraxes. According to Sigmund Freud the essential difference between modes of thought characterized by primary (irrational, governed by the id) as opposed to secondary (logical, governed by the ego and external reality) thought processes is one of preverbal vs. verbal ways of conceptualizing the world.

== Freud's ideas on language ==
In 1940 Sigmund Freud wrote "...the function of speech brings material in the ego into a firm connection with the residues of visual, but more particularly of auditory, perceptions."

== Aphasia, thing- and word-presentations ==
One of Freud's earliest papers, On Aphasia (1891), was concerned with speech disorders of neurological mechanisms of which had been investigated earlier in the century by Paul Broca and Carl Wernicke. Freud was skeptical of Wernicke's findings, citing a paucity of clinical observation as his reason. Although he conceded the fact that language is linked to neurological processes, Freud repudiated a model of localization of brain function, according to which specific regions of the brain are responsible for certain cognitive functions. In contrast to most of his contemporaries, Freud rejected the notion that in most cases pathological phenomena are manifestations of physiological dysfunctions (Lanteri-Laura, 2005a).

In the same paper, Freud (1891) distinguishes between word-presentations, the mental images of words, and thing-presentations, the representations of actual objects. Word-presentations involve the linking of a conscious idea to a verbal stimulus, are associated with the secondary processes, and are oriented towards reality. Thing-presentations are essentially pre- or nonverbal images of objects, are associated with the primary processes, and are not necessarily connected with reality (Rycroft, 1995; Gibeault, 2005a, 2005b; Lanteri-Laura, 2005b). The influence of the external world on the ego is apparent here in that mental processes and word-presentations become connected only gradually as the ego differentiates from the id as a result of contact with the environment (Rycroft, 1995; Freud, 1923). The idea of thing vs. word-presentations is also evident in Freud's hypotheses concerning schizophrenia (Rycroft, 1995; Freud, 1894, 1896). It is suggested that, as a defense against intrapsychic conflict, schizophrenics divest thing-presentations of significance and come to treat word-presentations as actual things (cf. mental functioning in Piaget's preoperational stage of cognitive development).

== Psychoanalysis and psycholinguistics ==
Over the past half century, there have been efforts by psychoanalysts and cognitive psychologists to bridge the gap between their two respective disciplines. Rizzuto (2002) has discussed the nature of the verbal exchange between analyst and patient in the context of Roman Jakobson's (1976, 1990) typology of the six functions of "the speech event": (1) referential, involving contextual information; (2) poetic, referring to the construction of the form of the message; (3) emotive, or the speaker's emotional influence vis-a-vis the receiver; (4) conative, or the speaker's orientation toward the receiver; (5) phatic, or the attempt to establish and maintain contact between speaker and receiver (e.g., "Can you hear me?"); and (6) metalingual, or the application of language to itself (e.g.,"What do you mean with that word?"). Rizzuto (2002) suggests that by paying an equal amount of attention to each of the six functions of the speech act, the analyst can obtain a more comprehensive picture of the patient's affective life. Conversely, by focusing on one function at a time, the analyst can ascertain the patient's different ways of mitigating anxiety or coping with stress.

In a symposium paper on psychoanalysis and linguistics, Harris (1995) offers a variety of reasons why the mutual exchange of ideas between the two disciplines is an important enterprise. The theoretical shift in psychoanalysis from libidinal (of the Libido) development and drive states to object relations and attachment, first initiated around the middle of the twentieth century, is now incorporating more and more elements of cognitive science and psycholinguistics. The framework of intersubjectivity and model of the therapeutic alliance as a reciprocal exchange constructed by both analyst and patient call for a modification to both theory and practice, the ultimate aim of which is to think of the analytic process more in terms of interpersonal relations and "complex language worlds" (p. 616). Furthermore, over the past twenty years infancy research has greatly informed psychoanalytic theory, and the concepts of symbolism and mental representation have influenced both frameworks. According to Harris (1995), the processes involved in the transition from nonverbal to verbal ways of thinking about and experiencing the world, first investigated in infancy research, have pointed to the relevance of language with respect to psychoanalytic thinking. A closer interdisciplinary relationship between psychoanalysis and linguistics could potentially bolster the former's status as a research paradigm at the intersection of hermeneutics and natural science, a reformulation that some analysts have suggested (Strenger, 1991).
