= Cour-Cheverny =

- Commune
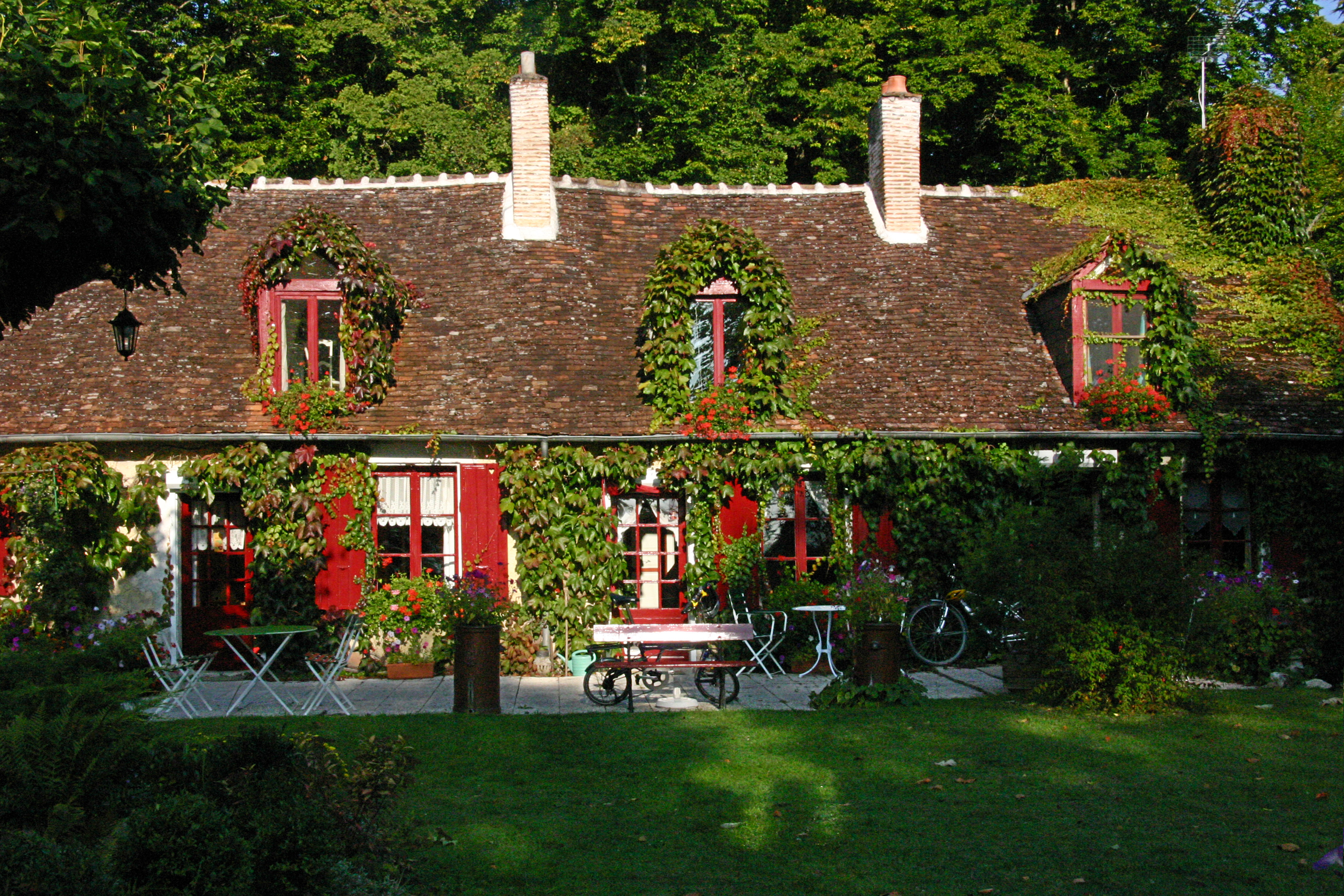
- Location of Cour-Cheverny
- Location within France Location within Centre-Val de Loire
- Coordinates: 47°30′37″N 1°27′25″E
- Country: France
- Region: Centre-Val de Loire
- Department: Loir-et-Cher
- Arrondissement: Blois
- Canton: Vineuil
- Intercommunality: CA Blois Agglopolys

Government
  - Mayor (2020–2026): François Croissandeau
- Area^{1}: 29.8 km^{2} (11.5 sq mi)
- Elevation: 87 m (285 ft)
- Highest elevation: 118 m (387 ft)
- Lowest elevation: 73 m (240 ft)
- Population (2023): 2,831
  - Density: 95.0/km^{2} (246/sq mi)
- Time zone: UTC+01:00 (CET)
  - Summer (DST): UTC+02:00 (CEST)
- INSEE/Postal code: 41067 /41700
- ^{1} French Land Register data, which excludes lakes, ponds, glaciers > 1 km^{2} (0.386 sq mi or 247 acres) and river estuaries.

Cour-Cheverny (French pronunciation: [kuʁ ʃəvɛʁni]) is a commune in the Loir-et-Cher department, Centre-Val de Loire region, France. The commune's land extends across the Loire Valley and across the Sologne region. Its inhabitants are known as Courchois.

== Toponymy ==
- The name Cour-Cheverny has its origins in the vulgar Latin word, curtis, meaning farm. It seems likely, then, that the village of Cour-Cheverny was once a large piece of land belonging to the nearby village of Cheverny.
- Over the years the village has had other names, such as Cour-en-Sologne, the name by which it was known up until the 19th century.
- The church was mentioned in 1145 as belonging to the Abbey of Bourgmoyen. It came under the diocese of Chartres at the time. Cour-Cheverny would have been a curtis, or farm, near to the small town of Cheverny, which began to grow in size and importance in the 6th century.

== Sights ==
- The Château of Sérigny, la Sistière, Beaumont, Chantreuil, les Murblins, and la Taurie.
- La Borde is a renowned psychiatric clinic offering institutional psychotherapy treatments
- The 12th-century church of Saint-Aignan, which was altered in the 16th and 17th centuries, has a nave with two bays, two aisles, a semi-circular apse, arcades of two-centred pointed arches, ribbed vaulting with a keystone dating from 1609, an east-facing great door and a tall framed spire on a central bell tower.
- The Chapel of Sérigny.
- The Oratory of la Boide.
- The Conon Valley.
- The Beuvron, a 115 km long tributary of the Loire, that runs into the Loire at Candé-sur-Beuvron.

== Population ==
Historical population
Year	Pop.	±% p.a.
1968	1,724	—
1975	1,863	+1.11%
1982	2,130	+1.93%
1990	2,347	+1.22%
1999	2,555	+0.95%
2007	2,654	+0.48%
2012	2,715	+0.46%
2017	2,845	+0.94%
2023	2,831	−0.08%
Source: INSEE

== Economy ==
=== Wine ===
The Cour Cheverny Appellation d'Origine Contrôlée (AOC) was recognized in 1997. Geographically it corresponds to the commune of Cour-Cheverny and 10 other communes in the surrounding area. The single grape variety used is Romorantin, from which a dry, white wine is produced.

The Cheverny AOC, which was also recognized in 1997, covers a wider area but also includes the commune of Cour-Cheverny. The wines produced under this appellation are dry, white wines (the main grape variety being Sauvignon blanc), and red and rosé wines (the main grape variety being Gamay).

== Events ==
- Weekly market day: Tuesday.
- Town's saint's day: Whit Monday;
- Town show: Easter and the Sunday following 15 August.
- Saint Vincent's Day, in honour of the patron saint of wine-growers, celebrated on 22 January.
- Bread Festival, first weekend in July.
- Flea Market, first weekend in August.
- Saint Cecilia's Day, in honour of the patron saint of musicians, celebrated on 22 November.

== Sports ==
- Football
- Tennis
- Table Tennis
- Basketball
- Badminton

There is even a combined sports association that oversees and coordinates 10 different sections (Gymnastics, Badminton, Basketball, Dance School, Football, Judo, Petanque, Table tennis, Shooting and Cycling (Moorland to Lakeside, i.e. off-road)). The association is called the E.S.C.C.C. (Étoile sportive de Cour-Cheverny et Cheverny or Sporting Star of Cour-Cheverny and Cheverny.)

A gymnasium, built in the last ten years, is available for indoor activities.

== Personalities ==
- Paul Renouard, the 19th-century artist, born in Cour-Cheverny
- Jean-François Deniau, a statesman and writer, 1928–2007.
- Alain Souchon, the singer, songwriter and actor

== See also ==
- Communes of the Loir-et-Cher department
