= Villeneuve-les-Sablons =

- Commune
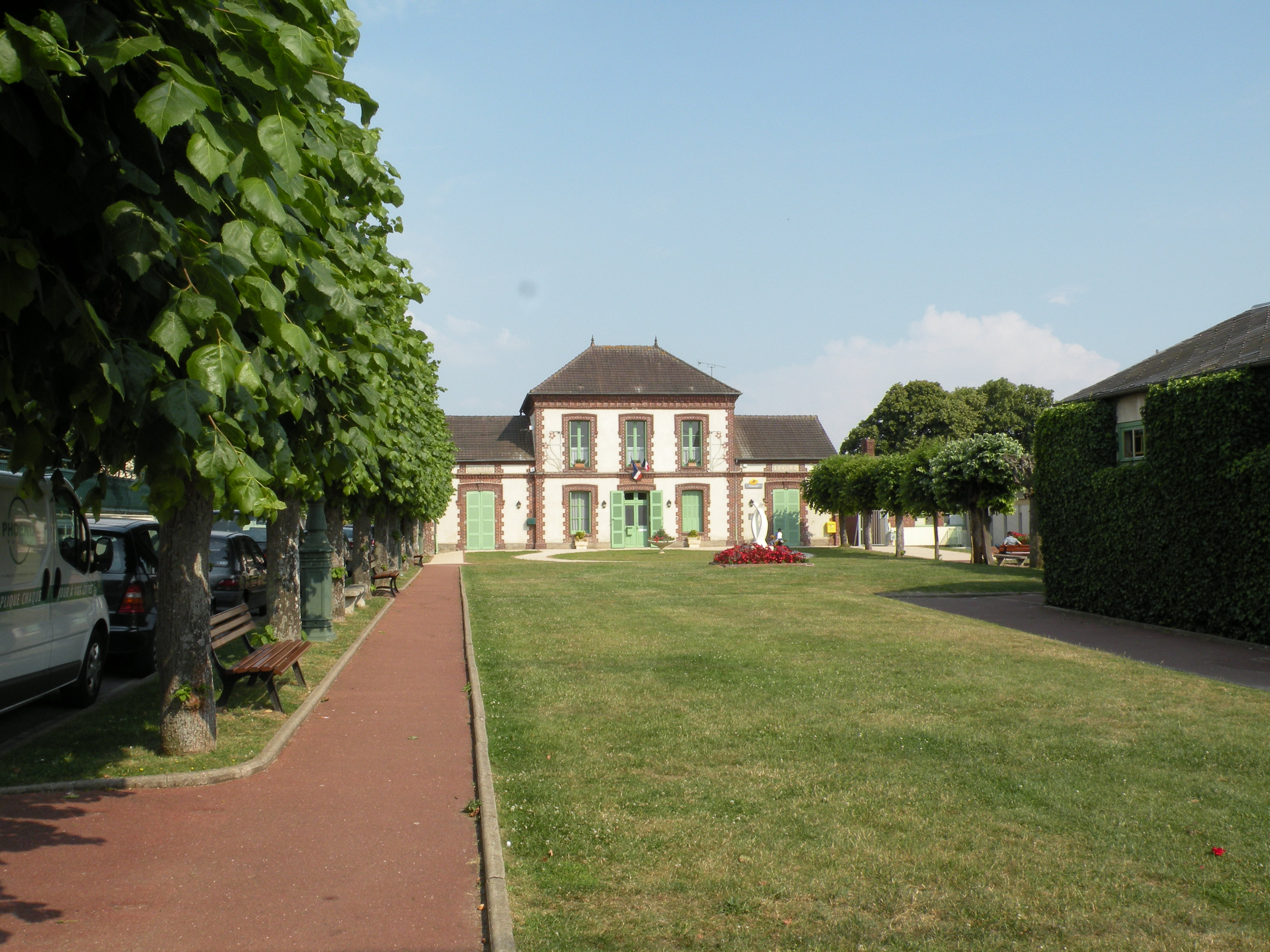
- The town hall in Villeneuve-les-Sablons
- Location of Villeneuve-les-Sablons
- Location within France Location within Hauts-de-France
- Coordinates: 49°14′15″N 2°04′39″E
- Country: France
- Region: Hauts-de-France
- Department: Oise
- Arrondissement: Beauvais
- Canton: Méru
- Intercommunality: Sablons

Government
  - Mayor (2020–2026): Christian Neveu
- Area^{1}: 4.43 km^{2} (1.71 sq mi)
- Elevation: 130 m (430 ft)
- Highest elevation: 133 m (436 ft)
- Lowest elevation: 91 m (299 ft)
- Population (2023): 1,196
  - Density: 270/km^{2} (699/sq mi)
- Time zone: UTC+01:00 (CET)
  - Summer (DST): UTC+02:00 (CEST)
- INSEE/Postal code: 60678 /60175
- ^{1} French Land Register data, which excludes lakes, ponds, glaciers > 1 km^{2} (0.386 sq mi or 247 acres) and river estuaries.

Villeneuve-les-Sablons (French pronunciation: [vilnœv le sablɔ̃]) is a commune in the Oise department in northern France.

== See also ==
- Communes of the Oise department
