= Deterritorialization =

Philosophical concept

In critical theory, deterritorialization is the process by which a social relation, called a territory, has its current organization and context altered, mutated or destroyed. The components then constitute a new territory, which is the process of reterritorialization.

The idea was developed and proposed in the work of Gilles Deleuze and Félix Guattari. For instance, in Anti-Oedipus, they observe that the understanding of the psyche was revolutionized by Sigmund Freud's concepts of libido and polymorphous perversity, and thus the psyche was initially deterritorialized, but he then conceptualized a new territory, the Oedipus complex, an understanding of tension in the psyche that is in favor of repression, thus reterritorializing it. They also observed that capitalism is "the movement of social production that goes to the very extremes of its deterritorialization", and describe it as "the new massive deterritorialization, the conjunction of deterritorialized flows".

The idea has been applied to describe the shifting of social, cultural, economic and political practices, as well as of people, objects, languages, traditions and beliefs in relation to their respective originating bodies. Some theorists have adopted a literal understanding of the word, applying it to geographical territories and their respective relations.

== Overview ==
Gilles Deleuze and Félix Guattari note that deterritorialization and reterritorialization occur simultaneously. The function of deterritorialization is defined as "the movement by which one leaves a territory", also known as a "line of flight", but deterritorialization also "constitutes and extends" the territory itself. In A Thousand Plateaus, the second volume of Capitalism and Schizophrenia, they distinguish between relative and an absolute deterritorialization. Relative deterritorialization is always accompanied by reterritorialization, while positive absolute deterritorialization is more akin to the construction of a "plane of immanence", akin to Spinoza's ontological constitution of the world. There is also a negative absolute deterritorialization, for example in the subjectivation process which is described as a construction of "the face" and an establishing of "faciality".

== Deterritorialization and reterritorialization ==
Mediatization works as a preferential source of deterritorialization, while it becomes a catalyzer of other sources of deterritorialization (migrations, tourism, vast shopping centers, and economical transformations). As Tomlinson points out, mediatization is absolutely omnipresent in everyday contemporary cultural experiences, it therefore appears as clearly decisive in deterritorialized cultural experience. The aforementioned experience implies opening up to the world and amplifying cultural horizons through the globalized mass media. This means that globalization transforms the relation between the places where we live and our cultural activities, experiences and identities. Paradoxically, deterritorialization also includes reterritorialized manifestations, which García Canclini defines as "certain relative, partial territorial relocalizations of old and new symbolic productions". According to the concept of globalization proposed by Robertson, deterritorialization and reterritorialization constitute both sides of the same coin of cultural globalization. Deterritorialization speaks of the loss of the "natural" relation between culture and the social and geographic territories, and describes a deep transformation of the link between our everyday cultural experiences and our configuration as preferably local beings. As Giddens argues, "the very tissue of spatial experience alters, conjoining proximity and distance in ways that have few close parallels in prior ages". Nevertheless, it is very important not to interpret the deterritorialization of localized cultural experiences as an impoverishment of cultural interaction, but as a transformation produced by the impact the growing cultural transnational connections have on the local realm, which means that deterritorialization generates a relativization and a transformation of local cultural experiences, whether it is from the local event itself or by the projection of symbolical shapes from the local event. In an autoethnographic study of living and working in Qatar, De Jong (2014) applied Deleuze and Guattari's concepts of deterritorialization and reterritorialization to the formation of relational identity. Drawing on experiences of institutional power, expatriate life and consumer culture, the study examines how deterritorialization can produce alienation, disconnection and diminished capacities for action rather than necessarily leading to liberation. It also illustrates how reterritorialization can emerge through everyday practices and spaces, including shopping malls, which may provide a sense of familiarity, belonging and security.

=== Displacement ===
Although the process of across-boundaries flow was imbalanced, it cannot be denied that it has profound influence on politics, economics, and culture from every dimension. Although there were imbalanced power presences in different nations, it is undeniable that people will gradually realize that in addition to their own lives around are mutually implicated in the distant shore, but also to reconcile the impact between their lives around and the distant side. That is, the flow process of beyond the boundaries not only the representatives of strengthening interdependence, but also representatives that they both have the cognitive of globalization. It formed an easily comprehensive characteristics about "superterritorial" and "transworld". In other words, the original divide in the territorial boundaries between them have lost some authority, what is the main phenomenon of deterritorialization. Therefore, no matter from what angle to explore globalization, deterritorialization has been a general consensus.

The word "deterritorialization" may have different meanings. Tomlinson had pointed out that many scholars use the vocabulary of deterritorialization to explain the process of globalization, however, there are still some scholars who prefer the use of related words, such as "delocalization" or "displacement". It emphasized different point in the use of different terms, but basically we can understand the meaning of these words that is to understand the transformation between local and cultures of the global modernity. In the text of Tomlinson, however, we found that he uses "deterritorialization" to explain the phenomenon instead of using "delocalization". But we can unearth that "deterritorialization" was more focused on liberating the people from the "local", is a process which no longer just only affected by neighborhood and familiar local, but also deeply influenced by the distant place.

Sociologist Anthony Giddens has defined modernity in terms of an experience of 'distanciation', in which familiar, local environments are interlaced with distant forces as a result of globalization. He has argued that related perceptions of "displacement" (and estrangement from the local community) may be mitigated by global media, which allow some broader experience of community.

=== Disjunctive relationships ===
However, communication technology may act not only to fill the field of local cultural significance and identity which corroded by deterritorialization, but also to establish global cultural politics. Politics of deterritorialization and the displacement of sociological will lead the struggle between state and nation. One important new feature of global cultural politics, tied to the disjunctive relationships among the various landscapes which proposed by Appadurai, is that state and nation are at each other's throats, and the hyphen that links them is now less an icon of conjuncture than an index of disjuncture.

== In anthropology ==
When referring to culture, anthropologists use the term deterritorialized to refer to a weakening of ties between culture and place. This means the removal of cultural subjects and objects from a certain location in space and time. It implies that certain cultural aspects tend to transcend specific territorial boundaries in a world that consists of things fundamentally in motion.

=== In cultural globalization ===
In the context of cultural globalization, Hernandez argues that deterritorialization is a cultural feature developed by the "mediatization, migration, and commodification which characterize globalized modernity".

According to the works of Arjun Appadurai, the cultural distancing from the locality is intensified when people are able to expand and alter their imagination through the mediatization of alien cultural conditions, making the culture of remote origin one of a familiar material. That makes it difficult for a local entity to sustain and retain its own local cultural identity, which also affects the national identity of the region. Appadurai writes in his 1990 essay "Disjuncture and Difference" that:

Deterritorialization, in general, is one of the central forces of the modern world because it brings laboring populations in to the lower-class sectors and spaces of relatively wealthy societies, while sometimes creating exaggerated and intensified senses of criticism or attachment to politics in the home state. Deterritorialization, whether of Hindus, Sikhs, Palestinians, or Ukrainians, is now at the core of a variety of global fundamentalisms, including Islamic and Hindu fundamentalism. In the Hindu case, for example, it is clear that the overseas movement of Indians has been exploited by a variety of interests both within and outside India to create a complicated network of finances and religious identifications, by which the problem of cultural reproduction for Hindus abroad has become tied to the politics of Hindu fundamentalism at home. At the same time, deterritorialization creates new markets for film companies, art impressions, and travel agencies, which thrive on the end of the deterritorialized population for contact with its homeland. Naturally, these invented homelands, which constitute the mediascapes of deterritorialized groups, can often become sufficiently fantastic and one-sided that they provide the material for new ideoscapes in which ethnic conflicts can begin to erupt.

== See also ==
- Accelerationism
- Empire
- Fleet in being, a naval example of a "vector of deterritorialization", according to Deleuze & Guattari quoting Paul Virilio
- Social alienation
