= A Thousand Plateaus =

1980 book by Gilles Deleuze and Félix Guattari

- Cover of the first edition
- Authors: Gilles Deleuze; Félix Guattari
- Original title: Mille plateaux
- Translator: Brian Massumi
- Language: French
- Series: Capitalism and Schizophrenia
- Subject: Philosophy; schizoanalysis; micropolitics; aesthetics; political economy
- Published: 1980 (Les Éditions de Minuit, in French); 1987 (University of Minnesota Press, in English)
- Publication place: France
- Media type: Print (hardback and paperback)
- Pages: 645 (French edition); 610 (English translation)
- ISBN: 978-0816614028
- Preceded by: Kafka: Toward a Minor Literature
- Followed by: What is Philosophy?

A Thousand Plateaus: Capitalism and Schizophrenia (French: Mille plateaux) is a 1980 book by the French philosopher Gilles Deleuze and the French psychoanalyst Félix Guattari. It is the second and final volume of their collaborative work Capitalism and Schizophrenia. While the first volume, Anti-Oedipus (1972), was a critique of contemporary uses of psychoanalysis and Marxism, A Thousand Plateaus was developed as an experimental work of philosophy covering a far wider range of topics, serving as a "positive exercise" in what Deleuze and Guattari refer to as rhizomatic thought.

== Summary ==
Like the first volume of Deleuze and Guattari's Capitalism and Schizophrenia, Anti-Oedipus (1972), A Thousand Plateaus is politically and terminologically provocative and is intended as a work of schizoanalysis, but focuses more on what could be considered systematic, environmental and spatial philosophy, often dealing with the natural world, popular culture, measurements and mathematics. A "plateau", borrowed from ideas in Gregory Bateson's research on Balinese culture, is "a continuous, self-vibrating region of intensities"; the chapters in the book are described as plateaus, while their respective dates also signify a level of intensity, where "each plateau can be read starting anywhere and can be related to any other plateau." Deleuze and Guattari describe the book itself as a rhizome due to how it was written and produced. A Thousand Plateaus has been described as dealing with their ideas of the rhizome, as well as the body without organs, the plane of immanence, abstract machines, becoming, lines of flight, assemblages, smooth and striated space, state apparatuses, faciality, performativity in language, binary branching structures in language, deterritorialization and reterritorialization, arborescence, pragmatics, strata, stratification and destratification, the war machine, the signified, signifier and sign, and coding/recoding.

In the plateaus (chapters) of the book, they discuss psychoanalysts (Freud, Jung, Lacan—who trained Guattari, and Melanie Klein), composers (Chopin, Debussy, Mozart, Pierre Boulez, and Olivier Messiaen), artists (Klee, Kandinsky, and Pollock), philosophers (Husserl, Foucault, Bergson, Nietzsche, Kierkegaard, and Gilbert Simondon), historians (Ibn Khaldun, Georges Dumézil, and Fernand Braudel), and linguists (Chomsky, Labov, Benveniste, Guillaume, Austin, Hjelmslev, and Voloshinov). Deleuze and Guattari highly favor and criticize these figures, sometimes overlapping or "plugging" their statements, works, research, studies and fragments "into each other".

The book starts with an introduction titled "Rhizome" that explains rhizomatic philosophy (addressing not just the book itself but all books as rhizomes), and ends with a conclusion, "Concrete Rules and Abstract Machines", that fully elaborates on and intertwines all of the major concepts in the book, as well as Anti-Oedipus, with a numbering system representing plateaus. In between are thirteen chapters, each dated non-linearly, sometimes precisely ("November 28, 1947: How Do You Make Yourself a Body Without Organs?"), sometimes less so ("10,000 B.C.: The Geology of Morals (Who Does the Earth Think It Is?)"). In the sixth chapter, "Year Zero: Faciality" (visagéité), the notion of face is discussed as an "overcoding" of body, but also as being in dialectical tension with landscape (paysagéité). Faciality, the essence of the face, is ultimately a dominating and dangerously compelling trait of bodies, and Deleuze and Guattari remark that the face "is a whole body unto itself: it is like the body of the center of significance to which all of the deterritorialized signs affix themselves, and it marks the limit of their deterritorialization."

Like Anti-Oedipus, Deleuze and Guattari evaluate and criticize psychoanalysis: in the first two chapters, they discuss the work of Sigmund Freud, especially referring to the case histories of the Wolf Man and Little Hans. Their schizoanalysis of Freud's cases refuses the Oedipalization they were previously given, and aims to exercise the content of their fantasies instead; "Look at what happened to Little Hans already [...] they kept on breaking his rhizome and blotching his map, setting it straight for him, blocking his every way out, until he began to desire his own shame and guilt, until they had rooted shame and guilt in him". In particular, focusing on child psychoanalysis, they remark that "children are Spinozists." Meanwhile, owing to their mode of literary analysis, A Thousand Plateaus also frequently discusses novels. In "1874: Three Novellas, or "What Happened?"", they discuss Henry James' In the Cage (1898) and "The Story of the Abyss and the Spyglass" by Pierrette Fleutiaux, but they also evoke F. Scott Fitzgerald's essay The Crack-Up (1945) (which Deleuze previously discussed in The Logic of Sense), because his depression and frustration in the essay is dramatized, and Deleuze's idea of the crack constitutes a narrativized breakdown. The works of Franz Kafka, Marcel Proust, Virginia Woolf, Henry Miller, D. H. Lawrence, Carlos Castaneda, H. P. Lovecraft, Herman Melville and Chrétien de Troyes are also discussed, often in conjunction with the rhizome, becoming, faciality, and the regimes of signs.

== Reception ==
A Thousand Plateaus has been considered a major statement of post-structuralism and postmodernism. Mark Poster writes that the work "contains promising elaborations of a postmodern theory of the social and political." Writing in the foreword to his translation, Massumi comments that the work "is less a critique than a positive exercise in the affirmative 'nomad' thought called for in Anti-Oedipus." Massumi contrasts "nomad thought" with the "state philosophy... that has characterized Western metaphysics since Plato".

Deleuze critic Eugene W. Holland suggests that the work complicates the slogans and oppositions developed in its predecessor. Whereas Anti-Oedipus created binaries such as molar/molecular, paranoid/schizophrenic, and deterritorialization/reterritorialization, A Thousand Plateaus shows how such distinctions are operations on the surface of a deeper field with more complicated and multidimensional dynamics. In so doing, the book is less engaged with history than with topics like biology and geology. Massumi writes that A Thousand Plateaus differs drastically in tone, content, and composition from Anti-Oedipus. In his view, the schizoanalysis the authors practice is not so much a study of their "pathological condition", but a "positive process" that involves "inventive connection".

Bill Readings appropriates the term "singularity" from A Thousand Plateaus, "to indicate that there is no longer a subject-position available to function as the site of the conscious synthesis of sense-impressions." The sociologist Nikolas Rose writes that Deleuze and Guattari articulate "the most radical alternative to the conventional image of subjectivity as coherent, enduring, and individualized".

In 1997, the physicists Alan Sokal and Jean Bricmont asserted that the book contains many passages in which Deleuze and Guattari use "pseudo-scientific language". Writing about this "science wars critique," Daniel Smith and John Protevi contend that "much of their chapter on Deleuze consists of exasperated exclamations of incomprehension." Similarly, in a 2015 interview, British philosopher Roger Scruton characterized A Thousand Plateaus as "[a] huge, totally unreadable tome by somebody who can't write French." At the beginning of a short essay on postmodernism, Jean-François Lyotard lists examples of what he describes as a desire "to put an end to experimentation", including a displeased reaction to A Thousand Plateaus that he had read in a weekly literary magazine, which said that readers of philosophy "expect [...] to be "gratified with a little sense". Behind this "slackening" desire to constrain language use, Lyotard identifies a "desire for a return to terror."

Digital media theorist Janet Murray links the work to the aesthetic of hypertext.

Gaming and electronic literature expert Espen Aarseth draws parallels between Deleuze and Guattari's idea of the rhizome and semiotician Umberto Eco's idea of the net.

Christopher Miller criticizes Deleuze and Guattari's use of "second-hand" anthropological sources without providing the reader with contextualization of the colonialist "mission" that led to their writing. Timothy Laurie says that this claim is inaccurate, but that Deleuze & Guattari should extend that same "rigor" to uncovering the political and economic entanglements which contextualize academic philosophy.

== Influence ==
A Thousand Plateaus was an influence on the political philosophers Michael Hardt and Antonio Negri's book Empire (2000).

The sociologist John Urry sees Deleuze and Guattari's metaphor of the nomad as having "infected contemporary social thought."

The philosopher Manuel DeLanda, in A New Philosophy of Society (2006), adopts Deleuze's theory of assemblages, taken from A Thousand Plateaus.

== See also ==
- Fleet in being (quoting Paul Virilio; the "fleet in being" is a "vector of deterritorialization")
- Mille Plateaux (record label)
