= Plane of immanence =

Concept by Gilles Deleuze

Plane of immanence (French: plan d'immanence) is a founding concept in the metaphysics or ontology of French philosopher Gilles Deleuze.

Immanence, meaning residing or becoming within, generally offers a relative opposition to transcendence, that which extends beyond or outside. Deleuze "refuses to see deviations, redundancies, destructions, cruelties or contingency as accidents that befall or lie outside life; life and death [are] aspects of desire or the plane of immanence." This plane is a pure immanence which is an unqualified immersion or embeddedness, an immanence which denies transcendence as a real distinction, Cartesian or otherwise. Pure immanence is thus often referred to as a pure plane, an infinite field or smooth space without substantial or constitutive division. In his final essay entitled Immanence: A Life, Deleuze wrote: "It is only when immanence is no longer immanence to anything other than itself that we can speak of a plane of immanence."

== Immanence as a pure plane ==
The plane of immanence is metaphysically consistent with Spinoza’s single substance (God or Nature) in the sense that immanence is not immanent to substance but rather that immanence is substance, that is, immanent to itself. Pure immanence therefore will have consequences not only for the validity of a philosophical reliance on transcendence, but simultaneously for dualism and idealism. Mind may no longer be conceived as a self-contained field, substantially differentiated from body (dualism), nor as the primary condition of unilateral subjective mediation of external objects or events (idealism). Thus, all real distinctions (mind and body, God and matter, interiority and exteriority, etc.) are collapsed or flattened into an even consistency or plane, namely immanence itself, that is, immanence without opposition.

The plane of immanence thus is often called a plane of consistency accordingly. As a geometric plane, it is in no way bound to a mental design but rather an abstract or virtual design; which for Deleuze, is the metaphysical or ontological itself: a formless, univocal, self-organizing process which always qualitatively differentiates from itself. So in A Thousand Plateaus (with Félix Guattari), a plane of immanence will eliminate problems of preeminent forms, transcendental subjects, original genesis and real structures: "Here, there are no longer any forms or developments of forms; nor are there subjects or the formation of subjects. There is no structure, any more than there is genesis." In this sense, Hegel’s Spirit (Geist) which experiences a self-alienation and eventual reconciliation with itself via its own linear dialectic through a material history becomes irreconcilable with pure immanence as it depends precisely on a pre-established form or order, namely Spirit itself. Rather, on the plane of immanence there are only complex networks of forces, particles, connections, relations, affects and becomings: "There are only relations of movement and rest, speed and slowness between unformed elements, or at least between elements that are relatively unformed, molecules, and particles of all kinds. There are only haecceities, affects, subjectless individuations that constitute collective assemblages. ... We call this plane, which knows only longitudes and latitudes, speeds and haecceities, the plane of consistency or composition (as opposed to a plan(e) of organization or development)."

The plane of immanence necessitates an immanent philosophy. Concepts and representations may no longer be considered vacuous forms awaiting content (concept of x, representation of y) but become active productions in themselves, constantly affecting and being affected by other concepts, representations, images, bodies etc. In their final work together, What is Philosophy?, Deleuze and Guattari state that the plane of immanence constitutes "the absolute ground of philosophy, its earth or deterritorialization, the foundation on which it creates its concepts."

== Pure immanence as lived philosophy ==
The concept of the plane itself is significant as it implies that immanence cannot simply be conceived as the within, but also as the upon, as well as the of. An object is not simply within a larger system, but folds from that very same system, functioning and operating consistently upon it, with it and through it, immanently mapping its environment, discovering its own dynamic powers and kinetic relations, as well as the relative limits of those powers and relations. Thus, without a theoretical reliance on transcendent principles, categories or real divisions producing relative breaks or screens of atomistic enclosure, the concept of the plane of immanence may replace nicely any benefits of a philosophical transcendentalism: "Absolute immanence is in itself: it is not in something, to something; it does not depend on an object or belong to a subject. ... When the subject or the object falling outside the plane of immanence is taken as a universal subject or as any object to which immanence is attributed, ... immanence is distorted, for it then finds itself enclosed in the transcendent."

Finally, Deleuze offers that pure immanence and life will suppose one another unconditionally: "We will say of pure immanence that it is A LIFE, and nothing else. ... A life is the immanence of immanence, absolute immanence: it is complete power, complete bliss." This is not some abstract, mystical notion of life but a life, a specific yet impersonal, indefinite life discovered in the real singularity of events and virtuality of moments. A life is subjectless, neutral, and preceding all individuation and stratification, is present in all things, and thus always immanent to itself. "A life is everywhere ...: an immanent life carrying with it the events and singularities that are merely actualized in subjects and objects."

An ethics of immanence will disavow its reference to judgments of good and evil, right and wrong, as according to a transcendent model, rule or law. Rather the diversity of living things and particularity of events will demand the concrete methods of immanent evaluation (ethics) and immanent experimentation (creativity). These twin concepts will become the basis of a lived Deleuzian ethic.

== See also ==
- Actual idealism
- Baruch Spinoza
- Complex systems
- Husserl
- Henri Bergson
- Nonduality
- Substance theory
- Transcendence

== Sources ==
- Deleuze, Gilles and Félix Guattari. 1980. A Thousand Plateaus. Trans. Brian Massumi. London and New York: Continuum, 2004. Vol. 2 of Capitalism and Schizophrenia. 2 vols. 1972–1980. Trans. of Mille Plateaux. Paris: Les Editions de Minuit. ISBN 0-8264-7694-5.
