= Eugene W. Holland =

American scholar

Eugene Willam Holland
- Born: April 13, 1953 (age 73)

Academic background
- Education: Yale University (BA); University of California, San Diego (PhD)

Academic work
- Discipline: Social theory; critical theory
- Institutions: Ohio State University

Eugene William Holland (born April 13, 1953) is an American scholar of interdisciplinary social and critical theory and professor emeritus at Ohio State University. His scholarship focuses on the philosophy and political economy of Gilles Deleuze and Félix Guattari. He is the author of five monographs, including widely cited reader's guides to Anti-Oedipus and A Thousand Plateaus. Historian François Dosse identifies Holland as part of the early anglophone reception of Deleuze and Guattari's work.

== Early life and education ==
Holland studied philosophy and French literature at Yale University. In 1974 he enrolled in the doctoral program in comparative literature at the University of California, San Diego, where he studied with Fredric Jameson and first encountered Anti-Oedipus in Jameson's seminar, later organizing a reading group that worked through the text over several months. When Jameson departed UCSD, Holland selected Michel de Certeau and Richard Terdiman as his dissertation co-directors. He received a grant from the French government to conduct dissertation research in Paris, during which he attended Deleuze's film seminars at Paris-VIII in the early 1980s.

== Career ==
After completing his doctorate, Holland held a Mellon postdoctoral fellowship at Rice University, where he participated in the Culture of Capital research program. He subsequently held an appointment as assistant professor of French at the University of Iowa. In 1985 he was appointed to the faculty of Ohio State University, where he taught in the Department of Comparative Studies. He was granted emeritus status effective June 1, 2017.

== Scholarship ==
Holland's scholarship examines the relationship between political economy, psychoanalysis, and cultural theory, with sustained attention to Deleuze and Guattari. His first monograph, Baudelaire and Schizoanalysis (Cambridge University Press, 1993), applies schizoanalytic concepts to nineteenth-century French literature. The Times Literary Supplement described it as "a splendid example of passionate theorizing."

His 1999 introduction to Anti-Oedipus was reviewed in MLN.

Holland describes his theoretical approach as "minor Marxism," a reading of Deleuze and Guattari that retains elements of Marxist political economy while rejecting teleological models of historical change. A related concept, "nonlinear historical materialism," draws on complexity theory and Rosa Luxemburg's Accumulation of Capital to argue for a contingent account of historical development.

His book Nomad Citizenship proposes a "slow-motion general strike," understood as a gradual collective withdrawal from capitalist markets. Within this framework, Holland uses jazz group improvisation as a model for collective activity coordinated without central command.

His most recent monograph, Perversions of the Market, examines sadism, masochism, and the cultural logic of capitalism and has been reviewed in Rethinking Marxism.

== Selected works ==
=== Books ===
- Baudelaire and Schizoanalysis: The Socio-Poetics of Modernism (Cambridge University Press, 1993)
- Deleuze and Guattari's Anti-Oedipus: Introduction to Schizoanalysis (Routledge, 1999)
  - Turkish translation: Deleuze ve Guattari'nin Anti-Oedipus'u: Şizoanalize Giriş (Otonom Yayıncılık, 2007)
- Nomad Citizenship: Free-Market Communism and the Slow-Motion General Strike (University of Minnesota Press, 2011)
- Deleuze and Guattari's "A Thousand Plateaus": A Reader's Guide (Bloomsbury/Continuum, 2013)
  - Chinese translation: 导读德勒兹与加塔利《千高原》 (Chongqing University Press)
- Perversions of the Market: Sadism, Masochism, and the Culture of Capitalism (SUNY Press, 2024)

=== Selected edited volumes and essays ===
- Gilles Deleuze: Image and Text, co-edited with Daniel W. Smith and Charles J. Stivale (Continuum, 2009)
- "Schizoanalysis, Nomadology, Fascism," in Deleuze and Politics (Edinburgh University Press, 2008)
- "Deleuze and Psychoanalysis," in The Cambridge Companion to Deleuze, ed. Daniel W. Smith and Henry Somers-Hall (Cambridge University Press, 2012)
- "Deleuze and Guattari and Minor Marxism," in (Mis)Readings of Marx in Continental Philosophy (Palgrave, 2014)
