= Multiplicity (philosophy) =

Philosophical concept

Multiplicity (French: multiplicité) is a philosophical concept developed by Edmund Husserl and Henri Bergson from Riemann's description of the mathematical concept. In his essay The Idea of Duration, Bergson discusses multiplicity in light of the notion of unity. Whereas a unity refers to a given thing in as far as it is a whole, multiplicity refers to the "parts of the unity which can be considered separately." Bergson distinguishes two kinds of multiplicity: one form of multiplicity refers to parts which are quantitative, distinct, and countable, and the other form of multiplicity refers to parts that are qualitative, which interpenetrate, and which each can give rise to qualitatively different perception of the whole.

== Gilles Deleuze's multiplicity ==
Jonathan Roffe, a Deleuzian scholar, explains that multiplicity is one of Gilles Deleuze's most difficult concepts to grasp. Roffe explains, instead of considering multiple, as countable unities, consider it "substantively" as an "a multiplicity" (emphasis added: 181); in other words, as a noun, not an adjective. A multiplicity, unlike a multiple, does not derive or reference a unity of the One or the many. It's a rhizome of relations that is not made up of elements (unities) rather is made up of relations. Ontologically, a multiplicity is a mode of being, that is, how being expresses itself through dimensions of relations, not as an elemental substance. A multiplicity is "a complex structure" of differential relations modelled on differential calculus, in which singularities structure how the dimensions of relations organise as freedom for actualisation. For Deleuze, a multiplicity is determined by its variables and the relations between them, not by assembling pre-existing elements under a whole. A multiplicity is not a substance made up of parts like a prior unity; rather, it is a structure of relations whose actualizations take determinate form without resembling the multiplicity itself. Multiplicity describes ontology as being differential relations rather than substance. A multiplicity resides in Deleuze's virtual, they are an intensity or sense of an Idea, or the condition of possibility of the actual.

Roffe describes that there is a manifold of multiplicities: "Everything for Deleuze is a multiplicity ... " (181). There are two senses of multiplicity in Deleuze, (1) as a complex structure and (2) as the complex structure.

Roffe also describes the two multiplicities of Bergson's, which Deleuze works with: extensive numerical multiplicities/space and continuous intensive multiplicities/time. According to Roffe's Deleuze, space can be divided (if you put a chair – or movement – in space it is divided); time, on the other hand, cannot be divided (if you put a chair in time, time is still contiguous; thus, no division). The only way time can be divided is if it changes in nature to become something other than time. Space covered by movement cannot be divided unless it changes in nature to be space. The importance of this, according to Roffe's Deleuze, is that multiplicities carry nothing essential that holds eternally, multiplicities change in an encounter with an other. A multiplicity is space covered by movement, expressing difference through continuous variation.

This significant slippery concept of Deleuze's, multiplicity, according to Roffe, undergirds other important concepts of Deleuze's: rhizome, assemblage, and ‘concept'. However, Roffe does not elaborate on this point. Instead, he draws on Deleuze's notions of 'virtual' and 'actual' and within both realms multiplicities exist. There are virtual multiplicities and actual multiplicities. A virtual multiplicity is real but without being actual, and provides being with the conditions for actualisations, for example, movement.

== See also ==
- Contextualism
- Perspectivism
- Rhizome (philosophy)

== Sources ==
- Bergson, Henri. 2002. Henri Bergson. Key Writings. Edited by Keith Ansell Pearson and John Mullarkey. New York and London: Continuum.
- Deleuze, Gilles. 1986. Foucault.
- Tampio, Nicholas, ["Multiplicity"] Sage Encyclopedia of Political Theory (2010).
