= Félix Guattari =

French psychoanalyst and social activist (1930–1992)

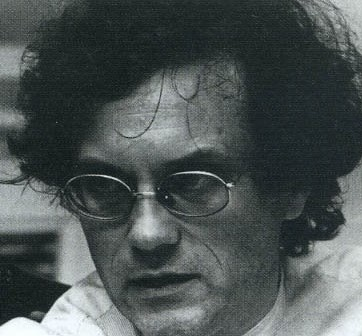
- Born: Pierre-Félix Guattari; 30 March 1930; Villeneuve-les-Sablons, Oise, France
- Died: 29 August 1992 (aged 62); Cour-Cheverny, France
- Political party: List: PCF (1945–1956); PCI (1955–1958); La Voie communiste (1958–1964)

Education
- Education: University of Paris
- Academic advisors: Fernand Oury; Jean Oury

Philosophical work
- Era: 20th-century philosophy
- Region: Western philosophy
- School: Continental philosophy, psychoanalysis, post-Marxism, post-structuralism, institutional psychotherapy
- Institutions: CERFI; University of Paris VIII
- Notable students: Anne Querrien
- Main interests: Psychoanalysis, Marxist philosophy, political philosophy, semiotics
- Notable ideas: Assemblage, desiring-production, deterritorialization, ecosophy, schizoanalysis, chaosmosis

Pierre-Félix Guattari (/ɡwəˈtɑːri/ gwə-TAR-ee; French: [pjɛʁ feliks ɡwataʁi]; 30 March 1930 – 29 August 1992) was a French psychoanalyst, political philosopher, semiotician, social activist, and screenwriter. He co-founded schizoanalysis with Gilles Deleuze, and created ecosophy independently of Arne Næss. He has become best known for his literary and philosophical collaborations with Deleuze, most notably Anti-Oedipus (1972) and A Thousand Plateaus (1980), the two volumes of their theoretical work Capitalism and Schizophrenia.

== Biography ==
=== Clinic of La Borde ===
Guattari was born in Villeneuve-les-Sablons, a working-class suburb of northwest Paris, France. He engaged in Trotskyist political activism as a teenager, before serving as French psychoanalyst Jacques Lacan's apprentice and analysand in the early 1950s. Subsequently, he worked at the experimental psychiatric clinic of La Borde (in the town of Cour-Cheverny) under the direction of Lacan's pupil Jean Oury. He first met Oury at a private psychiatric clinic in Saumery in the Loire Valley at the suggestion of Oury's brother Fernand, who had been Guattari's high school teacher. Guattari followed Oury to La Borde in 1955, two years after it had been established. At the time, La Borde was a venue for conversation among students of philosophy, psychology, ethnology, and social work.

One particularly novel orientation developed at La Borde consisted of the suspension of the classical analyst/analysand pair in favour of an open confrontation in group therapy. In contrast to the Freudian school's individualistic style of analysis, this practice studied the dynamics of several subjects in complex interaction. It led Guattari into a broader philosophical exploration of, and political engagement with, a vast array of intellectual and cultural domains (philosophy, ethnology, linguistics, education, mathematics, architecture, etc.).

=== 1960s–1970s: political and social activism ===
From 1955 to 1965 Guattari edited and contributed to La Voie Communiste (Communist Way), a Trotskyist newspaper. He supported anti-colonialist struggles as well as the Italian Autonomists. Guattari also took part in the G.T.P.S.I., which gathered many psychiatrists at the beginning of the 1960s and created the Association of Institutional Psychotherapy in November 1965. It was at the same time that he founded, along with other militants, the F.G.E.R.I. (Federation of Groups for Institutional Study & Research) and its review Recherche (Research), working on philosophy, psychoanalysis, ethnology, education, mathematics, architecture, etc. The F.G.E.R.I. came to represent aspects of the multiple political and cultural engagements of Guattari: the Group for Young Hispanics, the Franco-Chinese Friendships (in the times of the people's communes), the opposition activities with the wars in Algeria and Vietnam, the participation in the M.N.E.F., with the U.N.E.F., the policy of the offices of psychological academic aid (B.A.P.U.), the organization of the University Working Groups (G.T.U.), but also the reorganizations of the training courses with the Centers of Training to the Methods of Education Activities (C.E.M.E.A.) for psychiatric male nurses, as well as the formation of a Fellowship of Nurses (Amicales d'infirmiers) (in 1958), the studies on architecture and the projects of construction of a day hospital for "students and young workers".

In 1967 he appeared as one of the founders of OSARLA (Organization of solidarity and Aid to the Latin-American Revolution). In 1968, Guattari met Daniel Cohn-Bendit, Jean-Jacques Lebel, and Julian Beck. He was involved in the large-scale French protests of May 1968, starting from the Movement of 22 March. It was in the aftermath of 1968 that Guattari met Gilles Deleuze at the University of Vincennes. Then he began to lay the groundwork for Anti-Oedipus (1972), which Michel Foucault described as "an introduction to the non-fascist life" in his preface to the book. In 1970, he created the Center for the Study and Research of Institutional Formation (CERFI), which developed the approach explored in the Recherches journal. In 1973, Guattari was tried and fined for committing an "outrage to public decency" for publishing an issue of Recherches on homosexuality. In 1977, he created the CINEL for "new spaces of freedom" before joining the environmental movement with his "ecosophy" in the 1980s.

=== 1970s–1980s: deinstitutionalization and anti-psychoanalysis ===
Together with French post-structuralist philosopher Gilles Deleuze, Guattari asserted that the institution of psychoanalysis has become a center of power and that its confessional techniques resemble those included and utilized within the Christian religion. Their most in-depth criticism of the power structure of psychoanalysis and its connivance with capitalism are found in Anti-Oedipus (1972) and A Thousand Plateaus (1980), the two volumes of their theoretical work Capitalism and Schizophrenia. In Anti-Oedipus, Deleuze and Guattari take the cases of Gérard Mendel, Bela Grunberger, and Janine Chasseguet-Smirgel, prominent members of the most respected psychoanalytical associations (including the IPA), to suggest that, traditionally, psychoanalysis had always enthusiastically enjoyed and embraced a police state throughout its history.

=== 1980s–1990s: last years ===
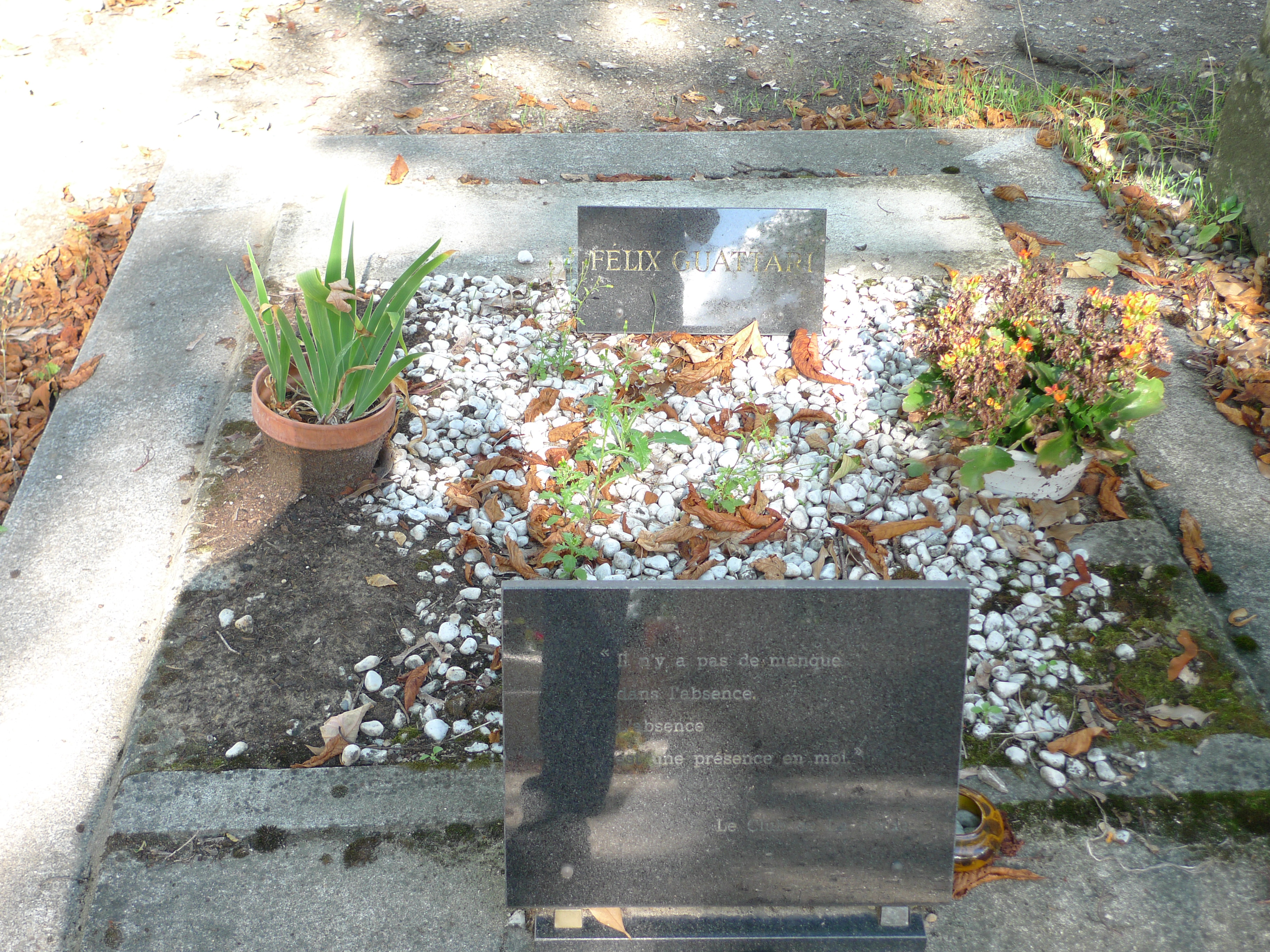
Grave of Guattari at Père Lachaise Cemetery, Paris

Guattari viewed the primary commodity produced under capitalism as subjectivity itself. According to Guattari, producing consuming subjects with novel desires satisfiable through continuing purchase of commodities and experiences is the precondition to creating a consumer society. In his last book, Chaosmosis (1992), Guattari returned to the question of subjectivity: "How to produce it, collect it, enrich it, reinvent it permanently in order to make it compatible with mutant Universes of value?" This concern runs through all of his works, from Psychoanalysis and Transversality (a collection of articles from 1957 to 1972), through Years of Winter (1980–1986) and Schizoanalytic Cartographies (1989), to his collaboration with Deleuze, What is Philosophy? (1991). In Chaosmosis, Guattari proposes an analysis of subjectivity in terms of four functions: (1) material, energetic, and semiotic fluxes; (2) concrete and abstract machinic phyla; (3) virtual universes of value; and (4) finite existential territories. This scheme attempts to grasp the heterogeneity of components involved in the production of subjectivity, as Guattari understands it, which include both signifying semiotic components as well as "a-signifying semiological dimensions" (which work "in parallel or independently of" any signifying function that they may have).

=== Death and posthumous publications ===
On 29 August 1992, two weeks after an interview for the Greek television curated by Yiorgos Veltsos, Guattari died in La Borde from a heart attack.

In 1995, the posthumous release of Guattari's Chaosophy published essays and interviews concerning Guattari's work as director of the experimental La Borde and his collaborations with Deleuze. The collection includes essays such as "Balance-Sheet Program for Desiring Machines," cosigned by Deleuze (with whom he had coauthored Anti-Oedipus and A Thousand Plateaus), and "Everybody Wants To Be a Fascist." It provides an introduction to Guattari's theories on "schizoanalysis", a process that develops Sigmund Freud's psychoanalysis but which pursues a more experimental and collective approach towards analysis.

In 1996, another collection of Guattari's essays, lectures, and interviews, Soft Subversions, was published, which traces the development of his thought and activity throughout the 1980s ("the winter years"). His analyses of art, cinema, youth culture, economics, and power formations, develop concepts such as "micropolitics," "schizoanalysis," and "becoming-woman," which aim to liberate subjectivity and open up new horizons for political and creative resistance to the standardizing and homogenizing processes of global capitalism (which he calls "Integrated World Capitalism") in the "post-media era." For example, he used the term "micropolitics" to delimit a certain level of observation of social practices (the unconscious economy, where there is a certain flexibility in the expression of desire and institution) and, practically, to define, in a segregated world, the field of intervention of "people who work to interest themselves in the discourse of the other."

== Works ==
=== Translated into English ===
- Deleuze, Gilles and Félix Guattari. 1972. Anti-Oedipus. Trans. Robert Hurley, Mark Seem and Helen R. Lane. London and New York: Continuum, 2004. Vol. 1 of Capitalism and Schizophrenia. 2 vols. 1972–1980. Trans. of L'Anti-Oedipe. Paris: Les Editions de Minuit. ISBN 0-8264-7695-3.
- 1975. Kafka: Toward a Minor Literature. Trans. Dana Polan. Theory and History of Literature 30. Minneapolis and London: U of Minnesota P, 1986. Trans. of Kafka: pour une littérature mineure. Paris: Les Editions de Minuit. ISBN 0-8166-1515-2.
- 1980. A Thousand Plateaus. Trans. Brian Massumi. London and New York: Continuum, 2004. Vol. 2 of Capitalism and Schizophrenia. 2 vols. 1972–1980. Trans. of Mille plateaux. Paris: Les Editions de Minuit. ISBN 0-8264-7694-5.
- 1991. What Is Philosophy?. Trans. Graham Burchell and Hugh Tomlinson. London and New York: Verso, 1994. Trans. of Qu'est-ce que la philosophie?. Paris: Les Editions de Minuit. ISBN 0-86091-686-3.
- 1979. The Machinic Unconscious: Essays in Schizoanalysis. Trans. Taylor Adkins. Los Angeles, CA: Semiotext(e), 2011. Trans. of L'inconscient machinique: Essais de schizo-analyse. Paris: Recherches. ISBN 2-8622-201-08
- 1977. Molecular Revolution: Psychiatry and Politics. Trans. Rosemary Sheed. Harmondsworth: Penguin, 1984. ISBN 0-14-055160-3.
- 1989a. Schizoanalytic Cartographies. Trans Andrew Goffey. London and New York: Bloomsbury, 2013. Trans. of Cartographies schizoanalytiques. Paris: Editions Galilée ISBN 978-2718603490.
- 1989b. The Three Ecologies. Trans. Ian Pindar and Paul Sutton. London and New York: Continuum, 2000. Trans. of Les trois écologies. Paris: Editions Galilée. ISBN 1-84706-305-5.
- 1992. Chaosmosis: An Ethico-Aesthetic Paradigm. Trans. Paul Bains and Julian Pefanis. Bloomington and Indianapolis: Indiana UP, 1995. Trans. of Chaosmose. Paris: Editions Galilee. ISBN 0-909952-25-6.
- 1995. Chaosophy (Texts and Interviews 1972 to 1977). Ed. Sylvère Lotringer. Semiotext(e) Foreign Agents Ser. New York: Semiotext(e). ISBN 1-57027-019-8.
- 1996. Soft Subversions (Texts and Interviews 1977 to 1985). Ed. Sylvère Lotringer. Trans. David L. Sweet and Chet Wiener. Semiotext(e) Foreign Agents Ser. New York: Semiotext(e). ISBN 1-57027-030-9.
- 1996. The Guattari Reader. Ed. Gary Genosko. Blackwell Readers ser. Oxford and Cambridge, MA: Blackwell. ISBN 0-631-19708-7.
- 2006. The Anti-Oedipus Papers. Ed. Stéphane Nadaud. Trans. Kélina Gotman. New York: Semiotext(e). ISBN 1-58435-031-8.
- 2015. Lines of Flight: For Another World of Possibilities. Bloomsbury Academic. ISBN 978-147250-735-8.
- 2015. Machinic Eros: Writings on Japan. Eds. Gary Genosko and Jay Hetrick. Univocal Publishing. ISBN 978-193756-120-8.
- 2015. Psychoanalysis and Transversality: Texts and Interviews 1955–1971. Trans. Ames Hodges. MIT Press. ISBN 978-158435-127-6
- 2016. A Love of UIQ. Trans. Graeme Thomson and Silvia Maglioni. Minneapolis: University of Minnesota Press. ISBN 978-1-937561-95-6
- Guattari, Félix, and Luiz Inácio Lula da Silva. 2003. The Party Without Bosses: Lessons on Anti-Capitalism From Guattari and Lula. Ed. Gary Genosko. Arbeiter Ring Publishing. ISBN 978-189403-718-1.
- Guattari, Félix and Toni Negri. 1985. Communists Like Us: New Spaces of Liberty, New Lines of Alliance. Trans. Michael Ryan. Semiotext(e) Foreign Agents Ser. New York: Semiotext(e), 1990. Trans. of Nouvelles espaces de liberté. Paris: Bedon. ISBN 0-936756-21-7.
- Guattari, Félix, and Suely Rolnik. 1986. Molecular Revolution in Brazil. New York: Semiotext(e), 2008. Trans. of Micropolitica: Cartografias do Desejo. ISBN 1-58435-051-2.

=== Untranslated ===
Note: Many of the essays found in these works have been individually translated and can be found in the English collections.

- La révolution moléculaire (1977, 1980). The 1980 version (éditions 10/18) contains substantially different essays from the 1977 version.
- Les années d'hiver, 1980–1985 (1986).

Other collaborations

- L'intervention institutionnelle (Paris: Petite Bibliothèque Payot, n. 382 – 1980). On institutional pedagogy. With Jacques Ardoino, G. Lapassade, Gerard Mendel, Rene Lourau.
- Pratique de l'institutionnel et politique (1985). With Jean Oury and Francois Tosquelles.
- Desiderio e rivoluzione. Intervista a cura di Paolo Bertetto (Milan: Squilibri, 1977). Conversation with Franco Berardi (Bifo) and Paolo Bertetto.

== See also ==
- Anti-psychiatry
  - Basaglia Law
  - Deinstitutionalisation
  - Psychiatric reform in Italy
- Criticism of capitalism
- Criticism of psychoanalysis
- Deleuze and Guattari
- History of capitalism
