= Capitalism and Schizophrenia =

Book series by Gilles Deleuze and Felix Guattari

- Authors: Gilles Deleuze; Félix Guattari
- Original title: Capitalisme et Schizophrénie
- Translator: Robert Hurley; Mark Seem; Helen R. Lane; Brian Massumi
- Language: French
- Subjects: Desire, capitalism, psychoanalysis
- Publication date: 1972, 1980
- Publication place: France
- English publication date: 1977, 1987
- Media type: Print (Hardcover and Paperback)

Capitalism and Schizophrenia (French: Capitalisme et Schizophrénie) is a serial composed of two volumes, Anti-Oedipus (1972, translated in 1977) and A Thousand Plateaus (1980, translated in 1987). It was written by the French authors Gilles Deleuze and Félix Guattari, respectively a philosopher and a psychoanalyst, during May 68, a period of civil unrest in France.

== Sources ==
- Deleuze, Gilles and Félix Guattari. 1972. Anti-Œdipus. Trans. Robert Hurley, Mark Seem and Helen R. Lane. London and New York: Continuum, 2004. Vol. 1 of Capitalism and Schizophrenia. 2 vols. 1972–1980. Trans. of L'Anti-Oedipe. Paris: Les Editions de Minuit. ISBN 0-8264-7695-3.
- ---. 1980. A Thousand Plateaus. Trans. Brian Massumi. London and New York: Continuum, 2004. Vol. 2 of Capitalism and Schizophrenia. 2 vols. 1972–1980. Trans. of Mille Plateaux. Paris: Les Editions de Minuit. ISBN 0-8264-7694-5.
- Guattari, Félix. 1984. Molecular Revolution: Psychiatry and Politics. Trans. Rosemary Sheed. Harmondsworth: Penguin. ISBN 0-14-055160-3.
- ---. 1995. Chaosophy. Ed. Sylvère Lotringer. Semiotext(e) Foreign Agents Ser. New York: Semiotext(e). ISBN 1-57027-019-8.
- ---. 1996. Soft Subversions. Ed. Sylvère Lotringer. Trans. David L. Sweet and Chet Wiener. Semiotext(e) Foreign Agents Ser. New York: Semiotext(e). ISBN 1-57027-030-9.
- Massumi, Brian. 1992. A User's Guide to Capitalism and Schizophrenia: Deviations from Deleuze and Guattari. Swerve editions. Cambridge, United States and London: MIT. ISBN 0-262-63143-1.
