= Jean-François Lyotard =

French philosopher, sociologist, and literary theorist (1924-1998)

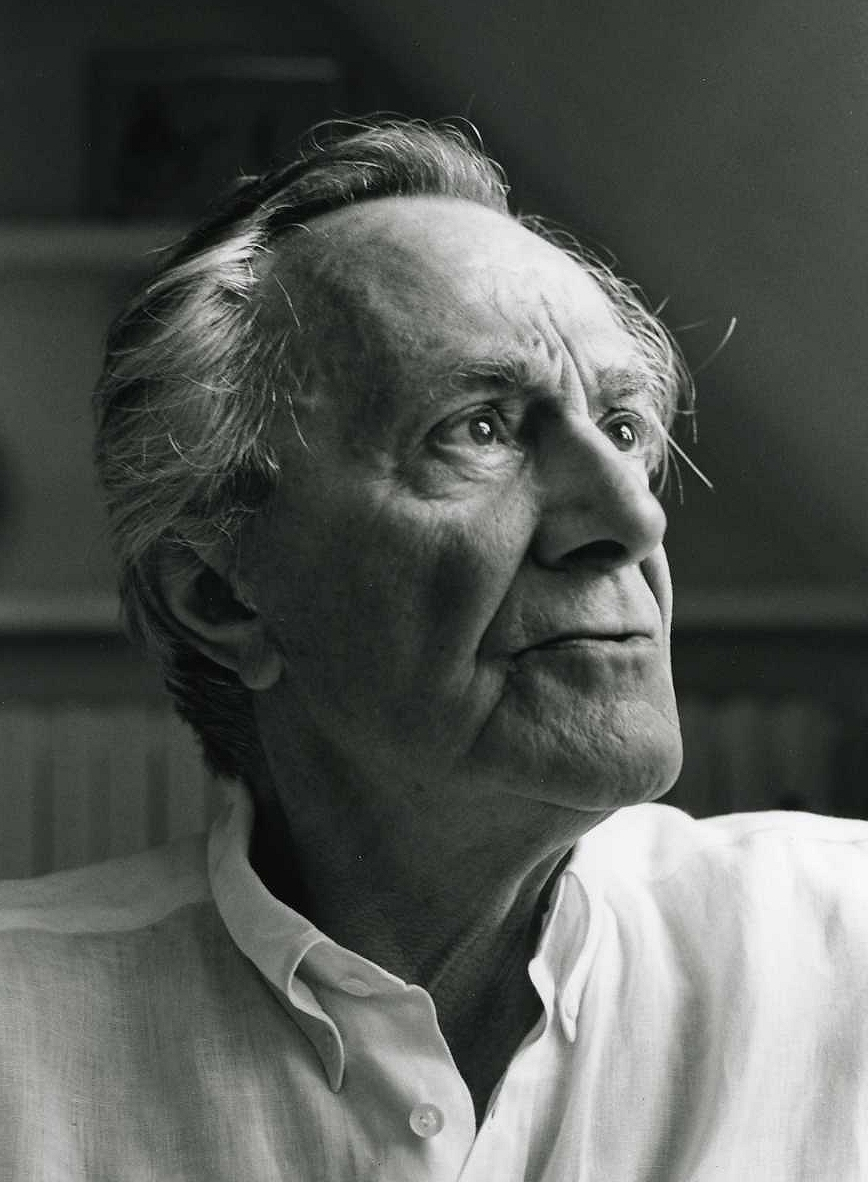
- Lyotard, photo by Bracha L. Ettinger, 1995
- Born: 10 August 1924; Versailles, France
- Died: 21 April 1998 (aged 73); Paris, France
- Other name: "François Laborde"
- Political party: List: Socialisme ou Barbarie (1954–1964); Pouvoir Ouvrier (1964–1966)
- Spouse(s): Andrée May; Dolores Djidzek
- Children: 3

Education
- Education: University of Paris (B.A., M.A.); University of Paris X (DrE, 1971)
- Doctoral advisor: Mikel Dufrenne
- Other advisor: Maurice de Gandillac

Philosophical work
- Era: 20th-century philosophy
- Region: Western philosophy
- School: Continental philosophy Phenomenology (early); Post-Marxism (late); Postmodernism (late)
- Institutions: Lycée d'Aumale (1950–52); Prytanée National Militaire (1952–59); University of Paris (1959–66); University of Paris X (1967–72); Centre national de la recherche scientifique (1968–70); University of Paris VIII (1972–87); Collège International de Philosophie (1984–86); Johns Hopkins University; University of California, San Diego; University of California, Berkeley; University of Wisconsin–Milwaukee; University of California, Irvine (1987–94); Emory University (1994–98); European Graduate School
- Main interests: Epistemology, sociology, political philosophy, aesthetics
- Notable ideas: The "postmodern condition", collapse of the "grand narrative", libidinal economy

Jean-François Lyotard (/liːoʊˈtɑːr/; French: [ʒɑ̃ fʁɑ̃swa ljɔtaʁ]; 10 August 1924 – 21 April 1998) was a French philosopher, sociologist, and literary theorist. His interdisciplinary discourse spans such topics as epistemology and communication, the human body, modern art and postmodern art, literature and critical theory, music, film, time and memory, space, the city and landscape, the sublime, and the relation between aesthetics and politics. He is best known for his articulation of postmodernism after the late 1970s and the analysis of the impact of postmodernity on the human condition. Lyotard was a key personality in contemporary continental philosophy and authored 26 books and many articles. He was a director of the International College of Philosophy founded by Jacques Derrida, François Châtelet, Jean-Pierre Faye, and Dominique Lecourt.

== Biography ==
=== Early life, educational background, and family ===
Jean François Lyotard was born on 10 August 1924, in Versailles, France, to Jean-Pierre Lyotard, a sales representative, and Madeleine Cavalli. He went to school at the Lycée Buffon (1935–42) and Louis-le-Grand, Paris. As a child, Lyotard had many aspirations: to be an artist, a historian, a Dominican friar, and a writer. He later gave up the dream of becoming a writer when he finished writing an unsuccessful fictional novel at the age of 15. Ultimately, Lyotard described the realization that he would not become any of these occupations because of "fate", as he describes in his intellectual biography called Peregrinations, published in 1988.

Lyotard served as a medic during the liberation of Paris in the Second World War, and soon after began studying philosophy at the Sorbonne in the late 1940s, after failing the entrance exam to the more prestigious École normale supérieure twice. His 1947 diplôme d'études supérieures (roughly equivalent to an M.A. thesis) was Indifference as an Ethical Concept (L'indifférence comme notion éthique). It analyzed forms of indifference and detachment in Zen Buddhism, Stoicism, Taoism, and Epicureanism. He studied for the agrégation at the Sorbonne alongside fellow students Gilles Deleuze, François Châtelet and Michel Butor; in 1949 whilst waiting to retake the oral examination, he left Paris to teach at l'École militaire préparatoire d'Autun. Having gained the agrégation in 1950, Lyotard took up a position teaching philosophy at the Lycée d'Aumale (now Lycée Ahmed Reda Houhou) in Constantine in French Algeria but returned to mainland France in 1952 to teach at the Prytanée National Militaire in La Flèche, where he wrote a short work on phenomenology, published in 1954.

In 1959, Lyotard moved to Paris to teach at the Sorbonne: introductory lectures from this time (1964) have been posthumously published under the title Why Philosophize? Having moved to teach at the new campus of Nanterre in 1966, Lyotard participated in the events following March 22 and the tumult of May 1968. In 1971, Lyotard earned a State doctorate with his dissertation Discours, figure under Mikel Dufrenne—the work was published the same year. Lyotard joined the Philosophy department of the experimental University of Vincennes, later Paris 8, together with Gilles Deleuze, in the academic year 1970–71; it remained his academic home in France until 1987. He married his first wife, Andrée May, in 1948 with whom he had two children, Corinne and Laurence, and later married for a second time in 1993 to Dolorès Djidzek, the mother of his son David (born in 1986).

=== Political life ===
In 1954, Lyotard became a member of Socialisme ou Barbarie ("Socialism or Barbarism"), a French political organization formed in 1948 around the inadequacy of the Trotskyist analysis to explain the new forms of domination in the Soviet Union. Socialisme ou Barbarie and the publication of the same name had an objective to conduct a critique of Marxism from within the left, including the dominance of bureaucracy within the French Communist Party and its adherence to the dictats of the Soviet Union. His writings in this period are mostly concerned with far-left politics, with a focus on the Algerian situation—which he witnessed first-hand while teaching philosophy in Constantine. As the principal correspondent on Algeria for Socialisme ou Barbarie, during the period of Algeria's struggle for independence, Lyotard wrote a dozen essays analyzing the economic and political situation (1956–63), which were later reproduced in La Guerre des Algeriens (1989) and translated in Political Writings (1993).

Lyotard hoped to encourage an Algerian fight for independence from France, and a social revolution, actively supporting the FLN in secret, whilst also being critical of its approach. Following disputes with Cornelius Castoriadis in 1964, Lyotard left Socialisme ou Barbarie for the newly formed splinter group Pouvoir Ouvrier ("Worker Power"), from which he resigned in turn in 1966. Although Lyotard played an active part in the May 1968 uprisings, he distanced himself from revolutionary Marxism with his 1974 book Libidinal Economy. He distanced himself from Marxism because he felt that Marxism had a rigid structuralist approach and the Marxists were imposing "systematization of desires" through a strong emphasis on industrial production as the ground culture.

=== Academic career ===
Lyotard taught at the Lycée of Constantine (Lycée d'Aumale), Algeria from 1950 to 1952. In 1952, Lyotard returned to mainland France to teach at the Prytanée National Militaire in La Flèche. He published the book La phénoménologie (Phenomenology) in 1954 and began to write for the journal Socialisme ou Barbarie under the pseudonym François Laborde. Returning to Paris in 1959 Lyotard taught first at the Sorbonne, then moving to its recently created Nanterre campus (University of Paris X) in 1966. In 1970, Lyotard began teaching in the Philosophy department of the Experimental University Centre, Vincennes, which became the University of Paris VIII in 1971; he taught there until 1987 when he became Professor Emeritus. In 1982–83 Lyotard was involved in the foundation of the Collège International de Philosophie, Paris, serving as its second Director in 1985.

Lyotard frequently lectured outside France as visiting professor at universities around the world. From 1974, these included trans-Atlantic visits, including: Johns Hopkins University, University of California, Berkeley, Yale University, Stony Brook University and the University of California, San Diego in the U.S., the Université de Montréal in Quebec (Canada), and the University of São Paulo in Brazil. In 1987 he took a part-time professorship at the University of California, Irvine where he held a joint post with Jacques Derrida and Wolfgang Iser in the Department of Critical Theory. Before his death, he split his time between Paris and Atlanta, where he taught at Emory University as the Woodruff Professor of Philosophy and French from 1995–8. He was also a professor of Media Philosophy at The European Graduate School.

=== Later life and death ===
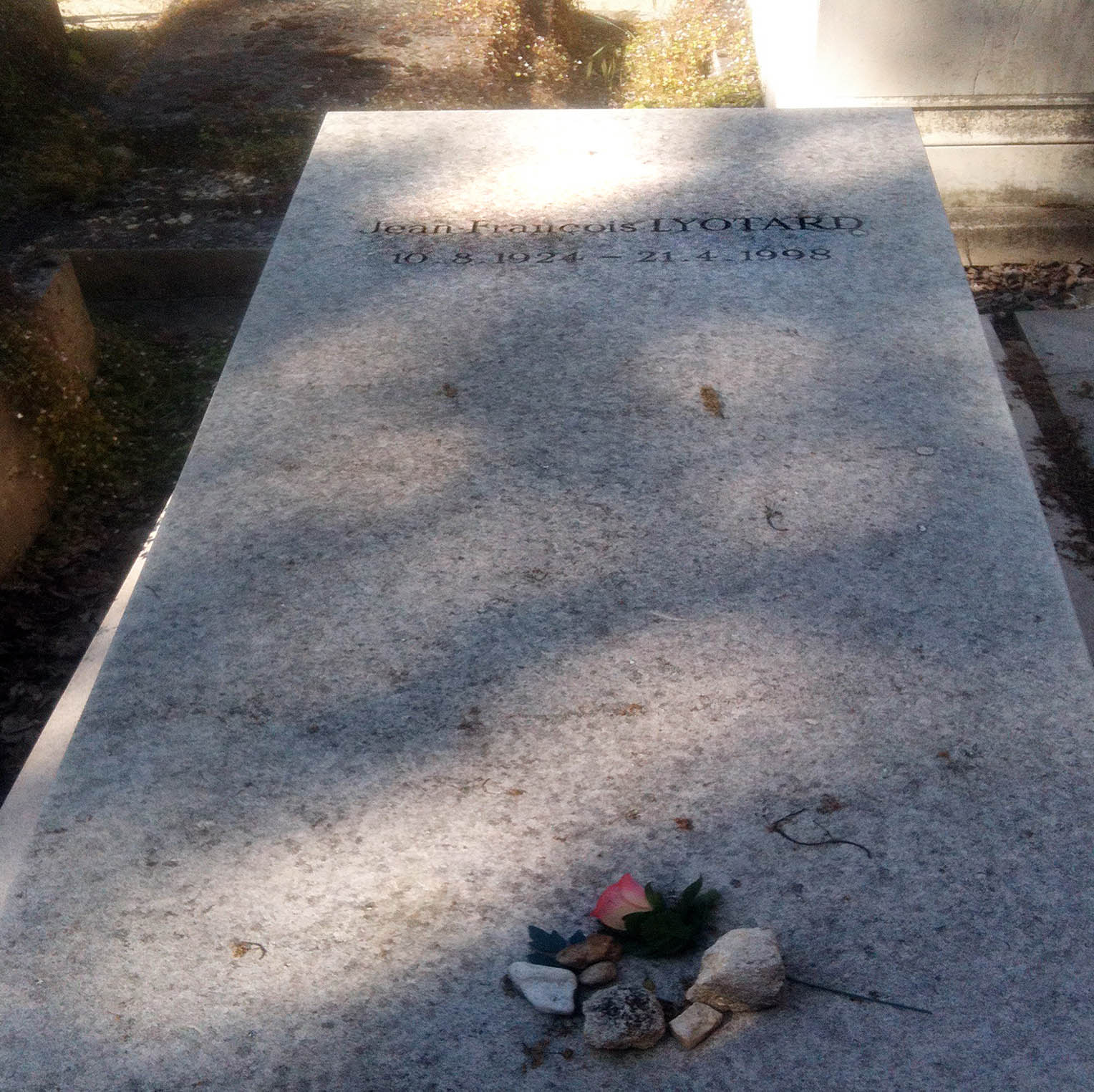
Lyotard's grave at Le Père Lachaise Cemetery in Paris

Later Lyotard works were about French writer, activist, and politician, André Malraux: a biography, Signed, Malraux, and an essay entitled Soundproof Room. Lyotard was interested in the aesthetic views of society that Malraux shared. Another later book was The Confession of Augustine, a study in the phenomenology of time. A work-in-progress, it was published posthumously in the year of Lyotard's death. Two of his later essays on art were on the artwork of artist Bracha L. Ettinger: Anima Minima (Diffracted Traces), 1995, and Anamnesis (L'anamnese), 1997.

Lyotard repeatedly returned to the notion of the Postmodern in essays gathered in English as The Postmodern Explained to Children, Toward the Postmodern, and Postmodern Fables. In 1998, while preparing for a conference on postmodernism and media theory, he died unexpectedly from a case of leukemia that had advanced rapidly. He is buried in Division 6 of Père Lachaise Cemetery in Paris.

== Work ==
Lyotard's work is characterized by a persistent opposition to universals, métarécits (meta-narratives), and generality. He is fiercely critical of many of the "universalist" claims of the Enlightenment, and several of his works serve to undermine the fundamental principles that generate these broad claims.

In his writings of the early 1970s, Lyotard rejects what he regards as theological underpinnings of both Karl Marx and Sigmund Freud: "In Freud, it is Judaical, critical sombre (forgetful of the political); in Marx it is catholic. Hegelian, reconciliatory (...) in the one and in the other the relationship of the economic with meaning is blocked in the category of representation (...) Here a politics, there a therapeutics, in both cases a laical theology, on top of the arbitrariness and the roaming of forces". Consequently, he rejected Theodor W. Adorno's negative dialectics because he viewed them as seeking a "therapeutic resolution in the framework of a religion, here the religion of history." In Lyotard's "libidinal economics" he aimed at "discovering and describing different social modes of investment of libidinal intensities".

=== Academic legacy ===
Throughout his academic career Jean-François Lyotard has contributed to the magazines L'Âge nouveau, Les Temps modernes, Socialisme ou barbarie, Cahiers de philosophie, Esprit, Revue d'esthétique, Musique en jeu, L'Art vivant, Semiotexte, October, Art Press International, Critique, Flash Art, Art Forum, Po&sie, among others.

=== Discourse, Figure (1971) ===
Submitted as his Doctorat d'Etat (Higher State Doctorate), this complex work was not available in English until 2011. It is unusual in form and contents, covering aspects of aesthetics (Merleau-Ponty), linguistics (Benveniste, Lacan), psychoanalysis (Freud), poetry (Michel Butor, Stéphane Mallarmé), and painting (Italian Quattrocento; Paul Cézanne, Paul Klee; Jackson Pollock). The focus shifts from phenomenology to an engagement with psychoanalysis, in order to make the form of the book work differently to the usual expectations for an academic text of the time and to disorientate the reader. Its reception has been delayed in the Anglophone world, missing the importance Lyotard attributed to it, considering it one of his three 'real books' and the principal reference for his discussion of the 'figural' and its tri-part presentation (figure-image; figure-form; figure-matrix).

==== Aesthetics ====
Lyotard's thesis, published under the title Discours, Figure (1971), focused on aesthetics. Lyotard devoted himself a lot to aesthetic issues, in a way that sought to break with the Hegelian perspective, in which art had to think of itself as a materialization of the mind. He believed it was "more a tool to expose often unseen tensions, shifts, and complications in philosophical thinking and its relations with society—a way of helping it depart from doxa without the assurances of higher knowledge or even a sensus communis." Lyotard's thought on modern and contemporary art focused on a few artists who allowed him to emphasize the flagship issues of French thought after the Second World War, particularly those of conceptual mastery of the artist as an author: Paul Cézanne and Wassily Kandinsky as well as Bracha L. Ettinger, Albert Ayme, Daniel Buren, Marcel Duchamp, Valerio Adami, Jacques Monory, Shusaku Arakawa, Ruth Francken, Sam Francis, Barnett Newman, Joseph Kosuth, Karel Appel, René Guiffrey, Manuel Casimiro and Gianfranco Baruchello.

=== Libidinal Economy (1974) ===
In one of his most famous books, Libidinal Economy, Lyotard offers a critique of Marx's idea of "false consciousness" and claims that the 19th-century working class enjoyed being a part of the industrialization process. Lyotard claims that this was due to libidinal energy—the term "libidinal" coming from the term libido, used in psychoanalysis to refer to the desires of a deeper consciousness. Libidinal Economy has been called an achievement in attempting to live with the rejection of all religious and moral principles through an undermining of the structures associated with it. Structures conceal libidinal intensities while intense feelings and desires stave off set structures. However, there also can be no intensities or desires without structures, because there would be no dream of escaping the repressive structures if they did not exist. "Libidinal energy comes from this disruptive intervention of external events within structures that seek order and self-containment." This was the first of Lyotard's writings that had really criticized a Marxist view. It achieved great success, but was also the last of Lyotard's writings on this particular topic where he really opposed the views of Marx.

=== The Postmodern Condition (1979) ===
Lyotard is a skeptic of modern cultural thought. According to his 1979 The Postmodern Condition: A Report on Knowledge, the impact of the postmodern condition was to provoke skepticism about universalizing theories. Lyotard argues that people have outgrown their needs for metanarratives (French: métarécits), likely due to the advancement of techniques and technologies since World War II and redeployment of advanced liberal capitalism (i.e., neoliberalism). He argues against the possibility of justifying the narratives that bring together disciplines and social practices, such as science and culture; according to James Williams, for Lyotard "the narratives we tell to justify a single set of laws and stakes are inherently unjust." Lyotard further claims "even under fascism, politics is a matter of opinions and hence values." A loss of faith in metanarratives has an effect on how people view science, art, and literature. Little narratives have now become the appropriate way for explaining social transformations and political problems. Lyotard argues that this is the driving force behind postmodern science. As metanarratives fade, science suffers a loss of faith in its search for truth, and therefore must find other ways of legitimating its efforts. Connected to this scientific legitimacy is the growing dominance for information machines. Lyotard argues that one day, in order for knowledge to be considered useful, it will have to be converted into computerized data. Years later, this led him into writing his book The Inhuman, published in 1988, in which he illustrates a world where technology has taken over.

=== The collapse of the "grand narrative" and "language-games" ===
In La Condition postmoderne: Rapport sur le savoir (The Postmodern Condition: A Report on Knowledge) (1979), Lyotard proposes what he calls an extreme simplification of the "postmodern" as an 'incredulity towards meta-narratives'. These meta-narratives—sometimes 'grand narratives'—are grand, large-scale theories and philosophies of the world, such as the progress of history, the knowability of everything by science, and the possibility of absolute freedom. Lyotard argues that people have ceased to believe that narratives of this kind are adequate to represent and contain human multiplicity. He points out that no one seemed to agree on what, if anything, was real and everyone had their own perspective and story. People have become alert to difference, diversity, the incompatibility of human aspirations, beliefs, and desires, and for that reason postmodernity is characterized by an abundance of micronarratives. For this concept, Lyotard draws from the notion of "language-games" found in the work of Ludwig Wittgenstein. Lyotard notes that it is based on the mapping of society according to the concept of the language games.

In Lyotard's works, the term "language games", sometimes also called "phrase regimens", denotes the multiplicity of communities of meaning, the innumerable and incommensurable separate systems in which meanings are produced and rules for their circulation are created. This involves, for example, an incredulity towards the metanarrative of human emancipation, the story of how the human race has set itself free, bringing together the language game of science, the language game of human historical conflicts, and the language game of human qualities into the overall justification of the steady development of the human race in terms of wealth and moral well-being.

According to this metanarrative, the justification of science is related to wealth and education. The development of history is seen as steady progress towards civilization or moral well-being. The language game of human passions, qualities and faults (cf. character flaws (narratives)), is seen as steadily shifting in favor of qualities and away from faults as science and historical developments help to conquer faults in favor of qualities. The point is that any event ought to be able to be understood in terms of the justifications of this metanarrative; anything that happens can be understood and judged according to the discourse of human emancipation. For example, for any new social, political or scientific revolution, people could ask themselves the question, "Is this revolution a step towards the greater well-being of the mass of human beings?" It should always be possible to answer this question in terms of the rules of justification of the metanarrative of human emancipation.

This becomes more crucial in Au juste: Conversations (Just Gaming) (1979) and Le Différend (The Differend) (1983), which develop a postmodern theory of justice. It might appear that the atomization of human beings implied by the notion of the micronarrative and the language game suggests a collapse of ethics. It has often been thought that universality is a condition for something to be a properly ethical statement: "thou shalt not steal" is an ethical statement in a way that "thou shalt not steal from Margaret" is not. The latter is too particular to be an ethical statement (what's so special about Margaret?); it is only ethical if it rests on a universal statement ("thou shalt not steal from anyone"). But universals are impermissible in a world that has lost faith in metanarratives, and so it would seem that ethics is impossible. Justice and injustice can only be terms within language games, and the universality of ethics is out of the window. Lyotard argues that notions of justice and injustice do in fact remain in postmodernism. The new definition of injustice is indeed to use the language rules from one "phrase regimen" and apply them to another. Ethical behavior is about remaining alert precisely to the threat of this injustice, about paying attention to things in their particularity and not enclosing them within abstract conceptuality. One must bear witness to the "differend". In a differend, there is a conflict between two parties that cannot be solved in a just manner. However, the act of being able to bridge the two and understand the claims of both parties, is the first step towards finding a solution.

"I would like to call a differend the case where the plaintiff is divested of the means to argue and becomes for that reason a victim. If the addressor, the addressee, and the sense of the testimony are neutralized, everything takes place as if there were no damages. A case of differend between two parties takes place when the regulation of the conflict that opposes them is done in the idiom of one of the parties while the wrong suffered by the other is not signified in that idiom."

In more than one book, Lyotard promoted what he called a new paganism. Plato, in Book II of the Republic, condemns pagans for their shape-shifting and deceitful gods, antithetical to universal truth. Lyotard prefers a mirror image of Plato's critique, vindicating the pagans as Plato sees them. A new paganism would revolt against a Greek masculinist paganism, such as that of Plato. The revolt would be led by women, for woman is anti-rational and anti-philosophical (Platonic understanding). Woman, as "the little girl", is "the antonym of the adult male questioner" and would serve as a release from the mental illness evident in Platonic philosophy, in Judaism and in the American, French and Russian revolutions.

=== The Differend (1983) ===
In The Differend, based on Immanuel Kant's views on the separation of Understanding, Judgment, and Reason, Lyotard identifies the moment in which language fails as the differend, and explains it as follows: "...the unstable state and instant of language wherein something which must be able to be put into phrases cannot yet be… the human beings who thought they could use language as an instrument of communication, learn through the feeling of pain which accompanies silence (and of pleasure which accompanies the invention of a new idiom)". Lyotard undermines the common view that the meanings of phrases can be determined by what they refer to (the referent). The meaning of a phrase—an event (something happens)—cannot be fixed by appealing to reality (what actually happened). Lyotard develops this view of language by defining "reality" in an original way, as a complex of possible senses attached to a referent through a name. The correct sense of a phrase cannot be determined by a reference to reality, since the referent itself does not fix sense, and reality itself is defined as the complex of competing senses attached to a referent. Therefore, the phrase event remains indeterminate.

Lyotard uses the example of Auschwitz and the revisionist historian Robert Faurisson's demands for proof of the Holocaust to show how the differend operates as a double bind. Faurisson argued that "the Nazi genocide of 6 million Jewish people was a hoax and a swindle, rather than a historical fact" and that "he was one of the courageous few willing to expose this wicked conspiracy". Faurisson will only accept proof of the existence of gas chambers from eyewitnesses who were themselves victims of the gas chambers. However, any such eyewitnesses are dead and are not able to testify. Either there were no gas chambers, in which case there would be no eyewitnesses to produce evidence, or there were gas chambers, in which case there would still be no eyewitnesses to produce evidence, because they would be dead. Since Faurisson will accept no evidence for the existence of gas chambers, except the testimony of actual victims, he will conclude from both possibilities (gas chambers existed and gas chambers did not exist) that gas chambers did not exist. This presents a double bind. There are two alternatives, either there were gas chambers or there were not, which lead to the same conclusion: there were no gas chambers (and no final solution). The case is a differend because the harm done to the victims cannot be presented in the standard of judgment upheld by Faurisson.

=== The sublime ===
Lyotard was a frequent writer on aesthetic matters. He was, despite his reputation as a postmodernist, a great promoter of modernist art. Lyotard saw postmodernism as a latent tendency within thought throughout time and not a narrowly limited historical period. He favored the startling and perplexing works of the high modernist avant-garde. In them he found a demonstration of the limits of human conceptuality, a valuable lesson for anyone too imbued with Enlightenment confidence. Lyotard has written extensively also on many contemporary artists of his choice: Valerio Adami, Daniel Buren, Marcel Duchamp, Jacques Monory, Ruth Francken, Shusaku Arakawa, Bracha Ettinger, Sam Francis, Karel Appel, Barnett Newman, René Guiffrey, Gianfranco Baruchello, and Albert Ayme as well as on earlier artists, notably Paul Cézanne and Paul Klee.

He developed these themes in particular by discussing the sublime. The "sublime" is a term in aesthetics whose fortunes revived under postmodernism after a century or more of neglect. It refers to the experience of pleasurable anxiety that people experience when confronting wild and threatening sights like, for example, a massive craggy mountain, black against the sky, looming terrifyingly. A sublime is the conjunction of two opposed feelings, which makes it harder to see the injustice of it, or a solution to it.

Lyotard found particularly interesting the explanation of the sublime offered by Immanuel Kant in his Critique of Judgment (Kritik der Urtheilskraft, more exactly Critique of the Power of Judgment), where Kant explains this mixture of anxiety and pleasure in these terms: There are two kinds of sublime experience. In the mathematically sublime, an object strikes the mind in such a way that people find themselves unable to take it in as a whole. More precisely, they experience a clash between their reason (which tells them that all objects are finite) and the imagination (the aspect of the mind that governs perception, and which sees an object incalculably larger than themselves, and feels infinite). In the dynamically sublime, the mind recoils at an object so immeasurably more powerful than the individual, whose weight, force, scale could crush a person without the remotest hope of being able to resist it. (Kant stresses that if a person is in actual danger, their feeling of anxiety is very different from that of a sublime feeling. The sublime is an aesthetic experience, not a practical feeling of personal danger.) This explains the feeling of anxiety.

What is deeply unsettling about the mathematically sublime is that the mental faculties that present visual perceptions to the mind are inadequate to the concept corresponding to it; in other words, what people are able to make themselves see cannot fully match up to what they know is there. They know it is a mountain but they cannot take the whole thing into their perception. Human sensibility is incapable of coping with such sights, but reason can assert the finitude of the presentation. With the dynamically sublime, the sense of physical danger should prompt an awareness that humans are not just physical material beings, but moral and (in Kant's terms) noumenal beings as well. The body may be dwarfed by its power but reason need not be. This explains, in both cases, why the sublime is an experience of pleasure as well as pain.

Lyotard is fascinated by this admission, from one of the philosophical architects of the Enlightenment, that the mind cannot always organize the world rationally. Some objects are simply incapable of being brought neatly under concepts. For Lyotard, in Lessons on the Analytic of the Sublime, but drawing on his argument in The Differend, this is a good thing. Such generalities as "concepts" fail to pay proper attention to the particularity of things. What happens in the sublime is a crisis experience in the relationship of imagination and reason, and this witnessed inadequacy, says Lyotard, is actually the differend; the straining of the mind at the edges of itself and at the edges of its conceptuality.

=== Les Immatériaux (1985) ===
In 1985, Lyotard co-curated the exhibition Les Immatériaux at the Centre de Création Industrielle at the Centre Georges Pompidou in Paris, together with the design theorist and curator Thierry Chaput. At that point, Les Immatériaux was the largest exhibition held at the Centre Georges Pompidou. The exhibition was framed in a pre-1989 context that predicted globalization to be a melancholy foreshadowing of contemporary art's shifting function in the era of increasing transnational exchange, and as a turning point in a history of exhibits in the aftermath of what was formerly known as aesthetics.

John Rajchman says this about the exhibition: "We might imagine Les Immatériaux as an extravagant staging of a peculiar moment in the role of information in the history of aesthetics after so-called ‘modernism’, yet before the ‘contemporary’ configuration of biennials that was already taking shape in the 1990s, within or against which the question of a new ‘history of exhibition’ now itself arises." In 2023 a display about the exhibition was held at the Centre Georges Pompidou, including examples of some of the works included, a selection of films shown at the original accompanying ciné immatériaux programme, and a virtual re-creation of the exhibition featuring remastered sound from the original exhibition sound track.

=== The Inhuman (1988) ===
In his book, The Inhuman, Lyotard explores the philosophy of Kant, Heidegger, Adorno, and Derrida, as well as the works of modernist and postmodernist artists like Cézanne, Debussy, and Boulez, in a wide-ranging debate. Time and memory, the sublime and the avant-garde, and the link between aesthetics and politics are all topics Lyotard addresses in the book. In his study he analyzes the close but problematic ties between modernity, development, and humanity, as well as the shift to postmodernity. The job of literature, philosophy, and the arts, according to Lyotard, is to give witness to and explain this arduous shift.

Lyotard rejected classical humanism mainly because he paradoxically assumes that the humane is something that every person has inherently from birth but can only be realized through education. Lyotard essentially asks if humanity is so inherent to all humans, can it only be gained by undergoing education? By using the concept of the inhuman, Lyotard described all those things that humanism has excluded from its definition of man.

He developed a science-fiction thought experiment that would take place in 4.5 billion years, at the time of the explosion of the sun. Should the human species put itself in the position to live on without Earth, and if so what would then remain of "humanity"? Everything that is of importance for the determination of what is "human" would fall away if the human species began living an extra-planetary existence. Lyotard's opinion on this remained divided: on the one hand, he criticized the dehumanizing effects of modern technology that can already be observed today; on the other hand, he saw in them the chance to open up a space of possibilities, since they do not fix the human being to one image.

=== Readings in Infancy (1991) ===
First published by Galilée, Paris, in 1991 the volume appeared in full English translation in 2023 (Bloomsbury) edited by Robert Harvey and Kiff Bamford. This is a collection of essays on works by key figures from literature, politics and psychoanalysis: James Joyce; Franz Kafka; Hannah Arendt; Jean-Paul Sartre; Paul Valéry; Sigmund Freud are the vehicles for a meditation on the speechless infans of infancy (enfance). Read together, these chapters form an investigation into the area of research which preoccupied Lyotard throughout the last two decades of his life, named here as infantia, the infancy of thought: that which resists development, whether human, capitalist or technological. As Lyotard writes in the chapter 'Voices: Freud': "Writing has a debt of affect which it despairs of ever being able to pay off."

=== "Mainmise" ===
Lyotard was impressed by the importance of childhood in human life, which he saw as providing the opportunity of creativity, as opposed to the settled hubris of maturity. In "Mainmise" (1992), however, he also explored the hold of childhood experience on the individual through the (Roman) concept of mancipium, an authoritative right of possession. Because parental influences affect the new-born before it has the linguistic skill even to articulate them, let alone oppose them, Lyotard considered that "We are born from others but also to others, given over defenseless to them. Subject to their mancipium." The essay "Mainmise" was collected in the 1993 publication D'un trait d'union (The Hyphen: Between Judaism and Christianity, 1999) together with 'On a Hyphen' and responses and correspondence with Eberhard Gruber. In France it was also collected in the posthumously published collection "Misère de la philosophie" (The Poverty of Philosophy, no English translation available) edited by Dolorès Lyotard.

== Criticism ==
There are three major criticisms of Lyotard's work. Each coincides with a school of thought. Jacques Derrida and Jean-Luc Nancy have written deconstructions of Lyotard's work (Derrida 1992; Nancy 1985). They focus on Lyotard's postmodern work and on The Differend in particular. A differend depends upon a distinction drawn between groups that itself depends upon the heterogeneity of language games and genres of discourse. Why should these differences be privileged over an endless division and reconstruction of groups? In concentrating on specific differences, Lyotard's thought becomes overly dependent on differences; between categories that are given as fixed and well defined. From the point of view of deconstruction, Lyotard's philosophy gives too much credit to illegitimate categories and groups. Underlying any differend there is a multiplicity of further differences; some of these will involve crossing the first divide, others will question the integrity of the groups that were originally separated.

Manfred Frank (1988) has put the Frankfurt School criticism best. He attacks Lyotard's search for division over consensus on the grounds that it involves a philosophical mistake with serious political and social repercussions. Lyotard has failed to notice that an underlying condition for consensus is also a condition for the successful communication of his own thought. It is a performative contradiction to give an account that appeals to reason on behalf of a difference that is supposed to elude it. So, in putting forward a false argument against a rational consensus, Lyotard plays into the hands of the irrational forces that often give rise to injustice. Worse, he is then only in a position to testify to that injustice, rather than put forward a just and rational resolution. In turn, these criticisms have been met with responses arguing that Frank misreads Lyotard's work, for example, failing to recognize the role of the sublime, as well as failing to see that Lyotard wants to go beyond the monopoly of the cognitive, argumentative genre, in order to give other genres a right to exist as well.

From a Nietzschean and Deleuzian point of view (James Williams 2000), Lyotard's postmodern philosophy took a turn toward a destructive modern nihilism that his early work avoids.

Charles J. Stivale reviewed Lyotard's The Differend (in English translation) in 1990, stating:

Jean-François Lyotard's is a dense work of philosophical, political and ethical reflection aimed at a specialized audience versed in current debates in logic, pragmatics and post-structuralism. Even George Van Den Abbeele's excellent translation, complete with a glossary of French terms not available in the original text (Paris: Minuit, 1983), does not, indeed cannot, alleviate the often terse prose with which Lyotard develops his reasoning. With this said, I must also observe that this work is of vital importance in a period when revisionism of all stripes attempts to rewrite, and often simply deny, the occurrence of historical and cultural events, i.e. in attempting to reconstruct "reality" in the convenient names of "truth" and "common sense" … This overview must leave unexplored the broad philosophical bases from which Lyotard draws support, as well as important questions that he raises regarding history, justice and critical judgement. I can conclude only by suggesting that this work, despite the formidable difficulties inherent to its carefully articulated arguments, offers readers a rich formulation of precise questions for and about the current period of critical transition and re-opening in philosophy, ethics and aesthetics.

== Influence ==
The collective tribute to Lyotard following his death was organized by the Collège International de Philosophie, and chaired by Dolorès Lyotard and Jean-Claude Milner, the College's director at that time. The proceedings were published by PUF in 2001 under the general title Jean-François Lyotard, l'exercice du différend.

Lyotard's work continues to be important in politics, philosophy, sociology, literature, art, and cultural studies. To mark the tenth anniversary of Lyotard's death, an international symposium about Jean-François Lyotard organized by the Collège International de Philosophie (under the direction of Dolorès Lyotard, Jean-Claude Milner and Gerald Sfez) was held in Paris from January 25–27 in 2007.

== Miscellaneous ==
- In Pierre Gripari's novel Pierrot la lune, he writes about a Lyotard, who is given the name "Jef" in the novel, saying that he was the only person with whom he could open up about his homosexuality: "I do not understand Jef, but I need him."
- In a 1984 interview with Georges Van Den Abbeele, Lyotard discusses how he views all the work he's published as rough drafts, noting that, "Even Le différend (1984), which I spent nine years elaborating and writing, remains a sketch, whose master I have not been. And in this sense, I can without lying plead limited responsibility. That is to say: a reader cannot incorrectly locate in a piece of writing an aspect which, according to me, is not at all there."
- Lyotard was quoted as having privately said, in a conversation with David Hawkes, that "capital is the enemy".
- A short study (176 pp) of Lyotard's life and work by Kiff Bamford is published in the series Critical Lives by Reaktion Books, London; it is the only biography of Lyotard currently available.

== Selected publications ==
- Phenomenology. Trans. Brian Beakley. Albany: State University of New York Press, 1991 [La Phénoménologie. Paris: Presses universitaires de France, 1954], ISBN 978-0-7914-0805-6.
- Discourse, Figure. Trans. Antony Hudek and Mary Lydon. Minneapolis: University of Minnesota Press, 2011 [Discours, figure. Paris: Klincksieck, 1971], ISBN 978-0816645657.
- Libidinal Economy. Trans. Iain Hamilton Grant. Bloomington: Indiana University Press, 1993 [Économie libidinale. Paris: Éditions de Minuit, 1974], ISBN 978-0253207289.
- Duchamp's TRANS/formers. Trans. Ian McLeod. California: Lapis Press, 1990 [Les transformateurs Duchamp. Paris: Editions Galilée, 1977], ISBN 978-0932499639.
- Just Gaming. Trans. Wlad Godzich. Minneapolis: University of Minnesota Press, 1985 [Au juste: Conversations. Paris: Christian Bourgois, 1979], ISBN 978-0816612772.
- The Postmodern Condition: A Report on Knowledge. Trans. Geoffrey Bennington and Brian Massumi. Minneapolis: University of Minnesota Press, 1984 [La Condition postmoderne: Rapport sur le savoir. Paris: Éditions de Minuit, 1979], ISBN 978-0816611737.
- Pacific Wall. Trans. Bruce Boone. California: Lapis Press, 1989 [Le mur du pacifique. Paris: Editions Galilée, 1979].
- The Differend: Phrases in Dispute. Trans. Georges Van Den Abbeele. Minneapolis: University of Minnesota Press, 1988 [Le Différend. Paris: Éditions de Minuit, 1983].
- The Assassination of Experience by Painting – Monory. Trans. Rachel Bowlby. London: Black Dog, 1998 [L’Assassinat de l’expérience par la peinture, Monory. Bègles: Castor Astral, 1984].
- Driftworks. Ed. Roger McKeon. New York: Semiotext(e), 1984. [Essays and interviews dating from 1970 to 1972.]
- Enthusiasm: The Kantian Critique of History. Trans. George Van Den Abbeele. Stanford: Stanford University Press, 2009 [L'enthousiasme, la critique kantienne de l'histoire. Paris: Galilée, 1986].
- The Postmodern Explained: Correspondence, 1982–1985. Ed. Julian Pefanis and Morgan Thomas. Trans. Don Barry. Minneapolis: University of Minnesota Press, 1993 [Le Postmoderne expliqué aux enfants: Correspondance, 1982–1985. Paris: Galilée, 1986].
- The Inhuman: Reflections on Time. Trans. Geoffrey Bennington and Rachel Bowlby. Stanford, CA: Stanford University Press, 1991 [L’Inhumain: Causeries sur le temps. Paris: Galilée, 1988].
- Heidegger and "the jews." Trans. Andreas Michael and Mark S. Roberts. Minneapolis: University of Minnesota Press, 1990 [Heidegger et "les juifs." Paris: Galilée, 1988].
- The Lyotard Reader. Ed. Andrew Benjamin. Oxford: Blackwell, 1989.
- Peregrinations: Law, Form, Event. New York: Columbia University Press, 1988 [Pérégrinations: Loi, forme, événement. Paris: Galilée, 1990].
- Lessons on the Analytic of the Sublime: Kant's Critique of Judgment, §§ 23–29. Trans. Elizabeth Rottenberg. Stanford, CA: Stanford University Press, 1994 [Leçons sur l’"Analytique du sublime": Kant, "Critique de la faculté de juger," paragraphes 23–29. Paris: Galilée, 1991].
- The Hyphen: Between Judaism and Christianity. Trans. Pascale-Anne Brault and Michael Naas. Amherst, NY: Humanity Books, 1999 [Un trait d’union. Sainte-Foy, Quebec: Le Griffon d’argile, 1993].
- Political Writings. Trans. Bill Readings and Kevin Paul Geiman. Minneapolis: University of Minnesota Press, 1993. [Political texts composed 1956–1989.]
- Postmodern Fables. Trans. Georges Van Den Abbeele. Minneapolis: University of Minnesota Press, 1997 [Moralités postmodernes. Paris: Galilée, 1993].
- Toward the Postmodern. Ed. Robert Harvey and Mark S. Roberts. Atlantic Highlands, NJ: Humanities Press, 1993. [Essays composed 1970–1991].
- Signed, Malraux. Trans. Robert Harvey. Minneapolis: University of Minnesota Press, 1999 [Signé Malraux. Paris: B. Grasset, 1996].
- The Politics of Jean-François Lyotard. Ed. Chris Rojek and Bryan S. Turner. New York: Routledge, 1998.
- The Confession of Augustine. Trans. Richard Beardsworth. Stanford, CA: Stanford University Press, 2000 [La Confession d’Augustin. Paris: Galilée, 1998].
- Soundproof Room: Malraux's Anti-Aesthetics. Trans. Robert Harvey. Stanford, CA: Stanford University Press, 2001 [Chambre sourde: L’Antiesthétique de Malraux. Paris: Galilée, 1998].
- Jean-François Lyotard : Writings on Contemporary Art and Artists, Six volumes. Ed. Herman Parret, Leuven: Leuven University Press, 2010–2013.
- Jean-François Lyotard: The Interviews and Debates. Ed. Kiff Bamford. London and New York: Bloomsbury Academic, 2020.
- Readings in Infancy. Ed. Robert Harvey and Kiff Bamford. London and New York: Bloomsbury Academic, 2023.
- Lyotard's Interviews on Les Immatériaux. Ed. Andreas Broeckmann and Sergio Meijide Casas, Les Immatériaux Research, Working Paper No. 11, 2024. (PDF)
- Jean-François Lyotard: The Later Interviews and Debates. Ed. Kiff Bamford. London and New York: Bloomsbury Academic, 2025. ISBN 978-1-350-35741-9

== See also ==
- Jean Beaufret
