= Libidinal Economy =

1974 book by Jean-François Lyotard

- Cover of the first edition
- Author: Jean-François Lyotard
- Original title: Économie Libidinale
- Translator: Iain Hamilton Grant
- Language: French
- Subjects: Desire; political economy; nihilism
- Publisher: Les Éditions de Minuit, Indiana University Press
- Publication date: 1974
- Publication place: France
- English publication date: 1993
- Media type: Print (hardcover and paperback)
- Pages: 275 (English edition)
- ISBN: 978-0253207289
- Preceded by: Discourse, Figure
- Followed by: Duchamp's TRANS/formers

Libidinal Economy (French: Économie Libidinale) is a 1974 book by French philosopher Jean-François Lyotard. The book was composed following the ideological shift of the May 68 protests in France, whereupon Lyotard distanced himself from conventional critical theory and Marxism because he felt that they were still too structuralist and imposed a rigid "systematization of desires".

Drastically changing his writing style and turning his attention to semiotics, theories of libido, economic history and erotica, he repurposed Sigmund Freud's idea of libidinal economy as a more complex and fluid concept that he linked to political economy, and proposed multiple ideas in conjunction with it. Alongside Gilles Deleuze and Félix Guattari's Anti-Oedipus, Libidinal Economy has been seen as an essential post-May 68 work in a time when theorists in France were radically reinterpreting psychoanalysis, and critics have argued that the book is free of moral or political orientation. Lyotard subsequently abandoned its ideas and views, later describing it as his "evil book" (livre méchant, literally "nasty book").

== Summary ==
Lyotard appropriates various ideas of Freud's, in particular his idea of libidinal economy by which libido flows, like a form of energy, through a structure of drives, while also using his idea of polymorphous perversity and appropriating Jacques Lacan's idea of jouissance to detail how masses of intensities form. He also introduces ideas of his own, such as a "great ephemeral skin" or "libidinal band," which serves as a surface of reality, harboring signs through which libidinal intensities pass; the "tensor", a nihilist semiotic idea that stands for a sign with no "unitary designation, meaning, or calculable series of such designations or meanings"; "great" zeros (which correspond to Lacan's master signifier) and "concentratory" zeros (which correspond to Karl Marx's notion of capital). These ideas are used to discuss relations of force, flow and intensity in philosophy and economics, while mainly asserting that theory, because of its "immobility", has never adequately described or caught up to these relations. Lyotard concludes the book by proposing in a revolutionary manner that thinkers should "stay put, but quietly seize every chance to function as good intensity-conducting bodies."

=== Discussed authors ===
Alongside wildly varying references, Lyotard incorporates the work of Marx (in particular his theory of organic and inorganic bodies), Fredrich Nietzsche and Ferdinand de Saussure in this context of this appropriation of Freudian ideas, as well as the perverse sexuality displayed in the fiction of the Marquis de Sade and Georges Bataille. The economic work of John Maynard Keynes is deployed to, in the context of libidinal economy, define credit and interest as circuits of intensity. Lacan, Deleuze and Guattari and Jean Baudrillard are evoked pertaining to the aftermath of May 68; while being indifferent to their ideological concerns, he points out both similarities and differences between his work and that of Baudrillard, but argues against him that "every political economy is libidinal", and against his use of historical materialism, writes that "there are no primitive societies".

== Publication history ==
Libidinal Economy was first published in 1974 by Les Éditions de Minuit. In 1993, it was published in the philosopher Iain Hamilton Grant's English translation by Indiana University Press.

== Legacy and reception ==
Commentators have compared Libidinal Economy to Deleuze and Guattari's Anti-Oedipus. The philosopher Peter Dews argues that Libidinal Economy, while part of a phase of Lyotard's thought less well-known than Anti-Oedipus in the English-speaking world, is important for its "treatment of the problem of the appropriate reaction to the erosion of the traditional" caused by "the incessant expansion of capitalist economic relations". He also praises Lyotard's critique of Lacan; however, he argues that because Lyotard rejects Deleuze and Guattari's idea of opposing "good" revolutionary desire to "bad" fascist desire, Libidinal Economy is "bereft of any political or moral orientation". He notes that Lyotard subsequently rejected ideas he had advocated in the book, in order to discuss a "post-modern concept of justice", arguing that this could be considered an attempt by Lyotard to "make amends" for its "implicit amoralism". Dews suggests that Lyotard too quickly rejected the perspective advanced in the work. The term "accelerationism" was first coined by professor and author Benjamin Noys in his 2010 book The Persistence of the Negative to describe the theoretical trajectory of certain post-structuralist works embracing unorthodox Marxist and counter-Marxist overviews of capitalism, such as Anti-Oedipus, Libidinal Economy and Jean Baudrillard's Symbolic Exchange and Death.

The philosopher Douglas Kellner writes that Libidinal Economy and Anti-Oedipus were both key texts in the "micropolitics of desire" advocated by some French intellectuals in the 1970s; according to Kellner, the "micropolitics of desire" advocates revolutionary change in practices of everyday life as a way of providing "the preconditions for a new society". He contrasts Lyotard's views with those of Baudrillard, noting that the latter eventually abandoned the "micropolitics of desire". Grant compares Libidinal Economy to the philosopher Jacques Derrida's Of Grammatology (1967), the philosopher Luce Irigaray's Speculum of the Other Woman (1974), and Baudrillard's Symbolic Exchange and Death (1976), as well as to Anti-Oedipus, noting that like them it forms part of post-structuralism, a response to the demise of structuralism as a dominant intellectual discourse. He writes that the book is less well-known than Derrida's work, and that Dews's critique of it reflects a widespread view of it, that it drew a hostile response from Marxists, and that Lyotard himself was subsequently critical of it; however, he also notes that Lyotard is reported as having seen it as one of his key works, alongside Discourse, Figure (1971) and The Differend (1983).

Simon Malpas suggests that the book is Lyotard's most important early work available in English translation, crediting Lyotard with providing "fascinating discussions of Freud, Marx and capitalism". He observes that as of 1993, the book was generating increasing interest among critics who have given attention to the work Lyotard produced before becoming interested in postmodernism. Anthony Elliott argues that Lyotard's ideas are problematic from the standpoint of critical psychoanalytic theory, and involve questionable assumptions about human subjectivity and agency. In his view, Lyotard's "celebration of the energetic component of the unconscious is achieved at the cost of displacing the vital role of representation in psychic life" and his contention that representation is a local effect of libidinal intensities "erases the fundamental stress upon representation in Freud's interpretation of the self." Endorsing Dews's criticism of the work, he concludes that Lyotard's concept of libidinal intensities is not useful for "critical social analysis". The philosopher Alan D. Schrift writes that Libidinal Economy reflects the passion surrounding the events of May 1968 in France, as well as disappointment with the Marxist response to those events.

== See also ==
- Accelerationism
- Eros and Civilization
- Nick Land
