= Postmodern philosophy =

Philosophical movement

Postmodern philosophy is a philosophical movement that arose in the second half of the 20th century as a critical response to assumptions allegedly present in modernist philosophical ideas regarding culture, identity, history, or language that were developed during the 18th-century Age of Enlightenment. Postmodernist thinkers developed concepts like différance, repetition, trace, and hyperreality to subvert "grand narratives", univocity of being, and epistemic certainty. Postmodern philosophy questions the importance of power relationships, personalization, and discourse in the "construction" of truth and world views. Many postmodernists appear to deny that an objective reality exists, and appear to deny that there are objective moral values.

Jean-François Lyotard defined philosophical postmodernism in The Postmodern Condition, writing "Simplifying to the extreme, I define postmodern as incredulity towards meta narratives...." where what he means by metanarrative is something like a unified, complete, universal, and epistemically certain story about everything that is. Postmodernists reject metanarratives because they reject the conceptualization of truth that metanarratives presuppose. Postmodernist philosophers in general argue that truth is always contingent on historical and social context rather than being absolute and universal and that truth is always partial and "at issue" rather than being complete and certain.

Postmodern philosophy is often particularly skeptical about simple binary oppositions characteristic of structuralism, emphasizing the problem of the philosopher cleanly distinguishing knowledge from ignorance, social progress from reversion, dominance from submission, good from bad, and presence from absence.

== Subjects ==
=== On literature ===
Postmodern philosophy has had strong relations with the substantial literature of critical theory, although some critical theorists such as Jürgen Habermas have opposed postmodern philosophy.

=== On the Enlightenment ===
Many postmodern claims are critical of certain eighteenth-century Enlightenment values. Postmodern writings often focus on deconstructing the role that power and ideology play in shaping discourse and belief. Postmodern philosophy shares ontological similarities with classical skeptical and relativistic belief systems.

=== On truth and objectivity ===
According to David Novitz, philosophical postmodernism challenges the notion that truth can be achieved. The Routledge Encyclopedia of Philosophy states that "The assumption that there is no common denominator in 'nature' or 'truth' ... that guarantees the possibility of neutral or objective thought" is a key assumption of postmodernism. The Stanford Encyclopedia of Philosophy describes it as "a set of critical, strategic and rhetorical practices employing concepts such as difference, repetition, the trace, the simulacrum, and hyperreality to destabilize other concepts such as presence, identity, historical progress, epistemic certainty, and the univocity of meaning." The National Research Council has characterized the belief that "social science research can never generate objective or trustworthy knowledge" as an example of a postmodernist belief. Jean-François Lyotard's seminal 1979 The Postmodern Condition stated that its hypotheses "should not be accorded predictive value in relation to reality, but strategic value in relation to the questions raised". Lyotard's statement in 1984 that "I define postmodern as incredulity toward meta-narratives" extends to incredulity toward science. Jacques Derrida, who is generally identified as a postmodernist, stated that "every referent, all reality has the structure of a differential trace". There are strong similarities with post-modernism in the work of Paul Feyerabend; Feyerabend held that modern science is no more justified than witchcraft, and has denounced the "tyranny" of "abstract concepts such as 'truth', 'reality', or 'objectivity', which narrow people's vision and ways of being in the world". Defenders of postmodernism state that many descriptions of postmodernism exaggerate its antipathy to science; for example, Feyerabend denied that he was "anti-science", accepted that some scientific theories are superior to other theories (even if science itself is not superior to other modes of inquiry), and attempted conventional medical treatments during his fight against cancer.

== Influences ==
Postmodern philosophy was greatly influenced by the writings of Søren Kierkegaard and Friedrich Nietzsche in the 19th century and other early-to-mid 20th-century philosophers, including the phenomenologist Martin Heidegger, the psychoanalyst Jacques Lacan, cultural critic Roland Barthes, theorist Georges Bataille, and the later work of Ludwig Wittgenstein.

Postmodern philosophy also drew from the world of the arts and architecture, particularly Marcel Duchamp, John Cage, and artists who practiced collage.

== Postmodern philosophers ==
=== Michel Foucault ===
Michel Foucault is often cited as an early postmodernist although he personally rejected that label. Following Nietzsche, Foucault argued that knowledge is produced through the operations of power, and changes fundamentally in different historical periods.

=== Jean Baudrillard ===
Baudrillard, known for his simulation theory, argued that the individual's experience and perception of reality derives its basis entirely from media-propagated ideals and images. The real and fantasy become indistinguishable, leading to the emergence of a wide-spread simulation of reality.

=== Jean François Lyotard ===
The writings of Lyotard were largely concerned with the role of narrative in human culture, and particularly how that role has changed as people have left modernity and entered a "postindustrial" or postmodern condition. He argued that modern philosophies legitimized their truth-claims not (as they themselves claimed) on logical or empirical grounds, but rather on the grounds of accepted stories (or "metanarratives") about knowledge and the world—comparing these with Wittgenstein's concept of language-games. He further argued that with the postmodern condition, these metanarratives no longer work to legitimize truth-claims. He suggested that in the wake of the collapse of modern metanarratives, people are developing a new "language-game"—one that does not make claims to absolute truth but rather celebrates a world of ever-changing relationships (among people and between people and the world).

=== Jacques Derrida ===
Derrida, the father of deconstruction, practiced philosophy as a form of textual criticism. He criticized Western philosophy as privileging the concept of presence and logos, as opposed to absence and markings or writings.

==== Gilles Deleuze on productive difference ====
The work of Gilles Deleuze developed a concept of difference as a productive mechanism, rather than as a merely negative phenomenon. He advocated for a critique of reason that emphasizes sense and affect over rational judgment. Following Nietzsche, Deleuze argued that philosophical critique is an encounter between thought and what forces it into action, and that this requires training, discipline, inventiveness, and even a certain "cruelty". He believed that thought cannot activate itself, but needs external forces to awaken and move it. Art, science, and philosophy can provide such activation through their transformative and experimental nature.

=== Richard Rorty ===
In the United States, a well-known pragmatist and self-proclaimed postmodernist was Richard Rorty. An analytic philosopher, Rorty believed that combining Willard Van Orman Quine's criticism of the analytic-synthetic distinction with Wilfrid Sellars's critique of the "Myth of the Given" allowed for an abandonment of the view of the thought or language as a mirror of a reality or an external world. Further, drawing upon Donald Davidson's criticism of the dualism between conceptual scheme and empirical content, he challenges the sense of questioning whether people's particular concepts are related to the world in an appropriate way, whether people can justify their ways of describing the world as compared with other ways. He argued that truth was not about getting it right or representing reality, but was part of a social practice and language was what served communicative purposes in a particular time; ancient languages are sometimes untranslatable into modern ones because they possess a different vocabulary and are unuseful today. Donald Davidson is not usually considered a postmodernist, although he and Rorty have both acknowledged that there are few differences between their philosophies.

=== Douglas Kellner ===
Douglas Kellner insists that the "assumptions and procedures of modern theory" must be forgotten. Kellner analyzes the terms of this theory in real-life experiences and examples. Kellner uses science and technology studies as a major part of his analysis; he urges that the theory is incomplete without it. The scale is larger than just postmodernism alone; it must be interpreted through cultural studies where science and technology studies play a large role. The reality of the 11 September attacks on the United States of America is the catalyst for his explanation. In response, Kellner continues to examine the repercussions of understanding the effects of the 11 September attacks. He questions if the attacks are only able to be understood in a limited form of postmodern theory due to the level of irony. The conclusion he depicts is simple: postmodernism, as most use it today, will decide what experiences and signs in one's reality will be one's reality as they know it.

== Criticism ==
Some criticism responds to postmodernist skepticism towards objective reality and claims that truth and morality are relative, including the argument that this relativism is self-contradictory. In part in reference to postmodernism, conservative English philosopher Roger Scruton wrote, "A writer who says that there are no truths, or that all truth is 'merely relative,' is asking you not to believe him. So don't." In 2014, the philosophers Theodore Schick and Lewis Vaughn wrote: "the statement that 'No unrestricted universal generalizations are true' is itself an unrestricted universal generalization. So if relativism in any of its forms is true, it's false." Some responses to postmodernist relativism argue that, contrary to its proponents' usual intentions, it does not necessarily benefit the political left. For example, the historian Richard J. Evans argued that if relativism rejects truth, it can legitimize far-right pseudohistory such as Holocaust denial.

Further lines of criticism are that postmodernist discourse is characterized by obscurantism, that the term itself is vaguely defined, and that postmodernism lacks a clear epistemology. The linguist and philosopher Noam Chomsky accused postmodernist intellectuals of failing to meaningfully answer questions such as "what are the principles of their theories, on what evidence are they based, what do they explain that wasn't already obvious, etc.?"

The French psychotherapist and philosopher, Félix Guattari, rejected its theoretical assumptions by arguing that the structuralist and postmodernist visions of the world were not flexible enough to seek explanations in psychological, social, and environmental domains at the same time. In an interview with Truls Lie, Jean Baudrillard noted: "[Transmodernism, etc.] are better terms than "postmodernism". It is not about modernity; it is about every system that has developed its mode of expression to the extent that it surpasses itself and its own logic. This is what I am trying to analyze." "There is no longer any ontologically secret substance. I perceive this to be nihilism rather than postmodernism."

== See also ==
- Hyperreality
- Natural philosophy
- Ontological pluralism
- Physical ontology
- Postmaterialism
- Postmodern art
- Postmodernism
- Postmodernity
