= Lessons on the Analytic of the Sublime =

1991 book by Jean-François Lyotard

- Cover of the first edition
- Author: Jean-François Lyotard
- Original title: Leçons sur l'Analytique du Sublime
- Translator: Elizabeth Rottenberg
- Language: French
- Series: Meridian: Crossing Aesthetics
- Subject: Critique of Judgment
- Publisher: Éditions Galilée, Stanford University Press
- Publication date: 1991
- Publication place: France
- English publication date: 1994
- Media type: Print (Hardcover and Paperback)
- Pages: 264 (1994 Stanford University Press edition)
- ISBN: 978-0804722421

Lessons on the Analytic of the Sublime (French: Leçons sur l'Analytique du Sublime) is a 1991 book written by Jean-François Lyotard about the philosopher Immanuel Kant's Critique of Judgment (1790), focusing on Kant's description of the sublime.The book received positive reviews following the appearance of its English translation in 1994.

== Summary ==
Lyotard discusses the philosopher Immanuel Kant's Critique of Judgment, focusing on Kant's description of the sublime.

== Publication history ==
Lessons on the Analytic of the Sublime was first published in 1991 by Éditions Galilée. In 1994, Stanford University Press published an English translation by Elizabeth Rottenberg as part of the series Meridian: Crossing Aesthetics.

== Reception ==
The book received positive reviews from Thomas Huhn in Journal of Aesthetics and Art Criticism and A. T. Nuyen in Philosophy of the Social Sciences. Huhn described the book as "brilliant", writing that Lyotard provided a "provocative reading of Kant's doctrine of the sublime". Nuyen credited Lyotard with providing a "close and careful" discussion of portions of the Critique of Judgment.

Peter Fenves praised Lyotard for posing the "question of the subject of aesthetic judgment" with "renewed vigor". The philosopher Alan D. Schrift suggested that Lessons on the Analytic of the Sublime is Lyotard's most important work since The Differend (1983).
