= Metanarrative =

Overarching narrative

In social theory, a metanarrative (also master narrative, or meta-narrative and grand narrative; French: métarécit or grand récit) is an overarching narrative about smaller historical narratives, which offers a society legitimation through the anticipated completion of a (as yet unrealized) master idea. The term was popularized by the writing of French philosopher Jean-François Lyotard in 1979. Metanarrative is considered a foundational concept of postmodernism.

Master narrative and synonymous terms like metanarrative are also used in narratology to mean "stories within stories," as coined by literary theorist Gérard Genette.

Examples of master narratives can be found in U.S. high school textbooks according to scholar Derrick Alridge: "history courses and curricula are dominated by such heroic and celebratory master narratives as those portraying George Washington and Thomas Jefferson as the heroic 'Founding Fathers,' Abraham Lincoln as the 'Great Emancipator,' and Martin Luther King, Jr., as the messianic savior of African Americans."

== Etymology ==
"Meta" is Greek for "beyond"; "narrative" is a story that is characterized by its telling (it is communicated somehow).

Although first used earlier in the 20th century, the term was brought into prominence by Jean-François Lyotard in 1979, with his claim that the postmodern was characterized precisely by mistrust of the "grand narratives" (such as ideas about Progress, Enlightenment, Emancipation, and Marxism) that had formed an essential part of modernity. Metanarrative may be related and is often used interchangeably with metafiction but there is a distinction. The latter foregrounds or discloses the fictionality of a narrative while metanarrative does not undercut fiction.

== Lyotard's thesis ==
In The Postmodern Condition: A Report on Knowledge (1979), Lyotard highlights the increasing skepticism of the postmodern condition toward the supposed universality ("totalizing nature") of metanarratives and their reliance on some form of "transcendent and universal truth":

Simplifying to the extreme, I define postmodern as incredulity toward metanarratives. ... The narrative function is losing its functors, its great hero, its great dangers, its great voyages, its great goal. It is being dispersed in clouds of narrative language ... Where, after the metanarratives, can legitimacy reside?

Lyotard and other poststructuralist thinkers (like Michel Foucault) view this as a broadly positive development. They assert that attempts to construct grand theories unduly dismiss the natural chaos and disorder of the universe, and the power of an individual event.

Sociology.org.uk (primarily the personal blog of Chris Livesey, as sustained over perhaps 12 years, in parallel to a long career in sociology education) states that it is unclear whether Lyotard's work is describing a global condition of skepticism towards metanarratives in postmodernity, or prescribing such skepticism. Lyotard's critics emphasize that metanarratives continue to play a major role in the postmodern world.

=== Lyotard's proposal ===
Lyotard proposed that metanarratives should give way to petits récits, or more modest and "localized" narratives, which can "throw off" a grand narrative by bringing into focus a singular event. Borrowing from the works of Wittgenstein and his theory of the "models of discourse", Lyotard constructs his vision of a progressive politics, grounded in the cohabitation of a whole range of diverse and always locally legitimated language-games; multiple narratives coexisting. Lyotard drew from Wittgenstein's notion of the language-game to reveal the multiplicity of meanings found within different contexts, including the meanings' impact on people's understanding of truth. The key concepts of Lyotard's thesis include:

- Skepticism of Universal Truths based on the postmodernist view criticism of the single narrative that can encompass all aspects of human life and experience;
- Fragmentation of Knowledge or "little narratives" that are more modest, fragmented, and specified to particular contexts.

Postmodernists attempt to replace metanarratives by focusing on specific local contexts as well as on the diversity of human experience. They argue for the existence of a "multiplicity of theoretical standpoints" rather than for grand, all-encompassing theories.

=== Criticism of Lyotard's thesis ===
Johannes Willem Bertens and Douwe Fokkema argued that, in so far as one of Lyotard's targets was science, he was mistaken in thinking that science relies upon a grand narrative for social and epistemic validation, rather than on the accumulation of many lesser narrative successes.

Lyotard himself also criticized the scientific content of his thesis and referred to it as "simply the worst of all my books."

== In narratology and communication ==
Metanarrative has a specific definition in narratology and communications theory. According to John Stephens and Robyn McCallum, a metanarrative "is a global or totalizing cultural narrative schema which orders and explains knowledge and experience" – a story about a story, encompassing and explaining other "little stories" within conceptual models that assemble the "little stories" into a whole. Postmodern narratives will often deliberately disturb the formulaic expectations such cultural codes provide, pointing thereby to a possible revision of the social code.

In communication and strategic communication, a master narrative (or metanarrative) is a "transhistorical narrative that is deeply embedded in a particular culture". A master narrative is therefore a particular type of narrative, which is defined as a "coherent system of interrelated and sequentially organized stories that share a common rhetorical desire to resolve a conflict by establishing audience expectations according to the known trajectories of its literary and rhetorical form".

The Consortium for Strategic Communication also maintains a website on master narratives.

Others have related metanarratives to masterplots, "recurrent skeletal stories, belonging to cultures and individuals that play a powerful role in questions of identity, values, and the understanding of life."

== See also ==
- Antifoundationalism
- Eschatology
- Dispensationalism
- Local knowledge
- Metafiction
- Metacognition
- Neopragmatism
- New historicism
- Political narrative
- Speculative philosophy
- Thick description
- World view
