= Critique of Judgment =

1790 book by Immanuel Kant

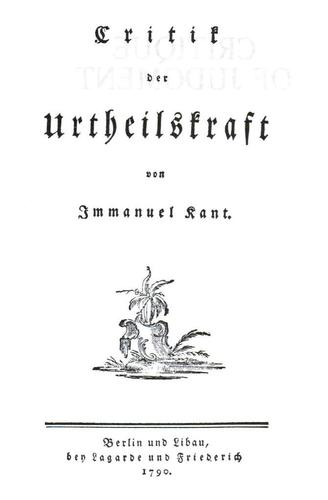
- Title page of the 1790 original work
- Author: Immanuel Kant
- Original title: Critik der Urtheilskraft ^{a}
- Language: German
- Subjects: Aesthetics; Teleology
- Published: 1790
- Publication place: Germany
- Media type: Print
- ^{a} Kritik der Urteilskraft in contemporary German.

The Critique of Judgment (German: Kritik der Urteilskraft), also translated as the Critique of the Power of Judgment, is a 1790 book by the German philosopher Immanuel Kant. Sometimes referred to as the "third critique", the Critique of Judgment follows the Critique of Pure Reason (1781) and the Critique of Practical Reason (1788).

== Context ==
Immanuel Kant's Critique of Judgment is the third critique in Kant's Critical project begun in the Critique of Pure Reason and the Critique of Practical Reason (the First and Second Critiques, respectively). The book is divided into two main sections: the Critique of Aesthetic Judgment and the Critique of Teleological Judgment, and also includes a large overview of the entirety of Kant's Critical system, arranged in its final form. The so-called First Introduction was not published during Kant's lifetime, for Kant wrote a replacement for publication.

The Critical project, that of exploring the limits and conditions of knowledge, had already produced the Critique of Pure Reason, in which Kant argued for a Transcendental Aesthetic, an approach to the problems of perception in which space and time are argued not to be objects. The First Critique argues that space and time provide ways in which the observing subject's mind organizes and structures the sensory world. The end result of this inquiry in the First Critique is that there are certain fundamental antinomies in the dialectical use of Reason, most particularly that there is a complete inability to favor on the one hand the argument that all behavior and thought is determined by external causes, and on the other that there is an actual "spontaneous" causal principle at work in human behavior.

The first position, of causal determinism, is adopted, in Kant's view, by empirical scientists of all sorts; moreover, it led to the Idea (perhaps never fully to be realized) of a final science in which all empirical knowledge could be synthesized into a full and complete causal explanation of all events possible to the world.

The second position, of spontaneous causality, is implicitly adopted by all people as they engage in moral behavior; this position is explored more fully in the Critique of Practical Reason.

The Critique of Judgment constitutes a discussion of the place of Judgment itself, which must overlap both the Understanding ("Verstand") (whichsoever operates from within a deterministic framework) and Reason ("Vernunft") (which operates on the grounds of freedom).

== Judgments of taste ==
The first half of Kant's book presents what Kant calls the four moments of the "Judgment of Taste". These are given by Kant in sequence as the (1) First Moment. Of the Judgment of Taste: Moment of Quality"; (2) Second Moment. Of the Judgment of Taste: Moment of Quantity"; (3) Third Moment: Of Judgment of Taste: Moment of the Relation of the ends brought under Review in such Judgments"; and (4) Fourth Moment: Of the Judgment of Taste: Moment of the Modality of the Delight in the Object". After the presentation of the four moments of the Judgment of Taste, Kant then begins his discussion of Book 2 of the Third Critique titled Analytic of the Sublime.

== Aesthetic judgments ==
The first half of the book aims to distinguish the judgment of taste properly speaking – judgments of beauty and of the sublime – from judgments of agreeableness and goodness. Judgments of taste are distinctive to the extent that they are grounded in the faculty of judgment in its reflective use alone and is merely contemplative, as opposed to the agreeable and the good, which rely on the existence of the object in order to satisfy us.

"Reflective judgments" differ from determinative judgments (those of the first two critiques). In reflective judgment we seek to find unknown universals for given particulars; whereas in determinative judgment, we just subsume given particulars under universals that are already known, as Kant puts it:

It is then one thing to say, "the production of certain things of nature or that of collective nature is only possible through a cause which determines itself to action according to design"; and quite another to say, "I can according to the peculiar constitution of my cognitive faculties judge concerning the possibility of these things and their production, in no other fashion than by conceiving for this a cause working according to design, i.e. a Being which is productive in a way analogous to the causality of an intelligence." In the former case I wish to establish something concerning the Object, and am bound to establish the objective reality of an assumed concept; in the latter, Reason only determines the use of my cognitive faculties, conformably to their peculiarities and to the essential conditions of their range and their limits. Thus the former principle is an objective proposition for the determinant Judgment, the latter merely a subjective proposition for the reflective Judgment, i.e. a maxim which Reason prescribes to it.

The agreeable is a purely sensory judgment — judgments in the form of "This steak is good," or "This chair is soft." These are purely subjective judgments, based on inclination alone.

The good is essentially a judgment that something is ethical — the judgment that something conforms with moral law, which, in the Kantian sense, is essentially a claim of modality — a coherence with a fixed and absolute notion of reason. It is in many ways the absolute opposite of the agreeable, in that it is a purely objective judgment — things are either moral or they are not, according to Kant.

The remaining two judgments — the beautiful and the sublime — differ from both the agreeable and the good. They are what Kant refers to as "subjective universal" judgments. This apparently oxymoronic term means that, in practice, the judgments are subjective, and are not tied to any absolute and determinate concept. However, the judgment that something is beautiful or sublime is made with the belief that other people ought to agree with this judgment — even though it is known that many will not. The force of this "ought" comes from a reference to a sensus communis — a community of taste. Hannah Arendt, in her Lectures on Kant's Political Philosophy, suggests the possibility that this sensus communis might be the basis of a political theory that is markedly different from the one that Kant lays out in the Metaphysics of Morals.

The central concept of Kant's analysis of the judgment of beauty is what he called the ″free play″ between the cognitive powers of imagination and understanding. We call an object beautiful, because its form fits our cognitive powers and enables such a ″free play″ (§22) the experience of which is pleasurable to us. The judgment that something is beautiful is a claim that it possesses the "form of finality" — that is, that it appears to have been designed with a purpose, even though it does not have any apparent practical function. We also do not need to have a determinate concept for an object in order to find it beautiful (§9). In this regard, Kant further distinguishes between free and adherent beauty. Whereas judgments of free beauty are made without having one determinate concept for the object being judged (e.g. an ornament or well-formed line), a judgment of beauty is adherent if we do have such a determined concept in mind (e.g. a well-built horse that is recognized as such). The main difference between these two judgments is that purpose or use of the object plays no role in the case of free beauty. In contrast, adherent judgments of beauty are only possible if the object is not ill-suited for its purpose.

The judgment that something is sublime is a judgment that it is beyond the limits of comprehension — that it is an object of fear. However, Kant makes clear that the object must not actually be threatening — it merely must be recognized as deserving of fear.

Kant's view of the beautiful and the sublime is frequently read as an attempt to resolve one of the problems left following his depiction of moral law in the Critique of Practical Reason — namely that it is impossible to prove that we have free will, and thus impossible to prove that we are bound under moral law. The beautiful and the sublime both seem to refer to some external noumenal order — and thus to the possibility of a noumenal self that possesses free will.

In this section of the critique Kant also establishes a faculty of mind that is in many ways the inverse of judgment — the faculty of genius. Whereas judgment allows one to determine whether something is beautiful or sublime, genius allows one to produce what is beautiful or sublime.

== Teleology ==
The second half of the Critique discusses teleological judgment. This way of judging things according to their ends (telos: Greek for end) is logically connected to the first discussion at least regarding beauty but suggests a kind of (self-)purposiveness (that is, meaningfulness known by one's self).

Kant writes about the biological as teleological, claiming that there are things, such as living beings, whose parts exist for the sake of their whole and their whole for the sake of their parts. This allows him to open a gap in the physical world: since these "organic" things cannot be brought under the rules that apply to all other appearances, what are we to do with them?

Kant says explicitly that while efficiently causal explanations are always best (x causes y, y is the effect of x), it is absurd to hope for "another Newton" who could explain a blade of grass without invoking teleology, and so the organic must be explained "as if" it were constituted as teleological. This portion of the Critique is, from some modern theories, where Kant is most radical; he posits man as the ultimate end, that is, that all other forms of nature exist for the purpose of their relation to man, directly or not, and that man is left outside of this due to his faculty of reason. Kant claims that culture becomes the expression of this, that it is the highest teleological end, as it is the only expression of human freedom outside of the laws of nature. Man also garners the place as the highest teleological end due to his capacity for morality, or practical reason, which falls in line with the ethical system that Kant proposes in the Critique of Practical Reason and the Groundwork of the Metaphysics of Morals.

Kant attempted to legitimize purposive categories in the life sciences, without a theological commitment. He recognized the concept of purpose has epistemological value for finality, while denying its implications about creative intentions at life and the universe's source. Kant described natural purposes as organized beings, meaning that the principle of knowledge presupposes living creatures as purposive entities. He called this supposition the finality concept as a regulative use, which satisfies living beings specificity of knowledge. This heuristic framework claims there is a teleology principle at purpose's source and it is the mechanical devices of the individual original organism, including its heredity. Such entities appear to be self-organizing in patterns. Kant's ideas allowed Johann Friedrich Blumenbach and his followers to formulate the science of types (morphology) and to justify its autonomy.

Kant held that there was no purpose represented in the aesthetic judgment of an object's beauty. A pure aesthetic judgment excludes the object's purpose.

Lewis White Beck suggests that Kant's "Antinomy of Teleological Judgment" can also be interpreted as a radical revision of his initial attempt to resolve the antinomy between the concepts of freedom and determinism which he first presented in the Critique of Pure Reason.

== Influences ==
Though Kant consistently maintains that the human mind is not an "intuitive understanding"—something that creates the phenomena which it cognizes—several of his readers (starting with Fichte, culminating in Schelling) believed that it must be (and often give Kant credit).

Kant's discussions of schema and symbol late in the first half of the Critique of Judgment also raise questions about the way the mind represents its objects to itself, and so are foundational for an understanding of the development of much late 20th-century continental philosophy: Jacques Derrida is known to have studied the book extensively.

In Truth and Method (1960), Hans-Georg Gadamer rejects Kantian aesthetics as ahistorical in his development of a historically-grounded hermeneutics.

== Schopenhauer's comments ==
Arthur Schopenhauer noted that Kant was concerned with the analysis of abstract concepts, rather than with perceived objects. "...he does not start from the beautiful itself, from the direct, beautiful object of perception, but from the judgment [someone’s statement] concerning the beautiful...."

Kant was strongly interested, in all of his critiques, with the relation between mental operations and external objects. "His attention is specially aroused by the circumstance that such a judgement is obviously the expression of something occurring in the subject, but is nevertheless as universally valid as if it concerned a quality of the object. It is this that struck him, not the beautiful itself."

The book's form is the result of concluding that beauty can be explained by examining the concept of suitableness. Schopenhauer stated that "[T]hus we have the queer combination of the knowledge of the beautiful with that of the suitableness of natural bodies into one faculty of knowledge called power of judgement, and the treatment of the two heterogeneous subjects in one book."

Kant is inconsistent, according to Schopenhauer, because "...after it had been incessantly repeated in the Critique of Pure Reason that the understanding is the ability to judge, and after the forms of its judgements are made the foundation–stone of all philosophy, a quite peculiar power of judgement now appears which is entirely different from that ability."

With regard to teleological judgment, Schopenhauer claimed that Kant tried to say only this: "...although organized bodies necessarily seem to us as though they were constructed according to a conception of purpose which preceded them, this still does not justify us in assuming it to be objectively the case." This is in accordance with Kant's usual concern with the correspondence between subjectivity (the way that we think) and objectivity (the external world). Our minds want to think that natural bodies were made by a purposeful intelligence, like ours.

== See also ==
Books

- Lessons on the Analytic of the Sublime
- The Differend
- La Vérité en Peinture

People

- Jean-François Lyotard
- Hannah Arendt

Topics

- Aesthetic distance
- "Critique of the Kantian Philosophy"

== Bibliography ==
- Immanuel Kant, Critique of Judgment, Translated by J. H. Bernard, New York: Hafner Publishing, 1951. (Original publication date 1892)
- Immanuel Kant, Critique of Judgement, Translated by James Creed Meredith, Oxford: Oxford University Press, 2007 (original publication date 1952), Oxford World's Classics. ISBN 978-0-19-280617-8. Among the reprints of this translation, in volume 42 of Great Books of the Western World
- Immanuel Kant, Critique of Judgement, Translated by Werner S. Pluhar, Hackett Publishing Co., 1987, ISBN 0-87220-025-6
- Immanuel Kant, Critique of the Power of Judgment, Edited by Paul Guyer, translated by Paul Guyer and Eric Mathews, Cambridge and New York: Cambridge University Press, 2000. The Cambridge Edition of the Works of Immanuel Kant. ISBN 0-521-34447-6
- Immanuel Kant, Kritik der Urteilskraft, ed. by Heiner F. Klemme, Felix Meiner Verlag, 2006.
- Arthur Schopenhauer, The World as Will and Representation, Volume I, Dover Publications, 1969, ISBN 0-486-21761-2
