= Pragmatic constructivism =

Pragmatic constructivism (PC) is a philosophical framework of how people create, utilise and share intelligence about the world in which they exist, in order to take successful action. To do so they construct a framework they consider reality to guide their action.

PC is centrally build upon Ludwig Wittgenstein's work on Language games and can provide a normative template on how to act successfully in a given world context, thereby providing a basis for learning how to improve action i.e. becoming more successful. PC can be used to devise conceptual and theoretical frameworks for human activities and can provide a basis on which they can be defended and justified.

== History and background ==
Pragmatic constructivism has been developed by philosophy and management scholars throughout past decades. Main philosophical perspectives such empiricism, rationalism, existentialism and philosophy of language all play an important role in the idea of integration. The most important underlying inspiration is, however, the late Wittgenstein's philosophy of language. More specifically PC emerged in the 70s from the endeavors of various interdisciplinary research groups in philosophy and various social sciences connected to Aalborg University to produce problem-relevant research by implementing various Nordic action research approaches combined with inspirations from notably J. L. Austin, H.-G. Gadamer and J. Habermas. PC ideas can be traced to L. Nørreklit 1978, the philosophical driver of the framework, the actor-based methodology ideas in 1983, and the logical structures of the social essential for the construction of possibilities. The first presentation of integration of the four dimensions of reality below is presented in L. Nørreklit 1991, and further developed and applied in publications in 2004, 2006 and 2007 - in which the theory was termed constructivist pragmatism (2006) and adjusted to pragmatic constructivism (2007).

PC is developed by a research network that started to emerge in 2006 and presented its theory of reality construction as an integrated relational complex of the four dimensions in conjunction with a variety of PC based case studies. This presentation also includes the theory of co-narration and leadership as conductorship. Since then the network has worked on further developing theory and applicability of PC resulting in amongst other the learning theory of truth, the theory of generalization, construct causality, coherence and merger of reality constructs, the concept of the social factory and the impact of the differentiation between practice and reductivist control languages (as in IT), a theory of values and the language game of goodness including the ethics of the good versus the ethics of the best. It has also inspired investigations into organizational sustainability and corporate reporting.

== Reality construction ==
The philosophy of PC is concerned with the understanding and controlling the conditions sufficient for actions to succeed to inspire to a better living. To do this it produces a framework for how people construct and influence their reality.

=== Reality and world ===
The reality construct is produced by people and guides their activities in the world. Thus people are considered actors constantly influencing relations and intervening with the activities of other people:

“Although reality and world are related concepts and often used as if they have the same meaning, they do not at all mean the same things and cannot be used interchangeably without confusing theoretical consequences. The world includes all things, events or states of affairs that exist, irrespective of whether we know they exist or not. ... To be is to be in the world. It does not matter what kind of phenomenon it is, ... Although more and more things in our life-world are constructed, the world itself, i.e. the universe, is still not constructed. ... It was there before we were born into it. We know only a small fraction of that which it contains, but its existence is a condition for us and for our constructions. Accordingly, 'world' is an inclusive concept. It includes everything that exists. 'World' is also a realistic concept meaning that the world and its phenomena, including our constructions, exist independently of our recognition of them.”

In PC, the differences between the concepts ‘reality’ and ‘world’ is consequential for theory as well as practice. The concept ‘world’ is inclusive: it includes everything that exists, and everything that it includes is real. It includes all real constructs they be physical, cognitive or social. It includes fictions and illusions but not that which the fictions and illusions are about. It “includes all things, events or states of affairs that exist, irrespective of whether we know they exist or not."

=== Learning theory of Truth ===
PC considers truth as a concept that is based on the ability of learning. Learning is the process of analysing and reducing the "truth gap", i.e. the gap between the "pro-active truth" and the "pragmatic truth". The claims given prior to action are considered "pro-active truth." They are based on existing knowledge and believed to 'correspond to the world'. Their meaning produces expectations as to what will happen under specified conditions. Pragmatic truth is what actually happens if the conditions are satisfied. The conditions may be initiated by the actions of actors or accidentally through developing circumstances. Eventual difference between the proactive and the pragmatic truth is the truth gap which is subject to analysis and learning. While real stories can be traced back to evidence and thus enable real learning, fictions are revealed by not being able to enable such tracing.

== Integration ==
=== The four Dimensions ===
In PC, integration is a central concept. The human 'being in the world' is controlled by the relational construct - called reality - in which four dimensions well integrated constitute reality and enable the person to function effectively as actor. The four dimensions are the factual basis, possibilities, values and the communication. Insufficient integration of these dimensions make the reality construct produce illusions, making it difficult for actors to understand and avoid failures.

Facts are a basis for viable action; but acting without factual basis is like living in a dream; facts alone cannot produce action. There must be possibilities otherwise there can be no action. There are logical and theoretical possibilities etc. but in action, the possibilities must be real possibilities i.e. they must be integrated in the factual basis. Speculative possibilities will not do. Real possibilities are factual possibilities in the sense that they are embedded in the factual basis of the actor. Then, if something is factually possible to an actor, then she is able to succeed if she engages in doing it. However, factual possibilities do not make people act. The actor needs values to motivate her, and the values must be within the range of - i.e. integrated with - the factual possibilities. Actions will not succeed, if values lie outside the range of factual possibilities. But if the actor recognizes that her values are within the range of the factual possibilities then she will act and succeed. Finally, since most actions involve other actors, the actor needs to communicate her endeavour with its integration of facts, possibilities and values, to make it become a supported part of the action games in a social setting by coordinating a social division of labour.

=== The Relational Complex ===
The dimensions have a relational structure with the one end anchored in the actor the other in the surrounding world. Any relation relevant to action is directly or indirectly connected to the four dimensions.

Dimension	Actor (Relational component)	World (Relational component)	being in (Relation basis)	Levels of Integration
Factual	Perception	External things, relations	Evidence	Factual possibilities
Possibilities	Reflection, logical analysis	Dispositions, power, resources,	Conceptualization Analysis, Theories, Models	Factual possibilities
Values	Love and liking	Objectivized values	Intention, motivation	Social structure
Communication	Expression-impression	The other: impression-expression	Language games	Understanding, mutual interests

=== The Social Factory ===
From a methodological point of view the dimension of communication is the vehicle of departure for producing social reality. PC emphasizes communication as Language game (philosophy) with which people endeavour to integrate the dimensions while organizing actions in order to succeed. Language games are the basic activity for reality construction and for the development of skills needed in action; the language games therefore constitute a social factory.

=== Topoi and Co-Narration ===
In PC practice, cooperation is a system of language games in which participants contribute to stay in the game, and co-narrate action. Practice is regulated by specific ideas, called topoi. The interactions of each practice are regulated by specific topoi, including professional rules that characterise the activities. The overarching structure of language games in a complex practice is likewise coordinated by overarching topoi regulating various sets of ideas that define the activities.

=== IT language, digitalization and control ===
PC addresses reductivist challenges caused by IT based control systems. Society is increasingly controlled by IT systems based on a formal, non-integrative digital language. IT systems have a great power when in the control of creative users, but also when in control of centralized powers. The IT language systems are digital systems and thus extremely reductivistic and not outlined to express phenomena such as meaning, value, possibilities.

== METHODS ==
PC research is engaged in adapting and improving some of the methodological instruments considered important to valid and reliable insight in the dynamics of social processes. These include theoretical work with analyzing conceptual structures and interventionist and dialogue procedures.

=== Conceptual Structures ===
To enable studies to satisfy demands of validity including relevance and consistency PC outlines models for understanding and working with concepts. The various dimensions are reflected in the structure of the concepts: observational criteria for identification, complementary and other logical relations between concepts to specify the possibilities related to the phenomena and the value idealizations associated with the concepts. Basic concepts constitute a practice ontology depending on the technology of practice, and the various layers of the concepts as they develop to the conceptual habita of practice and research.

=== Interventionist methods ===
Interventionist settings can be considered as a real-life laboratory of different actors and intentions, in which the researcher gets a unique access to practice and observation of phenomena that cannot be observed from a distance. The idea of pragmatic constructivism regarding intentional actors and co-authorship can typically be witnessed in interventionist settings. Due to the ability to access several actors’ interaction in meetings and other occasions, and due to the possibility of collecting extensive documentation in interventionist research, language games can also be addressed and examined with interventionist research

=== Dialogues and Double Loop Hermeneutics ===
To produce productive dialogues PC methods can apply a double loop of interpretation (hermeneutics). In a single loop dialogue, the participants interpret each others statements about their topic while trying to make sense of and integrate what the other means through repeated questioning and explanation. PC advocates using the double loop in the process of understanding: the dialogue not only aims at coordinating knowledge of the topic but to interpret and integrate the special concerns of the actors, which might otherwise disturb the process and the outcome.

=== Diagnostics ===
PC considers problems of modern society as effects of the dominant operating reality constructs: climate, overpopulation and poverty, wars and refugees, even diseases due to immunity of bacteria caused by excess of use of antibiotics. These are all man-made effects of using reductivist approaches in reality construction practices. To overcome the problems, a re-conceptualization which overcomes illusionary constructs is important. Endeavours of re-conceptualization are always ongoing, although complicated and seriously counteracted by the resilient structures. The ease and success of re-conceptualization depends on the reflective culture of language game furnishing the social factory.

== Pragmatic Constructivist Outlets ==
The Actor-Reality Construction network publishes the online journal: Proceedings of Pragmatic Constructivism.

The network further organises annual conferences on PC perspectives on actor-reality construction as well as some workshops on contemporary research topics such as digitalisation, language games and ethics.
