= Commensurability =

Two concepts or things are commensurable if they are measurable or comparable by a common standard.

Commensurability most commonly refers to commensurability (mathematics). It may also refer to:

- Commensurability (astronomy), whether two orbital periods are mathematically commensurate.
- Commensurability (crystal structure), whether periodic material properties repeat over a distance that is mathematically commensurate with the length of the unit cell.
- Commensurability (economics), whether economic value can always be measured by money
- Commensurability (ethics), the commensurability of values in ethics
- Commensurability (group theory), when two groups have a subgroup of finite index in common
- Commensurability (philosophy of science)
- Commensurability (physics), a concept in dimensional analysis that concerns conversion of units of measurement
  - Apples and oranges, common idiom related to incommensurability
