= Thierry Chaput =

French design theorist and curator

Thierry Chaput (12 October 1949 – 28 April 1990) was a design theorist and curator. He realised several major exhibition projects for the Cité des Sciences et de l'Industrie, and for the Centre de Création Industrielle at the Centre Georges Pompidou in Paris, incl. the exhibition Les Immatériaux (1985) which Chaput co-curated with Jean-François Lyotard.

== Biography ==
Thierry Chaput was born on 12 October 1949 in Boulogne-Billancourt, Département Hauts-de-Seine, where he spent his childhood. He lived and worked in Paris where, together with sculptor and architect Katia Lafitte, he had two children, Thomas and Alice. Thierry Chaput died in Paris on 28 April 1990.

== Academic and professional career ==
Thierry Chaput went to the Lycée Buffon in Paris, where he did his baccalauréat in 1967. He studied at ENSAD (École Nationale Supérieure des Arts Décoratifs), Paris, where he received his diploma in Product Design in 1973, and then studied Ergonomics at CNAM (Conservatoire national des arts et métiers, diploma in 1977). In 1989/1990, Chaput was working on a doctorate about "Esthétique des micro-technologies et des systèmes numériques" with Edmond Couchot at Univ. Paris VIII, departement Arts et technologie de l'image.

Thierry Chaput first worked as an intern and trainee journalist at ORTF, department for international broadcasts (1968–1970). Chaput was then commissioned by the Centre de Création Industriel, C.C.I., Centre Georges Pompidou, to develop a system to automate the documentation of products, called SIP (Système d'information sur les produits) (1975–1978).

Project at the Fonderie du Bélier, in Vérac, Gironde (won the award "La meilleure équipe de conception" of ANACT, 1978).

Project management and curator of exhibitions and audiovisual productions at the C.C.I. (1978–1985). (see list of exhibitions, below)

Co-founder of the exhibitions company ORGANON, together with Marc Girard and Martine Moinot in 1985. Other associates of the company included Bernard Stiegler and Philippe Delis.

Engineering consultant in ergonomics for the electrical household appliances company CALOR, Lyon (1979–1985).

Lecturer at ESIEE (Ecole Supérieure d'Ingenieurs en Electronique et Electrotechnique, 1979–1982) and Université Paris VIII (1985–1986).

Programme coordinator at the Cité des Sciences et de l'Industrie, La Villette, Paris (1985–1986), a post on which he was followed by his former colleague from the C.C.I., Marc Girard. Chaput went on to become the general secretary of ACM SIGGRAPH FRANCE (a newly founded French branch of SIGGRAPH, since 1987), scientific and artistic director of the PIXIM 88 exhibition and festival.

Project coordinator "Maison de la communication du Nord-Pas de Calais" (1985–1986, together with Bernard Stiegler), which opened in the city of Béthune as IRCOM (Institut régional de la communication) in 1987 (destroyed by a fire in 1989).

Member of the International Scientific Committee of "Espace SNVB International" (since 1988).

== Exhibitions, publications ==
=== Exhibitions ===
- Sous le soleil autrement, Centre de Création Industriel, C.C.I., Centre Pompidou, 1978.
- La mesure du temps, Centre de Création Industriel, C.C.I., Centre Pompidou, 1979. (realised on the occasion of INOVA 79, supported by the Délégation à l'Innovation et à la Technologie of the Ministre de l'Industrie; see Centre Pompidou, Annual Report 1979.)
- Travail sous conditions, Centre de Création Industriel, C.C.I., Centre Pompidou, 1979.
- Billes en tête. L'imagerie du flipper, Centre de Création Industriel, C.C.I., Centre Pompidou, 1981.
- différences/indifférences? Handicapes et vie quotidienne, Centre de Création Industriel, C.C.I., Centre Pompidou, 1981.
- Langage papier-crayon, Centre de Création Industriel, C.C.I., Centre Pompidou, 1981.
- Les Immatériaux, Centre de Création Industriel, C.C.I., Centre Pompidou, 1985 (preparations started in 1981, Jean-François Lyotard joined the project in 1983).
- L'Homme réparé, Cité des Sciences et de l'Industrie, La Villette, Paris, 1986.
- Image calculée, Cité des Sciences et de l'Industrie, La Villette, Paris, 1988.

=== Publications ===
- Thierry Chaput, André Hatala: "Ecrire (Avec quel stylo ?)". In: Cree [F], no 26, janvier-février 1974, pp. 38–43.
- (contribution) Energie pour la vie, ed. Ronald Alves, Charles Milligan, Paris: Editions du Chêne, 1977/1983.
- (co-author) "Rapport: Culture de communication: éléments de reflexion et propositions de protocoles pour des préfigurations dans les collectivités locales", Collège International de Philosophie, Ministère de la Recherche et de la Technologie, (no date).
- "Micro-esthétique en désordre." In: Cahiers du CCI [F], n 2, 1986, pp. 93–96.
- (contribution) Colloquium Le musée aujourd'hui, with Thierry Chaput, Jean-Pierre Dalbera, Michel Deguy, Bernard Deloche, Jean-Louis Déotte, Serge Renimel, Michel Servière, Bernard Stiegler, organised in cooperation by Collège international de philosophie and Bibliothèque Kandinsky, Centre Pompidou, Paris 16–18 October 1986 (audio-recording at the Bibliothèque Kandinsky)
- "From Socrates to Intel: The Chaos of Microaesthetics", in Design after Modernism, ed. John Thackara, London: Thames & Hudson, 1988.

Various publications in the journals Cree, Autrement, Parachute, Les Cahiers du C.C.I., interviews published by Le Monde, Sciences et Avenir, New York Times, Modo, Falter, France-Inter, France-Culture, Europe No. 1.

== Paraphernalia ==
Thierry Chaput was fond of old cars. He loved to drive and to repair beautiful mechanics. In 1990 he owned two Lancia Zagato, a Sunbeam Alpine, and drove a Rover 2000.

Thierry Chaput did his military service, starting in October 1974, in Wittlich/Germany.
