= The Postmodern Condition =

1979 book by Jean-François Lyotard

- Cover of the French edition
- Author: Jean-François Lyotard
- Original title: La condition postmoderne: rapport sur le savoir
- Translators: Geoffrey Bennington and Brian Massumi
- Language: French
- Subjects: Postmodern culture, technology, epistemology
- Published: 1979 (Les Éditions de Minuit); 1984 (University of Minnesota Press, in English)
- Publication place: France
- Media type: Print

The Postmodern Condition: A Report on Knowledge (French: La condition postmoderne: rapport sur le savoir) is a 1979 book by the philosopher Jean-François Lyotard, in which the author analyzes the notion of knowledge in postmodern society as the end of 'grand narratives' or metanarratives, which he considers a quintessential feature of modernity. Lyotard introduced the term 'postmodernism', which was previously only used by art critics, into philosophy and social sciences, with the following observation: "Simplifying to the extreme, I define postmodern as incredulity towards metanarratives". Originally written as a report on the influence of technology in exact sciences, commissioned by the Conseil des universités du Québec, the book was influential.

== Summary ==
Lyotard criticizes metanarratives such as reductionism and teleological notions of human history such as those of the Enlightenment and Marxism, arguing that they have become untenable because of technological progress in the areas of communication, mass media and computer science. Techniques such as artificial intelligence and machine translation show a shift to linguistic and symbolic production as central elements of the postindustrial economy and the related postmodern culture, which had risen at the end of the 1950s after the reconstruction of western Europe. The result is a plurality of language-games (a term coined by Ludwig Wittgenstein), of different types of argument. At the same time, the goal of truth in science is replaced by "performativity" and efficiency in the service of capital or the state, and science produces paradoxical results such as chaos theory, all of which undermine science's grand narrative. Lyotard professes a preference for this plurality of small narratives that compete with each other, replacing the totalitarianism of grand narratives.

== Reception ==
The Postmodern Condition was influential. However, Lyotard later admitted that he had a "less than limited" knowledge of the science he wrote about, and to compensate for this ignorance, he "made stories up" and referred to a number of books that he had not actually read. In retrospect, he called it "a parody" and "simply the worst of all my books". The poet Frederick Turner writes that, like many post-structuralist works, The Postmodern Condition "has not worn well". However, he sees it as more readable than other post-structuralist works, and credits Lyotard with covering "a good deal of ground in a lively and economical fashion".
