= Georges Van Den Abbeele =

Belgian scholar and writer (born 1953)

- Born: April 12, 1953 (age 73); Antwerp, Belgium
- Occupations: Literary scholar, culture critic, philosopher, and writer
- Awards: Blaise Pascal Medal in the Social Sciences, European Academy of Sciences; Elected Member, European Academy of Sciences

Academic background
- Education: B.A., French; PhD, Romance Studies
- Alma mater: Reed College; Cornell University

Georges Van Den Abbeele is a literary scholar, culture critic, philosopher, and writer. He is professor of Humanities at the University of California, Irvine, with appointments in the departments of English, and European Languages and Studies, with affiliated appointments in Comparative Literature, Classics, and philosophy, as well as the PhD Program in Culture and Theory.

Trained as a scholar of French literature and philosophy, Van Den Abbeele has published over 70 articles on travel narrative, tourism and immigration, contemporary philosophy, critical theory, human geography, and Renaissance literature. He is the author of ten books and edited volumes, including Travel as Metaphor: From Montaigne to Rousseau, Community at Loose Ends (with the Miami Theory Collective), A World of Fables (with Brenda Schildgen), French Civilization and its Discontents (with Tyler Stovall), and Sense and Singularity: Jean-Luc Nancy and the Interruption of Philosophy . Van Den Abbeele is also well-recognized for his translations into English of French philosopher, Jean-François Lyotard.

Van Den Abbeele is a member of the European Academy of Sciences, and is the recipient of its Blaise Pascal medal for his significant contributions to the human and social sciences. He is a former NEH and Mellon Fellow. He is also a Founding Editorial board member of LIT&TOUR: International Journal of Literature and Tourism Research, and an Editorial board member of The Eighteenth Century: Theory and Interpretation, and formerly of Davis Medieval Texts and Studies.

== Education ==
Born in Belgium, Van Den Abbeele immigrated at an early age to Alberta, Canada, and eventually to Denver, Colorado. He studied at Reed College, graduating with a B.A. in 1976. He then enrolled at Cornell University, and earned his PhD in Romance Studies with minors in Comparative Literature and Classics in 1981.

== Career ==
Van Den Abbeele began his academic career as a Tutor and Translator at the Portland School of Languages in 1976, before holding appointment as a Teaching Assistant at Cornell University from 1977 till 1980. In 1981, he began teaching at UC Santa Cruz, first as a visiting Assistant Professor and eventually as an Associate Professor of Literature. In 1986, he joined Miami University as an Associate Professor of French and Italian and subsequently, also as Associate in the Department of English. In 1991, he joined the University of California, Davis, as Associate Professor of French and Italian in 1991, before being promoted to Professor of French and Italian in 1996, and Professor of Humanities in 2005. From 2006 till 2010, he served as a Professor of Literature at the University of California, Santa Cruz. He subsequently taught at Northeastern University as Professor of English and of Literature, Languages and Cultures. Beginning in 2013, he began teaching at the University of California, Irvine, as Professor of Comparative Literature, English, and French, and eventually as Professor of Humanities in 2018.

Alongside his academic appointments, Van Den Abbeele also held several administrative appointments in his career. During his tenure at UC-Davis, he served as a Director of the Humanities Program, Director of the Critical Theory Program, and Director of the Davis Humanities Institute, as well as Chair of the Department of French and Italian, and as Faculty Assistant to the Vice-Chancellor of Research. From 1999 till 2007, he served as a President of the Western Humanities Alliance. He held appointment as Dean of Humanities at the University of California, Santa Cruz from 2006 till 2010, as Founding Dean of the College of Social Sciences and Humanities at Northeastern University from 2010 till 2013, and as Dean of the School of Humanities at the University of California, Irvine from 2013 till 2018 where he also served as P.I. for the UC-wide Humanities Network Initiative from 2015 to 2018.

Van Den Abbeele has held several visiting professorships, including University of California, Berkeley, Harvard University, and the University of Southern California. In 2003, he was Distinguished Visiting Professor of French at Oberlin College.

== Works ==
Van Den Abbeele's fields of study include the literature of travel and tourism, continental philosophy, and European studies, with particular attention to the history of French philosophy from Montaigne through the contemporary era, notably the work of Jean-François Lyotard, Jean-Luc Nancy, Louis Marin, and Jacques Derrida. In addition to work in film and media studies, he has contributed to the expansion of French studies to include a wider range of francophone and postcolonial literatures, and in particular those of Belgium, Canada, the Caribbean, and South East Asia.

Van Den Abbeele authored Travel as Metaphor: From Montaigne to Rousseau in 1992, and focused on detailed readings of Montaigne, Descartes, Montesquieu, and Rousseau, while reexamining the impact of travel in early modern French philosophy. Lisa Neal is of the view that the book "goes beyond a mere illustration of the commonplace of travel as a metaphor for critical thought in order to investigate the extent to which the metaphor of travel might actually limit thought." Van Den Abbeele's book, "French Civilization and Its Discontents: Nationalism, Colonialism, Race," co-authored and co-edited with Tyler Stovall, is described as a work that offers a focused account on "the principal trends of French colonial ideology, contemporary French thoughts and politics, and French studies as an academic filed." According to Madeleine Dobie, the book is a "valuable contribution to the ongoing effort to strongly connect the influential French concepts of civilization, universality, citizenship, nationhood and the history of French colonial expansion." Gary Wilder also praises the book while stating that the broad thematic, geographic and interdisciplinary reach of the work "not only attracts scholars of French colonialism" but also appeals those concerned more generally with colonial legacies and the postcolonial condition.'

More recently, Van Den Abbeele has published a series of papers focused on detailed studies of "precariat", the gig economy, populism, and the challenges of mutual aid. In an interview with Telos Press Podcast, he discussed the history of the welfare state in relation to traditional mutual aid, the concept of the "precariat" and how it compels a rethinking of traditional notions of the working class and of the question of mutual aid. Moreover, he provided his insights regarding possible new forms of mutual aid with the rise of both the gig economy and new forms of social interaction. Later on, he suggested that new forms of mutual aid might be possible on the governmental level through universal basic income.

== Awards and honors ==
- 1975 – Dorothy O. Johansen Honorary Scholarship, Reed College
- 1980 – Dale Corson French Prize
- 1980 – Sage Graduate Fellowship
- 1984 – Andrew W. Mellon Faculty Fellowship, Harvard University
- 1984 – Junior Fellow, Cornell Society for the Humanities (declined)
- 1985 – Fellow, National Humanities Center(declined)
- 1990 – Fellow, Davis Humanities Institute
- 1996 – Faculty Fellow, National Endowment for the Humanities
- 1996 – Resident Fellow, University of California Humanities Research Institute
- 1998 – Research Fellow, Oregon Humanities Center
- 2003 – Distinguished Visiting Professor of French, Oberlin College
- 2008 – Blaise Pascal Medal in the Social Sciences, European Academy of Sciences
- 2008 – Elected Member, European Academy of Sciences

== Publications ==
=== Books ===
- Community at Loose Ends, with the Miami Theory Collective (1991) ISBN 9780816619221
- Travel as Metaphor: From Montaigne to Rousseau (1992) ISBN 9780816619337
- A World of Fables, with Brenda Schildgen (2003) ISBN 9781881896272
- French Civilization and Its Discontents: Nationalism, Colonialism, Race, with Tyler Stovall (2003) ISBN 9780739106471
- Sense and Singularity: Jean-Luc Nancy and the Interruption of Philosophy (2023). ISBN 9781531503307

=== Books translated ===
- Jean-François Lyotard, The Differend: Phrases in Dispute (Minneapolis: University of Minnesota Press, 1988)
- Eric Alliez, Capital Times: Tales from the Conquest of Time I (Minneapolis: University of Minnesota Press, 1996)
- Jean-François Lyotard, Postmodern Fables (Minneapolis: University of Minnesota Press, 1997)
- Jean-François Lyotard, Enthusiasm: The Kantian Critique of History (Stanford: Stanford University Press, 2009)
- Jean-François Lyotard, The Poverty of Philosophy (in progress)

=== Edited volumes ===
- The Work of Jean-François Lyotard, special issue of Diacritics 14:3 (Fall 1984).
- The Discourse of Travel, special issue of L'Esprit Créateur 25:3 (Fall 1985).
- Writing Between the Lines (Censored), special issue of Diacritics 27:2 (Summer 1997).
- Travels and Travelers/Voyages et voyageurs, special issue of Sites 5:1 (Spring 2001), co-edited with Roger Celestin and Eliane Dal Molin.
- Tourism and Tourists in Language and Linguistics, special issue of Textus XXV (2012: no. 1), co-edited with Luisanna Fodde.

=== Selected articles ===
- Van Den Abbeele, G. (1980). Sightseers: The Tourist as Theorist, Diacritics 10, 3–14.
- Van Den Abbeele, G. (1997). The Persecution of Writing: Revisiting Strauss and Censorship, Diacritics 27:3, 3–17.
- Van Den Abbeele, G. (2003). The Children of Belgium, in French Civilization and Its Discontents: Nationalism, Colonialism, Race, ed. with T. Stovall (Lanham, MD: Lexington Books), 323-42.
- Van Den Abbeele, G. (2008). 'Tears at the End of the Road': The Impasse of Travel and the Walls at Angel Island. Writing Travel: The Poetics and Politics of the Modern Journey, 239–260.
- Van Den Abbeele, G. (2014). Monograms: Then and 'Now', in Nancy Now, eds., Verena Conley and Irving Goh (Cambridge, U.K.: Polity Press), 59–89.
- Van Den Abbeele, G. (2017). Literary Intransigence, CounterText 3:3, 316–28.
- Van Den Abbeele, G. (2019). Challenges for a Left Populism: a response to Chantal Mouffe. Global Discourse: An interdisciplinary journal of current affairs, 9(2), 439–443.
- Van Den Abbeele, G. (2022). Can the Precariat Be Organized?: The Gig Economy, Worksite Dispersion, and the Challenge of Mutual Aid. Telos, 2022(198), 67–89.
- Van Den Abbeele, G. (2022). Pathways to the Obscene in Calvin and Calvinism, The Politics of Obscenity in the Age of the Gutenberg Revolution" Obscene Means in Early Modern French and European Print Culture and Literature, edited by Peter Frei and Nelly Labère (London: Routledge), 237-50.
- Van Den Abbeele, G. (2022). Mourning Alone Together, Oxford Literary Review 44:2, 70–82.
- Van Den Abbeele, G. (2022). A Matter of Time: Color, Affect, and the Suffering of Thought, in Lyotard and Critical Practice, edited by Kiff Bamford and Margret Grebowicz (London: Bloomsbury), 51–63.
- Van Den Abbeele, G. (2023). The Iterative Cogito or the Sum of Each and Every Time (Reading Descartes with Nancy)," in Irving Goh, ed., Jean-Luc Nancy Among the Philosophers (New York: Fordham University Press, 2023), 21-51.
