= Bud Goodall =

American academic (1952–2012)

Harold Lloyd "Bud" Goodall Jr. (September 8, 1952 – August 24, 2012) was an American scholar of human communication and a writer of narrative ethnography. He was a professor in the Hugh Downs School of Human Communication at Arizona State University.

== Biography ==
The only child of Harold Lloyd Goodall and Naomi Saylor Goodall, he grew up in Europe (Rome, London) and the United States (West Virginia, Wyoming, Pennsylvania, Maryland).

Goodall's father died on March 12, 1976, when he was 53 and Goodall was 23. At the time, Goodall thought his father was "an ordinary government worker who had retired on full disability from the Veterans Administration". One clue this was a lie was when he drove his father to the VA office in Philadelphia to file health claims and his father had no idea how to do the paperwork. Goodall later wrote a book about his belated discovery, from reading his father's diary after his death, that his father had been an intelligence officer with the Central Intelligence Agency.

He obtained a B.A. in language arts from Shepherd University in 1973; a M.A. in speech communication from the University of North Carolina at Chapel Hill in 1974; and a Ph.D. in speech communication from The Pennsylvania State University in 1980. At Penn State, his dissertation advisers were Gerald M. Phillips and Stanley Weintraub, and his dissertation was a rhetorical biography of F. Scott Fitzgerald and Zelda Fitzgerald.

His first academic appointment was at the University of Alabama in Huntsville (1980–1989), where he was promoted to associate professor in 1984, and appointed founding chair of the Department of Communication Arts. During this time he began working on autoethnography and narrative ethnography. In 1989 he accepted an associate professorship in the Department of Communication at the University of Utah (1989–1991) and published the first book-length autoethnography in the field of communication studies: Casing a Promised Land: The Autobiography of an Organizational Detective as Cultural Ethnographer (Southern Illinois University Press, 1989), and his second autoethnography, Living in the Rock n Roll Mystery: Reading Context, Self, and Others as Clues (Southern Illinois University Press, 1991). At Utah he collaborated with Eric Eisenberg to produce the first critical and cultural textbook in organizational communication, Organizational Communication: Balancing Creativity and Constraint (Bedford/St. Martins, 1993), a book that won the Textbook and Academic Authors Association “Texty” award for the Outstanding Textbook in Education, Communication, Visual, and Performing Arts in 1994. He resigned from Utah in 1991 to accept a full professorship and leadership responsibilities for a newly formed speech and communication studies area at Clemson University (1991–1995). During this period he investigated the illusive concept of “writing the ineffable” in relation to the spiritual quest of individuals and the expressed spirituality of communities, culminating in the completion of his ethnographic trilogy with the publication of Divine Signs: Connecting Spirit to Community (Southern Illinois University Press, 1996). From 1995 until 2004 he served as founding head of the Department of Communication at the University of North Carolina at Greensboro, and throughout this period he continued to explore the relationships among narrative, creative nonfiction, and communication scholarship, most notably in Writing the New Ethnography (AltaMira Press, 2000). In 2003 the National Communication Association gave him the Gerald M. Phillips Award for Distinguished Applied Communication Scholarship. From 2004 until 2009 he served as professor and director of the Hugh Downs School of Human Communication at Arizona State University. In 2006 he won the “Best Book” award from the Ethnography Division of the National Communication Association for his memoir A Need to Know: The Clandestine History of a CIA Family (Left Coast Press, 2006), a book reviewed by Chris Petit in The Guardian, and one the reviewer calls "an important and brilliant take on life in mid-20th century US." Since July 1, 2009 he was a professor of communication at ASU and an active contributor to the Consortium for strategic communication, of which Steve Corman is director.

He served as a co-principal investigator (with Steve Corman, as principal investigator), of a grant from the Office of Naval Research of $2,588,162 (2009–2012) “Identifying Terrorist Narratives and Counter-Narratives: Embedding Story Analysts in Expeditionary Units”

A festschrift honoring his life and work, created and edited by his colleagues Sarah Amira de la Garza, Nick Trujillo, and Robert Krizek, was published by Innovative Inquiry in July 2012. In 2014, Andrew F. Herrmann and Kristen DiFate edited a special issue of Storytelling Self Society reflecting upon the work of Goodall and fellow communication scholar and ethnographer Nick Trujillo.

== Major contributions ==
Goodall was a pioneer in autoethnography and narrative ethnography, following in the footsteps of Thomas Benson at Penn State, who wrote the first published autoethnography in the communication field, "Another Shootout in Cowtown," in 1981, and Michael E. Pacanowski, whose "Slouching Towards Chicago” was the second, published in 1988. Goodall's Casing a Promised Land (1989) was the third contribution in the field and the first book length study that employed autoethnographic methods, in this instance to study high technology cultures in Huntsville, Alabama. Goodall's writing style was greatly influenced by a generation of creative nonfiction/new journalism writers, including Norman Mailer, Gay Talese, Truman Capote, Tom Wolfe, and Joan Didion; by novelists Barry Hannah, Raymond Chandler, Kurt Vonnegut Jr., and Thomas Pynchon; and by the American poet Walt Whitman. Goodall also cites Lee Gutkind’s creative nonfiction definition “the literature of reality” as a key to understanding his style. An article he wrote summarizes the influences on him and describes how the power of narrative works in his writing: H. L. Goodall Jr., “Writing Like a Guy in Textville: A Personal Reflection on Narrative Seduction,” International Review of Qualitative Research, 2, (May 2009), 67–88.

As an academic author who reached a broader public audience, his stories and studies focused on three major themes:

1. Narratives about American cultures: From being an “organizational detective,” to playing rhythm guitar in a rock n roll band, to serving as an active contributor to a political campaign, to studying football as a spiritual practice in the South, to analyzing the communication practices in the ancient art of feng shui, to studying the Ferraristi of Long Island, to a “microethnography” of a "witch shop" in Old Salem, Massachusetts, his writing has explored diverse cultures, individuals, and groups.
2. Narratives about the Cold War and its relationship to the current Global War on Terror: Following the tragic events of 9/11 Goodall began keeping track of what became known as the “Global War on Terror” and its cultural relationship to the Cold War. Since that time he has published numerous accounts of the changes to American culture following 9/11 (e.g., "Fieldnotes from our War Zone") to the culture of secrets and secrecy that pervades both Cold War and the post-9/11 era. Writing on this theme has led Goodall to explore, with Angela Trethewey, the “dark side of leadership,” with Steve Corman and Angela Trethewey how strategic communication can improve counter-terrorism and public diplomacy, as well as the long-term effects of growing up in a family that kept national security secrets.
3. Narratives about narrative, and especially about how to write and think about them: From his earlier book, Writing the New Ethnography (2000) to the more recent Writing Qualitative Inquiry (2008) Goodall provides guides to fieldwork and writing for a new generation of scholars.

In the edited volume Qualitative Inquiry and the Politics of Evidence, Goodall, along with his colleagues Carolyn Ellis, Art Bochner, Laurel Richardson, and Norman K. Denzin, is cited as having had a major influence over a generation of scholars and colleagues. These scholars include Robin Boylorn, Tony E. Adams, Andrew F. Herrmann, Amber Kinser, Robert Krizek, Ron Pelias, Caroline Joan S. Picart, Chris Poulos, Lisa Tillman, Nick Trujillo, and Jillian Tullis.

== Death ==
Goodall was diagnosed with stage IV pancreatic cancer in June 2011. He created a blog about what it is like to live this way to provide readers with a personal narrative on his and his family's end-of-life experiences.

== Selected publications ==
In addition to 35 peer-reviewed journal articles, over 25 book chapters, and numerous reports and other publications, Goodall is the author of 20 academic and popular books, and of textbooks that have gone into many editions.

=== Scholarly books ===
- H. L. Goodall Jr., Counter-Narrative: How Progressive Academics Can Challenge Extremism and Promote Social Justice. Walnut, Creek, CA: Left Coast Press, 2010.
- Steven R. Corman, Angela Trethewey, & H. L. Goodall Jr. (Eds.) Weapons of Mass Persuasion: Strategic Communication to Combat Violent Extremism. New York: Peter Lang, 2008.
- H. L. Goodall Jr., Writing Qualitative Inquiry: Self, Stories, and Academic Life. Walnut Creek, CA: Left Coast Press, 2008.
- H. L. Goodall Jr., A Need to Know: The Clandestine History of a CIA Family. Walnut Creek, CA: Left Coast Press, 2006. “Best Book of 2006-2007” award, Ethnography Division, National Communication Association.
- H. L. Goodall Jr., Writing the New Ethnography. Lanham, MD: AltaMira Press/Rowman & Littlefield, 2000.
- H. L. Goodall Jr., Divine Signs: Connecting Spirit and Community. Carbondale, IL. Southern Illinois University Press, 1996.
- H. L. Goodall Jr., Living in the Rock n Roll Mystery: Reading Context, Self, and Others as Clues. Carbondale, IL.: Southern Illinois University Press, 1991.
- H. L. Goodall Jr., Casing a Promised Land: The Autobiography of an Organizational Detective as Cultural Ethnographer. Carbondale, IL.: Southern Illinois University Press, 1989. Second edition 1994, 2001.

=== Textbooks ===
- H. L. Goodall Jr., and Angela Trethewey, Why Communication Matters. New York: Bedford/St. Martin's, forthcoming (contract issued April, 2008; scheduled for publication 2011).
- Eric M. Eisenberg, H. L. Goodall Jr., and Angela Trethewey, Organizational Communication: Balancing Creativity and Constraint, New York: Bedford/ St. Martin's Press, 1st ed. 1993, 6th ed. 2010. (Translated into Mandarin Chinese, February, 2004.)
- H. L. Goodall Jr., Sandra Goodall, and Jill Scheifelbein, Business and Professional Communication in a Global Workplace, 3rd. ed. Belmont, CA: Thomson Learning/Wadsworth, 2009. (First Edition 2002.)
- Gerald L. Wilson and H. L. Goodall Jr., Interviewing in Context. New York: McGraw-Hill, 1991.
- H. L. Goodall Jr., Small Group Communication in Organizations, Second Edition. Dubuque, IA.: William C. Brown Company, 1990. First edition, 1984.
- Gerald L. Wilson, H. L. Goodall Jr., and Christopher L. Waagen, Organizational Communication: Managing Change in a High Technology Society. New York: Harper & Row, 1986.
- H. L. Goodall Jr. and Christopher L. Waagen, The Persuasive Presentation: A Practical Guide to Professional Communication in Organizations. New York: Harper & Row, 1986.
- H. L. Goodall Jr., Human Communication: Creating Reality. Dubuque, IA.: William C. Brown, 1983.

=== Trade books ===
- H. L. Goodall Jr., Food Talk: A Man's Guide to Cooking and Conversation with Women. Greensboro, NC: Snowgoose Cove Publishing, 1998.
- H. L. Goodall Jr. and Gerald M. Phillips, Making It in Any Organization. Englewood Cliffs, NJ: Prentice-Hall/Spectrum Books, 1985.
- Gerald M. Phillips and H. L. Goodall Jr., Loving & Living: Improve Your Friendships and Marriage. Englewood Cliffs, NJ: Prentice-Hall/Spectrum Books, 1983.

== Selected honors and awards ==
- Celebrating Bud: A Festschrift Honoring the Life and Work of H. L. 'Bud' Goodall Jr., Tempe, AZ: Innovative Inquiry, 2012. (Edited by Sarah Amira de la Garza, Robert Krizek, & Nick Trujillo).
- "2012 Outstanding Professor Award," Hugh Downs School of Human Communication, Communication Graduate Student Association, Arizona State University.
- 2009 Distinguished Award for a Scholarly Edited Book, Applied Communication Division of the National Communication Association, for Weapons of Mass Persuasion: Strategic Communication to Combat Violent Extremism (with Steve Corman and Angela Trethewey).
- Best Book of 2007, Ethnography Division, National Communication Association, for A Need to Know: The Clandestine History of a CIA Family.
- Visiting Fellowship, Wolfson College, Cambridge University, Easter Term, 2004 (unable to fulfill due to acceptance of new position with Arizona State University)
- Gerald M. Phillips Award for Distinguished Applied Communication Scholarship, National Communication Association, 2003
- Grazier Distinguished Lecture in Communication, University of South Florida, April 2003
- Listed in Contemporary Authors, 2001, 2006
- "Texty" for the Outstanding Textbook in Education, Communication, Visual, and Performing Arts, Textbook and Academic Authors Association, 1994 (with Eric M. Eisenberg)
- He was visiting scholar at Rollins College, September 2006, St. Louis University, March 2003, Texas A&M University, October 2000, University of Alaska-Fairbanks, February–March 1999, and Ohio University, April 1998
