= Consortium for Strategic Communication =

Think tank at Arizona State University

The Consortium for Strategic Communication (or CSC) is a think tank at Arizona State University.

== History ==
The Consortium for Strategic Communication is an initiative of the Hugh Downs School of Human Communication at Arizona State University. It was formed in 2005 to apply communication research to combating terrorism, promoting national security, and engaging in public diplomacy worldwide. It is composed of interdisciplinary scholars at ASU and partner institutions who are interested in applying knowledge of human communication to issues of countering ideological support for terrorism (CIST), diplomacy and public diplomacy. The CSC offers undergraduate and graduate class, as well as, public lectures. COMOPS was the official journal of the Consortium for Strategic Communication (CSC) that provided nonpartisan commentary on current issues in terrorism/counter-terrorism, public diplomacy, and security from a human communication perspective. Each journal or blog post outlined a current issue of interest and analyzes the issue using principles from rhetoric, persuasion, organizational, political, and intercultural communication.

== Current research ==
Recently, the Consortium of Strategic Communication received a two-year, renewable grant of $2.5 million from the Office of Naval Research for their project, "Identifying Terrorist Narratives and Counter-Narratives: Embedding Story Analysts in Expeditionary Units."

In 2008, the Consortium of Strategic Communication received a grant from the U. S. Department of Defense to study the relatively new phenomena of self-organizing systems and armies of the future.

== People ==
- Steven Corman (Ph.D., University of Illinois at Urbana–Champaign, 1988) is a professor in the Hugh Downs School of Communication at Arizona State University where he directs the Consortium for Strategic Communication. He is author or co-author of several articles and white papers on counterterrorism, strategic communication and public diplomacy, edits and blogs frequently at COMOPS Journal, and is also co-editor of the book Weapons of Mass Persuasion: Strategic Communication to Combat Violent Extremism (2008, Peter Lang). Since 2001 he has served as an invited participant on numerous national and international workshops and symposia. In 2003–2005 he was a member of the Scientist Panel for the Strategic Operations Working Group at U.S. Special Operations Command. He has recently given invited presentations and briefings for the NATO Center of Excellence for Defense Against Terrorism, USJFCOM/USSOCOM, Asia Pacific Program for Senior National Security Officers, George C. Marshall European Center for Security Studies, Army War College, and the State Department, among others. Corman's other research interests include organizational communication systems, text and conversation analysis, social networks, and computational modeling/simulation.
- Pauline Hope Cheong (Ph.D., University of Southern California) is a communications scholar in new media and culture. She is an associate professor at the Hugh Downs School of Human Communication at Arizona State University. Her research addresses empirical and policy questions of how we build community and social capital amidst an evolving global media landscape, particularly how minority groups access and appropriate media for social change and social cohesion. She has examined new media connections among religious and extremist groups, youths, and medically underserved populations, in North America and Asia. Her research has been published in multiple international and peer-reviewed journals including New Media and Society, Information, Communication and Society, Journal of Computer-Mediated Communication, Journal of Media and Religion, Health communication, Journal of Health Communication, Journal of International and Intercultural Communication and The Information Society. She is currently the Co-Principal Investigator (with Steve Corman, as Principal Investigator), of a grant from the Office of Naval Research of $2,588,162 (2009–2012) “Identifying Terrorist Narratives and Counter-Narratives: Embedding Story Analysts in Expeditionary Units. She is a recipient of various research awards, including the joint visiting Post-Doctoral fellowship award by Social Science Research Council, U.S., and the Economic and Social Research Council, UK and Top Research Paper awards at the annual International Communication Association Conferences.
- H. L. (Bud) Goodall, Jr. (Ph.D., Penn State University, 1980) is professor of communication in the Hugh Downs School of Human Communication at Arizona State University. A pioneer in the field of narrative ethnography, he introduced the detective figure of speech to revise high technology organizations and cultures in Casing a Promised Land (1989). He also toured and played rhythm guitar in the Whitedog band, investigating rock and roll as a social theory of everyday working life in Living in the Rock n Roll Mystery (1991). He also went undercover to discover alternative forms of religion and spirituality in the southern region of the United States in Divine Signs: Connecting Spirit to Community (1996). He coauthored of Organizational Communication: Balancing Creativity and Constraint, 6th ed. (Bedford/St. Martins, 2009), and he authored the highly acclaimed Writing the New Ethnography (AltaMira Press, 2000). His memoir, A Need to Know: The Clandestine History of a CIA Family (Left Coast Press, 2006), won the Best Book of 2007 award from the Ethnography Division of the National Communication Association. In 2003 the National Communication Association gave him the Gerald M. Phillips Award for Distinguished Applied Communication Scholarship. His most recent work is in applying theories of communication and narratives to the challenge of countering ideological support for terrorism. During this time, he has served as a U.S. Department of State International Speaker and has produced an edited volume, with Steve Corman and Angela Trethewey, Weapons of Mass Persuasion: Strategic Communication and the War of Ideas (Peter Lang, 2008). He is currently the Co-Principal Investigator (with Steve Corman, as Principal Investigator), of a grant from the Office of Naval Research of $2,588,162 (2009–2012) “Identifying Terrorist Narratives and Counter-Narratives: Embedding Story Analysts in Expeditionary Units.
- Angela Trethewey (Ph.D., Purdue University) is Director of the Hugh Downs School of Human Communication at Arizona State University, and is a member of the Consortium for Strategic Communication. Her scholarship centers on issues of ideology and power as they impact strategic communication processes. She is currently working on a Department of Defense sponsored project on self-organizing systems and armies of the future. She is co-author of the best-selling book Organizational Communication: Balancing Creativity and Constraint, (6th ed. Bedford/St. Martins, 2009). And is co-editor of Weapons of Mass Persuasion: Strategic Communication and the War of Ideas (Peter Lang, 2008).
- Chris Lundry is an Assistant Research Professor in the Arizona State University Hugh Downs School of Communications Consortium for Strategic Communication, where he is the group's Southeast Asia specialist. He completed his doctorate in Political Science (Comparative Politics) in May 2009. His dissertation focused on nationalism, state cohesion, and separatism in eastern Indonesia, and was supported by Fulbright, Blakemore Freeman, and ASU Dissertation Completion fellowships. He is fluent in Indonesian, and has worked as a United Nations accredited observer in the 1999 East Timor referendum, a Carter Center observer in the 2004 Indonesian presidential election, and with several NGOs in East Timor and the United States. At ASU, he has taught courses through the Program for Southeast Asian Studies and the departments of Political Science, History, Global Studies and Interdisciplinary Studies.

== Media ==
On September 14, 2009, Chairman of the Joint Chiefs of Staff, Admiral Michael Mullen, answered the Consortium's question they posted on YouTube about how scientists can better assist the military.

== Selected publications ==
- Corman, S. R., Trethewey, A., & Goodall, H. L.(Eds.). Weapons of Mass Persuasion: Strategic Communication to Combat Violent Extremism. New York: Peter Lang, 2008.
- Trethewey, A., Corman, S. R., & Goodall, H. L. (2009). "Out of their heads and into their conversations: Countering extremist ideology."
- Lukens-Bull, R. & Woodward, M. (2009). "Israeli nukes versus Palestinian slingshots."
- Corman, S. R. & Dooley, K. J. (2008). "Strategic communication on a rugged landscape: Principles for finding the right message."
- Hess, A. & Justus, Z. S. (2007). "(Re)defining the long war: Toward a new vocabulary of international terrorism."
- Woodward, M. (2007). "Islam, pluralism and democracy."
- Corman, S. R., Trethewey, A., & Goodall, H. L. (2007). "A 21st century model for communication in the global war of ideas."
- Justus, Z. S. & Hess, A. (2006). "One Message for many audiences: Framing the death of Abu Musab al-Zarqawi."
- Goodall, H. L., Trethewey, A., & McDonald, K. (2006). "Strategic ambiguity, communication, and public diplomacy in an uncertain world: Principles and practices."
- Corman, S. R., Hess, A., Justus, Z. S. (2006). "Credibility on the war on terrorism."
