= Commensurability (economics) =

Commensurability in economics arises whenever there is a common measure through which the value of two entities can be compared.

Commensurability has two versions:

- Strong commensurability arises when it is possible to give cardinal values to entities as a consequence of utilising a given property to measure entities. Thus we can say "This is two and a half times more valuable than that." This implies value monism.
- Weak commensurability arises when it is only possible to apply ordinal values to entities as a consequence of utilising a given property to rank entities, i.e., it is sufficient to say "This is more valuable than that." This is consistent with value-pluralism.

While weak commensurability is a form of strong comparability, it is distinct from weak comparability, where the fact that a comparison is valid in one context does not imply that it is so in all contexts. Also issues of comparability are different from indeterminacy: it may not be possible in certain circumstances to make a measurement, even though if such data was available it would be valid to compare measurements.

Commensurability is a key factor in the socialist calculation debate.
