= Ruth Francken =

American painter

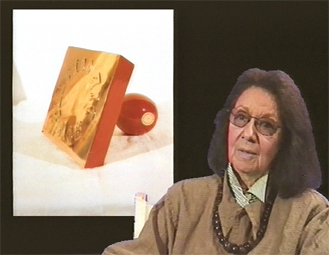
- Ruth Francken discussing her work, 1999
- Born: Ruth Steinreich; 1924; Prague, Czechoslovakia
- Died: 2006 (aged 81–82); Paris, France
- Known for: Sculpture, Painting

Ruth Francken (8 August 1924 – 12 September 2006) was a Czech-American sculptor, painter, and furniture designer who was mostly active in Paris.

== Biography ==
Born Ruth Steinreich in Prague in 1924, Ruth Francken's life and career would span over six decades, two continents, and more than half a dozen countries. After studying painting from 1939-1940 at the Ruskin School in Oxford, England, she moved to New York, where she studied at the Art Students League of New York. After becoming an American citizen in 1942, she worked as a textile designer until 1949, when she left the United States for Europe. After a two-year period in Venice (1950-1952), she moved to Paris, where she lived until her death in 2006, save for two years in the 1960s and 1970s when she worked out of Berlin and Santa Barbara, California.

== Artwork and style ==
Ruth Francken was considered an Abstract Expressionist in her early career, until around 1964. After this point she began working with object sculptures, collage, and different textiles and techniques, and her art took on a more surrealist and pop-art aesthetic. She focuses heavily on problems and disconnects in communication. Her work was featured in an international exhibit, initially created by Tate Modern in London, titled "The World Goes Pop."
