= Discourse, Figure =

1971 book by Jean-François Lyotard

- Cover of the first edition
- Author: Jean-François Lyotard
- Original title: Discours, figure
- Translators: Antony Hudek, Mary Lydon
- Language: French
- Series: Cultural Critique Books
- Subject: Structuralism
- Publisher: Klincksieck, University of Minnesota Press
- Publication date: 1971
- Publication place: France
- English publication date: 2011
- Media type: Print (Hardcover and Paperback)
- Pages: 512 (University of Minnesota Press edition)
- ISBN: 978-0816645657

Discourse, Figure (French: Discours, figure) is a 1971 book by the French philosopher Jean-François Lyotard.
