= Valerio Adami =

Italian painter (born 1935)

Valerio Adami (born 17 March 1935) is an Italian painter. Educated at the Accademia di Brera in Milan, he has since worked in both London and Paris. His art is influenced by Pop Art.

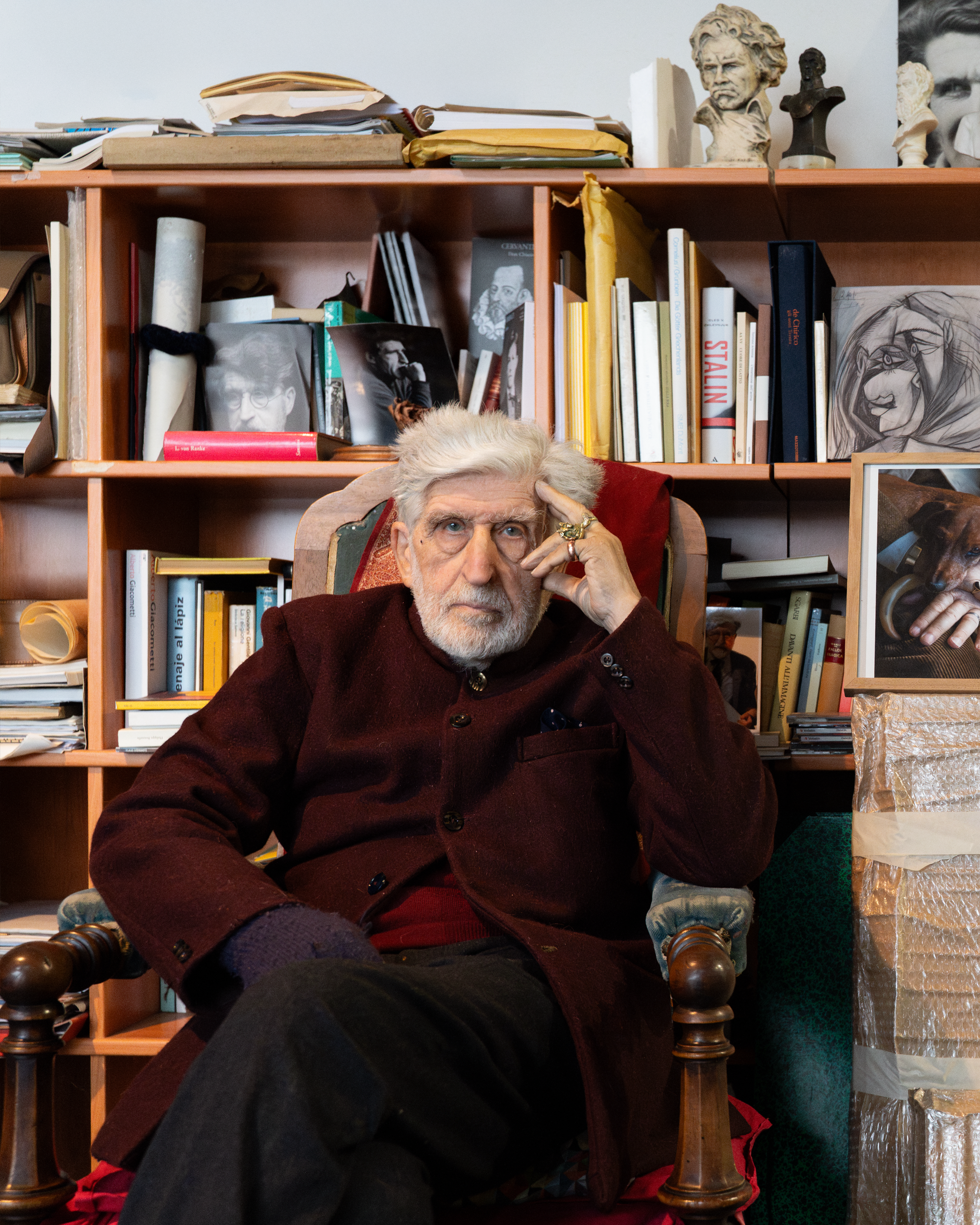
Ritratto di Valerio Adami

== Biography ==
Adami was born in Bologna. In 1945, at the age of ten, he began to study painting under the instruction of Felice Carena. He was accepted into the Brera Academy (Accademia di Brera) in 1951, and there he studied as a draughtsman until 1954 in the studio of Achille Funi. In 1955, he went to Paris, where he met and was influenced by Roberto Matta and Wifredo Lam. His first solo exhibition came in 1959 in Milan.

In his early career, Adami's works were expressionistic, but by the time of his second exhibition in 1964 at Kassel, he had developed a style of painting reminiscent of French cloisonnism, featuring regions of flat color bordered by black lines. Unlike Gauguin, however, Adami's subjects were highly stylised and often presented in fragments, as seen in Telescoping Rooms (1965).

In the 1970s, Adami began to address politics in his art, and incorporated subject matter such as modern European history, literature, philosophy, and mythology. In 1971, he and his brother Gioncarlo created the film Vacances dans le désert. In 1974, he illustrated a Helmut Heissenbuttel poem, Occasional Poem No. 27. Ten Lessons on the Reich with ten original lithographs {Gallerie Maeght}. In 1975, the philosopher Jacques Derrida devoted a long essay, "+R: Into the Bargain", to Adami's work, using an exhibition of Adami's drawings as a pretext to discuss the function of "the letter and the proper name in painting", with reference to "narration, technical reproduction, ideology, the phoneme, the biographeme, and politics".

There were four retrospective exhibits of Adami's work between 1985 and 1998. They were held in Paris, the Centre Julio-Gonzalez de Valence (Spain), Tel Aviv, and Buenos Aires. In 2010, the Boca Raton Museum of Art devoted a special exhibit to Adami's paintings and drawings.
