= Alan D. Schrift =

American philosophy professor

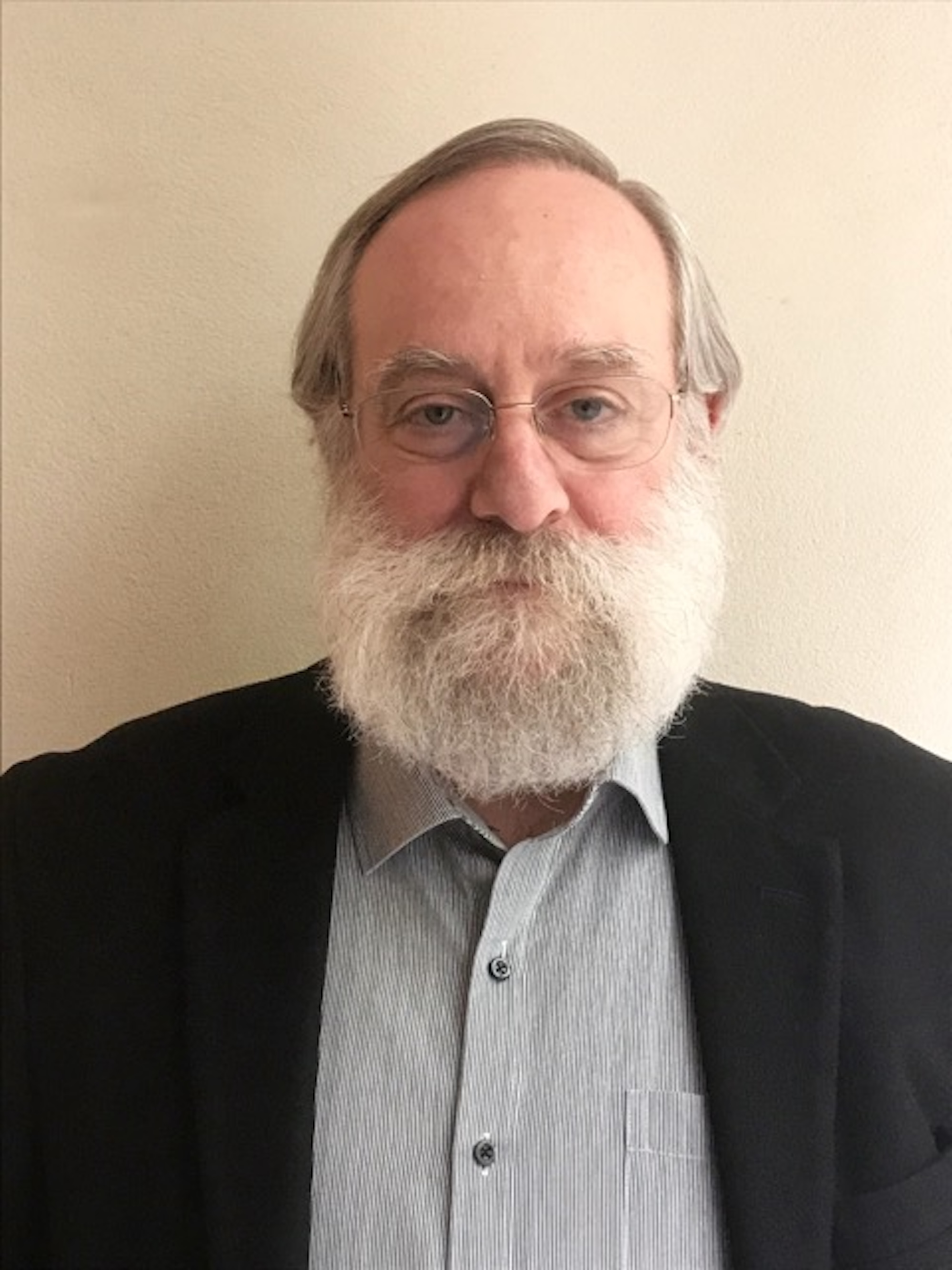
- Born: Alan Douglas Schrift; March 2, 1955 (age 71); New York City, U.S.
- Spouse: Jill Davis Schrift

Education
- Education: Brown University (B.A.); Purdue University (M.A., PhD)
- Thesis: Nietzsche and the Question of Interpretation: Hermeneutics, Deconstruction, Pluralism (1983)
- Doctoral advisor: Calvin O. Schrag

Philosophical work
- Era: Contemporary philosophy
- Region: Western philosophy
- School: Continental philosophy
- Institutions: Clarkson University; Grinnell College

Alan Douglas Schrift (born March 2, 1955) is an American philosopher who is F. Wendell Miller Professor of Philosophy Emeritus at Grinnell College. He specializes in the philosophy and influence of Friedrich Nietzsche as well as nineteenth- and twentieth-century French and German Philosophy, and is the General Editor of The Complete Works of Friedrich Nietzsche at Stanford University Press.

== Education and career ==
Schrift was born in Brooklyn, New York City. He earned his Bachelor of Arts (with honors) from Brown University in 1977, followed by a Master of Arts in 1980 and Doctor of Philosophy in 1983, both from Purdue University. He earned his PhD with a dissertation entitled Nietzsche and the Question of Interpretation: Hermeneutics, Deconstruction, Pluralism.

After two years teaching at Clarkson University in the Center for Liberal Studies, Schrift joined the Department of Philosophy at Grinnell College as Assistant Professor in 1987. Promoted to Associate Professor in 1991, to Full Professor in 1998, and to the Miller Chair in 2006, Schrift served as Department Chair in 1994-2000, 2003-2007, and from 2009 until he retired from teaching in 2013. In addition to teaching a range of courses in 19th- and 20th-century European philosophy, Schrift was the founding and inaugural Director of the Grinnell College Center for the Humanities (1999-2007) and served on several faculty committees, including the Gender and Women’s Studies Concentration Committee (1988-2007).

Beyond Grinnell, Schrift has served the profession in several capacities: as a member of the Executive Committee of the Society for Phenomenology and Existential Philosophy (2014–17); as Executive Co-Director of the Society for Phenomenology and Existential Philosophy (2019-2023); as a member of the Committee for the Status of Women of the Society for Phenomenology and Existential Philosophy (2003-2006); as Chair of the Program Committee of the North American Nietzsche Society (1998-2004); as Editor of the Annual North American Nietzsche Society issue published in the International Studies in Philosophy (1998-2004); and as a member of the Program Committee of the American Philosophical Association Central Division (2003, 2006). He has also served, since 2001, as the lead editor of the Stanford University Press translations of Friedrich Nietzsche’s Kritische Studienausgabe (Berlin: Walter de Gruyter, 1984) as The Complete Works of Friedrich Nietzsche.

== Selected publications ==
- Twentieth-Century French Philosophy: Key Themes and Thinkers. John Wiley & Sons. 2009. ISBN 978-1-4051-4394-3.
- Nietzsche's French Legacy. Routledge. 1995. doi:10.4324/9781315822211. ISBN 978-1-317-82820-4.
- Nietzsche and the Question of Interpretation. 1990. doi:10.4324/9781315831893. ISBN 978-1-315-83189-3.

== Books edited ==
- Jean Wahl, The Idea of the Instant in Descartes’s Philosophy. English translation of Du Role de L’Idée De L’Instant dans la Philosophie de Descartes (Paris: Alcan, 1920). Including English translation of three essays by Frédéric Worms. Edinburgh: Edinburgh University Press, 2026. ISBN 978-1-3995-5955-3,
- Transcendence and the Concrete: Selected Writings of Jean Wahl. New York: Fordham University Press, 2016. Co-edited with Ian Alexander Moore. ISBN 9780823273027.
- The History of Continental Philosophy, 8 volumes (London: Acumen Press/Chicago: University of Chicago Press, 2010). Reviewed as “Essential” by Choice and awarded “Honorable Mention” in the category “Multi-volume Reference Work in the Humanities and Social Sciences” by American Publishers Awards for Scholarly Excellence.
  - Volume 1: Kant, Kantianism, and Idealism: The Origins of Continental Philosophy. Edited by Thomas Nenon.
  - Volume 2: Nineteenth-Century Philosophy: Revolutionary Responses to the Existing Order. Co-edited with Daniel Conway.
  - Volume 3: The New Century: Bergsonism, Phenomenology, and Responses to Modern Science. Co-edited with Keith Ansell-Pearson.
  - Volume 4: Phenomenology: Responses and Developments. Edited by Leonard Lawlor.
  - Volume 5: Critical Theory to Structuralism: Philosophy, Politics and the Human Sciences. Edited by David Ingram.
  - Volume 6: Poststructuralism and Critical Theory’s Second Generation. Edited by Alan D. Schrift.
  - Volume 7: After Poststructuralism: Transitions and Transformations. Edited by Rosi Braidotti.
  - Volume 8: Emerging Trends in Continental Philosophy. Edited by Todd May.
- Modernity and the Problem of Evil. Bloomington: Indiana University Press, 2005. Contributors are Debra B. Bergoffen, Tina Chanter, William E. Connolly, Peter Dews, Martin Beck Matustík, William L. McBride, Robert Meister, Adi Ophir, Robert B. Pippin, Alan D. Schrift, Henry Staten, and Edith Wyschogrod.
- Why Nietzsche Still? Reflections on Drama, Culture, and Politics,. Berkeley: University of California Press, 2000. ISBN 0520218523.
- The Logic of the Gift: Toward an Ethic of Generosity. New York: Routledge, 1997. ISBN 9780415910996
- The Hermeneutic Tradition: From Ast to Ricoeur. Albany: State University of New York Press, 1990. Co-edited with Gayle L. Ormiston.
- T ransforming the Hermeneutic Context: From Nietzsche to Nancy. Albany: State University of New York Press, 1990. Co-edited with Gayle L. Ormiston.
