= The Differend =

1983 book by Jean-François Lyotard

The Differend: Phrases in Dispute
- Cover of the first edition
- Author: Jean-François Lyotard
- Original title: Le Différend
- Translator: Georges Van Den Abbeele
- Language: French
- Subjects: Ethics, aesthetics
- Published: 1983 (Les Éditions de Minuit, in French); 1988 (University of Minnesota Press, in English)
- Publication place: France
- Media type: Print (Hardcover and Paperback)
- Pages: 232 (1988 University of Minnesota Press edition)
- ISBN: 978-0816616114

The Differend: Phrases in Dispute (French: Le Différend) is a 1983 book by the French philosopher Jean-François Lyotard.

== Summary ==
In The Differend, based on Immanuel Kant's views on the separation of Understanding, Judgment, and Reason, Lyotard identifies the moment in which language fails as the differend, and explains it as follows: "...the unstable state and instant of language wherein something which must be able to be put into phrases cannot yet be… the human beings who thought they could use language as an instrument of communication, learn through the feeling of pain which accompanies silence (and of pleasure which accompanies the invention of a new idiom)". Lyotard undermines the common view that the meanings of phrases can be determined by what they refer to (the referent). The meaning of a phrase—an event (something happens)--cannot be fixed by appealing to reality (what actually happened). Lyotard develops this view of language by defining "reality" in an original way, as a complex of possible senses attached to a referent through a name. The correct sense of a phrase cannot be determined by a reference to reality, since the referent itself does not fix sense, and reality itself is defined as the complex of competing senses attached to a referent. Therefore, the phrase event remains indeterminate.

Lyotard uses the example of Auschwitz and the revisionist historian Robert Faurisson’s demands for proof of the Holocaust to show how the differend operates as a double bind. Faurisson argued that "the Nazi genocide of 6 million Jewish people was a hoax and a swindle, rather than a historical fact" and that "he was one of the courageous few willing to expose this wicked conspiracy". Faurisson will only accept proof of the existence of gas chambers from eyewitnesses who were themselves victims of the gas chambers. However, any such eyewitnesses are dead and are not able to testify. Either there were no gas chambers, in which case there would be no eyewitnesses to produce evidence, or there were gas chambers, in which case there would still be no eyewitnesses to produce evidence, because they would be dead. Since Faurisson will accept no evidence for the existence of gas chambers, except the testimony of actual victims, he will conclude from both possibilities (gas chambers existed and gas chambers did not exist) that gas chambers did not exist. This presents a double bind. There are two alternatives, either there were gas chambers or there were not, which lead to the same conclusion: there were no gas chambers (and no final solution). The case is a differend because the harm done to the victims cannot be presented in the standard of judgment upheld by Faurisson.

== Reception ==
The Differend is considered, including by Lyotard himself, to be Lyotard's most important work. It has been seen as providing the theoretical basis for much of his later work.

== Translations ==
- Lyotard, Jean-François (1988). The Differend: Phrases in Dispute. Minneapolis: University of Minnesota Press. ISBN 978-0-8166-1611-4.

== See also ==
- Paul de Man
