= Language game (philosophy) =

Words and contextual actions which provide a complete meaning

A language-game (German: Sprachspiel) is a philosophical concept developed by Ludwig Wittgenstein, referring to simple examples of language use and the actions into which the language is woven. Wittgenstein argued that a word or even a sentence has meaning only as a result of the "rule" of the "game" being played. Depending on the context, for example, the utterance "Water!" could be an order, the answer to a question, or some other form of communication.

== Philosophical Investigations ==
In his work Philosophical Investigations (1953), Ludwig Wittgenstein regularly referred to the concept of language-games. Wittgenstein rejected the idea that language is somehow separate from and corresponding to reality, and he argued that concepts do not need clarity for meaning. Wittgenstein used the term "language-game" to designate forms of language simpler than the entirety of a language itself, "consisting of language and the actions into which it is woven" and connected by family resemblance (Familienähnlichkeit). The concept was intended "to bring into prominence the fact that the speaking of language is part of an activity, or a form of life," which gives language its meaning.

Wittgenstein develops this discussion of games into the key notion of a language-game. He introduces the term using simple examples, but intends it to be used for the many ways in which we use language. In one language-game, a word might be used to stand for (or refer to) an object, but in another the same word might be used for giving orders, or for asking questions, and so on. The famous example is the meaning of the word "game". We speak of various kinds of games: board games, betting games, sports, "war games". These are all different uses of the word "games". Wittgenstein also gives the example of "Water!", which can be used as an exclamation, an order, a request, or an answer to a question. The meaning of the word depends on the language-game within which it is being used. Another way Wittgenstein puts the point is that the word "water" has no meaning apart from its use within a language-game. One might use the word as an order to have someone else bring you a glass of water. But it can also be used to warn someone that the water has been poisoned.

Wittgenstein does not limit the application of his concept of language games to word-meaning. He also applies it to sentence-meaning. For example, the sentence "Moses did not exist" can mean various things. Wittgenstein argues that, independently of use in a particular context, the sentence does not 'say' anything. It is 'meaningless' because it is not used for a particular purpose. The sentence is meaningful only when it is used to say something. For instance, it can be used to say that no person fits the set of descriptions attributed to the person that goes by the name of "Moses". But it can also mean that the leader of the Israelites was not called Moses. Or that no one accomplished all that the Bible relates of Moses, etc. What the sentence means thus depends on the context in which it is used.

The term 'language-game' is used to refer to:

- Fictional examples of language use that are simpler than our own everyday language.
- Simple uses of language with which children are first taught language (training in language).
- Specific regions of our language with their own grammars and relations to other language-games.
- All of a natural language seen as comprising a family of language-games.

These meanings are not separated from each other by sharp boundaries, but blend into one another (as suggested by the idea of family resemblance). The concept is based on the following analogy: The rules of language are analogous to the rules of games; thus saying something in a language is analogous to making a move in a game. The analogy between a language and a game demonstrates that words have meaning depending on the uses made of them in the various and multiform activities of human life. (The concept is not meant to suggest that there is anything trivial about language, or that language is "just a game".)

== Examples ==
The classic example of a language-game is the so-called "builder's language" introduced in §2 of the Philosophical Investigations:

The language is meant to serve for communication between a builder A and an assistant B. A is building with building-stones: there are blocks, pillars, slabs and beams. B has to pass the stones, in the order in which A needs them. For this purpose they use a language consisting of the words "block", "pillar" "slab", "beam". A calls them out; — B brings the stone which he has learnt to bring at such-and-such a call. Conceive this as a complete primitive language.

Later "this" and "there" are added (with functions analogous to the function these words have in natural language), and "a, b, c, d" as numerals. An example of its use: builder A says "d — slab — there" and points, and builder B counts four slabs, "a, b, c, d..." and moves them to the place pointed to by A. The builder's language is an activity into which is woven something we would recognize as language, but in a simpler form. This language-game resembles the simple forms of language taught to children, and Wittgenstein asks that we conceive of it as "a complete primitive language" for a tribe of builders.

== See also ==
- Semiotics – Study of signs
- Worldview, also known as Weltanschauung – Fundamental cognitive orientation of an individual or society
- Speech act – Utterance that serves a performative function
- Neopragmatism – Philosophical position that sees language as a problem-solving tool

== Sources ==
- Jago, Mark (2007). Wittgenstein. Humanities-Ebooks.
- Wittgenstein, Ludwig (1953). Philosophical Investigations. Blackwell.
- Wittgenstein, Ludwig (1942). Blue and Brown Books. Harper Perennial.
