= Gilbert Simondon =

20th-century French philosopher

- Born: 2 October 1924; Saint-Étienne, France
- Died: 7 February 1989 (aged 64); Palaiseau, France

Education
- Education: École Normale Supérieure (Licence de Philosophie, 1948; Licence de Psychologie, 1950); University of Paris (PhD, 1958)
- Theses: L'Individuation à la lumière des notions de forme et d'information (Individuation in Light of Notions of Form and Information) (1958); Du mode d'existence des objets techniques (On the Mode of Existence of Technical Objects) (1958)
- Doctoral advisors: Georges Canguilhem; Jean Hyppolite

Philosophical work
- Era: 20th-century philosophy
- Region: Western philosophy
- School: Continental philosophy French historical epistemology Phenomenology
- Institutions: University of Poitiers; University of Lyon; University of Paris; Paris V
- Main interests: Philosophy of technology, philosophy of nature, philosophy of science, epistemology
- Notable ideas: Individuation through transduction

Gilbert Simondon (French: [simɔ̃dɔ̃]; 2 October 1924 – 7 February 1989) was a French philosopher best known for his theory of individuation and his work on the field of philosophy of technology.

Simondon's work is characterized by his philosophical approach on information theory, communication studies, technology and the natural sciences. Although largely overlooked in his lifetime, the advent of the Information Age has resulted in a reappraisal and increased interest in Simondon's books. He is now seen as someone who precisely predicted and described the social effects and paradigms technical objects and technology itself have offered in the 21st century.

Despite Simondon's thought having remained largely alienated amidst the effervescent wave of post-structuralism of his age in his homeland of France and Europe in general, a few colleagues have been pioneers in praising Simondon's writings and demonstrating the influence and weight of his intellectual work in their own, the most notable being Gilles Deleuze, whose The Logic of Sense is heavily influenced by Simondon's theory of individuation, and Herbert Marcuse, who takes inspiration from Simondon's notions of the effects of technological alienation in society in his book One-Dimensional Man. More recently, Simondon's work influence can most clearly be seen in the works of Bruno Latour, Bernard Stiegler and Yuk Hui.

== Career ==
Born in Saint-Étienne, Simondon was a student of philosopher of science Georges Canguilhem, philosopher Martial Guéroult, and phenomenologist Maurice Merleau-Ponty. He studied at the École Normale Supérieure and the University of Paris. He defended his doctoral dissertations in 1958 at the University of Paris. His main thesis, L'individuation à la lumière des notions de Forme et d'Information (Individuation in the light of the notions of Form and Information), was published in two parts, the first in 1964 under the title L'individu et sa génèse physico-biologique (Individuation and its physical-biological genesis) at the Presses Universitaires de France, although the second part, L'individuation psychique et collective (Psychic and collective individuation) was only published by Aubier in 1989. While his main thesis, which laid the foundations of his thinking, was not widely read until it was commented upon by Bruno Latour and Bernard Stiegler, his complementary thesis, Du mode d'existence des objets techniques (On the mode of existence of technical objects) was published by Aubier immediately after being completed (in 1958) and had an instant impact on a wide audience. It was only in 2005 that Jérôme Millon published a complete edition of the main thesis.

== Thought ==
In L'individuation psychique et collective, Simondon developed a theory of individual and collective individuation, in which the individual subject is considered as an effect of individuation, rather than as a cause. Thus the individual atom is replaced by the never-ending process of individuation. Simondon also conceived of "pre-individual fields" as the resources making individuation itself possible. Individuation is an always incomplete process, always leaving a "pre-individual" left-over, itself making possible future individuations. Furthermore, psychic individuation always creates both an individual and a collective subject, which individuate themselves together. Simondon criticized Norbert Wiener's theory of cybernetics, arguing that "Right from the start, Cybernetics has accepted what all theory of technology must refuse: a classification of technological objects conducted by means of established criteria and following genera and species." Simondon aimed to overcome the shortcomings of cybernetics by developing a "general phenomenology" of machines.

== Influence ==
Simondon's theory of individuation through transduction in a metastable environment was an important influence on the thought of Gilles Deleuze, whose Différence et répétition (1968), Logique du sens (1969) and L'île déserte (2002) make explicit reference to Simondon's work. Gilbert Simondon: une pensée de l'individuation et de la technique (1994), the proceedings of the first conference devoted to Simondon's work, further charts his influence on thinkers such as François Laruelle, Gilles Châtelet, Anne Fagot-Largeault, Yves Deforge, René Thom, and Bernard Stiegler (the latter having placed Simondon's theory of individuation at the very heart of his multi-volume philosophical project).

Another contributor to Gilbert Simondon: une pensée de l'individuation et de la technique, Simondon's friend John Hart, was the instigator of the very first translation—from French into English in 1980—of Simondon's work (at University of Western Ontario in Canada where Hart had founded both a Department of Computer Science and a Simondon-inspired network: the ATN, or Audio Tactile Network in 1964).

Jean-Hugues Barthélémy edited the Cahiers Simondon from 2009 to 2015 with a total of six issues. Currently, Simondon can be seen as a major influence on the work of scholars such as Paolo Virno, Jean-Hugues Barthélémy, Thierry Bardini, Luciana Parisi, Brian Massumi, Adrian Mackenzie, Muriel Combes, Carl Mitcham, Andrew Feenberg, Yuk Hui, Isabelle Stengers, Thomas Lamarre, Bruno Latour and Anne Sauvagnargues.

== Bibliography ==
- Du mode d'existence des objets techniques (Méot, 1958; second ed. Paris: Aubier, 1989).
- L'individu et sa genèse physico-biologique (l'individuation à la lumière des notions de forme et d'information) (Paris: PUF, 1964; second ed. J.Millon, coll. Krisis, 1995).
- L'individuation psychique et collective (Paris, Aubier, 1989; reprinted in 2007 with a preface by Bernard Stiegler).

Posthumous publications

- L’Invention dans les techniques, Cours et conferences (Éd. du Seuil, coll. "Traces écrites").
- L’Individuation à la lumière des notions de forme et d’information (Jérôme Millon, coll. Krisis, 2005).
- Cours sur la perception (1964–1965), Préface de Renaud Barbaras (Editions de La Transparence).
- Imagination et invention (1965–1966) (Editions de La Transparence, 2008).
- Communication et Information. Cours et Conférences (Éditions de La Transparence, 2010).
- Sur la technique (P.U.F., 2014).
- Sur la psychologie (P.U.F., 2015).
- Sur la philosophie (P.U.F., 2016).
- La résolution des problèmes (P.U.F., 2018).

English translations

- "Technical Mentality," trans. Arne De Boever, Parrhesia 07 (2009): 7–27.
- "Techno Aesthetics," trans. Arne De Boever, Parrhesia 14 (2012): 1–8 .
- "Technical Individualization," in Joke Brouwer & Arjen Mulder (eds.), Interact or Die! (Rotterdam: NAi, 2007).
- "The Essence of Technicity," trans. Ninian Mellamphy, Dan Mellamphy & Nandita Biswas Mellamphy, Deleuze Studies 5 (11.11.2011): 406–424,[2].
- "The Genesis of the Individual," in Jonathan Crary & Sanford Kwinter (eds.), Incorporations (New York: Zone Books, 1992): 297–319.
- "The Position of the Problem of Ontogenesis," trans. Gregory Flanders, Parrhesia 07 (2009): 4–16..
- "The Limits of Human Progress," trans Sean Cubitt, Cultural Politics, 8(2) (2010): 229–36.Cultural Politics, 8(2) (2010): 229–36
- Two Lessons on Animal and Man (Minneapolis: Univocal Publishing, 2012) .
- On the Mode of Existence of Technical Objects (Minneapolis: Univocal Publishing, 2016) .
- Individuation in Light of Notions of Form and Information (Minneapolis: University of Minnesota Press, 2020)
