= Minority (philosophy) =

Concept in philosophy

Minority (French: minorité) is a philosophical concept developed by Gilles Deleuze and Félix Guattari in their books Kafka: Towards a Minor Literature (1975), A Thousand Plateaus (1980), and elsewhere. In these texts, they criticize the concept of "majority". For Deleuze and Guattari, "becoming-minor(itarian)" is primarily an ethical action, one of the becomings one is affected by when avoiding "becoming-fascist". They argued further that the concept of a "people", when invoked by subordinate groups or those aligned with them, always refers to a minority, whatever its numerical power might be.

For Deleuze and Guattari the "minor" and "becoming-minority" does not refer to minority groups as described in ordinary language. Minority groups are defined by identities and are thus molar configurations belonging to the majoritarian State machine. (Molar configurations are composed of infinite lines of particles, i.e. lines of becoming.) Deleuze and Guattari's central example here is Franz Kafka. Kafka finds himself at home among neither the Prague Jews nor the dominant German and Austria-Hungarian power structure. For him a "people is missing" and his literature sets out to summon that people. Nonetheless, there is a connection between what are ordinarily referred to as "minorities" and Deleuze and Guattari's conception of the minor and becoming-minor. If becoming-minor often occurs in the context of what are ordinarily called minority groups, then this is because, Deleuze and Guattari argue, becoming-minor is catalyzed by existence in cramped social spaces. The key point not to be missed is that becoming-minor is not related to molar identities, nor is it a politics that seeks representation or recognition of such identities (though Deleuze and Guattari stress that these are worthwhile political ambitions).

The example of patriarchy provides an illustration of how the concept of "minority" is used: while there may be more women than men numerically, in Deleuze and Guattari's terms, which are sensitive to relations of power, men still constitute the majority whereas women form a minority. Thus the concept of "becoming-minor" converges with that of "becoming-woman" (as they say, "everyone has to 'become-woman', even women..."), "becoming-animal", "becoming-molecular", "becoming-imperceptible" and ultimately, "becoming-revolutionary". Each type of affective becoming marks a new phase of a larger process that Deleuze and Guattari call deterritorialization.

François Laruelle further develops this concept in the nascent years of his non-philosophical oeuvre. His concept is distinguished from that of Deleuze and Guattari in that minorities are treated from the point of view (so to speak) of minorities and not via an ensemble of (ultimately) reversible becomings that ends up subordinating the minorities to the Authorities in general (the State, History, Sexuality, ...). Ultimately, in Laruelle's work, the minorities determine the Authorities unilaterally without being determined by them in turn and, as such, escape from the philosophical and socio-logical significations of the term. In Le Principe de minorité (1981), he develops the Minority Principle as Unilaterality and then deepens this work in A Biography of Ordinary Man: On Authorities and Minorities (1985; trans. 2018 by Jessie Hock & Alex Dubilet).

== See also ==
- Affect (philosophy)
- Other
- Racism

== Sources ==
- Deleuze, Gilles. 1979. "One Manifesto Less." Trans. Alan Orenstein. The Deleuze Reader. Ed. Constantin V. Boundas. New York: Columbia UP, 1993. 204–222. ISBN 0-231-07269-4. Also appears in Mimesis, Masochism, and Mime: The Politics of Theatricality in Contemporary French Thought. Ed. Timothy Murray. Trans. Eliane dal Molin and Timothy Murray. Theater: Theory/Text/Performance Ser. Ann Arbor: U of Michigan P, 1997. 239–258. ISBN 0-472-06635-8. Trans. from Superpositions. By Gilles Deleuze and Carmelo Bene. Paris: Les Editions de Minuit.
- Deleuze, Gilles and Félix Guattari. 1972. Anti-Œdipus. Trans. Robert Hurley, Mark Seem and Helen R. Lane. London and New York: Continuum, 2004. Vol. 1 of Capitalism and Schizophrenia. 2 vols. 1972–1980. Trans. of L'Anti-Oedipe. Paris: Les Editions de Minuit. ISBN 0-8264-7695-3.
- ---. 1975. Kafka: Toward a Minor Literature. Trans. Dana Polan. Theory and History of Literature 30. Minneapolis and London: U of Minnesota P, 1986. Trans. of Kafka: Pour une littérature mineure. Paris: Les Editions de Minuit. ISBN 0-8166-1515-2.
- ---. 1980. A Thousand Plateaus. Trans. Brian Massumi. London and New York: Continuum, 2004. Vol. 2 of Capitalism and Schizophrenia. 2 vols. 1972–1980. Trans. of Mille Plateaux. Paris: Les Editions de Minuit. ISBN 0-8264-7694-5.
- Guattari, Félix. 1984. Molecular Revolution: Psychiatry and Politics. Trans. Rosemary Sheed. Harmondsworth: Penguin. ISBN 0-14-055160-3.
- ---. 1995. Chaosophy. Ed. Sylvère Lotringer. Semiotext(e) Foreign Agents Ser. New York: Semiotext(e). ISBN 1-57027-019-8.
- ---. 1996. Soft Subversions. Ed. Sylvère Lotringer. Trans. David L. Sweet and Chet Wiener. Semiotext(e) Foreign Agents Ser. New York: Semiotext(e). ISBN 1-57027-030-9.
- Laurie, Timothy & Khan, Rimi 2017, 'The Concept of Minority for the Study of Culture', Continuum: Journal of Media & Cultural Studies, vol. 31, no. 1, pp. 1–12.
- Massumi, Brian. 1992. A User's Guide to Capitalism and Schizophrenia: Deviations from Deleuze and Guattari. Swerve editions. Cambridge, USA and London: MIT. ISBN 0-262-63143-1.
- Paul Patton, "Deleuze and Democracy", Contemporary Political Theory (2000) 4:4
