= Expressionism in Philosophy: Spinoza =

- Cover of the first edition
- Author: Gilles Deleuze
- Original title: Spinoza et le problème de l'expression
- Translator: Martin Joughin
- Language: French
- Subject: Baruch Spinoza
- Publisher: Editions de Minuit, Zone Books
- Publication date: 1968
- Publication place: France
- English publication date: 1990
- Media type: Print (Hardcover and Paperback)
- Pages: 448 (Zone Books edition)
- Preceded by: Différence et répétition (1968)
- Followed by: Logique du sens (1969)

Expressionism in Philosophy: Spinoza (French: Spinoza et le problème de l'expression) is a 1968 book by the philosopher Gilles Deleuze, in which the author conceives Baruch Spinoza as a solitary thinker who envisioned philosophy as an enterprise of liberation and radical demystification. Deleuze sees how the univocity of Being fits into the theory of substance and looks into the relationship between the theory of ideas and the production of truth and sense, the organisation of affect (elimination of sad passions) to achieve joy, and the organization of affect in the theory of modes.

== Publication history ==
Expressionism in Philosophy: Spinoza was first published by Les Éditions de Minuit in 1968. In 1990, Zone Books published Martin Joughin's English translation.

== Reception ==
The philosopher Alan D. Schrift wrote in The Cambridge Dictionary of Philosophy (2015) that, together with Deleuze's Spinoza: Practical Philosophy (1970), Expressionism in Philosophy: Spinoza "influenced several generations of French Spinozism".
