= Francis Bacon: The Logic of Sensation =

1981 book by Gilles Deleuze

- Cover of the first edition
- Author: Gilles Deleuze
- Original title: Francis Bacon: Logique de la sensation
- Translator: Daniel W. Smith
- Language: French
- Subject: Francis Bacon
- Published: 1981 (Editions de la Difference, in French); 2003 (Continuum, in English)
- Publication place: France
- Media type: Print
- Pages: 209 pages (Continuum edition, 2003)
- ISBN: 978-0816643424

Francis Bacon: The Logic of Sensation (French: Francis Bacon: Logique de la sensation) is a 1981 book by philosopher Gilles Deleuze, analyzing the work of twentieth-century British figurative painter Francis Bacon. In this biography, Deleuze discusses aesthetics, objects of perception ('percepts'), and sensation.

While The Logic of Sensation is sometimes viewed as a work of art history, Deleuze's wrote that the primary motivation for creating the work was to explore the philosophy of art. He also sought to explore the conceptualization of art beyond the representation of an image. The text was translated into English by Daniel W. Smith in 2003.

== Summary ==
Deleuze states that Francis Bacon's art, with its bodies as figures, and spaces as "round areas," exists in the zone of indiscernibility, a parallel to the plane of immanence that artistically follows lines of flight in "the act of fleeing or eluding." However, the book is intended to be built on a slow intensification of its titular viewpoint, "a general logic of sensation," which progresses gradually in complexity. The foundations for Deleuze's interpretation of Bacon's art include the notion of becoming, the problems of the body its structuring (what he calls in this work its flesh and bones, respectively), and the questions of figuration as representation and signification.

Deleuze's concept of art goes beyond the representation of an image. According to Ronald Bogue in "Gilles Deleuze: The Aesthetics of Force", Deleuze emphasizes a common problem across various art forms. He focuses not on reproducing or inventing different forms of representation in art, but on "harnessing forces."

Deleuze explores a comprehensive logic of sensation in response to Bacon's provocative use of smearing, detachment, and the destruction of signifiers about bodies, contemporary myths, and portraiture. Here, Deleuze remarks in the final preface of Francis Bacon that Bacon's art is "of a very special violence." In saying this, he analyses the content of Bacon's paintings set on fields of color with little visual depth that make "use of spectacles of horror, crucifixions, prostheses and mutilations, monsters."

Deleuze attempts to understand the wider literary and semiotic context of Bacon's art through employing the rhizomatic, or nonlinear mode of analysis, which he and psychoanalyst Félix Guattari had popularized in their work A Thousand Plateaus published the previous year. This form of analysis seeks to disentangle the socio-cultural roots of a given subject, through the use of a dialectical comparison. For Bacon's art, Deleuze makes prominent use of Samuel Beckett's novella "The Lost Ones" (1966–1970) as one of his main literary examples.
