= Rhizome (philosophy) =

Philosophical model of the connections present in an assemblage

A rhizome is a concept in post-structuralism describing an assemblage that allows connections between any of its constituent elements, regardless of any predefined ordering, structure, or entry point. It is a central concept in the work of French theorists Deleuze and Guattari.

Gilles Deleuze and Felix Guattari use the term "rhizome" frequently in the development of their theories on schizoanalysis (now generally referred to as rhizomatics, ecosophy, pragmatics, micropolitics, or nomadology). They first expounded on the topic in their book Anti-Oedipus (1972), and continued in their follow-up work, A Thousand Plateaus (1980). This was later developed into a set of pedagogical theories on rhizomatic learning.

Deleuze and Guattari borrow from nature and use the terms "rhizome" and "rhizomatic" (from Ancient Greek ῥίζωμα (rhízōma) 'mass of roots') to describe a network that "connects any point to any other point".

The term "rhizome" is first introduced in this context in Deleuze and Guattari's 1975 book Kafka: Toward a Minor Literature, to suggest that Kafka's work is not bound by linear narrative structure, and can be entered into at any point to map out connections with other points.

The term "rhizome" is later heavily expanded upon, in Deleuze and Guattari's 1980 work A Thousand Plateaus, where it is used to refer to networks that establish "connections between semiotic chains, organizations of power, and circumstances relative to the arts, sciences and social struggles."

== Opposition to arborescence ==
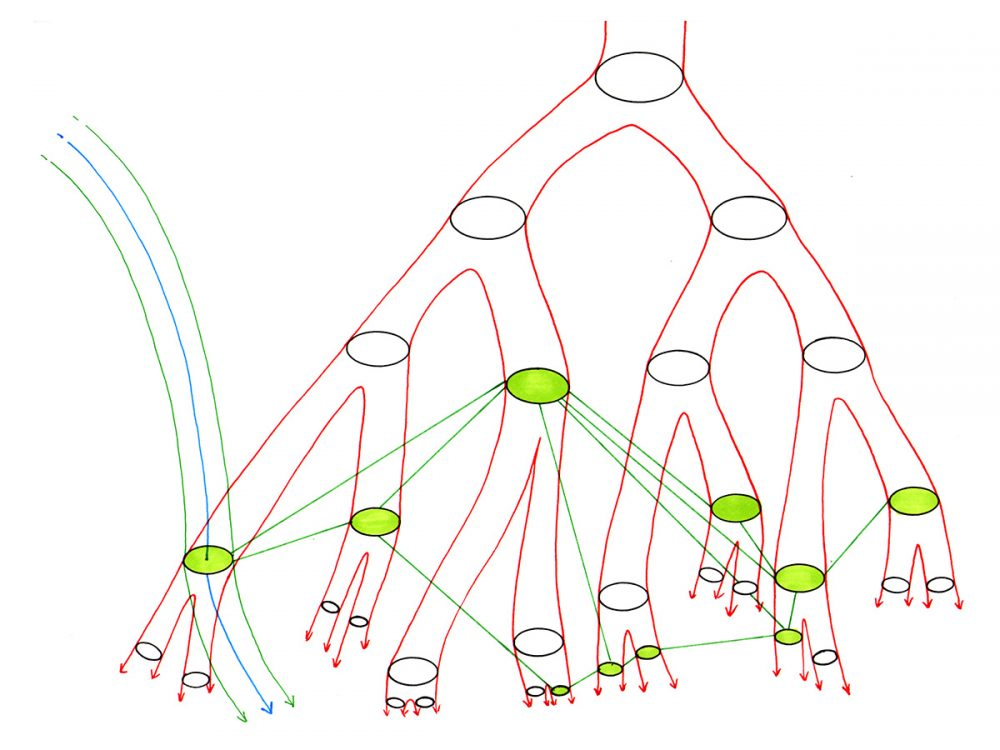
An illustration of rhizome in opposition to arborescence from a 2006 exhibition of works inspired by A Thousand Plateaus at the Doris McCarthy Gallery. The red structure in the image is a tree, which presupposes a linear ordering over its elements that emanates from the root. The green structure in the image is a rhizome, which ceaselessly establishes connections across branches in the tree, without regard for the predefined order.

Arborescent (French: arborescent) refers to the shape and structure of a tree.

A Thousand Plateaus introduces the concept of philosophical rhizome through a botanical metaphor, which contrasts the rhizomatic character of underground root systems to the naturally hierarchical ordering present in tree-structures. "The tree is filiation, but the rhizome is alliance [...]. The tree imposes the verb 'to be,' but the fabric of the rhizome is the conjunction, 'and... and... and...'"

Deleuze and Guattari extend the metaphor beyond botanical trees to the realms of graph theory and linguistic trees.

== Approximate characteristics ==
In A Thousand Plateaus, Deleuze and Guattari write that "The rhizome itself assumes very diverse forms... but we get the feeling that we will convince no one unless we enumerate certain approximate characteristics." These approximate characteristics are:

- "1 and 2. Principles of connection and heterogeneity: any point of a rhizome can be connected to anything other, and must be. This is very different from the tree or root, which plots a point, fixes an order"
- "3. Principle of multiplicity: it is only when the multiple is effectively treated as a substantive, "multiplicity," that it ceases to have any relation to the One as subject or object"
- "4. Principle of asignifying rupture: against the oversignifying breaks separating structures or cutting across a single structure. A rhizome may be broken, shattered at a given spot, but it will start up again on one of its old lines, or on new lines"
- "5 and 6. Principle of cartography and decalcomania: a rhizome is not amenable to any structural or generative model. It is a stranger to any idea of genetic axis or deep structure."

== See also ==
- Contextualism
- Bricolage
- Deleuze and Guattari
- Heterarchy
- Minority (philosophy)
- Multiplicity (philosophy)
- Mutualism
- Perspectivism
- Plane of immanence
- Graph (abstract data type)
  - Arborescence (graph theory)
  - Tree (graph theory)
- Digital infinity
- Intertwingularity
