= Difference and Repetition =

1968 book by Gilles Deleuze

- Cover of the first edition
- Author: Gilles Deleuze
- Original title: Différence et répétition
- Translator: Paul R. Patton
- Language: French
- Series: Bibliothèque de philosophie contemporaine
- Subjects: Difference; Representation
- Publisher: Presses Universitaires de France, Columbia University Press
- Publication date: 1968
- Publication place: France
- English publication date: 1994
- Media type: Print (hardcover and paperback)
- Pages: 350 (Columbia University Press edition)
- ISBN: 0-231-08159-6 (Columbia University Press edition)
- OCLC: 29315323
- Dewey Decimal: 194 22
- LC Class: B2430.D453 D4513 1994b

Difference and Repetition (French: Différence et répétition) is a book by French philosopher Gilles Deleuze. Originally published in France by Presses Universitaires de France in 1968, it was translated into English by Paul Patton in 1994.

Difference and Repetition was Deleuze's principal thesis for his doctoral degree, advised by Maurice de Gandillac. He also wrote a secondary historical thesis, Expressionism in Philosophy: Spinoza.

The work is a critique of what Deleuze calls 'representation': a mode of thought where things become intelligible only by being placed under concepts, compared, categorized, and recognized. For example: this object is a tree because it fits the basic conceptual identity of “tree.” Instead of treating identity as basic and difference as secondary, Deleuze treats difference as primary and identity as a temporary effect. He develops concepts of difference in itself and repetition for itself, that is, concepts of difference and repetition that are logically and metaphysically prior to any concept of identity. True repetition is the repetition of difference.

Some commentators interpret the book as Deleuze's attempt to rewrite Immanuel Kant's Critique of Pure Reason (1781) from the viewpoint of genesis itself.

== Survey outline of the work ==
Difference and Repetition contains five chapters, along with a preface, introduction, and conclusion.

=== Preface ===
Deleuze uses the preface to relate the work to other texts. He describes his philosophical motivation as "a generalized anti-Hegelianism" (xix) and notes that the forces of difference and repetition can serve as conceptual substitutes for identity and negation in Hegel. The importance of this terminological change is that difference and repetition are both positive forces with unpredictable effects. Deleuze suggests that, unlike Hegel, he creates concepts out of a joyful and creative logic that resists the dualism of dialectic: "I make, remake and unmake my concepts along a moving horizon, from an always decentered centre, from an always displaced periphery which repeats and differentiates them" (xxi).

In the preface to the English edition, Deleuze highlights the third chapter (The Image of Thought) as foreshadowing his later work with Félix Guattari.

He also suggests not only that "conclusions should be read at the outset," but also that "This is true of the present book, the conclusion of which could make reading the rest unnecessary" (ix).

=== Introduction: Repetition and Difference ===
Deleuze uses the introduction to clarify the term "repetition." Deleuze's repetition can be understood by contrasting it to generality. Both words describe events that have some underlying connections.

Generality refers to events that are connected through cycles, equalities, and laws. Most phenomena that can be directly described by science are generalities. Seemingly isolated events will occur in the same way over and over again because they are governed by the same laws. Water will flow downhill and sunlight will create warmth because of principles that apply broadly. In the human realm, behavior that accords with norms and laws counts as generality for similar reasons. Science deals mostly with generalities because it seeks to predict reality using reduction and equivalence.

Repetition, for Deleuze, can only describe a unique series of things or events. The Borges story, in which Pierre Menard reproduces the exact text of Miguel de Cervantes's Don Quixote, is a quintessential repetition: the repetition of Cervantes' work by Menard takes on a magical quality by virtue of its translation into a different time and place. Art is often a source of repetition because no artistic use of an element is ever truly equivalent to other uses.

For humans, repetition is inherently transgressive. As in Masochism: Coldness and Cruelty, Deleuze identifies humor and irony as lines of escape from the generalities of society. Humor and irony are in league with repetition because they create distance from laws and norms even while re-enacting them.

Deleuze describes repetition as a shared value of an otherwise rather disparate trio: Kierkegaard, Nietzsche, and Péguy. He also connects the idea to Freud's death drive.

He goes on to define repetition as "difference without a concept" (13). Repetition is thus reliant on difference more deeply than it is opposed. Further, profound repetition will be characterized by profound difference.

=== I. Difference in Itself ===
Deleuze paints a picture of philosophical history in which difference has long been subordinated to four pillars of reason: identity, opposition, analogy, and resemblance. He argues that difference has been treated as a secondary characteristic which emerges when one compares pre-existing things; these things can then be said to have differences. This network of direct relations between identities roughly overlays a much more subtle and involuted network of real differences: gradients, intensities, overlaps, and so forth (50).

The chapter contains a discussion of how various philosophers have treated the emergence of difference within Being. This section uses Duns Scotus, Spinoza, and others to make the case that "there has only ever been one ontological proposition: Being is univocal. ... A single voice raises the clamor of being" (35). One then tries to understand the nature of differences that arise within Being. Deleuze describes how Hegel took contradiction—pure opposition—to be the principle underlying all difference and consequently to be the explanatory principle of all the world's texture. He accuses this conception of having a theological and metaphysical slant.

Deleuze proposes (citing Leibniz) that difference is better understood through the use of dx, the differential. A derivative, dy/dx, determines the structure of a curve while nonetheless existing just outside the curve itself; that is, by describing a virtual tangent (46). Deleuze argues that difference should fundamentally be the object of affirmation and not negation. As per Nietzsche, negation becomes secondary and epiphenomenal in relation to this primary force.

=== II. Repetition for Itself ===
The chapter describes three different levels of time within which repetition occurs. Deleuze takes as axiomatic the notion that there is no time but the present, which contains past and future. These layers describe different ways in which past and future can be inscribed in a present. As this inscription grows more complicated, the status of the present itself becomes more abstract.

==== 1. Passive synthesis ====
Basic processes of the universe have a momentum that they carry into each present moment. A 'contraction' of reality refers to the collection of a diffuse ongoing force into the present. Prior thought and behavior, all substance performs contraction. "We are made of contracted water, earth, light, and air...Every organism, in its receptive and perceptual elements, but also in its viscera, is a sum of contractions, of retentions and expectations" (73).

Passive synthesis is exemplified by habit. Habit incarnates the past (and gestures to the future) in the present by transforming the weight of experience into an urgency. Habit creates a multitude of "larval selves," each of which functions like a small ego with desires and satisfactions. In Freudian discourse, this is the domain of bound excitations associated with the pleasure principle.

Deleuze cites Hume and Bergson as relevant to his understanding of the passive synthesis.

==== 2. Active synthesis ====
The second level of time is organized by the active force of memory, which introduces discontinuity into the passage of time by sustaining relationships between more distant events. A discussion of destiny makes clear how memory transforms time and enacts a more profound form of repetition:

Destiny never consists in step-by-step deterministic relations between presents which succeed one another according to the order of a represented time. Rather, it implies between successive presents non-localisable connections, actions at a distance, systems of replay, resonance and echoes, objective chances, signs, signals, and roles which transcend spatial locations and temporal successions. (83)

Relative to the passive synthesis of habit, memory is virtual and vertical. It deals with events in their depth and structure rather than in their contiguity in time. Where passive syntheses created a field of 'me's,' active synthesis is performed by 'I.' In the Freudian register, this synthesis describes the displaced energy of Eros, which becomes a searching and problematizing force rather than a simple stimulus to gratification.

Proust and Lacan are key authors for this layer.

==== 3. Empty time ====
The third layer of time still exists in the present, but it does so in a way that breaks free from the simple repetition of time. This level refers to an ultimate event so powerful that it becomes omnipresent. It is a great symbolic event, like the murder to be committed by Oedipus or Hamlet. Upon rising to this level, an actor effaces herself as such and joins the abstract realm of eternal return. The me and the I give way to "the man without name, without family, without qualities, without self or I...the already-Overman whose scattered members gravitate around the sublime image" (90).

Empty time is associated with Thanatos, a desexualized energy that runs through all matter and supersedes the particularity of an individual psychic system. Deleuze is careful to point out that there is no reason for Thanatos to produce a specifically destructive impulse or 'death instinct' in the subject; he conceives of Thanatos as simply indifferent.

Nietzsche, Borges, and Joyce are Deleuze's authors for the third time.

=== III. The Image of Thought ===
This chapter takes aim at an "image of thought" that permeates both popular and philosophical discourse. According to this image, thinking naturally gravitates towards truth. Thought is divided easily into categories of truth and error. The model for thought comes from the educational institution, in which a master sets a problem and the pupil produces a solution which is either true or false. This image of the subject supposes that there are different faculties, each of which ideally grasps the particular domain of reality to which it is most suited.

In philosophy, this conception results in discourses predicated on the argument that "Everybody knows..." the truth of some basic idea. Descartes, for example, appeals to the idea that everyone can at least think and therefore exists. Deleuze points out that philosophy of this type attempts to eliminate all objective presuppositions while maintaining subjective ones.

Deleuze maintains, with Artaud, that real thinking is one of the most difficult challenges there is. Thinking requires a confrontation with stupidity, the state of being formlessly human without engaging any real problems. One discovers that the real path to truth is through the production of sense: the creation of a texture for thought that relates it to its object. Sense is the membrane that relates thought to its other.

Accordingly, learning is not the memorization of facts but the coordination of thought with a reality. "As a result, 'learning' always takes place in and through the unconscious, thereby establishing the bond of a profound complicity between nature and mind" (165).

Deleuze's alternate image of thought is based on difference, which creates a dynamism that traverses individual faculties and conceptions. This thought is fundamentally energetic and asignifying: if it produces propositions, these are wholly secondary to its development.

At the end of the chapter, Deleuze sums up the image of thought he critiques with eight attributes:

(1) the postulate of the principle, or the Cogitatio natural universalis (good will of the thinker and good nature of thought); (2) the postulate of the ideal, or common sense (common sense as the concordia facultatum and good sense as the distribution which guarantees this concord); (3) the postulate of the model, or of recognition (recognition inviting all the faculties to exercise themselves upon an object supposedly the same, and the consequent possibility of error in the distribution when one faculty confuses one of its objects with a different object of another faculty); (4) the postulate of the element or of representation (when difference is subordinated to the complementary dimensions of the Same and the Similar, the Analogous and the Opposed); (5) the postulate of the negative, or of error (in which error expresses everything which can go wrong in thought, but only as the product of external mechanisms); (6) the postulate of logical function, or the proposition (designation is taken to be the locus of truth, sense being no more than the neutralized double or the infinite doubling of the proposition); (7) the postulate of modality, or solutions (problems being materially traced from propositions or indeed, formally defined by the possibility of their being solved); (8) the postulate of the end, or result, the postulate of knowledge (the subordination of learning to knowledge, and of culture to method). (167)

=== IV. Ideas and the Synthesis of Difference ===
This chapter expands on the argument that difference underlies thought by proposing a conception of Ideas based on difference.

Deleuze returns to his substitution of the differential (dx) for negation (-x), arguing that Ideas can be conceived as "a system of differential relations between reciprocally determined genetic elements" (173-4). Ideas are multiplicities—that is, they are neither many nor one, but a form of organization between abstract elements that can be actualized in different domains. One example is of organisms. An organism actualizes itself according to a schema that can be varied but nevertheless defines relations between its components. Its complexity is achieved by progressive breaks in symmetry that begin with small distinctions in an embryonic mass.

The term 'virtual' is used to describe this type of (nevertheless real) entity. The notion of virtuality emphasizes the way in which the set of relations themselves are prior to instances of these relations, called actualizations.

=== V. Asymmetrical Synthesis of the Sensible ===
This chapter continues the discussion of the play of difference and explains how sense can arise from it. To do so, it engages with scientific and mathematical concepts that relate to difference, in particular, classical thermodynamic theory.

==== Intensive and Extensive ====
One major theme is the intensive, which opposes (and for Deleuze, precedes) the extensive. Extensity refers to the actualized dimensions of a phenomenon: its height, its specific components. In science, an object's intensive properties are those, like density and specific heat, that do not change with quantity. Correspondingly, while extensive properties can be subject to division (the object can be cut in half), intensive qualities cannot be simply reduced or divided without transforming their bearer entirely.

There is an intensive space, called spatium, which is virtual and whose implications govern the eventual production of extensive space. This spatium is the cosmic analogue of the Idea; the mechanism of abstract relations becoming actualized is the same.

Intensity governs the basic processes through which differences interact and shape the world. "It is intensity which is immediately expressed in the basic spatio-temporal dynamisms and determines an 'indistinct' differential relation in the Idea to incarnate itself in a distinct quality and a distinguished extensity" (245).

==== Modes of Thought ====
Deleuze attacks good sense and common sense. Good sense treats the universe statistically and attempts to optimize it to produce the best outcome. Good sense may be rationalist, but it does not affirm fate or difference; it has an interest in reducing rather than amplifying the power of difference. It takes the economic view in which value is an average of expected values and present and future can be interchanged on the basis of a specific discount rate.

Common sense is the ability to recognize and react to categories of objects. Common sense complements good sense and allows it to function; 'recognition' of the object enables 'prediction' and the cancellation of danger (along with other possibilities of difference).

To both common sense and good sense, Deleuze opposes paradox. Paradox serves as the stimulus to real thought and to philosophy because it forces thought to confront its limits.

==== Individuation ====
The coalescence of 'individuals' out of the cosmic flow of matter is a slow and incomplete process. "Individuation is mobile, strangely supple, fortuitous and endowed with fringes and margins; all because the intensities which contribute to it communicate with each other, envelop other intensities, and are in turn enveloped" (254). That is, even after individuation takes place, the world does not become passive background or stage on which newly autonomous actors relate to each other. Individuals remain bound to the underlying forces that constitute them all, and these forces can interact and develop without individual approval.

The embryo enacts the drama of individuation. In the process, it subjects itself to dynamics that would tear apart a fully individuated organism. The power of individuation lies not in the development of a final I or self, but in the ability of the deeper dynamics to incarnate themselves in a being that gains additional powers by virtue of its materiality. Individuation makes possible a drama described as a confrontation with the face of the Other. Distinct from the singular form of Levinasian ethics, this scene is important for Deleuze because it represents the possibility and openness associated with an individuated unknown.

== Social and political commentary ==
Deleuze occasionally departs from the realm of pure philosophy to make explicitly sociopolitical statements. They include:

"We claim that there are two ways to appeal to 'necessary destructions': that of the poet, who speaks in the name of a creative power, capable of overturning all orders and representations in order to affirm Difference in the state of permanent revolution which characterizes eternal return; and that of the politician, who is above all concerned to deny that which 'differs,' so as to conserve or prolong an established historical order" (53).

"Real revolutions have the atmosphere of fêtes. Contradiction is not the weapon of the proletariat but, rather, the manner in which the bourgeoisie defends and preserves itself, the shadow behind which it maintains its claim to decide what the problems are" (268).

"The more our daily life appears standardised, stereotyped, and subject to an accelerated reproduction of objects of consumption, the more art must be injected into it in order to extract from it that little difference which plays simultaneously between other levels of repetition, and even in order to make the two extremes resonate—namely, the habitual series of consumption and the instinctual series of destruction and death" (293).

== See also ==
- Erewhon § Influence and legacy

== Bibliography ==
- Ansell-Pearson, Keith. Germinal Life: The Repetition and Difference of Deleuze. New York and London: Routledge, 1999.
- Bryant, Levi R. Difference and Givenness: Deleuze's Transcendental Empiricism and the Ontology of Immanence. Evanston, Ill. : Northwestern University Press, 2008.
- Foucault, Michel. "Theatrum Philosophicum." Trans. Donald F. Brouchard and Sherry Simon. In Aesthetics, Method, and Epistemology: Essential Works of Foucault, 1954–1984, Vol. 2. Ed. James D. Faubion. London: Penguin, 2000. 343-368.
- Hughes, Joe. Deleuze's 'Difference and Repetition': A Reader's Guide. New York and London: Continuum, 2009.
- Somers-Hall, Henry. Deleuze's 'Difference and Repetition: An Edinburgh Philosophical Guide. Edinburgh: Edinburgh University Press, 2013
- Williams, James. Gilles Deleuze’s 'Difference and Repetition': A Critical Introduction and Guide. Edinburgh: Edinburgh University Press, 2003.
