= Nietzsche and Philosophy =

1962 book by Gilles Deleuze

- Cover of the first edition
- Author: Gilles Deleuze
- Original title: Nietzsche et la philosophie
- Translator: Hugh Tomlinson
- Language: French
- Series: Bibliothèque de philosophie contemporaine
- Subject: Friedrich Nietzsche
- Publisher: Presses Universitaires de France, Columbia University Press
- Publication date: 1962
- Publication place: France
- English publication date: 1983
- Media type: Print (Hardcover and Paperback)
- Pages: 221 (Columbia University Press edition)
- ISBN: 0-231-05669-9 (English edition)

Nietzsche and Philosophy (French: Nietzsche et la philosophie) is a 1962 book about Friedrich Nietzsche by the philosopher Gilles Deleuze.

== See also ==
- Immanent evaluation
