= Gilles Deleuze =

French philosopher (1925–1995)

- Born: Gilles Louis René Deleuze; 18 January 1925; Paris, France
- Died: 4 November 1995 (aged 70); Paris, France

Education
- Education: University of Paris (BA, MA, DrE)
- Doctoral advisor: Ferdinand Alquié; Maurice de Gandillac
- Other advisors: Georges Canguilhem; Jean Hyppolite; Jean Wahl

Philosophical work
- Era: 20th-century philosophy
- Region: Western philosophy
- School: Continental philosophy; Post-Marxism; French Nietzscheanism; Materialism; Post-structuralism; Empiricism
- Institutions: University of Paris; University of Lyon; University of Paris VIII
- Doctoral students: See list: Éric Alliez; Noëlle Châtelet; Sarah Kofman
- Notable students: See list: Pascale Criton; Jean-Luc Marion; Claire Parnet; Anne Querrien; André Scala
- Main interests: Aesthetics; history of Western philosophy; literary theory; metaphilosophy; metaphysics; epistemology; social philosophy; psychoanalysis; semiotics (film semiotics)
- Notable ideas: List: Affect and percept; Arborescent; Assemblage; Body without organs; Desiring-production; Deterritorialization; Event; Haecceity; Identity–difference distinction; Immanent evaluation; Individuation; Line of flight; Minority; Molar configuration; Movement-image vs. time-image; Multiplicity; Plane of immanence; Reterritorialization; Rhizome; Schizoanalysis; Societies of control; Socius; Subjectification; Transcendental empiricism; Univocity of being; Virtuality

Gilles Louis René Deleuze (Note: /dəˈluːz/ də-LOOZ; French: [ʒil dəløz]) (18 January 1925 – 4 November 1995) was a French philosopher who, from the early 1950s until his death, wrote on a variety of subjects including ontology, social critique, film theory, and fine art. His most popular works were the two volumes of Capitalism and Schizophrenia: Anti-Oedipus (1972) and A Thousand Plateaus (1980), both co-written with long-term collaborator Félix Guattari. His metaphysical treatise Difference and Repetition (1968) is considered to be his magnum opus. (Note: "Difference and Repetition is definitely the most important work published by Deleuze." (Edouard Morot-Sir, from the back cover of the first edition of the English translation)) (Note: James Williams: "It is nothing less than a revolution in philosophy and stands out as one of the great philosophical works of the twentieth century" (James Williams, Gilles Deleuze's Difference and Repetition: A Critical Introduction and Guide [Edinburgh UP, 2003], p. 1).)

A significant part of Deleuze's oeuvre is devoted to the radical reinterpretation of important figures in the history of philosophy including the Stoics, Leibniz, Hume, Kant, Nietzsche, Spinoza, and Bergson. A. W. Moore, citing Bernard Williams's criteria for a great thinker, ranks Deleuze among the "greatest philosophers". Although he once characterized himself as a "pure metaphysician", his concepts have influenced many fields and been applied across art, literary theory, musicology and sociology amongst others and is frequently associated with post-structuralism and postmodernism.

== Biography ==
=== Early life and education ===
Gilles Deleuze was born into a middle-class family in Paris and lived there for most of his life. His mother was Odette Camaüer and his father, Louis, was an engineer. His initial schooling was undertaken during World War II, during which time he attended the Lycée Carnot. He also spent a year in khâgne at the Lycée Henri IV. During the Nazi occupation of France, Deleuze's brother, three years his senior, Georges, was arrested for his participation in the French Resistance, and died while in transit to a concentration camp. In 1944, Deleuze went to study at the Sorbonne. His teachers there included several noted specialists in the history of philosophy, such as Georges Canguilhem, Jean Hyppolite, Ferdinand Alquié, and Maurice de Gandillac. Deleuze's lifelong interest in the canonical figures of modern philosophy owed much to these teachers.

=== Career ===
Deleuze passed the agrégation in philosophy in 1948, and taught at various lycées (Amiens, Orléans, Louis le Grand) until 1957, when he took up a position at the University of Paris. In 1953, he published his first monograph, Empiricism and Subjectivity, on David Hume. This monograph was based on his 1947 diplôme d'études supérieures (DES) thesis, roughly equivalent to an M.A. thesis, which was conducted under the direction of Jean Hyppolite and Georges Canguilhem. From 1960 to 1964, he held a research fellow position at the Centre National de Recherche Scientifique. During this time he published the seminal Nietzsche and Philosophy (1962) and befriended Michel Foucault. From 1964 to 1969, he was a professor at the University of Lyon. In 1968, Deleuze defended his two DrE dissertations amid the ongoing May 68 demonstrations; he later published his two dissertations under the titles Difference and Repetition (supervised by Gandillac) and Expressionism in Philosophy: Spinoza (supervised by Alquié).

In 1969, he was appointed to the University of Paris VIII, an experimental school organized to implement educational reform. This new university drew a number of well-known academics, including Foucault (who suggested Deleuze's hiring) and the psychoanalyst Félix Guattari. Deleuze taught at Paris VIII until his retirement in 1987.

=== Death ===
Deleuze, who had suffered from respiratory ailments from a young age, developed tuberculosis in 1968 and underwent lung removal (he was an avid smoker). He suffered increasingly severe respiratory symptoms for the rest of his life. In the last years of his life, simple tasks such as writing required laborious effort. Overwhelmed by his respiratory problems, he died by suicide on 4 November 1995, throwing himself from the window of his apartment.

Before his death, Deleuze had announced his intention to write a book entitled La Grandeur de Marx (The Greatness of Marx), and left behind two chapters of an unfinished project entitled Ensembles and Multiplicities (these chapters have been published as the essays "Immanence: A Life" and "The Actual and the Virtual"). He is buried in the cemetery of the village of Saint-Léonard-de-Noblat.

== Philosophy ==
Deleuze's works fall into two groups: on the one hand, monographs interpreting the work of other philosophers (Baruch Spinoza, Gottfried Wilhelm Leibniz, David Hume, Immanuel Kant, Friedrich Nietzsche, Henri Bergson, Michel Foucault) and artists (Marcel Proust, Franz Kafka, Francis Bacon); on the other, eclectic philosophical tomes organized by concept (e.g., difference, sense, event, economy, cinema, desire, philosophy). However, both of these aspects are seen by his critics and analysts as often overlapping, in particular, due to his prose and the unique mapping of his books that allow for multifaceted readings.

=== Metaphysics ===
Deleuze's main philosophical project in the works he wrote prior to his collaborations with Guattari can be summarized as an inversion of the traditional metaphysical relationship between identity and difference. Traditionally, difference is seen as derivative from identity: e.g., saying that "X is different from Y" entails some X and Y with at least relatively stable identities (as in Plato's forms). Deleuze, on the other hand, claims that all identities are effects of difference. Identities are neither logically nor metaphysically prior to difference, Deleuze argues, "given that there exist differences of nature between things of the same genus." That is, not only are no two things ever the same, the categories themselves, used to identify individuals in the first place, derive from differences. Apparent identities such as "X" are composed of endless series of differences, where X is the difference between x and x′, whereas x′ is the difference between..., and so forth. Difference, in other words, goes all the way down. (Note: see Bradley's regress) To confront reality honestly, Deleuze argues, beings must be grasped exactly as they are, and concepts of identity (forms, categories, resemblances, unities of apperception, predicates, etc.) fail to attain what he calls "difference in itself." "If philosophy has a positive and direct relation to things, it is only insofar as philosophy claims to grasp the thing itself, according to what it is, in its difference from everything it is not, in other words, in its internal difference."

Like Kant, Deleuze considers traditional notions of space and time as unifying forms imposed by the subject. He, therefore, concludes that pure difference is non-spatiotemporal; it is an idea, what Deleuze calls "the virtual". (The coinage refers to Proust's definition of what is constant in both the past and the present: "real without being actual, ideal without being abstract.") While Deleuze's virtual ideas superficially resemble Plato's forms and Kant's ideas of pure reason, they are not originals or models, nor do they transcend possible experience; instead they are the conditions of actual experience, the internal difference in itself. "The concept they [the conditions] form is identical to its object." A Deleuzean idea or concept of difference is therefore not a wraith-like abstraction of an experienced thing, it is a real system of differential relations that creates actual spaces, times, and sensations.

Simultaneously, Deleuze claims that being is univocal, i.e., that all of its senses are affirmed in one voice. Deleuze borrows the doctrine of ontological univocity from the medieval philosopher John Duns Scotus. In medieval disputes over the nature of God, many eminent theologians and philosophers (such as Thomas Aquinas) held that when one says that "God is good", God's goodness is only analogous to human goodness. Scotus argued to the contrary that when one says that "God is good", the goodness in question is exactly the same sort of goodness that is meant when one says "Jane is good". That is, God only differs from humans in degree, and properties such as goodness, power, reason, and so forth are univocally applied, regardless of whether one is talking about God, a person, or a flea.

Deleuze adapts the doctrine of univocity to claim that being is, univocally, difference. "With univocity, however, it is not the differences which are and must be: it is being which is Difference, in the sense that it is said of difference. Moreover, it is not we who are univocal in a Being which is not; it is we and our individuality which remains equivocal in and for a univocal Being." Here Deleuze at once echoes and inverts Spinoza, who maintained that everything that exists is a modification of the one substance, God or Nature. For Deleuze, there is no one substance, only an always-differentiating process, an origami cosmos, always folding, unfolding, refolding. Deleuze summarizes this ontology in the paradoxical formula "pluralism = monism".

Difference and Repetition (1968) is Deleuze's most sustained and systematic attempt to work out the details of such a metaphysics, but his other works develop similar ideas. In Nietzsche and Philosophy (1962), for example, reality is a play of forces; in Anti-Oedipus (1972), a "body without organs"; in What is Philosophy? (1991), a "plane of immanence" or "chaosmos".

=== Epistemology ===
Deleuze's unusual metaphysics entails an equally atypical epistemology, or what he calls a transformation of "the image of thought". According to Deleuze, the traditional image of thought, found in philosophers such as Aristotle, René Descartes, and Edmund Husserl, misconceives thinking as a mostly unproblematic business. Truth may be hard to discover—it may require a life of pure theorizing, or rigorous computation, or systematic doubt—but thinking is able, at least in principle, to correctly grasp facts, forms, ideas, etc. It may be practically impossible to attain a God's-eye, neutral point of view, but that is the ideal to approximate: a disinterested pursuit that results in a determinate, fixed truth; an orderly extension of common sense. Deleuze rejects this view as papering over the metaphysical flux, instead claiming that genuine thinking is a violent confrontation with reality, an involuntary rupture of established categories. Truth changes thought; it alters what people think is possible. By setting aside the assumption that thinking has a natural ability to recognize the truth, Deleuze says, people attain a "thought without image", a thought always determined by problems rather than solving them. "All this, however, presupposes codes or axioms which do not result by chance, but which do not have an intrinsic rationality either. It's just like theology: everything about it is quite rational if you accept sin, the immaculate conception, and the incarnation. Reason is always a region carved out of the irrational—not sheltered from the irrational at all, but traversed by it and only defined by a particular kind of relationship among irrational factors. Underneath all reason lies delirium, and drift."

Deleuze at times refers to his philosophy as a transcendental empiricism (empirisme transcendantal), alluding to Kant. In Kant's transcendental idealism, experience only makes sense when organized by intuitions (namely, space and time) and concepts (such as causality). Assuming the content of these intuitions and concepts to be qualities of the world as it exists independently of human perceptual access, according to Kant, spawns seductive but senseless metaphysical beliefs (for example, extending the concept of causality beyond possible experience results in unverifiable speculation about a first cause). Deleuze inverts the Kantian arrangement: experience exceeds human concepts by presenting novelty, and this raw experience of difference actualizes an idea, unfettered by prior categories, forcing the invention of new ways of thinking.

The Logic of Sense, published in 1969, is one of Deleuze's most peculiar works in the field of epistemology. Michel Foucault, in his essay "Theatrum Philosophicum" about the book, attributed this to how he begins with his metaphysics but approaches it through language and truth; the book is focused on "the simple condition that instead of denouncing metaphysics as the neglect of being, we force it to speak of extrabeing". In it, he refers to epistemological paradoxes: in the first series, as he analyzes Lewis Carroll's Alice in Wonderland, he remarks that "the personal self requires God and the world in general. But when substantives and adjectives begin to dissolve, when the names of pause and rest are carried away by the verbs of pure becoming and slide into the language of events, all identity disappears from the self, the world, and God."

Deleuze's peculiar readings of the history of philosophy stem from this unusual epistemological perspective. To read a philosopher is no longer to aim at finding a single, correct interpretation, but is instead to present a philosopher's attempt to grapple with the problematic nature of reality. "Philosophers introduce new concepts, they explain them, but they don't tell us, not completely anyway, the problems to which those concepts are a response. [...] The history of philosophy, rather than repeating what a philosopher says, has to say what he must have taken for granted, what he didn't say but is nonetheless present in what he did say."

Likewise, rather than seeing philosophy as a timeless pursuit of truth, reason, or universals, Deleuze defines philosophy as the creation of concepts. For Deleuze, concepts are not identity conditions or propositions, but metaphysical constructions that define a range of thinking, such as Plato's ideas, Descartes's cogito, or Kant's doctrine of the faculties. A philosophical concept "posits itself and its object at the same time as it is created." In Deleuze's view, then, philosophy more closely resembles practical or artistic production than it does an adjunct to a definitive scientific description of a pre-existing world (as in the tradition of John Locke or Willard Van Orman Quine).

In his later work (from roughly 1981 onward), Deleuze sharply distinguishes art, philosophy, and science as three distinct disciplines, each relating to reality in different ways. While philosophy creates concepts, the arts create novel qualitative combinations of sensation and feeling (what Deleuze calls "percepts" and "affects"), and the sciences create quantitative theories based on fixed points of reference such as the speed of light or absolute zero (which Deleuze calls "functives"). According to Deleuze, none of these disciplines enjoy primacy over the others: they are different ways of organizing the metaphysical flux, "separate melodic lines in constant interplay with one another." For example, Deleuze does not treat cinema as an art representing an external reality, but as an ontological practice that creates different ways of organizing movement and time. Philosophy, science, and art are equally, and essentially, creative and practical. Hence, instead of asking traditional questions of identity such as "is it true?" or "what is it?", Deleuze proposes that inquiries should be functional or practical: "what does it do?" or "how does it work?"

=== Values ===
In ethics and politics Deleuze again echoes Spinoza, albeit in a sharply Nietzschean key. Following his rejection of any metaphysics based on identity, Deleuze criticizes the notion of 'individual' as arrested or halted from differentiation. Opposing the very origin of the word, that is in‑divisible, (Note: from Latin individuus ('indivisible'): in- ('not, opposite of') + dividuus ('divisible'); as a noun, meant 'an atom, indivisible particle' (early 15c.)) he argued for a rather processual view where, guided by the naturalistic ethics of Spinoza and Nietzsche, Deleuze instead seeks to understand individuals and their moralities as products of the organization of pre-individual desires and powers.

In the two volumes of Capitalism and Schizophrenia, Anti-Oedipus (1972) and A Thousand Plateaus (1980), Deleuze and Guattari describe history as a congealing and regimentation of "desiring-production" (a concept combining features of Freudian drives and Marxist labor) into the modern individual (typically neurotic and repressed), the nation-state (a society of continuous control), and capitalism (an anarchy domesticated into infantilizing commodification). Deleuze, following Karl Marx, welcomes capitalism's destruction of traditional social hierarchies as liberating but inveighs against its homogenization of all values to the aims of the market.

The first part of Capitalism and Schizophrenia undertakes a universal history and posits the existence of a separate socius (the social body that takes credit for production) for each mode of production: the earth for the tribe, the body of the despot for the empire, and capital for capitalism."

In his 1990 essay "Postscript on the Societies of Control" ("Post-scriptum sur les sociétés de contrôle"), Deleuze builds on Foucault's notion of the society of discipline to argue that society is undergoing a shift in structure and control. Where societies of discipline were characterized by discrete physical enclosures (such as schools, factories, prisons, office buildings, etc.), institutions and technologies introduced since World War II have dissolved the boundaries between these enclosures. As a result, social coercion and discipline have moved into the lives of individuals considered as "masses, samples, data, markets, or 'banks'." The mechanisms of modern societies of control are described as continuous, following and tracking individuals throughout their existence via transaction records, mobile location tracking, and other personally identifiable information.

But how does Deleuze square his pessimistic diagnoses with his ethical naturalism? Deleuze claims that standards of value are internal or immanent: to live well is to fully express one's power, to go to the limits of one's potential, rather than to judge what exists by non-empirical, transcendent standards. Modern society still suppresses difference and alienates people from what they can do. To affirm reality, which is a flux of change and difference, established identities must be overturned and so become all that they can become—though exactly what cannot be known in advance. The pinnacle of Deleuzean practice, then, is creativity. "Herein, perhaps, lies the secret: to bring into existence and not to judge. If it is so disgusting to judge, it is not because everything is of equal value, but on the contrary, because what has value can be made or distinguished only by defying judgment. What expert judgment, in art, could ever bear on the work to come?"

=== Deleuze's interpretations ===
Deleuze's studies of individual philosophers and artists are purposely heterodox. Deleuze once famously described his method of interpreting philosophers as "buggery (enculage)", as sneaking behind an author and producing an offspring which is recognizably his, yet also monstrous and different.

The various monographs thus are not attempts to present what Nietzsche or Spinoza strictly intended, but re-stagings of their ideas in different and unexpected ways. Deleuze's peculiar readings aim to enact the creativity he believes is the acme of philosophical practice. A parallel in painting Deleuze points to is Francis Bacon's Study after Velázquez—it is quite beside the point to say that Bacon "gets Velasquez wrong". Similar considerations apply, in Deleuze's view, to his own uses of mathematical and scientific terms, pace critics such as Alan Sokal: "I'm not saying that Resnais and Prigogine, or Godard and Thom, are doing the same thing. I'm pointing out, rather, that there are remarkable similarities between scientific creators of functions and cinematic creators of images. And the same goes for philosophical concepts, since there are distinct concepts of these spaces."

=== Similarities with Heidegger ===
From the 1930s onward, German philosopher Martin Heidegger wrote in a series of manuscripts and books on concepts of Difference, Identity, Representation, and Event; notably among these the Beiträge zur Philosophie (Vom Ereignis) (Written 1936–38; published posthumously 1989); none of the relevant texts were translated into French by Deleuze's death in 1995, excluding any strong possibility of appropriation. However, Heidegger's early work can be traced through mathematician Albert Lautman, who drew heavily from Heidegger's Sein und Zeit and Vom Wesen des Grundes (1928), which James Bahoh describes as having "...decisive influence on the twentieth century mathematician and philosopher [...] whose theory of dialectical Ideas Deleuze appropriated and modified for his own use." The similarities between Heidegger's later, post-turn, 1930–1976 thought and Deleuze's early works in the '60s and '70s are generally described by Deleuze-scholar Daniel W. Smith in the following way:

"Difference and Repetition could be read as a response to Being and Time (for Deleuze, Being is difference, and time is repetition)."

Bahoh continues in saying that: "...then Beiträge could be read as Difference and Repetition's unknowing and anachronistic doppelgänger." Deleuze and Heidegger's philosophy is considered to converge on the topics of Difference and the Event. Where, for Heidegger, an evental being is constituted in part by difference as "...an essential dimension of the concept of event"; for Deleuze, being is difference, and difference "differentiates by way of events." In contrast to this, however, Jussi Backman argues that, for Heidegger, being is united only insofar as it consists of and is difference, or rather as the movement of difference, not too dissimilar to Deleuze's later claims:

"...the unity and univocity of being (in the sense of being), its 'selfsameness,' paradoxically consists exclusively in difference."

This mutual apprehension of a differential, evental ontology led both thinkers into an extended critique of the representation characteristic to Platonic, Aristotelian, and Cartesian thought; as Joe Hughes states: "Difference and Repetition is a detective novel. It tells the story of what some readers of Deleuze might consider a horrendous crime [...]: the birth of representation." Heidegger formed his critiques most decisively in the concept of the fourfold [German: das Geviert], a non-metaphysical grounding for the thing (as opposed to "object") as "ungrounded, mediated, meaningful, and shared" united in an "event of appropriation" [Ereignis]. This evental ontology continues in Identität und Differenz, where the fundamental concept expressed in Difference and Repetition, of dethroning the primacy of identity, can be seen throughout the text. Even in earlier Heideggerian texts such as Sein und Zeit, however, the critique of representation is "...cast in terms of the being of truth, or the processes of uncovering and covering (grounded in Dasein's existence) whereby beings come into and withdraw from phenomenal presence." In parallel, Deleuze's extended critique of representation (in the sense of detailing a "genealogy" of the antiquated beliefs as well) is given "...in terms of being or becoming as difference and repetition, together with genetic processes of individuation whereby beings come to exist and pass out of existence."

Time and space, for both thinkers, is also constituted in nearly identical ways. Time-space in the Beiträge and the three syntheses in Difference and Repetition both apprehend time as grounded in difference, whilst the distinction between the time-space of the world [Welt] and the time-space as the evental production of such a time-space is mirrored by Deleuze's categorization between the temporality of what is actual and temporality of the virtual in the first and the second/third syntheses respectively.

Another parallel can be found in their utilization of so-called "generative paradoxes," or rather problems whose fundamental problematic element is constantly outside the categorical grasp fond of formal, natural, and human sciences. For Heidegger, this is the Earth in the fourfold, something which has as one of its traits the behaviour of "resisting articulation," what he characterizes as a "strife"; for Deleuze, a similar example can be spotted in the paradox of regress, or of indefinite proliferation in the Logic of Sense.

== Legacy ==
=== Reception ===
In the 1960s, Deleuze's portrayal of Nietzsche as a metaphysician of difference rather than a reactionary mystic contributed greatly to the plausibility and popularity of "left-wing Nietzscheanism" as an intellectual stance. His books Difference and Repetition (1968) and The Logic of Sense (1969) led Michel Foucault to declare that "one day, perhaps, this century will be called Deleuzian." (Deleuze, for his part, said Foucault's comment was "a joke meant to make people who like us laugh, and make everyone else livid.") In the 1970s, the Anti-Oedipus, written in a style by turns vulgar and esoteric, offering a sweeping analysis of the family, language, capitalism, and history via eclectic borrowings from primarily Marx, Freud, Lacan, and Nietzsche, but also featuring insights from dozens of other writers, was received as a theoretical embodiment of the anarchic spirit of May 1968. In 1994 and 1995, L'Abécédaire de Gilles Deleuze, an eight-hour series of interviews between Deleuze and Claire Parnet, aired on France's Arte Channel.

In the 1980s and 1990s, almost all of Deleuze's books were translated into English. Deleuze's work is frequently cited in English-speaking academia (in 2007, e.g., he was the 11th most frequently cited author in English-speaking publications in the humanities, between Freud and Kant). In the English-speaking academy, Deleuze's work is typically classified as continental philosophy.

However, some French and some Anglophone philosophers criticised Deleuze's work.

According to Pascal Engel, Deleuze's metaphilosophical approach makes it impossible to reasonably disagree with a philosophical system, and so destroys meaning, truth, and philosophy itself. Engel summarizes Deleuze's metaphilosophy thus: "When faced with a beautiful philosophical concept you should just sit back and admire it. You should not question it."

American philosopher Stanley Rosen objects to Deleuze's interpretation of Nietzsche's eternal return.

Vincent Descombes argues that Deleuze's account of a difference that is not derived from identity (in Nietzsche and Philosophy) is incoherent.

Slavoj Žižek states that the Deleuze of Anti-Oedipus ("arguably Deleuze's worst book"), the "political" Deleuze under the "'bad' influence" of Guattari, ends up, despite protestations to the contrary, as "the ideologist of late capitalism".

==== Allegations of idealism and negligence of material conditions ====
Peter Hallward argues that Deleuze's insistence that being is necessarily creative and always-differentiating entails that his philosophy can offer no insight into, and is supremely indifferent to, the material conditions of existence. Thus Hallward claims that Deleuze's thought is literally other-worldly, aiming only at a passive contemplation of the dissolution of all identity into the theophanic self-creation of nature.

Descombes argues that his analysis of history in Anti-Oedipus is 'utter idealism', criticizing reality for falling short of a non-existent ideal of schizophrenic becoming.

Žižek claims that Deleuze's ontology oscillates between materialism and idealism.

==== Relation with monism ====
Alain Badiou claims that Deleuze's metaphysics only apparently embraces plurality and diversity, remaining at bottom monist. Badiou further argues that, in practical matters, Deleuze's monism entails an ascetic, aristocratic fatalism akin to ancient Stoicism.

American philosopher Todd May argues that Deleuze's claim that difference is ontologically primary ultimately contradicts his embrace of immanence, i.e., his monism. However, May believes that Deleuze can discard the primacy-of-difference thesis, and accept a Wittgensteinian holism without significantly altering his practical philosophy.

It has more recently been argued by the Swedish philosopher Rafael Holmberg that Deleuze's criticism of the history of philosophy as the metaphysical priority of identity over difference is a false distinction, and that Deleuze inadvertently reaches conclusions akin to such idealist philosophers of identity as Schelling.

==== Subjectivity and individuality ====
Other European philosophers have criticized Deleuze's theory of subjectivity. For example, Manfred Frank claims that Deleuze's theory of individuation as a process of bottomless differentiation fails to explain the unity of consciousness.

Žižek also calls Deleuze to task for allegedly reducing the subject to "just another" substance and thereby failing to grasp the nothingness that, according to Lacan and Žižek, defines subjectivity. What remains worthwhile in Deleuze's oeuvre, Žižek finds, are precisely Deleuze's engagements with virtuality as the product of negativity.

==== Science wars ====
In Fashionable Nonsense (1997), physicists Alan Sokal and Jean Bricmont accuse Deleuze of abusing mathematical and scientific terms, particularly by sliding between accepted technical meanings and his own idiosyncratic use of those terms in his works. Sokal and Bricmont state that they don't object to metaphorical reasoning, including with mathematical concepts, but mathematical and scientific terms are useful only insofar as they are precise. They give examples of mathematical concepts being "abused" by taking them out of their intended meaning, rendering the idea into normal language reduces it to truism or nonsense. In their opinion, Deleuze used mathematical concepts about which the typical reader might be not knowledgeable, and thus served to display erudition rather than enlightening the reader. Sokal and Bricmont state that they only deal with the "abuse" of mathematical and scientific concepts and explicitly suspend judgment about Deleuze's wider contributions.

=== Influence ===
Sexuality historian Alison M. Moore argues that other scholars in continental philosophy, feminist studies and sexuality studies have taken Deleuze's analysis of the sexual dynamics of sadism and masochism with a level of uncritical celebration following the 1989 Zone Books translation of the 1967 booklet on Leopold von Sacher-Masoch, Le froid et le cruel (Coldness and Cruelty). In Moore's view, Deleuze's own value placed on difference is poorly reflected in this booklet which fails to differentiate between Masoch's own view of his desire and that imposed upon him by the pathologizing forms of psychiatric thought prevailing in the late nineteenth century which produced the concept of 'masochism' (a term Masoch himself emphatically rejected).

Smith, Protevi and Voss note "Sokal and Bricmont's 1999 intimations" underestimated Deleuze's awareness of mathematics and pointed out several "positive views of Deleuze's use of mathematics as provocations for [...] his philosophical concepts", and that Deleuze's epistemology and ontology can be "brought together" with dynamical systems theory, chaos theory, biology, and geography.

== Personal life ==
Deleuze's outlook on life was sympathetic to transcendental ideas, "nature as god" ethics, and the monist experience. Some of the important ideas he advocated for and found inspiration in include his personally coined expression "pluralism = monism", as well as the concepts of Being and univocity.

He married Denise Paul "Fanny" Grandjouan in 1956. Deleuze was an academic, a husband and a father of two children, and kept his fingernails untrimmed because, as he once explained, he lacked "normal protective fingerprints", and therefore could not "touch an object, particularly a piece of cloth, with the pads of my fingers without sharp pain". Historian James Miller notes a contrast between Deleuze's ideas and his relatively conventional lifestyle, for Deleuze's philosophical explorations on non-normative bodily and consciousness experiences, on revolutionary ways to escape oppressive systems etc., were expressed through intellectual means, his writings and teachings.

Deleuze struggled with alcoholism for much of his life, eventually quitting entirely in the interest of his long-term health. His experience with addiction and drug use made a substantial impact on his philosophy. This can be seen in his musings on the simultaneous potentials and dangers of alternative ways of thinking. It can also be seen in his use of "sobriety" as an interpretive framework.

When once asked to talk about his life, he replied: "Academics' lives are seldom interesting." Deleuze concludes his reply to this critic thus:

What do you know about me, given that I believe in secrecy? ... If I stick where I am, if I don't travel around, like anyone else I make my inner journeys that I can only measure by my emotions, and express very obliquely and circuitously in what I write. ... Arguments from one's own privileged experience are bad and reactionary arguments.

== Works ==
=== Single-authored ===
Original French	English translation
Empirisme et subjectivité (1953)	Empiricism and Subjectivity (1991)
Nietzsche et la philosophie (1962)	Nietzsche and Philosophy (1983)
La philosophie critique de Kant (1963)	Kant's Critical Philosophy (1983)
Proust et les signes (1964, 3rd exp. ed. 1976)	Proust and Signs (1973, 2nd exp. ed. 2000)
Nietzsche (1965)	Pure Immanence (2001)
Le Bergsonisme (1966)	Bergsonism (1988)
Présentation de Sacher-Masoch (1967)	Masochism: Coldness and Cruelty (1989)
Différence et répétition (1968)	Difference and Repetition (1994)
Spinoza et le problème de l'expression (Paris: Éditions de Minuit, 1968 & 1985)	Expressionism in Philosophy: Spinoza (1990)
Logique du sens (1969)	The Logic of Sense (1990)
Dialogues (1977, 2nd exp. ed. 1996, with Claire Parnet)	Dialogues II (1987, 2nd exp. ed. 2002)
One Less Manifesto (1978)	In Superpositions (with Carmelo Bene)
Spinoza – Philosophie pratique, 2nd ed. (Paris: Éditions de Minuit, 1981)	Spinoza: Practical Philosophy (1988)
Francis Bacon – Logique de la sensation (1981)	Francis Bacon: The Logic of Sensation (2003)
Cinéma I: L'image-mouvement (1983)	Cinema 1: The Movement-Image (1986)
Cinéma II: L'image-temps (1985)	Cinema 2: The Time-Image (1989)
Foucault (1986)	Foucault (1988)
Le pli – Leibniz et le baroque (1988)	The Fold: Leibniz and the Baroque (1993)
Périclès et Verdi: La philosophie de Francois Châtelet (1988)	In Dialogues II, revised ed. (2007)
Pourparlers (1990)	Negotiations (1995).
Critique et clinique (1993)	Essays Critical and Clinical (1997)
L'île déserte et autres textes (2002)	Desert Islands and Other Texts 1953–1974 (2003)
Deux régimes de fous et autres textes (2004)	Two Regimes of Madness: Texts and Interviews 1975–1995 (2006)

=== In collaboration with Félix Guattari ===
- Capitalisme et Schizophrénie 1. L'Anti-Œdipe (1972). Trans. Anti-Oedipus (1977).
- On the Line, New York: Semiotext(e), translated by John Johnson (1983).
- Kafka: Pour une Littérature Mineure (1975). Trans. Kafka: Toward a Minor Literature (1986).
- Rhizome (1976). Trans., in revised form, in A Thousand Plateaus (1987).
- Nomadology: The War Machine (1986). Trans. in A Thousand Plateaus (1987).
- Capitalisme et Schizophrénie 2. Mille Plateaux (1980). Trans. A Thousand Plateaus (1987).
- Qu'est-ce que la philosophie? (1991). Trans. What is Philosophy? (1994).
- Part I: Deleuze and Guattari on Anti-Oedipus of Chaosophy: Texts and Interviews 1972–77 (2009). Edited by Sylvère Lotringer (pp. 35–118).

=== In collaboration with Michel Foucault ===
- "Intellectuals and Power: A Discussion Between Gilles Deleuze and Michel Foucault". Telos 16 (Summer 1973). New York: Telos Press (reprinted in L'île déserte et autres textes / Desert Islands and Other Texts; see above)

== Documentaries ==
- L'Abécédaire de Gilles Deleuze, with Claire Parnet, produced by Pierre-André Boutang. Éditions Montparnasse.

== See also ==
- Deleuze and Guattari
- Gilbert Simondon's theory of individuation
- Problem of future contingents
- Speculative realism
- Transcendental nominalism
