= Anne Fagot-Largeault =

French philosopher, psychiatrist, and professor

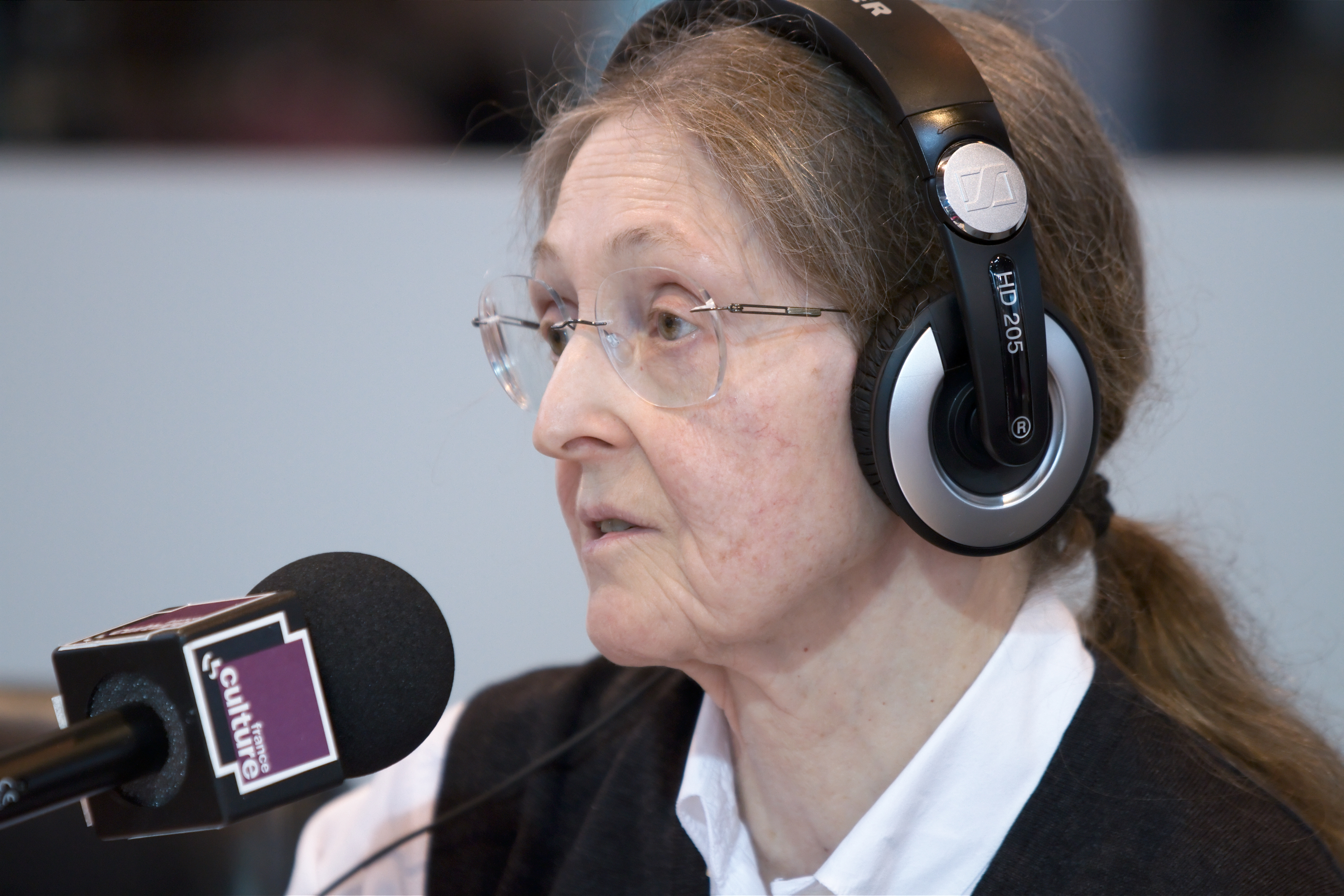
Anne Fagot-Largeault, then guest on the radio show Continent Sciences, hosted live at the Salon du livre de Paris in March 2010

Anne Fagot-Largeault (born September 22, 1938, Paris) is a French philosopher, honorary professor at the Collège de France (chair of philosophy of biological and medical sciences), psychiatrist at the Greater Paris University Hospitals, and a member of the French Academy of sciences since 2002.

== Biography ==
=== Training and education ===
A former student of the École normale supérieure de Jeunes Filles (1957–1961) in the literary field, Anne Fagot-Largeault decided to pursue philosophy, obtaining a certificate in general and physical mathematics and an agrégation in philosophy in 1961. She became a philosophy teacher at the girls' high school in Douai (Hauts-de-France) for four years, and then at the Hélène Boucher high school in Paris for one year. She was chosen by Professor Gilbert Simondon to become his assistant at the Sorbonne from 1966 to 1967. She was seconded to Stanford University from 1967 to 1971, where she studied the philosophy of science (PhD Logic and philosophy of science, Stanford University, US) in 1971. At the University of Paris 12-Val de Marne, Fagot-Largeault was an assistant (1971–1972), assistant professor (1972–1980), and lecturer (1984–1987). She received her doctorate in medicine from the University of Paris (12-Val de Marne), her doctorate in psychiatry (1978), and her doctorate in literature and human sciences from the University of Paris Ouest (Nanterre La Défense) in 1986.

=== Academic background ===
Anne Fagot-Largeault was a professor at the University of Paris 10 (Nanterre La Défense) from 1987 to 1995, and an associate professor at Laval University in Québec, Canada, from 1993 to 1995. She was also a professor at the University of Paris 1 (Panthéon-Sorbonne) from 1995 to 2000, and had a UFR in philosophy, with concurrent parallel hospital activity. She was a member of the Institut universitaire de France. In February–March 1998 she was visiting professor at the Free University of Brussels (Chaïm Perelman Chair). At the University of Paris 1 (Panthéon-Sorbonne), she was Director of the IHPST (Institute of History and Philosophy of Science and Technology), and head of the DEA in History and Philosophy of Science.

Fagot-Largeault was a professor at the Collège de France, holding the Chair of Philosophy of Biological and Medical Sciences from 2000 to 2009. Since then, she has been an honorary professor at the same institution. She was elected correspondent on May 3, 1999, and then member on November 12, 2002, at the French Academy of Sciences of the Institut de France, section: Human Biology and Medical Sciences.

=== Professional and philosophical background ===
Since 1979 Anne Fagot-Largeault has been an attached doctor from 1979 to 1984, and an attached specialist from 1984 to 2003 at the Henri Mondor Hospital in Créteil, France.

Her work focuses on themes in the history and philosophy of life sciences, approached from a theoretical (epistemology, biological ontology) or practical (ethics) perspective. They follow three main directions:

- Diagnostic reasoning, inductive logic, statistics and probabilities, heuristic procedures
- The investigation of causal links, evidence of causality, teleological explanation, causal explanation;
- Ethics and knowledge, clinical research methodology, ethics of bio-medical investigation, biological epistemology, bio-medical anthropology.

Her research on the logic of medical reasoning and the nature of causal explanations originated in relation to Stanford University's program in logic and philosophy of science, and was developed through fruitful contacts with clinical and epidemiological research. Its moral reflection has been enriched and tested by the experience of various Data and Safety Monitoring Committees (overseeing clinical trials in AIDS or cancer patients) and by participation (1990–1998) in the work of the National Consultative Ethics Committee for Life and Health Sciences.

Fagot-Largeault is a founding member of the International Network of Women Philosophers sponsored by UNESCO, which was created on the occasion of International Women's Rights Day on March 8, 2007.

=== Awards and honours ===
- Prize of the Association Confrontations psychiatriques (1985) and Prize of the Dagnan-Bouveret Foundation of the Academy of Sciences (1985) for her book: L'homme bioéthique. Pour une déontologie de la recherche sur le vivant (Maloine, 1985).
- Grammaticakis Neuman Prize from the French Academy of sciences (1995)
- Chevalier of the Légion d'Honneur (1997)
- Member (and President), Institut International de Philosophie
- Officier of the Légion d'Honneur (2005)
- Commandeur of the Légion d'Honneur (2014)
- Officier of the Ordre National du Mérite (2001)
- Commandeur of the Ordre National du Mérite (2010)
- Honorary doctorate from the Faculty of Philosophy, Arts and Letters of the Catholic University of Louvain at the initiative of the members of the Institut supérieur de philosophie (2014)
- Honorary doctorate in philosophy from Laval University (2016)

== Bibliography ==
- L'homme bioéthique. Pour une déontologie de la recherche sur le vivant - Maloine - 1985.
- Médecine et philosophie - PUF, coll. « Éthique et philosophie morale » - January 2010.
- Causal vs. Teleological Explanations of Behavior - University Microfilms - 1971.

Co-authored

- Philosophie des sciences Tome 1 - Daniel Andler, Anne Fagot-Largeault, Bertrand Saint-Sernin - Folio Essais (poche), .
- Philosophie des sciences Tome 2 - Daniel Andler, Anne Fagot-Largeault, Bertrand Saint-Sernin - Folio Essais (poche), .
- Leçon inaugurale d'Anne Fagot-Largeault au Collège de France
