= Brian Massumi =

Canadian philosopher and social theorist

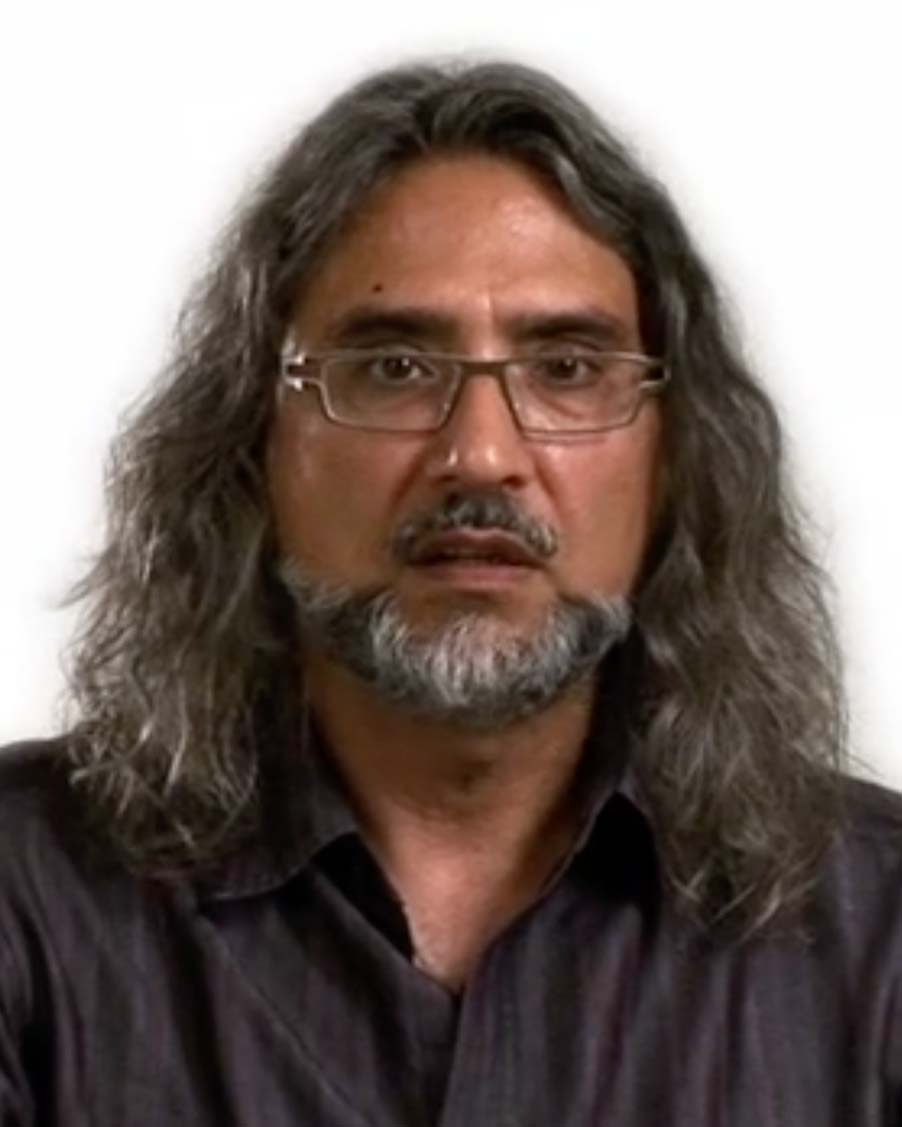
- Born: 1956 (age 69–70); Lorain, Ohio, U.S.

Education
- Education: Brown University (B.A.); Yale University (Ph.D.)
- Thesis: Annotated Translation with Critical Introduction of "Mille Plateaux" by Gilles Deleuze and Felix Guattari (1987)

Philosophical work
- Era: 20th-/21st-century philosophy
- Region: Western philosophy
- School: Process philosophy, poststructuralism, radical empiricism
- Institutions: Université de Montréal
- Main interests: Virtuality, affect, micropolitics, complexity, political economy
- Notable ideas: Thinking-feeling, onto power, bare activity, semblance, surplus value of life, nature–culture continuum, immanent critique

Brian Massumi (/məˈsuːmi/; born 1956) is a Canadian philosopher and social theorist. Massumi's research spans the fields of art, architecture, cultural studies, political theory and philosophy. His work explores the intersection between power, perception, and creativity to develop an approach to thought and social action bridging the aesthetic and political domains. He is a retired professor in the Communications Department of the Université de Montréal.

== Early life ==
Massumi received his B.A. in Comparative Literature at Brown University (1979) and his Ph.D. in French Literature from Yale University (1987). After a Mellon postdoctoral fellowship in the Stanford University Department of French and Italian (1987–1988), he settled in Montréal, Canada, where he taught first at McGill University (Comparative Literature Program) and later at the Université de Montréal (Communication Department), retiring in 2018. Massumi has lectured widely around the world, and his writings have been translated into more than fifteen languages.

== Works ==
Massumi was instrumental in introducing the work of French philosophers Gilles Deleuze and Félix Guattari to the English-speaking world through his translation of their key collaborative work A Thousand Plateaus (1987) and his book A User's Guide to Capitalism and Schizophrenia: Deviations from Deleuze and Guattari (1992). His 1995 essay "The Autonomy of Affect", later integrated into his most well-known work, Parables for the Virtual: Movement, Affect, Sensation (2002), is credited with playing a central role in the development of the interdisciplinary field of affect studies.

Since 2004, he has collaborated with the SenseLab, founded by Erin Manning as an experimental "laboratory for thought in motion" operating at the intersection of philosophy, art, and activism.

=== Philosophy ===
Massumi situates his work in the tradition of process philosophy, which he defines broadly to encompass a range of thinkers whose work privileges concepts of event and emergence. For Massumi, this includes not only Alfred North Whitehead, the philosopher most closely identified with the term, but also Charles Sanders Peirce, Henri Bergson, Gilbert Simondon, Gilles Deleuze, and Félix Guattari, on all of whose work he draws extensively. He articulates process philosophy with William James's radical empiricism, which asserts the primacy of relation. This is the doctrine that relations are real, are directly experienced, and create their terms.

Massumi has also characterized his work as "activist philosophy" (a philosophy for which the ultimate concept is activity rather than substance); "speculative pragmatism" (a philosophy for which present practice bears as much on future potential as on existing functions and known utilities); "ontogenetics" as opposed to ontology (a philosophy for which becoming is primary in relation to being); and "incorporeal materialism" (a philosophy attributing abstract dimensions of reality to the body and matter itself).

=== Theory of power ===
Massumi's earliest work on the theory of power is two-pronged. On the one hand, it examines processes of power centralization tending toward the absolutist state, which he broadly defines as fascist. On the other hand, influenced by the work of Michel Foucault, it examines processes by which power effects are distributed throughout the social field, in particular through the mass production of what he termed "low-level everyday fear." After the 9-11 attacks on the World Trade Towers, his theories of distributed power focused on the doctrine of preemption promulgated by the George W. Bush administration to serve as the framework for the "war on terror."

Massumi argues that preemption is more than a military doctrine, but has engrained itself as an invasive mode of power operating in many forms throughout society. He sees this mode of power as paradoxically productive. He gives it the label "ontopower" (the power to bring to be). Ontopower, according to Massumi, is related to but distinct from disciplinary power and biopower as analyzed by Foucault. It is allied with Foucault's concept of "environmentalism." Massumi analyzes "onto power" as entwined with neoliberal capitalism. He argues that this entwinement makes the capitalist economy a direct power formation in its own right.

The idea that capitalist ontopower is a direct power formation that modulates the social field of emergence to capture becoming raises fundamental questions about what form political resistance and anticapitalist struggle can take. Massumi argues that there is no position "outside" capitalist power from which to critique or resist. The potential for political action nonetheless remains, but requires strategies of "immanent critique" that counter-modulate the social field of emergence. These forms of resistance occur at the "micropolitical" level. The word micropolitics does not refer to the scale at which action takes place, but rather to its mode.

=== Philosophy of experience ===
Massumi's approach to perception and the philosophy of experience is closely tied to his political philosophy through the theory of affect. Massumi famously distinguishes emotion from affect. Following Spinoza, he defines affect as "the capacity to affect and be affected." This locates affect in encounters in the world, rather than the interiority of a psychological subject. Emotion, he argues, is the interiorization of affect toward psychological expression. He locates affect as such in a nonconscious "zone of indistinction" or "zone of indeterminacy" between thought and action. This zone of indeterminacy is the "field of emergence" of determinate experience, but itself resists capture in functional systems or structures of meaning.

Affect's resistance to capture leaves a "remainder" of unactualized capacity that continues in the world as a "reserve" of potential available for the next determination, or "taking-form" of experience in definitive action, perception and emotion. Massumi refers to this remaindering of potential across an ongoing process of serial formation as the "autonomy" of affect

Affect is implicated in all modes of experience, including language experience, as an accompanying dimension of becoming. The process of the taking-form of experience is "pulsed." Each definitive taking-form reemerges from the field of emergence after a lapse that Massumi identifies with the "missing half-second" in conscious experience experimentally verified by neuropsychologist Benjamin Libet. Quoting Whitehead, he maintains that "consciousness flickers" Between pulses, experience returns to immanence in the zone of indistinction of the field of emergence, where it is "primed" (energized and oriented) for a next taking-form. This occurs at the nonconscious level of "intensity" of experience.

Massumi argues affect plays a role in politics because it shapes how people respond collectively before rational decision-making. Affect can mobilize crowds or create atmospheres of fear, joy, or unrest.

In his later work, Massumi develops the concept of "bare activity" to aid in the analysis of the affective field of emergence in which modes of activity that divergently express, for example as "mental" versus "physical,""action" versus "perception," or "rational" versus "emotional," are in what he calls a state of "mutual inclusion." (for which "co-motion," "superposition," and "reciprocal presupposition" are synonyms in Massumi's vocabulary). Mutual inclusion is the logic of immanence, which does not obey the law of the excluded middle.

The concept of mutual inclusion in bare activity has consequences for the theory of perception. It focuses the theory of perception on the interfusion of the senses (cross-modal relay or synesthesia) and "amodal perception" (experience that is not in any particular sense mode and is in that sense "abstract"). Massumi ties amodal perception to the "proprioceptive" experience of movement perception, and argues that the experience of movement is primarily in relation to objects.

Massumi's emphasis on amodal perception gives modes of abstraction ("nonsensuous perception") a direct role in the emergence of experience. This troubles the distinction between the concrete and the abstract. Massumi analyzes the constitutive role of abstract dimensions of reality in terms of the "reality of the virtual," expanding on Bergson's theory of the virtual as reinterpreted by Deleuze. He argues that the virtual, paradoxically, is itself actualized, in the form of a supplement of experience that he calls a "semblance." A semblance in Massumi's vocabulary is the direct experience of the abstract "dynamic form" of an event. It carries a sense of vitality ("vitality affect") uniquely associated with the event. This supplementation of sensuous experience constitutes a "surplus value of life."

Massumi's theories reject representational accounts of thought and perception, as well as any mind/body dualism. The latter is replaced by the integral event of "bodying," coinciding with the "movement of thought." His emphasis on the nonconsciousness of the field of experience challenges the model of cognition in favor of a theory of "direct perception." Direct perception, in his account, is performative and emergent. It expresses and transmits affective powers that exceed cognitive apprehension. Direct perception, or "pure" experience, is nevertheless addressable in a mode of awareness Massumi calls "thinking-feeling" (an embodied "affective attunement" to relation and potential that he glosses in terms of Peirce's logical category of abduction).

Massumi argues that affect and direct perception are not confined to a human subject, but are "transindividual" and spread across the "nature–culture continuum." This qualifies his thought as a variety of panexperientialism, and distances it from phenomenology. In this connection, he has characterized his thought as an "extreme realism," by which he means a philosophy asserting the ultimate reality of qualities of experience, conceived as irreducible to either subjective qualia or objective properties, and as defying quantification.

=== Creativity ===
Massumi works from Whitehead's notion of "creative advance," according to which the world is in a perpetual state of emergence characterized by the continual variation of form. The speculative and pragmatic aspects of his thought come together around the notion that specific practices can be developed to further this creative movement.

In collaboration with Erin Manning, Massumi has developed a process-philosophical take on research creation. Research creation is a category in Canadian academia akin to what is called "art-based research" in Europe. Manning and Massumi extend the concept beyond the university and the specific domain of art. They advocate for an "ecology of practices" that explores how philosophical concepts formed in language can be "transduced" into other modes of experience in a way that furthers creative practice, and reciprocally, how the understanding that already imbues non-language based modes of experience can be brought to explicit expression in ways that further conceptual research. Through this two-way exchange, they see the potential to foster the emergence of new, nonstandard modes of knowledge that exceed disciplinary understanding and normative frames of perception. This affirmation of "minor" modes of thought and experience allies Manning and Massumi's vision of research-creation to the neurodiversity movement.

As Manning and Massumi understand it, the practice of research-creation is necessarily collective and relational, and thus carries a "proto-political" force of immanent critique. Manning's SenseLab is conceived as a laboratory for the collaborative exploration of research creation in its philosophical, aesthetic and political dimensions.

== Criticism ==
Most critical responses to Massumi's work focus on the 1995 essay "The Autonomy of Affect" and categorize him as an "affect theorist." The distinction he makes between affect and emotion, and his assertion that affect is "autonomous" in the sense that it extends beyond linguistic signification and resists cultural coding, are particular subjects of contention.

In an influential essay, Ruth Leys asserts that Massumi establishes a "false dichotomy" between mind and matter, and thinking and feeling, and disqualifies the first term of each couple. This separates the body from subjectivity, and plays into scientistic frameworks assimilating the body to inert matter. Leys argues that this undermines intentionality and rationality, which in turn makes it impossible to account for ideology or to programmatically resist it. Leys further argues that Massumi's account of the "missing half-second" negates free will.

Margaret Wetherell argues that Massumi draws too gross a demarcation between bodily experience and social action and establishes a starkly polarized distinction between controlled and autonomic processes. In Wetherell's opinion, Massumi detours the study of affect and emotion toward particular philosophical preoccupations in ways that are "radically unhelpful" and undermine a more judicious and "pragmatic" approach grounded in the social psychology literature.

Eugenie Brinkema, writing from a film theory perspective, similarly criticizes what she sees as Massumi's overreliance on the line of philosophical thinking about affect descending from Spinoza through Deleuze. She sees Massumi imposing a "split" between affect and emotion that cuts affect off from signification, leaving it merely "formless" and "outside structure."

His work on theory of affect has been influential in film studies, while most notable polemics include Sven Lütticken and Hito Steyerl.

== Works as author ==
- A User's Guide to Capitalism and Schizophrenia: Deviations from Deleuze and Guattari (MIT Press, 1992) (ISBN 0-262-63143-1)
- First and Last Emperors: The Absolute State and the Body of the Despot (with Kenneth Dean; Autonomedia, 1993) (ISBN 0-936756-77-2)
- Parables for the Virtual: Movement, Affect, Sensation (Duke University Press, 2002) (ISBN 0-8223-2897-6)
- Semblance and Event: Activist Philosophy and the Occurrent Arts (MIT Press, 2011) (ISBN 0-262-13491-8)
- Thought in the Act: Passages in the Ecology of Experience (with Erin Manning; University of Minnesota Press, 2014) (ISBN 0-8166-7967-3)
- What Animals Teach Us about Politics (Duke University Press, 2014) (ISBN 978-0-8223-5800-8)
- The Power at the End of the Economy (Duke University Press, 2015) (ISBN 978-0-8223-5838-1)
- Politics of Affect (Polity Press, 2015) (ISBN 978-0-7456-8981-4)
- Ontopower: War, Powers, and the State of Perception (Duke University Press, 2015) (ISBN 978-0-8223-5995-1)
- The Principle of Unrest: Activist Philosophy in the Expanded Field (Open Humanities Press, 2017) (ISBN 978-1-7854-2044-3)
- 99 Theses on the Revaluation of Value: A Postcapitalist Manifesto (Minneapolis: University of Minnesota Press, 2018) (ISBN 978-1-5179-0587-3)Online project.
- Architectures of the Unforeseen: Essays in the Occurrent Arts (Minneapolis: University of Minnesota Press, 2019) (ISBN 978-1-5179-0596-5)
- Couplets: Travels in Speculative Pragmatism (Duke University Press, 2021) (ISBN 978-1-4780-1466-9)
- Parables for the Virtual: Movement, Affect, Sensation. Augmented twentieth anniversary edition. (Duke University Press, 2021) (ISBN 978-1-4780-1467-6)
- The Personality of Power: A Theory of Fascism for Anti-fascist Life (Duke University Press, 2025) (ISBN 978-1-4780-3159-8)
- Toward a Theory of Fascism for Anti-fascist Life: A Process Vocabulary (Minor Compositions, 2025) (ISBN 978-1-5702-7438-1)

== Work as editor ==
- Theory Out of Bounds University of Minnesota Press book series, 1993–2007. Co-edited with Michael Hardt and Sandra Buckley.
- The Politics of Everyday Fear (University of Minnesota Press, 1993) (ISBN 0816621632)
- A Shock to Thought: Expression After Deleuze and Guattari (Routledge, 2002) (ISBN 0415238048)
- Technologies of Lived Abstraction MIT Press book series, 2009–2017. Co-edited with Erin Manning.
- Thought in the Act Duke University Press book series, begun 2017. Co-edited with Erin Manning.
- Immediations Open Humanities Press book series, 2015–2018. Edited by SenseLab.
- Immediations (continuation) Punctum Books book series, begun 2018. Edited by SenseLab.
- Animals, Animality and Literature , Cambridge Critical Concepts, ed. Bruce Boehrer, Molly Hand, and Brian Massumi (Cambridge University Press, 2018) (ISBN 978-1108429825)

== Works as translator ==
- The Postmodern Condition, Jean-François Lyotard, tr. Brian Massumi and Geoff Bennington (Minneapolis: University of Minnesota Press, 1984). (ISBN 978-0-8166-1173-7)
- Noise: The Political Economy of Music, Jacques Attali (Minneapolis: University of Minnesota Press, 1985). ISBN 978-0-8166-1287-1)
- Nomadology: The War Machine, Gilles Deleuze and Félix Guattari (New York: Semiotext(e), 1986). (ISBN 978-0936756097)
- Heterologies: Discourse on the Other, Michel de Certeau (Minneapolis: University of Minnesota Press, 1986). (ISBN 978-0-8166-1404-2)
- A Thousand Plateaus: Capitalism and Schizophrenia, Gilles Deleuze and Félix Guattari (University of Minnesota Press, 1987). (ISBN 978-0-8166-1402-8)
