= Erin Manning =

Canadian cultural theorist and philosopher

- Born: 1 February 1969 (age 57)

Philosophical work
- Era: 20th-/21st-century philosophy
- Region: Western philosophy
- School: Process philosophy, radical empiricism
- Main interests: Political philosophy

Erin Manning (born 1969) is a Canadian cultural theorist and political philosopher as well as a practicing artist in the areas of dance, fabric design, and interactive installation. Manning's research spans the fields of art, political theory, and philosophy. She received her Ph.D. in political philosophy from University of Hawaii in 2000. She currently teaches in the Concordia University Fine Arts Faculty.

== Work ==
Manning is founder and director of the SenseLab, a research-creation laboratory affiliated with Hexagram: Institute for Research/Creation in Media Arts and Technology in Montreal. She collaborates with Brian Massumi. They co-edit a book series at MIT Press entitled Technologies of Lived Abstraction and are founding members of the editorial collective of the Sense Lab journal Inflexions: A Journal of Research Creation.

Manning frequently gives workshops and lectures at universities and other institutions, including but not limited to the Zürcher Hochschule der Künste (Zurich University of the Arts) (with Brian Massumi), the European Graduate School in Saas-Fee, the Dance Bar (International Dance Programme) in Sweden, and the University of California at Berkeley.

== Bibliography ==
- Ephemeral Territories: Representing Nation, Home, and Identity in Canada (University of Minnesota Press, 2003) (ISBN 0816639256)
- Politics of Touch: Sense, Movement, Sovereignty (University of Minnesota Press, 2007) (ISBN 0816648441)
- Relationscapes: Movement, Art, Philosophy (MIT Press, 2009) (ISBN 978-0-262-13490-3)
- Always More Than One: Individuation's Dance (Duke University Press, 2013) (ISBN 978-0-8223-5334-8)
- Thought in the Act: Passages in the Ecology of Experience (with Brian Massumi; University of Minnesota Press, 2014) (ISBN 0816679673)
- The Minor Gesture (Duke University Press, 2016) (ISBN 978-0-8223-7441-1)
