= Dialogues (Deleuze book) =

1977 book by Gilles Deleuze

- Cover of the first edition
- Authors: Gilles Deleuze; Claire Parnet
- Original title: Dialogues
- Translator: Hugh Tomlinson and Barbara Habberjam
- Language: French
- Subject: Philosophy
- Published: 1977 (Flammarion, in French); 1987 (The Athlone Press, in English)
- Publication place: France
- Pages: 176 (Columbia University Press edition, 2007)
- ISBN: 978-0231141352

Dialogues (French: Dialogues) is a 1977 book in which Gilles Deleuze examines his philosophical pluralism in a series of discussions with Claire Parnet. It is widely read as an accessible and personable introduction to Deleuze's philosophy along with Negotiations. The book contains an exposition of Deleuze's concepts and methodologies in which he thinks of newer ways to liberate life.

The book has been translated into English by Hugh Tomlinson and Barbara Habberjam.

The Continuum and Columbia University Press editions have the brief essay "The Actual and the Virtual" in which Deleuze outlines an ontology of the virtual.

== Editions ==
- Deleuze, Gilles and Claire Parnet (2007). Dialogues. New York: Columbia University Press
