= Spinoza: Practical Philosophy =

1970 book by Gilles Deleuze

- Cover of the second edition
- Author: Gilles Deleuze
- Original title: Spinoza: Philosophie pratique
- Translator: Robert Hurley
- Language: French
- Subject: Baruch Spinoza
- Publisher: Presses Universitaires de France, City Lights Books
- Publication date: 1970
- Publication place: France
- English publication date: 1988
- Media type: Print (Hardback and Paperback)
- Pages: 130 (City Lights edition)
- ISBN: 978-0872862180

Spinoza: Practical Philosophy (French: Spinoza: Philosophie pratique; 1970; second edition 1981) is a book written by French philosopher Gilles Deleuze which examines Baruch Spinoza's philosophy, discussing Ethics (1677) and other works such as the Tractatus Theologico-Politicus (1670), providing a lengthy chapter defining Spinoza's main concepts in dictionary form. Deleuze relates Spinoza's ethical philosophy to the writings of Friedrich Nietzsche and Willem van Blijenbergh, a grain broker who corresponded with Spinoza in the first half of 1665 and questioned the ethics of his concept of evil.

== Summary ==
Deleuze discusses Spinoza's philosophy, providing a chapter defining Spinoza's main concepts in dictionary form. He relates Spinoza's ethical philosophy to the writings of Nietzsche, citing On the Genealogy of Morals (1887) and an 1881 letter to the theologian Franz Overbeck, and Blijenbergh, a grain broker who corresponded with Spinoza in the first half of 1665 and questioned the ethics of his concept of evil. Deleuze observes that Spinoza's letters to Blijenbergh are the only place in his work where he "considers the problem of evil per se", making them of unique importance, and records Spinoza's developing frustration with Blijenbergh. Explaining Spinoza's use of the body as a model for philosophers, Deleuze writes that, "When a body 'encounters' another body, or an idea another idea, it happens that the two relations sometimes combine to form a more powerful whole, and sometimes one decomposes the other, destroying the cohesion of its parts...we experience joy when a body encounters ours and enters into composition with it, and sadness when, on the contrary, a body or an idea threatens our own coherence."

According to Deleuze, Spinoza sees consciousness as "transitive": "Consciousness is the passage, or rather the awareness of the passage from these less potent totalities to the more potent ones, and vice versa." Consciousness "is not a property of the Whole...it has only an informational value, and what is more, the information is necessarily confused and distorted." To show how decomposition works, Deleuze uses Spinoza's example from the Hebrew Bible: the forbidden fruit that Adam eats in the Garden of Eden.

When Adam hears God's command not to eat the forbidden fruit, he understands it as a prohibition. Deleuze notes that God's command refers to a fruit that will poison Adam if he eats it, which he describes as "an instance of an encounter between two bodies whose characteristic relations are not compatible...the fruit will determine the parts of Adam's body to enter into new relations that no longer accord with his own essence." Deleuze writes that, "...because Adam is ignorant of causes, he thinks that God morally forbids him something, whereas God only reveals the natural consequence of ingesting the fruit." He explains that Spinoza believes that everything defined as "evil" is of this type: "bad encounters, poisoning, intoxication, relational decomposition."

Spinoza thus replaces morality, which in Deleuze's words "always refers existence to transcendent values" and which represents God's judgment, with ethics, "a typology of immanent modes of existence". The opposition between good and evil is replaced by "the qualitative differences of modes of existence", an opposition between what is good and what is simply bad. In Spinoza's account, as described by Deleuze, "consciousness misapprehends all of Nature", and "...all one needs in order to moralize is to fail to understand." Misunderstanding a law makes it appear in the form of a moral 'You must.'" The domain of the eternal truths of nature and that of the moral laws of institutions can be separated through considering their effects. Deleuze writes that, "Law, whether moral or ethical, does not provide us with any knowledge; it makes nothing known. At worst it prevents the formation of knowledge (the law of the tyrant). At best, it prepares for knowledge and makes it possible (the law of Abraham or of Christ)." He believes that ontology has historically been compromised by an error "whereby the command is mistaken for something to be understood, obedience for knowledge itself, and Being for Fiat."

== Publication history ==
Spinoza: Practical Philosophy was first published in 1970 by Presses Universitaires de France. In 1981, a revised and expanded edition was published by Les Éditions de Minuit. In 1988, the book was published in Robert Hurley's English translation by City Lights Books.

== Reception ==
Hurley credited Deleuze with making clear the kinship of Spinoza and Nietzsche. Observing that reading Spinoza is difficult, Hurley wrote that, "...the situation is helped by the author's word to the wise: one doesn't have to follow every proposition, make every connection — the intuitive or affective reading may be more practical anyway." Hurley suggested that Spinoza should be read like poetry. The philosopher Pierre-François Moreau wrote that Deleuze sees in Spinozism a philosophy of power. The neuroscientist Antonio Damasio suggested that Deleuze provided a reading of Spinoza's thinking compatible with the view that the mind arises from the body. The philosopher Alan D. Schrift wrote that, together with Deleuze's Expressionism in Philosophy: Spinoza (1968), Spinoza: Practical Philosophy "influenced several generations of French Spinozism".

== See also ==
- Plane of immanence
