= Georges Canguilhem =

French philosopher (1904–1995)

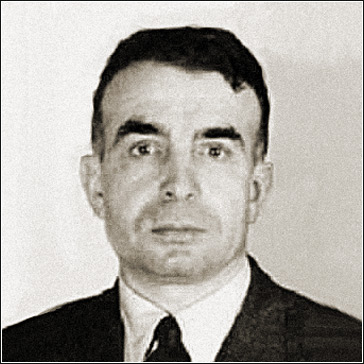
- Born: 4 June 1904; Castelnaudary, Aude, France
- Died: 11 September 1995 (aged 91); Marly-le-Roi, Île-de-France, France
- Other name: "Lafont"
- Political party: CVIA

Education
- Education: École Normale Supérieure
- Academic advisor: Alain

Philosophical work
- Era: 20th-century philosophy
- Region: Western philosophy
- School: Continental philosophy French historical epistemology Anti-positivism
- Institutions: École Normale Supérieure
- Doctoral students: Michel Foucault, Gilbert Simondon
- Notable students: Alain Badiou, Pierre Bourdieu, François Dagognet, Gilles Deleuze
- Main interests: History and philosophy of science, historical epistemology, philosophy of biology, philosophy of medicine
- Notable ideas: Revival of vitalism, dispositif

Georges Canguilhem (/kɑːŋɡɪˈlɛm/; French: [kɑ̃ɡilɛm]; 4 June 1904 – 11 September 1995) was a French philosopher and physician who specialized in epistemology and the philosophy of science, particularly the philosophy of biology.

== Life and work ==
Canguilhem entered the École Normale Supérieure in 1924 as part of a class that included Jean-Paul Sartre, Raymond Aron and Paul Nizan. He aggregated in 1927 and then taught in lycées throughout France, taking up the study of medicine while teaching in Toulouse.

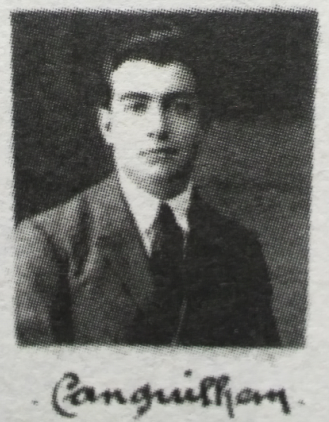
Canguilhem during his student years

He took up a post at the Clermont-Ferrand based University of Strasbourg in 1941, and received his medical doctorate in 1943, in the middle of World War II. Using the pseudonym "Lafont", Canguilhem became active in the French Resistance, serving as a doctor in Auvergne.

By 1948 he was the French equivalent of department chair in philosophy at Strasbourg as well. Seven years later, he was named a professor at the Sorbonne and succeeded Gaston Bachelard as the director of the Institut d'histoire des sciences, a post he occupied until 1971, at which time he undertook an active emeritus career.

In 1983 he was awarded the Sarton Medal by the History of Science Society. In 1987 he received the médaille d'or, awarded by the Centre national de la recherche scientifique (CNRS).

=== Philosophy of biology ===
Canguilhem's principal work in philosophy of science is presented in two books, Le Normal et le pathologique, first published in 1943 and then expanded in 1968, and La Connaissance de la vie (1952). Le Normal et le pathologique is an extended exploration into the nature and meaning of normality in medicine and biology, the production and institutionalization of medical knowledge. It is still a seminal work in medical anthropology and the history of ideas, and is widely influential in part thanks to Canguilhem's influence on Michel Foucault. La Connaissance de la vie is an extended study of the specificity of biology as a science, the historical and conceptual significance of vitalism, and the possibility of conceiving organisms not on the basis of mechanical and technical models that would reduce the organism to a machine, but rather on the basis of the organism's relation to the milieu in which it lives, its successful survival in this milieu, and its status as something greater than "the sum of its parts". Canguilhem argued strongly for these positions, criticising 18th and 19th century vitalism (and its politics) but also cautioning against the reduction of biology to a "physical science." He believed such a reduction deprived biology of a proper field of study, ideologically transforming living beings into mechanical structures serving a chemical/physical equilibrium that cannot account for the particularity of organisms or for the complexity of life. He furthered and altered these critiques in a later book, Ideology and Rationality in the History of the Life Sciences.

Canguilhem was originally hostile to the ideas of Henri Bergson and vitalism but was later influenced by them and developed his own "idiosyncratic brand of vitalism."

More specifically, Canguilhem’s take on vitalism was influenced in the early stages of his career by his non-dogmatic reading of Karl Marx. Prinz and Schmidgen argue that Canguilhem was the key representative of an "undercurrent of European philosophy" they call "Vitalist Marxism," designating "a theoretical position that not only recognizes ‘life’ as an essential foundation of the production process in modern societies, but also considers it a critical resource for resistance to the capitalist logic of exploitation".

In fact, Canguilhem’s above-mentioned concepts – most importantly the irreducibility of the organism to the machine and the relation between the organism and the milieu – can be traced back to his early engagement with Marx’s notion of labor mediating between men and nature as well as Marx’s critical analysis of the corrupted shape this mediation takes under the regime of factory production.

More than just a great theoretician, Canguilhem was one of the few philosophers of the 20th century to develop an approach that was shaped by a medical education. He helped define a method of studying the history of science which was practical and rigorous. His work focused on the one hand on the concepts of "normal" and "pathological" and, on the other, a critical history of the formation of concepts such as "reflex" in the history of science. Canguilhem was also a mentor to several French scholars, most notably Foucault, for whom he served as a sponsor in the presentation of Histoire de la folie à l'âge classique (History of Madness) for the Doctorat d'État and whose work he followed throughout the latter's life.

=== Institutional role ===
As Inspector General and then president of the jury d'Agrégation in philosophy, Canguilhem had a tremendous and direct influence over philosophical instruction in France in the latter half of the twentieth century and was known to more than a generation of French academic philosophers as a demanding and exacting evaluator who, as Louis Althusser remarked, believed he could correct the philosophical understanding of teachers by bawling them out. This belief did not prevent him from being regarded with considerable affection by the generation of intellectuals that came to the fore in the 1960s, including Jacques Derrida, Michel Foucault, Louis Althusser, and Jacques Lacan. Althusser once wrote to his English translator that "my debt to Canguilhem is incalculable" (italics in the original, from Economy and Society 27, page 171). Likewise, Foucault, in his introduction to Canguilhem's The Normal and the Pathological, wrote:

Take away Canguilhem and you will no longer understand much about Althusser, Althusserism and a whole series of discussions which have taken place among French Marxists; you will no longer grasp what is specific to sociologists such as Bourdieu, Castel, Passeron and what marks them so strongly within sociology; you will miss an entire aspect of the theoretical work done by psychoanalysts, particularly by the followers of Lacan. Further, in the entire discussion of ideas which preceded or followed the movement of '68, it is easy to find the place of those who, from near or from afar, had been trained by Canguilhem.

Derrida recalled that Canguilhem advised him early in his career that he would have to distinguish himself as a serious scholar before he could exhibit professionally the particular philosophical sense of humour for which he is at turns famous and notorious, advice which Derrida seemed to have taken in earnest.

After years of neglect, a great deal of Canguilhem's writings have been translated into English. Among them are his celebrated works The Normal and the Pathological and Knowledge of Life as well as two collections of essays, titled A Vital Rationalist and Writings on Medicine.

== Bibliography ==
- Essai sur quelques problèmes concernant le normal et le pathologique (1943), re-published with the title Le normal et le pathologique, augmenté de Nouvelles réflexions concernant le normal et le pathologique (1966).
- La connaissance de la vie (1952).
- La formation du concept de réflexe aux XVIIe et XVIIIe siècles (1955).
- Du développement à l’évolution au XIXe siècle (1962).
- Etudes d’histoire et de philosophie des sciences (1968).
- Vie et Régulation, articles contributed to Encyclopaedia Universalis (1974).
- Idéologie et rationalité dans l’histoire des sciences de la vie (1977).
- La santé, concept vulgaire et question philosophique (1988).
- Vie et mort de Jean Cavaillès.

Translations into English

- Ideology and Rationality in the History of the Life Sciences, trans. Arthur Goldhammer (Cambridge: MIT Press, 1988).
- The Normal and the Pathological, trans. Carolyn R. Fawcett & Robert S. Cohen (New York: Zone Books, 1991).
- Machine and Organism, trans. Mark Cohen & Randall Cherry, in "Incorporations" Ed. by Jonathan Crary and Sanford Kwinter (New York: Zone Books, 1992).
- A Vital Rationalist: Selected Writings, trans. Arthur Goldhammer (New York: Zone Books, 1994).
- Knowledge of Life, trans. Stefanos Geroulanos and Daniela Ginsburg (New York: Fordham UP, 2008).
- Writings on Medicine, trans. Stefanos Geroulanos and Todd Meyers (New York: Fordham UP, 2012).
- The formation of the concept of reflex in the XVIIth and XVIIIth centuries (2024).
- Life and Death of Jean Cavaillès (2024).
