= Claire Parnet =

French journalist

Claire Parnet (French: [paʁnɛ]; born 1953) is a French journalist.

She is famous for having co-written with Gilles Deleuze (her former teacher) the book Dialogues (1977). It is a book of exchanges, interspersed with questions, where each author responds by contributing a block of text.

Eleven years later, Parnet renewed this experience by doing a television programme with Deleuze called L'Abécédaire de Gilles Deleuze (The ABCs of Gilles Deleuze) where she asked the philosopher to speak on twenty-five themes presented in alphabetical order.

In the 1980s she was the editor of the journal L'Autre. Later she served as curator of television cultural shows like L'Hebdo of Michel Field and L'Appartement (with Ariel Wizman) broadcast on Canal+.

She has also been editorial adviser for literary programs of the French television network France 5.
