= The Logic of Sense =

1969 book by Gilles Deleuze

- Cover of the French edition
- Author: Gilles Deleuze
- Original title: Logique du sens
- Translators: Mark Lester, Charles Stivale
- Language: French
- Series: European Perspectives
- Subject: Meaning
- Published: 1969 (Les Éditions de Minuit, in French); 1990 (Columbia University Press, in English)
- Publication place: France
- Media type: Print (hardcover and paperback)
- Pages: 392 (French edition); 393 (Columbia University Press edition)
- ISBN: 978-0231059831

The Logic of Sense (French: Logique du sens) is a 1969 book by the French philosopher Gilles Deleuze. The English edition was translated by Mark Lester and Charles Stivale, and edited by Constantin V. Boundas.

== Summary ==
An exploration of meaning and meaninglessness or "commonsense" and "nonsense" through metaphysics, epistemology, grammar, and eventually psychoanalysis, The Logic of Sense consists of a series of thirty-four paradoxes followed by an appendix that contains five previously published essays, including a brief overview of Deleuze's ontology entitled "Plato and the Simulacrum". The Deleuzian understanding of nonsense considers that there is a "surface level" of nonsense which creates innocent, childlike preoccupations with contradictions (represented by Lewis Carroll), and the inner space of nonsense which deals with strong and violent contradictions (represented by Antonin Artaud). Leading on from Deleuze's ontology in his 1968 book Difference and Repetition, sense can only itself be understood as a constant set of correlations and associations. Nonsense, especially through the literature he analyzes, intrinsically avoids being defined, and can only be seen as "that which has no sense," but "is opposed to the absence of sense".

The book introduces Deleuze's philosophy of the event and of becoming as well as the emergence of the plane of immanence and the body without organs, mythic conceptions of time (Chronos and Aion), the structure of games, and textual analyses of works by Lewis Carroll, Seneca, Pierre Klossowski, Michel Tournier, Antonin Artaud, F. Scott Fitzgerald, Melanie Klein, Friedrich Nietzsche, Stéphane Mallarmé, Malcolm Lowry, Émile Zola and Sigmund Freud.

== Reception ==
The philosopher Michel Foucault wrote that The Logic of Sense "should be read as the boldest and most insolent of metaphysical treatises – on the simple condition that instead of denouncing metaphysics as the neglect of being, we force it to speak of extrabeing". The philosopher Christopher Norris believes that, like Difference and Repetition (1968), The Logic of Sense comes as near as possible to offering a full-scale programmatic statement of Deleuze's post-philosophical, anti-systematic, ultra-nominalist or resolutely "non-totalizing" mode of thought.

The physicists Alan Sokal and Jean Bricmont write in Fashionable Nonsense (1997) that The Logic of Sense prefigures the style of works that Deleuze later wrote in collaboration with Félix Guattari, and that, like them, it contains passages in which Deleuze misuses technical scientific terms. Timothy Laurie argues that Deleuze presents "sense" as wrapped up in a problematic, and that a problematic cannot be evaluated according to truth and error, nor is it ever exhausted through one single solution.
