= Jussi Backman =

Finnish philosopher

Education
- Education: University of Helsinki (PhD) · Université de Nice – Sophia Antipolis (DEA)

Philosophical work
- Era: Contemporary philosophy
- Region: Western philosophy
- Institutions: University of Helsinki
- Main interests: History of philosophy, conceptual history, metaphysics, ontology, political theory, phenomenology, philosophical hermeneutics, philosophy of religion, philosophy of art
- Website: https://helsinki.academia.edu/JussiBackman

Jussi Backman is a Finnish philosopher and Senior Research Fellow at the Faculty of Theology, University of Helsinki. His work spans twentieth-century philosophy (especially the work of Martin Heidegger and Hannah Arendt), the history of philosophy (especially the Presocratics and Aristotle), metaphysics, phenomenology, philosophical hermeneutics, poststructuralism, and the conceptual history of politics and life.

Backman completed a DEA (Diplôme d'études approfondies) degree at Université Nice—Sophia Antipolis in 2003 and a Ph.D. in theoretical philosophy at the University of Helsinki in 2010 with a dissertation on Heidegger and Parmenides. Since 2013, he holds the title of Docent in theoretical philosophy at the University of Helsinki and the title of Docent in philosophy at the University of Jyväskylä. He has worked as Postdoctoral Research Fellow at the University of Helsinki (2010–2012), as Senior Lecturer and Academy of Finland Research Fellow at the University of Jyväskylä (2012–2023), and as Senior Research Fellow at the Tampere Institute for Advanced Study, Tampere University (2023–2026).

Since 2023, Backman is a member of the executive committee of the Nordic Society for Phenomenology.

== Books and edited volumes ==
- Complicated Presence: Heidegger and the Postmetaphysical Unity of Being (State University of New York Press, 2015)
- Omaisuus ja elämä: Heidegger ja Aristoteles kreikkalaisen ontologian rajalla (Eurooppalaisen filosofian seura, 2005)
- Biopolitics and Ancient Thought (edited with Antonio Cimino; Oxford University Press, 2022)
- Conservative Dispositions in Continental Thought (Research topic, Frontiers in Political Science, edited with Pedro T. Magalhães, 2022)
- Thinking Contemporary Art with Heidegger (Special issue of Journal of Aesthetics and Phenomenology, edited with Harri Mäcklin and Raine Vasquez, 2017)
- Heidegger: Ajattelun aiheita (edited with Miika Luoto; Eurooppalaisen filosofian seura, 2006)
