= Affect (philosophy) =

Philosophy concept by Baruch Spinoza

Affect (from Latin affectus or adfectus) is a concept, used in the philosophy of Baruch Spinoza and elaborated by Henri Bergson, Gilles Deleuze and Félix Guattari, that places emphasis on bodily or embodied experience. The word affect takes on a different meaning in psychology and other fields.

For Spinoza, as discussed in Parts Two and Three of his Ethics, affects are states of mind and body that are related to (but not exactly synonymous with) feelings and emotions, of which he says there are three primary kinds: pleasure or joy (laetitia), pain or sorrow (tristitia) and desire (cupiditas) or appetite. Subsequent philosophical usage by Gilles Deleuze, Félix Guattari and their translator Brian Massumi, while derived explicitly from Spinoza, tends to distinguish more sharply than Spinoza does between affect and what are conventionally called emotions. Affects are difficult to grasp and conceptualize because, as Spinoza says, "an affect or passion of the mind [animi pathema] is a confused idea" which is only perceived by the increase or decrease it causes in the body's vital force. The term "affect" is central to what has become known as the "affective turn" in the humanities and social sciences.

== In Spinoza ==
In Baruch Spinoza's Ethics, Part III Definition 3, the term "affect" (affectus, traditionally translated as "emotion") is the modification or variation produced in a body (including the mind) by an interaction with another body which increases or diminishes the body's power of activity (potentia agendi):

By affect I understand affections of the body by which the body's power of acting is increased or diminished, aided or restrained, and at the same time, the ideas of these affections.

Affect is thus a special case of the more neutral term "affection" (affectio), which designates the form "taken on" by some thing, the mode, state or quality of a body's relation to the world or nature (or infinite "substance"). In Part III, "Definitions of the Emotions/Affects", Spinoza defines 48 different forms of affect, including love and hatred, hope and fear, envy and compassion. They are nearly all manifestations of the three basic affects of:

- desire (cupiditas) or appetite (appetitus), defined as "the very essence of man insofar as his essence is conceived as determined to any action from any given affection of itself";
- pleasure (laetitia), defined as "man's transition from a state of less perfection to a state of greater perfection"; and
- pain or sorrow (tristitia), defined as "man's transition from a state of greater perfection to a state of less perfection".

In Spinoza's view, since God's power of activity is infinite, any affection which increases the organism's power of activity leads to greater perfection. Affects are transitional states or modes in that they are vital forces by which the organism strives to act against other forces which act on it and continually resist it or hold it in check.

== In Bergson ==
Henri Bergson contends in Matter and Memory (1896) that we do not know our body only "from without" by perceptions, but also "from within" by affections (French: affections).

== In Deleuze and Guattari ==
The terms "affect" and "affection" came to prominence in Gilles Deleuze and Félix Guattari's A Thousand Plateaus, the second volume of Capitalism and Schizophrenia. In his notes on the terminology employed, the translator Brian Massumi gives the following definitions of the terms as used in the volume:

AFFECT/AFFECTION. Neither word denotes a personal feeling (sentiment in Deleuze and Guattari). L'affect (Spinoza's affectus) is an ability to affect and be affected. It is a prepersonal intensity corresponding to the passage from one experiential state of the body to another and implying an augmentation or diminution in that body's capacity to act. L'affection (Spinoza's affectio) is each such state considered as an encounter between the affected body and a second, affecting, body (with body taken in its broadest possible sense to include "mental" or ideal bodies).

Deleuze takes up the term affect from Spinoza and transforms it to meet the central ethical and political problem he poses. Fundamentally, Deleuze uses the term "affect" in two ways: affect as becoming and affect as capacities. Affect as capacities corresponds to Spinoza's notion of affection, which designates a being's capacities to affect other beings and be affected by them. In A Thousand Plateaus, Deleuze and Guattari, famously argue that a tick has three affects: (1) a capacity to be affected by light, which drives the tick to climb onto a branch, (2) a capacity to be affected by the smell of mammals, which prompts the tick to drop onto a passing host, (3) and lastly a capacity to dig into the animal's skin. The use of affects as becomings delineates affects as drivers of "events or undergoings that have disruptive and creative effects both on an individual’s internal composition and its external relationships with other things." One of the main results of viewing affects as becomings is that they are no longer seen as merely personal feelings, as "they go beyond the strength of those who undergo them" In this respect, affects, according to Deleuze, are not simple affections, as they are independent from their subject. Artists create affects and percepts, "blocks of space-time", whereas science works with functions, according to Deleuze, and philosophy creates concepts.

== Affective turn ==
Since 1995, a number of authors in the social sciences and humanities have begun to explore affect theory as a way of understanding spheres of experience (including bodily experience) which fall outside of the dominant paradigm of representation (based on rhetoric and semiotics); this movement has been called the affective turn. Consequently, these approaches are interested in the widest possible variety of interactions and encounters, interactions and encounters that are not necessarily limited to human sensibility. The translator of Deleuze and Guattari's A Thousand Plateaus, Canadian political philosopher Brian Massumi, has given influential definitions of affect (see above) and has written on the neglected importance of movement and sensation in cultural formations and our interaction with real and virtual worlds. Likewise, geographer Nigel Thrift has explored the role of affect in what he terms "non-representational theory". In 2010, The Affect Theory Reader was published by Melissa Gregg and Gregory J. Seigworth and has provided the first compendium of affect theory writings. Researchers such as Mog Stapleton, Daniel D. Hutto and Peter Carruthers have pointed to the need to investigate and to develop the notions of affect and emotion. They hold that these are important in the developing paradigm of embodiment in cognitive science, in consciousness studies and the philosophy of mind. This step will be necessary for cognitive science, Mog Stapleton maintains, to be "properly embodied" cognitive science.

== See also ==
- Affect theory
- Affectionism
- Conatus
- Immanent evaluation
- Passions

== Sources ==
- Deleuze, Gilles. 1983. Cinema 1: The Movement Image. Trans. Hugh Tomlinson and Barbara Habberjam. London and New York: Continuum, 2005. ISBN 0-8264-7705-4.
- Deleuze, Gilles; Guattari, Félix (1987) [1980]. A Thousand Plateaus: Capitalism and Schizophrenia. Vol. 2. Trans. and foreword by Brian Massumi. Minneapolis and London: University of Minnesota Press. p. xvi. ISBN 978-0-8166-1401-1. OCLC 16472336.
- Massumi, Brian (2002). Parables for the Virtual: Movement, Affect, Sensation. Durham and London: Duke University Press. ISBN 978-0-8223-2897-1.
- Seyfert, Robert (2012). "Beyond Personal Feelings and Collective Emotions: A Theory of Social Affect". Theory, Culture & Society. 29 (6): 27–46. doi:10.1177/0263276412438591. S2CID 143590063.
- Spinoza, Benedictus de (2002) [1677]. Complete Works. Trans. by Samuel Shirley. Indianapolis and Cambridge: Hackett Publishing. p. 278. ISBN 978-0-87220-620-5.
- Skoggard, I. and Waterston, A. (2015), "Introduction: Toward an Anthropology of Affect and Evocative Ethnography." Anthropol Conscious, 26: 109–120. doi:10.1111/anoc.12041
- Spinoza, Benedictus de (1994). A Spinoza Reader: The Ethics and Other Works. Trans. by Edwin M. Curley. Princeton and Chichester: Princeton University Press. p. 154. ISBN 978-0-691-00067-1.
- Thrift, Nigel J. (2007). Non-representational Theory: Space, Politics, Affect. London: Routledge. ISBN 978-0-415-39320-1.
