= Masochism: Coldness and Cruelty =

1967 book by Gilles Deleuze

- Cover of the first edition
- Author: Gilles Deleuze
- Original title: Le Froid et le Cruel
- Translator: Jean McNeil and Aude Willm
- Language: French
- Subject: Leopold von Sacher-Masoch
- Published: 1967 (Editions de Minuit, in French); 1989 (Zone Books, in English)
- Publication place: France
- Media type: Print (Hardcover and Paperback)
- Pages: 293 (Zone Books edition)
- ISBN: 978-0942299557
- Preceded by: Le Bergsonisme (1966)
- Followed by: Différence et répétition (1968)

Masochism: Coldness and Cruelty (French: Présentation de Sacher-Masoch) is a 1967 book by the philosopher Gilles Deleuze, originally published in French as Le Froid et le Cruel (Les Éditions de Minuit, 1967), in which the author philosophically examines the work of the late 19th-century Austrian novelist Leopold von Sacher-Masoch. In the Foreword Deleuze states that Masoch has a particular way of "desexualising love while at the same time sexualizing the entire history of humanity". Deleuze attempts to "cut through" the various forms of expression and content that are the artistic creation of Leopold von Sacher-Masoch. He also attempts to develop a problematic of masochism in contradistinction to sadism, concluding that the two forms of 'pornology' are non-communicating, and cannot be integrated into Sadomasochistic entity. Deleuze argues that Masochism is something far more subtle and complex than the enjoyment of pain and that Masochism has nothing to do with Sadism.

== Contents ==
=== The Language of Sade and Masoch ===
Deleuze starts off by first moving from the clinical practice of associating proper names to diseases (Parkinson's and Roger's disease for instance). However, sometimes it is the patient's name that denotes the illness, as in the case of Masochism and Sadism. History of medicine, says Deleuze, can be regarded as a history of the illness (leprosy, plague) that dies and changes over time, and a history of the symptomatology. However, it is difficult to attribute a disease to Sade and Masoch, but a symptomatology and signs that they describe. It is no longer a matter of pain and sexual pleasure only but of bondage and humiliation as well. Therefore, the project is one that moves beyond the purely clinical realm.

However, the differences in Sade and Masoch are not of complementarity but of constituting completely different worlds. Sade uses a language of descriptions that aim at demonstration, whereas Masoch uses the description for a higher function, one of persuasion and education.

=== The Three Women ===
The three women in Masoch are the 1) primitive, uterine or hetaeric mother, 2) the punishing, Oedipal mother and 3) the nurturing oral mother. Masochism is the constant revolution around this constellation of mother images. It is the quest for the oral mother through the hetaeric and Oedipal mothers. This is achieved by inducing the hetaeric mother to betray and provoking the Oedipal mother to punish. Once in betrayal and under torture, the masochist seeks the oral mother.

=== Father and Mother ===
Deleuze also distinguishes between attitudes towards the paternal and maternal images in the two systems. In sadism, the Father's face is trampled over in a kind of rebellion that replaces the power figure with its own power, whereas the masochist turns the face away from the Father towards the mother, in a kind of rebellion that de-emphasises the power figure in favour of its opposite.

=== The Art of Masoch ===
In the Art of Masoch, Deleuze explains his notions of Irony and Humour, Contract and Ritual, and the differences between the sadistic superego and masochistic ego.

== Reception ==
Ronald Bogue writes that while Deleuze addresses traditional literary questions in Masochism: Coldness and Cruelty his primary concern is to "delineate the system of thought that informs the corpus" of Sacher-Masoch's works. According to Bogue, "Deleuze tries to revive the reputation of Sacher-Masoch, a celebrated and prolific novelist of the 1870s and 1880s now remembered only as the eponymous exemplar of masochism, by demonstrating that Sacher-Masoch is an astute psychologist and a profound thinker whose works...articulate a perverse idealism aimed at a subversion of the Kantian conception of law." He comments that Deleuze's study of Sacher-Masoch is "highly suggestive from both a psychoanalytic and a critical perspective" but that it is most significant for demonstrating how "writers can reconfigure the relationship between literature and philosophy."

The French psychoanalyst Jacques Lacan described it as "undoubtedly the best text that has ever been written" on masochism.

The critic Camille Paglia expressed a favorable view of Masochism, commenting that she "liked Gilles Deleuze's book on masochism".

Sexuality historian Alison M. Moore notes that Masoch was displeased to have a psychiatric category named after him by Richard von Krafft-Ebing, and that Deleuze conflates this psychiatric labelling imposed upon Masoch and his works by the prevailing alienist lines of thought of the nineteenth century with Masoch's own view of his desire as 'super-sensualism'.
