= Univocity of being =

Philosophical (ontological) concept in Medieval Christianity

Univocity of being is a religious philosophy originating in Medieval Christianity that states that words describing the properties of God mean the same thing as when they apply to people or things. It is associated with the doctrines of the Scholastic theologian John Duns Scotus.

== Scotus ==
In medieval disputes over the nature of God, many theologians and philosophers (such as Thomas Aquinas) held that when one says that "God is good" and that "man is good", man's goodness is only analogous to, i.e. similar to but distinct from, God's goodness. John Duns Scotus, while not denying the analogy of being of Thomas Aquinas, nonetheless holds to a univocal concept of being.

Scotus believed in a common concept of being that is proper to both God and man, though in two radically distinct modes: infinite in God, finite in man.

The claim here is that we understand God because we can share in his being, and by extension, the transcendental attributes of being, namely, goodness, truth, and unity. So far as Scotus is concerned, we need to be able to understand what 'being' is as a concept in order to demonstrate the existence of God, lest we compare what we know creation —to what we do not— God. Thomas Williams has defended a version of this argument.

== Gilles Deleuze ==
Gilles Deleuze borrowed the doctrine of ontological univocity from Scotus. He claimed that being is univocal, i.e., that all of its senses are affirmed in one voice. Deleuze adapts the doctrine of univocity to claim that being is, univocally, difference. "With univocity, however, it is not the differences which are and must be: it is being which is Difference, in the sense that it is said of difference. Moreover, it is not we who are univocal in a Being which is not; it is we and our individuality which remains equivocal in and for a univocal Being." Deleuze at once echoes and inverts Spinoza, who maintained that everything that exists is a modification of the one substance, God or Nature. He claims that it is the organizing principle of Spinoza's philosophy, despite the absence of the term from any of Spinoza's works. For Deleuze, there is no one substance, only an always-differentiating process, an origami cosmos, always folding, unfolding, refolding. Deleuze and Guattari summarize this ontology in the paradoxical formula "pluralism = monism".

== See also ==
- Unus mundus
- Fundamental ontology
- Henology
- Law of noncontradiction
