= Kafka: Toward a Minor Literature =

1975 book by Gilles Deleuze and Félix Guattari

- Book cover for Kafka: Toward a Minor Literature (1986) from the original French language title, Kafka: pour une littérature mineure (1975)
- Author: Gilles Deleuze and Felix Guattari
- Original title: Kafka: pour une littérature mineure
- Translator: Dana Polan
- Publication date: 1975
- English publication date: 1986

Kafka: Toward a Minor Literature (French: Kafka: pour une littérature mineure) is a 1975 book by Gilles Deleuze and Félix Guattari.

== Publication ==
Kafka: pour une littérature mineure was first published in French in 1975. It was translated to German in 1976 and English in 1986. Dana Polan translated the English edition as Kafka: Toward a Minor Literature for the University of Minnesota Press's "Theory and History of Literature" series.

== Bibliography ==
- Barnett, Stuart (1987). "Review of Kafka: Toward a Minor Literature". Criticism. 29 (4): 552–554. ISSN 0011-1589. JSTOR 23110518.
- Bogue, Ronald (1997). "Minor Writing and Minor Literature". Symplokē. 5 (1/2): 99–118. doi:10.1353/sym.2005.0051. ISSN 1069-0697. JSTOR 40550404. S2CID 144235355.
- Edmunds, Lowell (2010). "Kafka on Minor Literature". German Studies Review. 33 (2): 351–374. ISSN 0149-7952. JSTOR 20787912.
- Klein, Rony (March 2018). "D'une redéfinition de la littérature mineure". Littérature (in French). 189 (1): 72–88. doi:10.3917/litt.189.0072. ISBN 9782200931650. ISSN 0047-4800.
- Koelb, Clayton (1987). "Review of Kafka: Toward a Minor Literature. Theory and History of Literature 30". Modern Fiction Studies. 33 (2): 376–378. doi:10.1353/mfs.0.1120. ISSN 0026-7724. JSTOR 26282454. S2CID 162188058.
- Moberg, Bergur Rønne; Damrosch, David (January 1, 2017). "Introduction: Defining the Ultraminor". Journal of World Literature. 2 (2): 133–137. doi:10.1163/24056480-00202001. ISSN 2405-6472.
- Schlant, Ernestine (1988). "Review of Kafka: Toward a Minor Literature; Franz Kafka; Die Deportation des Menschen. Kafkas Erzählung 'In der Strafkolonie' im europäischen Kontext". The German Quarterly. 61 (3): 472–476. doi:10.2307/406461. ISSN 0016-8831. JSTOR 406461.
