= Immanent evaluation =

Gilles Deleuze' philosophical concept

Immanent evaluation is a philosophical concept used by Gilles Deleuze in his essay "Qu'est-ce qu'un dispositif ?" (1989), where it is seen as the opposite of transcendent judgment.

Deleuze writes about Michel Foucault: "Foucault ... makes allusion to 'aesthetic' criteria, which are understood as criteria for life and replace on each occasion the claims of transcendental [sic] judgement [jugement transcendant] with an immanent evaluation [évaluation immanente]".
