= The Synarchy of Molten Bones =

2016 EP by Deathspell Omega

- The cover of The Synarchy of Molten Bones

EP by Deathspell Omega
- Released: 8 November 2016
- Genre: Black metal
- Length: 29:12
- Labels: Norma Evangelium Diaboli; The Ajna Offensive; Season of Mist

Deathspell Omega chronology
Drought (2012)	The Synarchy of Molten Bones (2016)	The Furnaces of Palingenesia (2019)

The Synarchy of Molten Bones is an extended play (EP) (Note: AllMusic categorizes Synarchy as a full-length studio album (LP). Additionally, Deathspell Omega's record label, Norma Evangelium Diaboli, promoted Synarchy as an LP ahead of its release.) by the French black metal band Deathspell Omega. The record label Norma Evangelium Diaboli released it on 8 November 2016 in most territories; The Ajna Offensive released it in North America, while Season of Mist sent it to record stores in the United States. The band's first release since the 2012 EP Drought, Synarchy incorporates influence from progressive metal by way of compositional twists such as changes in tempo and time signature. Its songs are dissonant, complex, and technical, but not without occasional use of melody. The EP received positive reviews from music critics, with much of the praise directed towards its ferocious and complex material, although some critics found it similar to the band's previous work. Multiple reviewers considered the track "Onward Where Most with Ravin I May Meet" to be among Deathspell's best songs, and the EP as a whole to be among the best heavy releases of 2016.

== Background and release ==
Deathspell Omega were a prolific black metal band during the 2000s and into the early 2010s: They frequently released studio albums (LPs) and extended plays (EPs) between the 2004 LP Si monvmentvm reqvires, circvmspice, and the 2012 EP Drought. These releases presented an experimental and unconventional approach to black metal, with metaphysical lyrics that discussed the relationship between God, Satan, and humans. The band largely chose to remain anonymous, (Note: In a 2026 interview with the fanzine Bardo Methodology, the French musician Christian Bouché, also known as Hasjarl, self-identified as the band's guitarist. He also named the Finnish musician Mikko Aspa as the vocalist and the pseudonymous Khaos as the bassist.) which allowed listeners to focus more on the content of each release.

In late September 2016, the band announced a new EP, The Synarchy of Molten Bones, on their Bandcamp page and slated it for an 8 November release. This move was uncharacteristic for them, as they had a proclivity to release LPs and EPs unannounced. The record label Norma Evangelium Diaboli made Synarchy available for streaming on 31 October, eight days ahead of its official release. The Ajna Offensive released the EP in North America, while Season of Mist distributed it to record stores in the United States.

== Composition ==
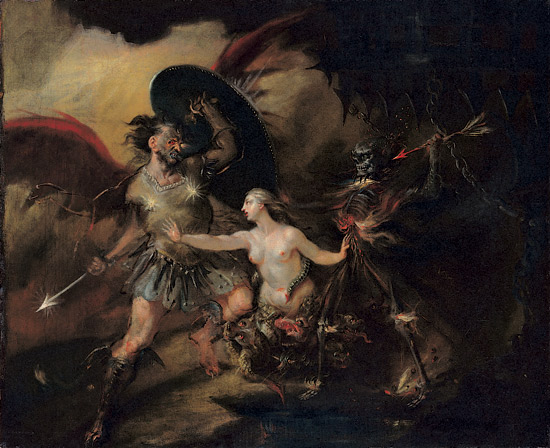
Paradise Lost by John Milton (illustration of a scene pictured) inspired some of the lyrics on Synarchy.

Synarchy is a 29-minute black metal EP comprising four songs: "The Synarchy of Molten Bones"; "Famished for Breath"; "Onward Where Most with Ravin I May Meet"; and "Internecine Iatrogenesis". The EP contains elements of progressive metal: Shifts in tempo and time signature frequently occur, and each song harbors multiple distinct segments. Music critic Anthony Fantano considered it to be a fusion of black metal and death metal, and described the growled vocals as "monstrous". The lyrics generally continue in the same vein as preceding releases by the band, with religious references and apocalyptic themes. In a 2019 interview with the fanzine Bardo Methodology, the band stated that the EP's final lyrics, wherein "Death is set free to prey upon the Earth", were inspired by John Milton's epic poem Paradise Lost. The British author Dayal Patterson called the EP "relatively familiar" in the 2023 edition of his book, Black Metal: Evolution of the Cult.

Musically, Synarchy utilizes typical metal instrumentation of distorted guitars, bass, and drums. It also features occasional brass and choir parts, including at the start of the opening title track. When interviewed in 2020 for the fanzine Imhotep, the band credited three specific works of music as influences for Synarchy because of their "energy" and "dissonance": Gorguts's 1998 LP Obscura; King Crimson's 1974 LP Red; and Magma's 1976 composition "De Futura". Songs make use of modulation, with music journalist Joseph Schafer remarking that "[Deathspell] play the same four chords five, maybe 10 different ways in one song". The instrumental parts on Synarchy are technical. When reporting on the pre-release stream, Metal Injection's Greg Kennelty quipped: "Whoever drummed on this cannot be human, and the rest of the instrumentation keeps up with the absolutely frenetic pace."

Reviewers found the EP's music to be challenging or even disorienting: Exclaim! writer Natalie Zina Walschots spoke of "brain-bleeding riff structures", while Invisible Oranges's Ian Cory likened the outro of "Famished" to "someone playing a record backwards and forwards simultaneously". Max Frank for MetalSucks compared its compositional quirks to the work of Frank Zappa, while Trevor Strnad for Metal Injection viewed its heaviness as similar to two of Deathspell's previous releases: Si monvmentvm and the 2007 LP Fas – Ite, Maledicti, in Ignem Aeternum. Although it is complex and dissonant overall, Synarchy sporadically incorporates melody into its songs.

== Reception ==
Professional ratings
Review scores
Source	Rating
Decibel	8/10
Exclaim!	9/10
Kaaoszine	8–/10

Synarchy garnered positive reviews from music critics. Exclaim! writer Adam Nizam posited that Deathspell made highly effective use of the EP's short runtime. Nizam additionally considered that the material on offer was varied while still unleashing "a constant attack on the listener's senses, from every direction". He believed "Iatrogenesis" to be a somewhat weaker track, but still worthwhile. Conversely, Kennelty deemed it the most essential track on the EP, which he hailed as a success in every regard. Cory asserted that Deathspell's relative anonymity made their music more convincing than that of their peers. He also praised the music for its fast pace, which he said "heighten[ed] the drama" compared to the band's previous two releases: Drought and the 2010 LP Paracletus.

Critics often likened Synarchy to Deathspell's past work. Metal Storm selected it as a "staff pick" and complimented the band as reliable, but also commented that the EP was similar to their previous output. Joe DiVita for Loudwire said that Synarchy "offer[ed] exactly what their existing fans crave[d]" and expressed both enthusiasm for the material on the EP, and doubt that it would convert listeners who had been unenthused with the band's other material. Writing for Kaaoszine, Juri Hiltunen found the EP to be somewhat disorganized and too reminiscent of past releases from the band, and criticized the percussion as overbearing. Otherwise, Hiltunen's review was laudatory, with praise for the vocals, instrumental prowess, and unsettling atmosphere.

Schafer and Cory singled out the 10-minute "Onward" for acclaim. Both writers considered it to be among Deathspell's best songs, and a summation of the band's body of work. Schafer cited the song as evidence that Deathspell were effectively inimitable, insofar as bands taking influence from them had yet to replicate their level of quality. Cory lauded multiple facets of the song, including the musicianship, atmosphere, and Deathspell's songwriting. He also believed the song was better for the band's secrecy.

=== Year-end lists ===
Several critics included Synarchy on lists of the best releases of 2016. Frank ranked it at number 14, praising how it felt "raw and personally performed". Staff writers for Invisible Oranges put it in a tie with 40 Watt Sun's Wider than the Sky at number 10. The EP was 10th on Exclaim!'s list of the year's best metal and hardcore releases; Walschots called it "a triumphant, vicious, visceral half-hour of music". Strnad placed it at number two and opined that it was possibly Deathspell's best release to date.

== Track listing ==
No.	Title	Length
1.	"The Synarchy of Molten Bones"	6:58
2.	"Famished for Breath"	6:10
3.	"Onward Where Most with Ravin I May Meet"	10:12
4.	"Internecine Iatrogenesis"	5:52
Total length:		29:12
