= Fas – Ite, Maledicti, in Ignem Aeternum =

2007 studio album by Deathspell Omega

- The album cover for Fas – Ite, Maledicti, in Ignem Aeternum

Studio album by Deathspell Omega
- Released: 16 July 2007
- Genres: Black metal; avant-garde metal
- Length: 46:16
- Labels: Norma Evangelium Diaboli; The Ajna Offensive
- Producer: Franck Hueso

Deathspell Omega chronology
Kénôse (2005)	Fas – Ite, Maledicti, in Ignem Aeternum (2007)	Veritas Diaboli Manet in Aeternum: Chaining the Katechon (2008)

Fas – Ite, Maledicti, in Ignem Aeternum (Latin for "divine law – depart, ye cursed, into everlasting fire") is the fourth studio album by the French black metal band Deathspell Omega. The record label Norma Evangelium Diaboli released the album in Europe on 16 July 2007; The Ajna Offensive released it in the United States on 17 July. The album takes its title from the Vulgate translation of Matthew 25:41, "discedite a me maledicti in ignem æternum", usually quoted as "ite maledicti in ignem aeternum". Franck Hueso helmed production duties, while Timo Ketola designed the artwork. Fas follows Si monvmentvm reqvires, circvmspice (2004) and precedes Paracletus (2010) in a conceptual trilogy of albums about the relationships between God, Satan, and humans.

The album's lyrics extensively reference works by the French intellectual Georges Bataille and take a philosophical approach to Satanism, although the band has refused to specify what the lyrics mean. Fas is a black metal and avant-garde metal album which incorporates elements of several other genres. It features intense, dissonant, and technical music interspersed with choral and ambient passages. The album received acclaim from music critics upon release, with much of the praise directed towards the lyrics, experimentation, and instrumental ability; some critics were divided on the vocals. Fans and journalists have cited Fas among Deathspell's finest work; the magazines Metal Maniacs and Terrorizer named it the best album of 2007, and it has appeared on lists of the greatest black metal albums of all time.

== Background and release ==
Deathspell Omega released their third studio album, Si monvmentvm reqvires, circvmspice (abbreviated to SMRC), in 2004. Although it included some traditional black metal passages – which were compared to Darkthrone by PopMatters writer Dane Profokiev – it generally took an avant-garde approach to the genre. The band's music became more complex, technical, and dissonant, while their lyrics on the topic of Satanism acquired a philosophical bent. Deathspell followed SMRC with Kénôse (2005), an extended play which elaborated on the band's new direction. Black metal fans and music journalists considered the band's then-recent output to be innovative and forward-thinking, and hype grew around them. (Note: Attributed to multiple sources:)

In June 2007, the record label Norma Evangelium Diaboli announced Deathspell's fourth studio album, Fas – Ite, Maledicti, in Ignem Aeternum, and slated it for a 16 July release in Europe. The Ajna Offensive released it in the United States on 17 July; pre-orders became available four days prior, on Friday the 13th. (Note: Attributed to multiple sources:) Fas is the second in a conceptual trilogy of albums with metaphysical lyrics discussing the relationship between God, Satan, and humankind; the trilogy began with SMRC and concluded with Paracletus (2010). (Note: Reviews published in Revolver and Stylus Magazine called Fas the third album in the trilogy, with Kénôse being the second. Because it is an extended play, Kénôse is instead considered an appendix to the trilogy.) Wanting listeners to focus on the content of each release, Deathspell's members maintained anonymity, including by omitting any credits from the liner notes. In a 2026 interview with the fanzine Bardo Methodology, the French musician Christian Bouché, also known as Hasjarl, self-identified as the band's guitarist. He additionally named the Finnish musician Mikko Aspa as the vocalist and the pseudonymous Khaos as the bassist. The band has a drummer.

== Recording, title, and artwork ==
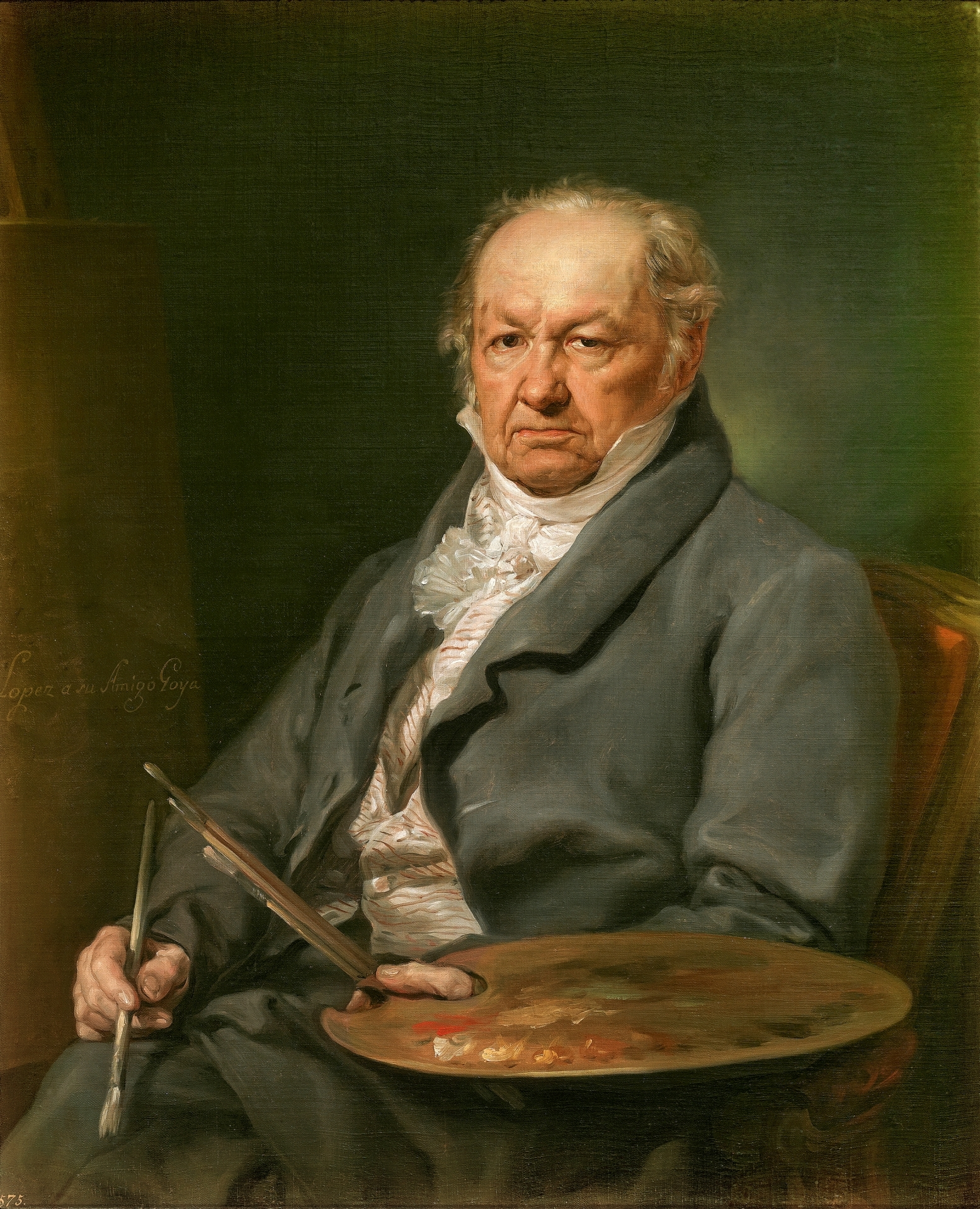
The booklet for Fas uses artwork adapted from Los caprichos by Francisco Goya.

According to Bouché, the recording and mixing sessions for Fas were taxing and perfectionist. "[E]very second of [the album] underwent obsessive rehearsals", he told Bardo Methodology. Bouché mixed the album himself in a process which he reported took "[a] full month". He attributed this largely to the number of tracks used for each song, recalling that "[g]uitars alone ... ran to no fewer than three or four dozen". He also sought to prioritize the percussion in the mix, while ensuring the bass guitar would still be audible. Franck Hueso, better known as Carpenter Brut, helmed the album's production. Bouché provided Hueso with recordings and samples, and supervised his work in arranging them. Hueso also fixed any errors present in the material.

The album title is Latin for "divine law – depart, ye cursed, into everlasting fire". It derives from the Vulgate translation of Matthew 25:41, "discedite a me, maledicti, in ignem æternum", which is usually quoted as "ite maledicti in ignem aeternum". The original Bible quote in full is "Jesus says, 'Depart from me, you cursed, into the eternal fire prepared for the devil and his angels'". The graphic artist Timo Ketola designed the artwork for Fas upon commission from Deathspell, continuing a working relationship which began with SMRC. According to Ketola, his earnings from the commission – which he said was among his most labor-intensive – exceeded what he needed for two months' worth of rent. Ketola took roughly two weeks to complete the design, working under a tight schedule with a 10 April deadline which he said Bouché had imposed.

The front cover is an illustration of Satan's fall. It depicts him falling through a black abyss with his stomach torn open and yellow beams of light emanating from above; he is dressed in a white robe which partially covers his face. The back cover comprises five circles – one in the center, the other four arranged in the shape of a diamond. The central circle is enclosed by flames and contains the word "Obombration", which is the name of both the opening and closing songs on the album. The other four circles each house a title of one of the middle four songs: "The Shrine of Mad Laughter"; "Bread of Bitterness"; "The Repellent Scars of Abandon and Election"; and "A Chore for the Lost". Profokiev interpreted the use of flames to represent Satan, or Lucifer; the name Lucifer itself is Latin for "morning star". Bouché and Ketola intended for the use of crooked, zigzagging arrows connecting the five circles to represent the events in every track's lyrics happening at the same time, as opposed to a narrative progression from the beginning to the end.

Fas's booklet contains greyscale drawings which reviewers Todd DePalma and Stewart Voegtlin described for Stylus Magazine as "spare illustrations of dejected human creatures blistered before an enemy star". Bouché reportedly sent Ketola copies of works by the Spanish artist Francisco Goya, including The Disasters of War and Los caprichos. In what Ketola called a "misstep", he derived the booklet artwork by tracing, with some alterations, from Los caprichos.

== Concepts and composition ==
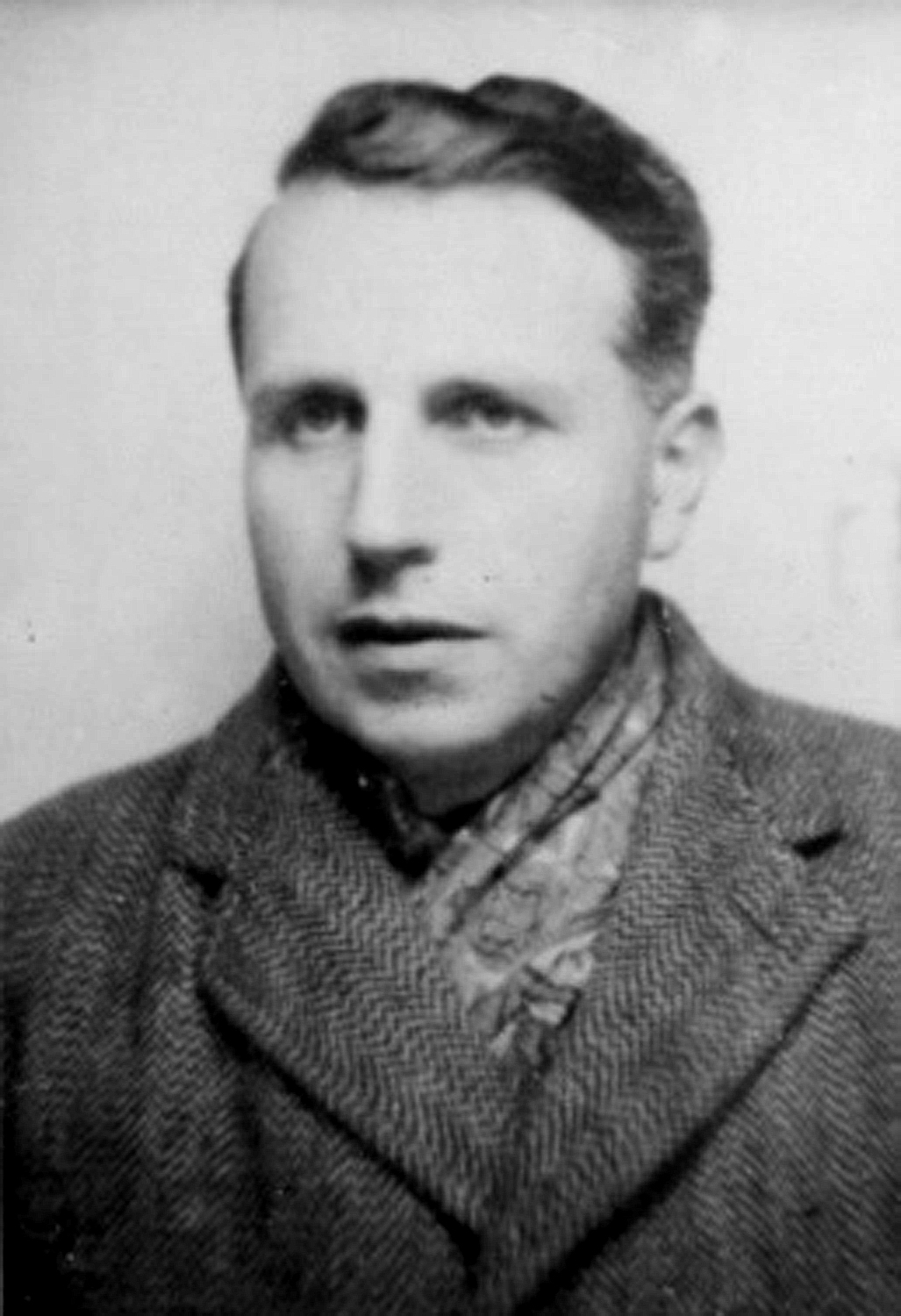
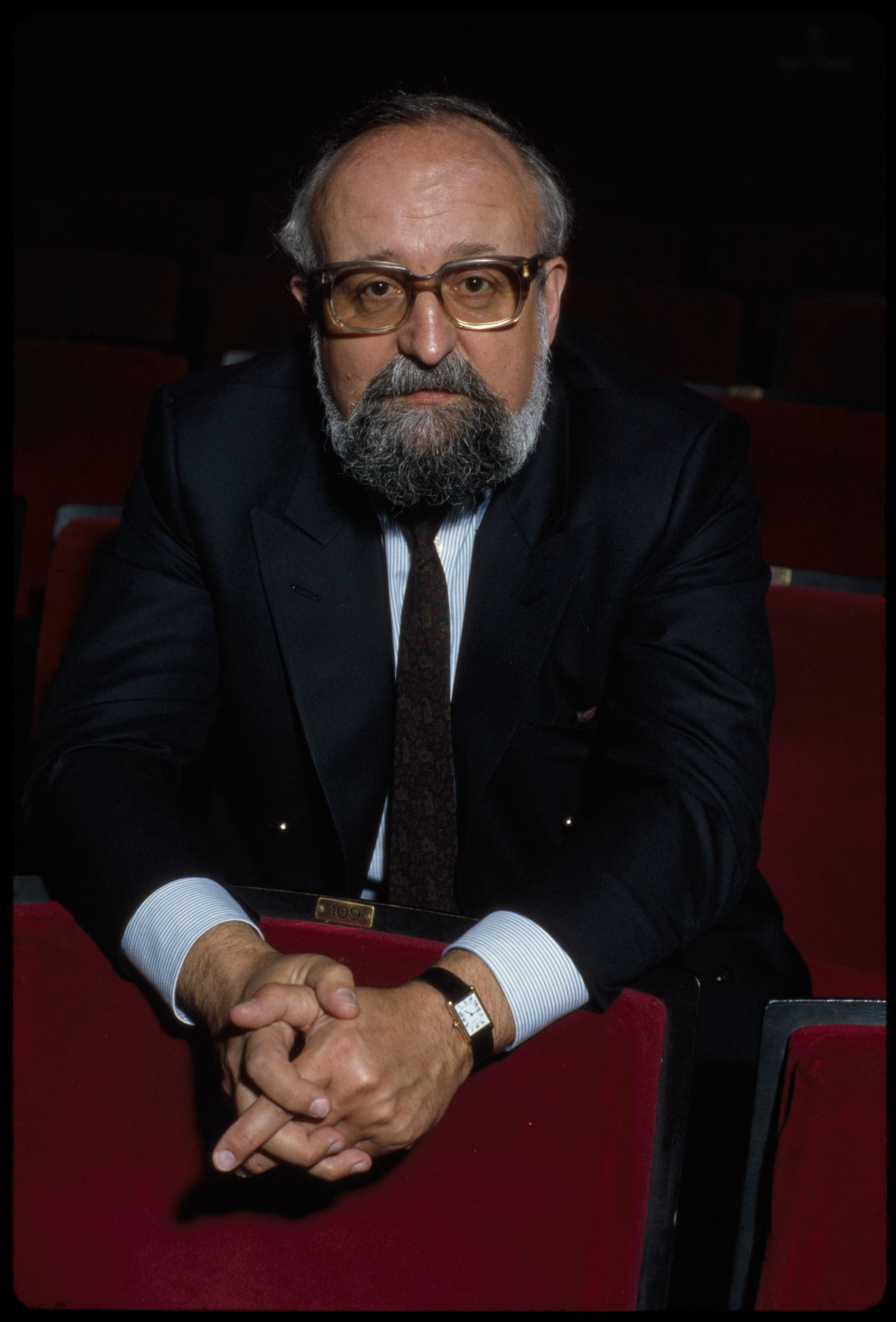
Many of the lyrics on Fas draw from several writings by Georges Bataille (left), while the compositions of Krzysztof Penderecki (right) influenced the album's music.

The band has refused to elucidate the meanings of specific lyrics, preferring instead to let listeners make their own analyses. Many fans have written such analyses online. A press release from The Ajna Offensive described the concept of Fas as "centred on the notion of divine will, on the seed of perdition that is ontologically a part of Man and therefore of immanent judgement." Profokiev remarked that while the lyrics of SMRC were religious in tone, those of Fas leaned further into philosophy and constituted "wanton abuse of uncommon and difficult vocabulary". He posited that the word obombration was coined by the band as a derivation from the Latin word obumbrō, which means "to overshadow". Stylus Magazine wrote that the lyrics included phrases in Koine Greek and Ecclesiastical Latin; the magazine also compared them to the sermon "Sinners in the Hands of an Angry God" by the American theologian Jonathan Edwards. In a review for The Village Voice, Phil Freeman described the lyrics as "combining genuinely poetic evocations of despair with lectures on Satanism-as-metaphysics".

The lyrics on Fas, and many of Deathspell's other works, draw substantial inspiration from the French intellectual Georges Bataille. The line "Every human being not going to the extreme limit is the servant or the enemy of man" in "A Chore for the Lost" comes from his book Inner Experience. Many of the album's lyrics are taken verbatim from the book, as well as his other works Theory of Religion and The Solar Anus; another, My Mother, also informed the lyrics. When reviewing Fas for AllMusic, Thom Jurek interpreted Deathspell's use of Bataille's texts to be "for the purpose of explaining the Devil not as God's mystical antithesis, but as a pure nihilistic humanist construct that is synthesis." Jurek also surmised that the album provided "a very concrete view of the 'real' theory of Satanism as practiced in Europe." A conference paper published in the 2020 edition of the academic book series Advances in the Human Side of Service Engineering cited one of the album's lyrics, "Domine, in pulverem mortis deduxisti me, perinde ac cadaver" (translated from Latin as "Lord, you have led me into the dust of death, like a corpse"), as evidence that Deathspell's lyrical content portrayed God as a force of hate.

Fas is a black metal (Note: Attributed to multiple sources:) and avant-garde metal album which runs for 46 minutes and 16 seconds. Music journalists detected elements of several other genres, including post-rock, (Note: Attributed to multiple sources:) jazz, (Note: Attributed to multiple sources:) post-punk, death metal, and mathcore. In interviews, Bouché credited classical composers Krzysztof Penderecki and Ivan Wyschnegradsky as influences. Penderecki, in particular, inspired the album's use of dissonance as texture, while the influence of Wyschnegradsky imparted microtonality to the album's music. The album is mostly through-composed, with few repeated lyrics or musical themes. Profokiev wrote that the first "Obombration" establishes a "surreal" atmosphere. Though Fas predominantly features typical metal instrumentation of distorted electric guitar, bass guitar, and percussion, it also implements choirs, brass, and ambience. The closing "Obombration" uses detuned piano chords. Slow and quiet sections – described as "unsettling" by Decibel and "drowsy interludes" by Stylus Magazine – appear between fast, intense, and chaotic passages. DePalma, Jurek, and Voegtlin characterized Hueso's production as loud, while Metal Injection writer Cosmo Lee considered that "the jangly dissonance glints eerily".

The music on Fas is dissonant, complex, and technical. Alec A. Head for Satan Stole My Teddybear found variety in Bouché's guitarwork, writing that he "jump[s] from Daniel Ash-like post-punk fury to black metal malevolence to sweeping arpeggios and back again". Lee compared the guitar riffs to the fast and erratic motions of lizards, and wrote that the drums were "just as askew". The album features atonal and high-pitched guitar solos; T.T. of the Austrian black metal band Abigor performed them after Bouché, seeking an outsider's perspective, invited him as a session musician. Tyler of Scene Point Blank and Head called the drumming "brutal" and "ridiculous", respectively. Freeman said that "A Chore for the Lost" contained "swirling electronics, throbbing basslines, and croaked vocals over thundering, breathtakingly chaotic drums". Aspa utilizes a monotone delivery for his raspy, growled vocals. Jurek described them as "seemingly maniacal onomatopoeia", while Terrorizer writer John Mincemoyer called them "cold [and] almost passionless".

== Critical reception ==
Professional ratings
Review scores
Source	Rating
AllMusic	4/5 stars
Metal Injection	8/10
Metal.de	7/10
PopMatters	10/10
Rock Hard	9/10
Scene Point Blank	9.4/10
Terrorizer	9.5/10

Upon release, Fas received critical acclaim. Terrorizer selected it as their Album of the Month; Mincemoyer surmised that the mixture of disparate elements yielded a "queasily exhilarating listening experience". He perceived the album as "requir[ing] undisturbed and repeated listens", and opined that each replay revealed new details. Freeman commended the album's lyrics and avant-garde tendencies, writing: "Violent and philosophical in equal measure, this album is a work of genuine and very dark art." He highlighted "The Repellent Scars of Abandon and Election" and "A Chore for the Lost" as standout songs. Lee called the music on the album a "forceful, but sideways attack", and compared it to the work of the Canadian death metal band Cryptopsy. In response to the lyric, "Am I deranged?", Lee quipped: "Probably yes, and all the better for it". Head said it was "one of the most dense and truly scary albums this side of [the Canadian extreme metal band] Strapping Young Lad" and that the music was overwhelming in its range and depth. He was particularly fond of the guitarwork by Bouché and T.T., which he deemed "wizard[ry]". (Note: Because T.T. was not formally credited until 2026, Head's review credited the guitarwork solely to Bouché (as Hasjarl).) Aaron Burgess for Revolver praised the album's content as subversive, and opined that it felt otherworldly on account of the clandestine nature of the band.

Several critics argued that Fas represented a progression for black metal as a whole. Jurek hailed it as Deathspell's best album to date; he called it "inventive", extolled the lyrics as sophisticated and the music as ferocious yet creative, and viewed the interludes as adding atmosphere and variety. Tyler agreed with Jurek that the album moved black metal forward, and asserted that it deserved the listener's undivided attention. Further, he lauded its ambition, experimentation, atmosphere, and dynamics, all attributes which he said lent the album a filmic quality. He also commented on the technical prowess of the musicians, as well as Aspa's "unique" and "menacing" delivery of "captivating" lyrics. Writing for Rock Hard, Volkmar Weber exalted the album as one which pushed the boundaries of black metal, and considered the combined effect of the music and lyrics to be hypnotic. Erik of Metal.de offered qualified praise: He felt that the vocals were not energetic enough for the material at hand, and that "A Chore for the Lost" was a climax which Fas did not fully earn, but enjoyed the album overall and expressed that there was little else wrong with it.

Not all initial reception was positive. DePalma and Voegtlin's review for Stylus Magazine complimented the band's instrumental performances as "immaculate", but otherwise lambasted the album. They criticized the music as incoherent and the lyrics as evocative of "a morose MySpacer overdosed on Aquinas". They also disapproved of what they perceived as a lack of enthusiasm in the vocal delivery, and called the second "Obombration" an overblown ending.

=== Legacy and accolades ===
The British author Dayal Patterson, in the 2023 edition of his book Black Metal: Evolution of the Cult, considered Fas to be the definitive Deathspell album. His observation of its reception was that "[f]or many, it is the most important album by the band, a huge undertaking that provides an incomparable sonic, philosophical and spiritual journey." In a 2012 retrospective on the trilogy, Profokiev awarded a collective perfect score to all three albums. He specifically called Fas an "exceptional masterpiece that will be thoroughly enjoyed by people who have obtained the elusive acquired taste for experimental forms of black metal". He also lauded the relationship between the music and lyrics as synergistic, and praised the lyrics themselves as thought-provoking.

Terrorizer and Metal Maniacs crowned Fas the best album of 2007. Revolver and Decibel listed it at numbers 14 and 11, respectively, while Pitchfork called it the year's second-best metal album. The Wire's Edwin Pouncey included it among his unranked top 15 black metal albums of the year. Tiny Mix Tapes highlighted it as one of 2007's "Eureka!" albums, which was a designation the magazine's writers used for their favorite avant-garde releases of the year. In 2009, Decibel ranked it at number 40 on its list of the 100 Greatest Metal Albums of the Decade; four years later, the magazine placed it at number 74 on its list of the Top 100 Black Metal Albums of All Time. It appeared on Metal Hammer's 2018 unranked list of the 40 greatest black metal albums.

== Track listing ==
No.	Title	Length
1.	"Obombration"	4:48
2.	"The Shrine of Mad Laughter"	10:37
3.	"Bread of Bitterness"	7:49
4.	"The Repellent Scars of Abandon and Election"	11:40
5.	"A Chore for the Lost"	9:15
6.	"Obombration"	2:07
Total length:		46:16

== Personnel ==
Credits are adapted from interviews conducted by Bardo Methodology.

Deathspell Omega

- Mikko Aspa – vocals
- Christian Bouché – guitar, mixing
- Khaos – bass

Additional personnel

- T.T. – guitar
- Franck Hueso – production
- Timo Ketola – artwork
