= Kénôse =

EP by Deathspell Omega
- Released: October 4, 2005
- Genres: Black metal; avant-garde metal
- Length: 36:20
- Label: Norma Evangelium Diaboli

Deathspell Omega chronology
Si monvmentvm reqvires, circvmspice (2004)	Kénôse (2005)	Fas – Ite, Maledicti, in Ignem Aeternum (2007)

Kénôse is an EP by the black metal band Deathspell Omega, released in 2005 under The Ajna Offensive. It continues the avant-garde and progressive direction they had been exploring on 2004's Si monvmentvm reqvires, circvmspice, and is considered by the band as something of an "appendix" to that album.

== Concept ==
Kénôse draws on a range of theological and philosophical themes.The title Kénôse means Kenosis in French, a theological term which describes "the 'self-emptying' of one's own will and becoming entirely receptive to God's divine will." In particular it refers to the notion within Christology that God emptied himself of his divine characteristics in order to be made manifest as a mortal being in the form of Christ. One analysis of this term draws on The Anxiety of Influence by Harold Bloom, which defines the term in two senses:

"...a breaking device similar to the defense mechanisms our psyches employ against repetition compulsions; kenosis then is a movement toward discontinuity with the precursor. From St. Paul, who uses the term in regard to Jesus’ empties the divine out of himself to assume human form. Similarly the poet empties out the poetic afflatus of the precursor. The precursor too is emptied out."

One of the main themes of the record is a pursuit of the essence or substance of God and Christ in the light of Kenosis. The band ask whether, on Christ's death and return to immortality, God's essence remained as pure as it was before, or indeed whether he has "succumbed to the original malady": death. The lyrics form an argument against the concept of redemption; holding that humanity is irredeemable, and instead invoking plerosis, a blasphemous flowering of humanity's carnal condition in spite of God. The issue of hypostasis and hypostatic union is discussed at length, with the opening track's lyrics asking:

"Was there not an inconceivable loss of knowledge at Bethlehem? Christ's abasement, His subjecting Himself to the laws of Human birth and growth and to the lowliness of fallen human nature... Did the Son remain the transcendent Logos, is there not a radical and fatal discontinuity between the consciousness of the transcendent Logos and the secular Jesus?"

The opening track's lyrics also quote from Philippians 2:5-8 in defence of this claim. The very first line of the record is a quote from The Great Chain of Being by Arthur Lovejoy which reads "Everything, except GOD, has in itself some measure of privation, thus all individuals may be graded according to the degree to which they are infected with mere potentiality". Thus the EP seeks to show the debasement of Christ through his incarnation as a fragile mortal. It also references Georges Bataille's Base Materialism, as well as a motet for use during the Adoration of the Cross on Good Friday. The second track, II, quotes Martin Luther that "Therefore God honours the sword" from Whether Soldiers, Too, Can Be Saved (1526) in which Luther defends war on religious grounds and describes soldiers as God's instrument. The full quote is:

"Therefore, God honors the sword so highly that He calls it His own ordinance, and will not have men say or imagine that they have invented it or instituted it. For the hand that wields this sword and slays with it is then no more man's hand, but God's, and it is not man but God, who hangs, tortures, beheads, slays and fights. All these are His work and His judgments..."

== Critical reception ==
Professional ratings
Review scores
Source	Rating
AllMusic	3.5/5 stars
Blabbermouth.net	8/10 stars
Scream Magazine	5/6 stars
Stylus	B+

Kénôse received positive reviews from music critics. AllMusic praised the technical skill of the musicians as well as the inclusion of non-traditional musical elements, writing that "Guitars and drums are played with razor-sharp precision throughout, and the indecipherable vocals sound exactly like Beelzebub on a bad day." Blabbermouth praised the avant-garde and experimental characteristics of the record, concluding that "The combination of a strong sound mix, accomplished musicianship, and pure aural dread makes "Kenose" a particularly engaging experience. Add to that the digipack packaging with a 40-page booklet and you've got yourself a winner." John Serba for The Grand Rapids Press deemed it his third-favorite release of 2005 and described it as "pure, blasphemous black metal art".

== Track listing ==
No.	Title	Length
1.	"I"	15:46
2.	"II"	11:25
3.	"III"	9:09
Total length:		36:20
