= The Furnaces of Palingenesia =

Studio album by Deathspell Omega
- Released: May 24, 2019
- Genres: Black metal, avant-garde metal
- Length: 45:18
- Label: Norma Evangelium Diaboli

Deathspell Omega chronology
The Synarchy of Molten Bones (2016)	The Furnaces of Palingenesia (2019)	The Long Defeat (2022)

The Furnaces of Palingenesia is the sixth studio album by French black metal band Deathspell Omega, released on 24 May 2019 through Norma Evangelium Diaboli. It represents a significant shift in the band's lyrical themes from Satanism to anti-authoritarianism.

== Recording ==
The band recorded the album live in a studio using analogue gear, and it was mastered more quietly than most of the band's preceding material, also reflecting a shift in production approach.

== Lyrical themes ==
A month after the album's release, Deathspell Omega conducted its first formal interview in 15 years with Niklas Göransson, the editor of metal publication Bardo Methodology. During the interview, the band stated that album is presented as a manifesto from a dictator speaking for a political faction referred to as "the Order". It was influenced by French philosopher Georges Bataille, who opposed both the authoritarianism of the left from the Soviet Union and the authoritarianism of the right from Fascist Italy and Nazi Germany.

The band discussed a major impetus for the interview and the album being the Doomsday Clock being at two minutes to midnight, citing concerns over the degradation of the natural environment and the growing presence of authoritarian politics. They referenced Maximillien Aue, the villainous narrator of Jonathan Littell's novel The Kindly Ones, in discussing the narration style of the album, contrasting his perspective with Winston Smith's from George Orwell's Nineteen Eighty-Four.

The band noted that a major purpose of The Furnaces of Palingenesia was to "shatter a myth that's so central to stability both on an individual and civilisational level: the impervious necessity to believe that what we do is just, that we are just, that good and evil in intent and deed are as distinct as night and day." They also argued:

Twice, man committed the highest of crimes: by waging an absolutist war against nature and, therefore, against life itself. And, secondly, by severing the bond to nature and forging an anthropocentric worldview that places man above everything else and, therefore, can be used to justify just about anything – no matter how short-sighted or ill-advised – so long as it appears to serve mankind's interests. Extracting man from the natural order, by intent if not in effect, was a sign of hubris which remains literally without equivalent and whose resulting devastations will know no equivalent either. Listen carefully enough and you'll hear demonic snigger.

== Reception ==
Professional ratings
Review scores
Source	Rating
Exclaim!	8/10
Rock Zone	8/10
Sputnikmusic	5/5

The Furnaces of Palingenesia received positive reviews from music critics. Sputnikmusic writer Miloslaw Archibald Rugallini awarded the album a perfect score: He called it "awe-inspiringly monstrous and frighteningly relevant", lauding the lyrics as harrowing. He also opined that the production made Deathspell Omega sound more authentic than they ever had before. Brayden Turenne for Exclaim! remarked on the album's variety, praising the balance of slow-paced songs with faster, more technical ones; Turenne considered it to be "another notch of excellence on an arguably flawless discography". In a review for Rock Zone, Pau Navarra considered that the album was greater than the sum of its parts, and complimented its flow. Metal Storm's Auntie Sahar hailed it as the band's best album since Fas – Ite, Maledicti, in Ignem Aeternum (2007) and agreed with Turenne in praising the album as varied.

== Track listing ==
No.	Title	Length
1.	"Neither Meaning nor Justice"	2:16
2.	"The Fires of Frustration"	4:59
3.	"Ad arma! Ad arma!"	4:09
4.	"Splinters from Your Mother's Spine"	3:12
5.	"Imitatio Dei"	4:56
6.	"1523"	3:37
7.	"Sacrificial Theopathy"	2:37
8.	"Standing on the Work of Slaves"	3:23
9.	"Renegade Ashes"	5:23
10.	"Absolutist Regeneration"	5:27
11.	"You Cannot Even Find the Ruins…"	5:19
Total length:		45:18
