= Deathspell Omega =

French black metal band

- Origin: France
- Genres: Black metal; avant-garde metal
- Years active: 1998–present
- Labels: Norma Evangelium Diaboli, Northern Heritage, End All Life, Season of Mist

Deathspell Omega are a French black metal band formed in 1998. The group is an anonymous collective that has never confirmed the identity of its members.

Their lyrics deal with metaphysical Satanism, and the philosophies of Bataille and Hegel.

From 2004 to 2010, the band released a trilogy of concept albums – Si monvmentvm reqvires, circvmspice, Fas – Ite, Maledicti, in Ignem Aeternum and Paracletus – that focus on the theology of God and Satan. On the band's sixth album, The Furnaces of Palingenesia (2019), the lyrics focus on anti-authoritarian themes.

The band's seventh and most recent album, The Long Defeat, was released in March 2022. The band described the album as "the first emanation of the third era of Deathspell Omega".

== History ==
Deathspell Omega produced traditional black metal akin to Darkthrone's Transilvanian Hunger. However, their 2004 release, Si monvmentvm reqvires, circvmspice, changed to a technical, experimental, and well-recorded sound with musical influences including Russian Orthodox chanting and choral music.

The band's work after Si monvmentvm reqvires, circvmspice was experimental and technical, with their output in 2005 – Kénôse, "Mass Grave Aesthetics" and "Diabolus absconditus" – totaling nearly eighty minutes in length, longer than Si monvmentvm reqvires, circvmspice. The second volume of the band's trilogy, Fas – Ite, Maledicti, in Ignem Aeternum, was released on 16 July 2007 outside the United States, and the following day in the United States. The band released another EP in December 2008, Veritas Diaboli Manet in Aeternum: Chaining the Katechon. The final album in the trilogy, Paracletus, was released by Norma Evangelium Diaboli and Season of Mist on 9 November 2010. The band's final work related to the trilogy, the EP Drought, was released on 22 June 2012.

Deathspell Omega's sixth EP, The Synarchy of Molten Bones, was available to download and stream on 31 October 2016 with a physical release on 8 November.

The band's sixth full-length album, The Furnaces of Palingenesia, was released on 24 May 2019. It is presented as a manifesto from a dictator speaking for a political faction referred to as "the Order". It intended to deconstruct authoritarian regimes of the left and the right. The band recorded the album live in a studio using analogue gear, and it was mastered more quietly than most of the band's preceding material, reflecting a shift in production.

Without naming any member directly, the band claimed there was an ideological rift within the band: "A minority of the collective's contributors – shall we say, parts of the second circle – who've been invited to partake because of their incredible talents as musicians are involved with earthly politics, but stand on completely opposite ends of the political spectrum and are therefore irreconcilable political foes. Were it not for dialogue on the grounds of transgressive art, they'd be shooting each other. That tension is what interests us." They stated that the music and lyrics were authored by the "French core of the collective". This clarification was made in the wake of backlash against Deathspell Omega due to their collaboration with Finnish musician Mikko Aspa, who has released National Socialist black metal music under the solo project Clandestine Blaze and has ties to RAC acts.

== Band members ==
There is little to no verifiable information about Deathspell Omega's lineup. They do not have any official website, social media platform or promotional photos, have never performed live and do not list credits in their releases. Early interviews were deeply critical of the black metal scene, and the last interview they agreed to until 2019 was conducted in 2004 by their North American label The Ajna Offensive, with questions and answers sent through the band's exclusive label, Norma Evangelium Diaboli, to preserve their anonymity.

Finnish musician Mikko Aspa is the band's current vocalist since 2002. Hirilorn vocalist Shaxul (Frédéric Sescheboeuf) stated that he was Deathspell Omega's vocalist until 2002, and has gone on record as leaving due to displeasure with the band's shift in themes. In a 2014 interview discussing the most underrated guitarists in metal, Gorguts vocalist Luc Lemay named Christian Bouché as Deathspell Omega's guitarist, also giving his pseudonym Hasjarl.

The band contains a drummer, with a band member confirming that the only recordings to use a drum machine were the first four songs on the debut album Infernal Battles.

=== Current members ===
- Khaos – bass (1998–present)
- Christian Bouché – guitar (1998–present)
- Mikko Aspa – vocals (2002–present)

=== Past members ===
- Yohann Pasquier – drums (1998–1999)
- Frédéric Sescheboeuf – vocals (1998–2002)

== Discography ==
- Infernal Battles (2000)
- Inquisitors of Satan (2002)
- Si monvmentvm reqvires, circvmspice (2004)
- Fas – Ite, Maledicti, in Ignem Aeternum (2007)
- Paracletus (2010)
- The Furnaces of Palingenesia (2019)
- The Long Defeat (2022)

=== Compilation albums ===
- Manifestations 2000–2001 (2008, collection of material originally released on LP on the splits with Moonblood and Mütiilation and the Black Metal Blitzkrieg compilation)
- Manifestations 2002 (2008, eight previously unreleased tracks, initially written for the Crushing the Holy Trinity compilation and a planned split with Cantus Bestiae)

=== EPs ===
- Kénôse (2005)
- Veritas Diaboli Manet in Aeternum: Chaining the Katechon (2008), standalone release of the band's contribution to the split album with S.V.E.S.T.
- Mass Grave Aesthetics (2008), originally released in 2005 on the 'From the Entrails to the Dirt' split.
- Diabolus Absconditus (2011), originally released in 2005 on the 'Crushing the Holy Trinity' split.
- Drought (2012)
- The Synarchy of Molten Bones (2016)

=== Split releases ===
- Clandestine Blaze / Deathspell Omega – Split (2001)
- Sob A Lua Do Bode / Demoniac Vengeance (2001, split LP with Moonblood)
- Split with Mütiilation (2002)
- From the Entrails to the Dirt (Part III) (2005, split LP with Malicious Secrets)
- Crushing the Holy Trinity (Part I: Father) (2005, V/A LP with Stabat Mater, Clandestine Blaze, Musta Surma, Mgła, and Exordium)
- Veritas Diaboli Manet in Aeternum (2008, split EP with S.V.E.S.T.)

=== Demos ===
- Disciples of the Ultimate Void (1999)

=== Compilation appearances ===
- "Black Crushing Sorcery" on Black Metal Blitzkrieg (2001, End All Life Productions)

=== Box sets ===
- Untitled 5LP vinyl box (2009): includes Infernal Battles, Inquisitors of Satan, Manifestations 2000–2001, Manifestations 2002, and the band's side of the split with Clandestine Blaze.
- Untitled 7LP vinyl box (2012): includes Si Monumentum Requires, Circumspice, Kénôse, Diabolus Absconditus, Mass Grave Aesthetics, Fas – Ite, Maledicti, in Ignem Aeternum, Chaining the Katechon, Paracletus, and Drought
