= Death (album) =

Studio album by Teitanblood
- Released: 13 May 2014
- Genre: Death metal; black metal; war metal
- Length: 68:33
- Label: The Ajna Offensive; Norma Evangelium Diaboli
- Producer: J. Félez

Teitanblood chronology
Seven Chalices (2009)	Death (2014)	The Baneful Choir (2019)

Death is the second studio album by Spanish extreme metal band Teitanblood. It was released on 13 May 2014 through The Ajna Offensive and Norma Evangelium Diaboli record labels.

== Critical reception ==
Professional ratings
Review scores
Source	Rating
Pitchfork	7.4/10

Pitchfork critic Kim Kelly described the record as "a complete homage to extremity and regression, yet it pushes boundaries that lesser bands never thought to look for." Kelly further stated: "Teitanblood grimly bring order to chaos, and with Death, have surpassed themselves once more."

Pitchfork's Brandon Stosuy also listed the album as number 19 on his list of "The Best Metal Albums of 2014".

== Track listing ==
1. "Anteinfierno" – 4:57
2. "Sleeping Throats of the Antichrist" – 12:27
3. "Plagues of Forgiveness" – 9:43
4. "Cadaver Synod" – 11:20
5. "Unearthed Veins" – 3:46
6. "Burning in Damnation Fires" – 9:44
7. "Silence of the Great Martyrs" – 16:36

== Personnel ==
Album personnel as adapted from album liner notes.

Teitanblood

- J – drums
- NSK – vocals, guitars, bass

Guest musicians

- Chris Reifert – vocals (6)
- CG Santos – effects, programming

Other personnel

- Holy Poison – design
- Scorn – logo
- TK – cover art
- J. Félez – recording, mixing, mastering, production
