= Veritas Diaboli Manet in Aeternum: Chaining the Katechon =

EP by Deathspell Omega
- Released: 8 December 2008
- Genres: Black metal, avant-garde metal
- Length: 22:12
- Label: Norma Evangelium Diaboli

Deathspell Omega chronology
Fas – Ite, Maledicti, in Ignem Aeternum (2008)	Veritas Diaboli Manet in Aeternum: Chaining the Katechon (2008)	Paracletus (2010)

Professional ratings
Review scores
Source	Rating
About.com	4.5/5 stars
AllMusic	4/5 stars
PopMatters	8/10

Veritas Diaboli Manet in Aeternum: Chaining the Katechon is a 22-minute EP containing a single song, recorded by the French black metal band Deathspell Omega. Chaining the Katechon was released through Norma Evangelium Diaboli on 8 December 2008. The title Veritas Diaboli Manet in Aeternum is a work of two French black metal bands—Deathspell Omega (Chaining the Katechon) and S.V.E.S.T. (Le Diable est ma Raison)—and can be understood as a variation on a same theme, independent yet complementary.

== Concept ==
The word 'Katechon' is a term in New Testament Pauline theology used to describe the one who prevents the rise of the Antichrist and therefore also the Second Coming of Christ for the battle at the end of days. 'Chaining the Katechon' thus refers to chaining the one who restrains the Antichrist so that he can be set free and the end of days brought closer. The Latin portion of the album's title is a distorted quote derived from Psalm 117 and translates to "the truth of the Devil endureth forever." The original line is "veritas domini manet in aeternum" which is rendered in the KJV as "the truth of the LORD endureth for ever". As with much of Deathspell Omega's more recent musical output, the album draws heavily on the philosophy of Georges Bataille, Michel Leiris, and Pierre Klossowski, "and their intentionally blasphemous work that addresses ideas of sovereignty, excess, the links between violence and the sacred, and the immutable but impossible place of God and Satan in the cosmological order." The album's artwork includes the quote 'Summa Divisio', which is Latin for "principal division", a phrase that appears in Daniel Chamier's A Manual of Roman Law. The full quote reads "The principal division of all obligations is into two kinds, for they are either civil or praetorian."

== Track listing ==
No.	Title	Length
1.	"Chaining the Katechon"	22:12
Total length:		22:12
