= Akhlys =

American metal band

Akhlys is an American black metal band. They have released four albums.

Founded in 2009 and playing dark ambient music at the time, it originally consisted of only Naas Alcameth from Nightbringer. Since, he has added additional members.

== Discography ==
- Supplication (2009)
- The Dreaming I (2015)
- Melinoë (2020)
- House of the Black Geminus (2024)
