= Drought (EP) =

EP by Deathspell Omega
- Released: 22 June 2012
- Length: 20:55
- Language: English
- Label: Norma Evangelium Diaboli

Deathspell Omega chronology
Diabolus Absconditus (2011)	Drought (2012)	The Synarchy of Molten Bones (2016)

Drought is an EP by Deathspell Omega. It is the band's first release of new material since their 2010 album Paracletus. It is the final release included in the band's 2012 vinyl box set incorporating the trilogy and related works, suggesting that the band regards it as thematically connected, and can be regarded as an epilogue to the trilogy. The band released the track "Abrasive Swirling Murk" for streaming on 21 May, roughly one month ahead of the EP's release.

== Critical reception ==
Professional ratings
Review scores
Source	Rating
Outburn	8/10
Pitchfork	6.7/10
Spin	8/10 stars

Drought received mostly positive reviews from music critics. MetalSucks wrote that "in 20ish minutes, they create discomfort, obliterate, and even pine a little. They don’t stray far from the center, keeping things even more tightly reined in than Paracletus. But while that may seem like creative fatigue or ennui the first time through, after a while, Drought reveals itself to be so tightly packed that most of the details fly by you. But they’re there, destined to be dissembled." Pitchfork were more critical, writing that "the six parts themselves are good, but they're pieced together clumsily. The lengthy instrumentals that serve as bookends seem simply tacked on, surrounding the other four tracks rather than frame them."

== Track listing ==
No.	Title	Length
1.	"Salowe Vision"	3:41
2.	"Fiery Serpents"	4:15
3.	"Scorpions & Drought"	3:11
4.	"Sand"	1:36
5.	"Abrasive Swirling Murk"	3:47
6.	"The Crackled Book of Life"	4:25
Total length:		20:55
