= The Accursed Share =

1949 book by Georges Bataille

The Accursed Share: An Essay on General Economy
- Cover of the first edition
- Author: Georges Bataille
- Original title: La Part maudite
- Translator: Robert Hurley
- Language: French
- Subject: Political economy
- Publisher: Les Éditions de Minuit, Zone Books
- Publication date: 1949
- Publication place: France
- English publication date: 1988
- Media type: Print (Hardcover and Paperback)
- Pages: 197 (Zone Books edition, vol. 1); 460 (Zone Books edition, vols. 2 and 3)
- ISBN: 0-942299-11-6 (Zone Books edition, vol. 1); 0-942299-21-3 (Zone Books edition, vols. 2 and 3)

The Accursed Share: An Essay on General Economy (French: La Part maudite) is a 1949 book about political economy by the French intellectual Georges Bataille, in which the author presents a new economic theory which he calls "general economy". The work comprises Volume I: Consumption, Volume II: The History of Eroticism, and Volume III: Sovereignty. It was first published in France by Les Éditions de Minuit, and in the United States by Zone Books. It is considered one of the most important of Bataille's books.

== Summary ==
The Accursed Share comprises Volume I: Consumption, Volume II: The History of Eroticism, and Volume III: Sovereignty. The work's subject is political economy. Bataille presents a new economic theory which he calls "general economy," as distinct from the "restricted" economic perspective of most economic theory.

According to Bataille's theory of consumption, the accursed share is that excessive and non-recuperable part of any economy which must either be spent luxuriously and knowingly in the arts, in non-procreative sexuality, in spectacles and sumptuous monuments, or it is obliviously destined to an outrageous and catastrophic outpouring, in the contemporary age most often in war, or in former ages as destructive and ruinous acts of giving or sacrifice, but always in a manner that threatens the prevailing system.

The notion of "excess" energy is central to Bataille's thinking. Bataille's inquiry takes the superabundance of energy, beginning from the outpouring of solar energy or the surpluses produced by life's basic chemical reactions, as the norm for organisms. In other words, an organism in Bataille's general economy, unlike the rational actors of classical economy who are motivated by scarcity, normally has an "excess" of energy available to it. This extra energy can be used productively for the organism's growth or it can be lavishly expended. Bataille insists that an organism's growth or expansion always runs up against limits and becomes impossible. The wasting of this energy is "luxury". The form and role luxury assumes in a society are characteristic of that society. "The accursed share" refers to this excess, destined for waste.

Crucial to the formulation of the theory was Bataille's reflection upon the phenomenon of potlatch. It is influenced by the sociologist Marcel Mauss's The Gift (1925), as well as by the philosopher Friedrich Nietzsche's On the Genealogy of Morality (1887).

In Volume I, Bataille introduces the theory and provides historical examples of the functioning of general economy: human sacrifice in Aztec society, the monastic institutions of Tibetan Lamaism, the Marshall Plan, and many others. In Volumes II and III Bataille extends the argument to eroticism and sovereignty, respectively.

== Publication history ==
The Accursed Share was first published by Les Éditions de Minuit in February 1949. Volume II: The History of Eroticism, and Volume III: Sovereignty, were originally published as volume 8 of Bataille's Oeuvres Complètes by Éditions Gallimard in 1976. In 1988, Zone Books published the book in an English translation by Robert Hurley.

== Reception ==
The Accursed Share influenced French philosophers and intellectuals such as Jean-Paul Sartre, Gilles Deleuze, Félix Guattari, and René Girard. In the first volume of the Critique of Dialectical Reason (1960), Sartre credited Bataille with interesting insights into the way extravagance can become an "economic function". Deleuze and Guattari drew on The Accursed Share in Anti-Oedipus (1972). Bataille's ideas also influenced Girard's Violence and the Sacred (1972).

The Accursed Share received a positive review from Keith Thompson in Utne Reader and mixed reviews from David Gordon in Library Journal and the philosopher Alexander Nehamas in The New Republic. Gordon wrote that Bataille offered "a new theory of civilization", but one that "appears more valuable as a framework for his dazzling literary skills than a contribution to knowledge." Gordon concluded that The Accursed Share was probably "of greater interest to students of French literature than to economists or historians". Nehamas found much of the book "profound and scintillating" and described Bataille's prose as "always elegant, even at its most abstract and theoretical", but nevertheless concluded that Bataille's views were "too obscure and speculative", and that the work was worth reading "only if the reading is skeptical." The classicist Norman O. Brown credited Bataille with providing "a first sketch" of a necessary "post-Marxist science of political economy" and showing that growth was not "the self-evident destiny of all economic activity". He found Bataille's ideas about economics to have particular relevance following the collapse of communism in 1989.

The author Paul Hegarty argued that Bataille became an "apologist for Stalinism" in the book, doing so despite Bataille's awareness of the brutalities of the Soviet Union.

The philosopher Michel Surya described The Accursed Share as "one of Bataille's most important books", arguing that its ideas were consistent with those Bataille expressed in Inner Experience (1943), despite the apparently mystical character of the latter work. According to Surya, Bataille wanted to profoundly modify or even re-write the book. Surya argued that this showed "the extreme interest and importance Bataille attached during his whole life to critical reflection about sociology and the economy, in a way so essential and so central that one can without risk of error describe this reflection as political." Similarly, the philosopher Joo Heung Lee noted that Bataille considered The Accursed Share his most important work; Lee described the book as Bataille's "most systematic account of the social and economic implications of expenditure."

== See also ==
- Generalized exchange
