= Unearthly Trance =

American sludge metal/doom metal band

- Origin: Long Island, New York, U.S.
- Genres: Sludge metal, doom metal
- Years active: 2000–2012, 2015–present
- Labels: Rise Above, Southern Lord, Relapse
- Spinoff of: Serpentine Path
- Members: Ryan Lipynsky; Darren Verni; Jay Newman
- Past members: Jeremy Curles; Pete McCoil; Aiden Rockwell

Unearthly Trance is an American sludge metal/doom metal trio from Long Island composed of guitarist-vocalist Ryan Lipynsky, bassist Jay Newman, and drummer Darren Verni. They were formed in 2000 and have released material on leading labels of the genre like Southern Lord, Rise Above Records and Relapse Records to which they are still signed today. They are also considered by critics one of the leading acts in the doom metal scene and shared tours with notable bands such as Sunn O))), Pelican, Electric Wizard, The Melvins and Morbid Angel. Their fifth album, V, was released by Relapse Records on September 27, 2011, and was produced by Sanford Parker, leader of fellow Relapse label mates and post-metal experimentalists Minsk. Ryan Lipynsky also fronts the black metal act the Howling Wind and experimental hardcore unit Pollution. All three members played in Serpentine Path with Tim Bagshaw, formerly of Electric Wizard and Ramesses.

Unearthly Trance broke up on July 6, 2012. The band announced their reunion in spring 2015. They headed back to the studio and released Stalking The Ghost in 2017, followed by an EU tour with Suma.

== Musical style ==
Although categorised as doom metal, Unearthly Trance's music draws inspiration from other forms of extreme music, such as black metal, death metal, crust punk and drone music. Their songs are usually quite long, past the five-minute mark and build slowly and oppressively with pounding drums and slow, loud and distorted guitars and bass buried under thick layers of feedback. The vocals are usually very harsh under the form of distorted screams, and the lyrics usually deal with themes of the occult. Unearthly Trance also ventures into more experimental sounds from time to time like ambient and noise music, giving their music a more introspective, dark and progressive vibe.

== Discography ==
Studio albums

- Season of Seance, Science of Silence (2003)
- In the Red (2004)
- The Trident (2006)
- Electrocution (2008)
- V (2010)
- Stalking the Ghost (2017)

Extended plays

- Lord Humanless Awakens/Summoning the Beast 7-inch ( Southern Lord 2001)
- V.V.V.V./Frost Walk with Me 7-inch (Parasitic Rec 2003)
- The Axis Is Shifting 10-inch (Banana Hammock 2007)
- Eleven Are the Voices 10-inch (Land O'Smiles 2007)
- Psychological Operations (split 10-inch with Suma) (Speakerphone Recordings, Grimmgrinner records 2008)
- Night Of The Vampire b/w Stand For The Fire Demon (split 7-inch with Minsk on Parasitic Rec) (2009)
- Sabbath Of Spirals b/w The Glorious Dead (split 10-inch with Ramesses on Future Noise Rec) (2009)
- Obscene Truth & Headless/Heartless b/w Sorceries of Plague (split 7-inch with Aldebaran on Parasitic Rec) (2009)
- Eternal Frost b/w Servants Of The Warsmen (split 7-inch with Volition) (Wolfsbane Records 2009)
- Unearthly Trance/The Endless Blockade (split 12-inch with The Endless Blockade) (Chrome Peeler Records 2010)
- Unearthly Trance + Wooden Wand (split /cover from Charles Manson Songbook on Chrome Peeler Records) (2010)
- Unearthly trance & Suma collaboration 12-inch (2010 Throne Rec)
- Unearthly Trance + Fleshpress Split (Throne Rec) (2011)
