= Teitanblood =

Spanish extreme metal band

- Origin: Madrid, Spain
- Genres: Death metal; black metal; war metal
- Years active: 2003–present
- Labels: The Ajna Offensive; Norma Evangelium Diaboli
- Members: J.; N. S. K.; Javi Bastard; CG Santos
- Past members: Tyrant Spear Carrier of Barbaric Blood Sacrifice; Juan Carlos Deus

Teitanblood is a Spanish extreme metal band formed in 2003. Based in Madrid, it currently consists of NSK (vocals, guitar, bass) and J (drums). The band released its debut album, Seven Chalices, in 2009. Its follow-up, Death, was released in May 2014 via The Ajna Offensive and Norma Evangelium Diaboli record labels. The latter record was included on Decibel magazine's list of "Top 40 Albums of 2014" as number 26.

== Musical style ==
Teitanblood's music is generally labeled as death metal and black metal. The band's debut was described by BrooklynVegan as "the most discordant, destructive, and ultimately unfucwitable blackened death in a long time", and their follow-up album was labeled by Pitchfork as "a weaponized hybrid of the two genres". The band's music also features influences from bands such as Repulsion, Necrovore, Incantation, Autopsy, as well as thrash metal. The band's logo appears on the cover of Darkthrone's Circle the Wagons album as a form of homage.

== Members ==
Current members

- NSK – bass, guitar, vocals (2003–present)
- J – drums (2005–present)
- Javi Bastard (Javier Félez) – guitar (2017–present)
- CG Santos – effects, programming (2008–present)

Former members

- Tyrant Spear Carrier of Barbaric Blood Sacrifice (Defernos) – drums (2003–2005)
- Juan Carlos Deus – guitar (2003–2009)

== Discography ==
Studio albums

- Seven Chalices (2009)
- Death (2014)
- The Baneful Choir (2019)
- From the Visceral Abyss (2025)

EPs and splits

- Proclamation / Teitanblood (2005)
- Teitanblood / Necros Christos (2006)
- Purging Tongues (2011)
- Woven Black Arteries (2012)
- Accursed Skin (2016)

Compilations

- Black Putrescence of Evil (2009)

Demos

- Genocide Chants to Apolokian Dawn (2004)
