= Clandestine Blaze / Deathspell Omega – Split =

Clandestine Blaze / Deathspell Omega

Compilation album by Clandestine Blaze and Deathspell Omega
- Released: 2005
- Genre: Black metal
- Length: 42:57
- Label: Northern Heritage

Clandestine Blaze / Deathspell Omega – Split is an album released by the black metal bands Clandestine Blaze and Deathspell Omega in 2001.

Chronicles of Chaos rated the album eight out of ten.

== Track listing ==
=== Clandestine Blaze ===
1. "Will to Kill" - 07:47
2. "Blasphemous Lust" - 02:42
3. "Raping the Innocent" - 03:20
4. "Genocide Operation" - 08:21

=== Deathspell Omega ===
1. "Bestial Orgies" - 05:47
2. "The Suicide Curse" - 07:53
3. "Seal of Perversion" - 07:07

== Release information ==
- The CD version was released by Northern Heritage in 2001.
- The LP version was released by Northern Heritage in 2001 and it was limited to 300 copies.
- The CD version was re-released by Northern Heritage in 2003.
