= Si monvmentvm reqvires, circvmspice =

Studio album by Deathspell Omega
- Released: February 2004
- Genres: Black metal, avant-garde metal
- Length: 77:45
- Label: Norma Evangelium Diaboli

Deathspell Omega chronology
Inquisitors of Satan (2003)	Si monvmentvm reqvires, circvmspice (2004)	Kénôse (2005)

Si monvmentvm reqvires, circvmspice is the third full-length album by black metal band Deathspell Omega. The album title is a grammatically mis-quoted version of the Latin epitaph on the tomb of Christopher Wren in St Paul's Cathedral (built by him), meaning "If you seek his monument, look around you". This album is the first part in a trilogy of albums released by the band, followed by Fas – Ite, Maledicti, in Ignem Aeternum in 2007 and Paracletus in 2010. The trilogy has been described as "a theological dispute on the divine essence of the Devil, the roles and virtues of faith and the place of man therein", particularly from a Theistic Satanist perspective. One interpretation of the purpose of the album is to examine and proclaim that "Satan is pervading every part of our material and metaphysical realms and how Man’s relationship with Him should be one of reverence and devotion." The album draws on themes of putrefaction, decomposition, and antinatalism, as well as the work of the French philosopher Georges Bataille.

== Background and artwork ==
The track "Malign Paradigm" is a tribute to the Swedish black metal band Malign, and their track "Ashes and Bloodstench". "Drink the Devil's Blood" is a re-recording of the song of the same name from the band's first album, Infernal Battles, featuring new lyrics with a Eucharistic theme.

The artwork is "both a statement on the Logos, providing metaphysical keys to a certain approach on reality, and a statement on our faith and its concrete anchors and applications in the world as every human being can actually experience it. But keep in mind: the light that illuminates us is the very same that blinds us too." The band notes that the artwork is also linked to a lyric from "Sola Fide I" ("The heart of a lost angel is in the earth"), taken from Elizabeth Barrett Browning's poem "A Drama of Exile", which retells the exile of Adam and Eve from the Garden of Eden and Satan's role in it.

== Musical style and writing ==
Musically, it represents a massive departure in sound from the band's previous work, both for the increase in recording and production quality as well as for the pursuit of far more avant-garde and experimental directions than the band's previous work. The album incorporates Gregorian chants, chaotic moments and significant use of dissonant and atonal riffs and chord structures. The album was also originally intentionally structured in the manner of 1970s double albums, with each LP side opening with a "prayer" (side four, which opens with "Carnal Malefactor", being an arguable exception). The album was inspired by Christian sources (often Catholic), particularly in its metaphysical discussions. The band frequently quote passages from the Christian Bible, for example 'Third Prayer' quotes Chapter 17 of the Book of Jeremiah: "Thus says the LORD, "Cursed is the man who trusts in mankind, and makes flesh his strength, and whose heart turns away from the LORD.""Hétoïmasia" is Greek for "preparation", which references the empty throne awaiting Christ's return.

== Critical reception ==
Professional ratings
Review scores
Source	Rating
AllMusic	3.5/5 stars
Sputnikmusic	3.5/5 stars

In 2013, Decibel ranked Si monvmentvm reqvires, circvmspice, at number 32 on its list of the Top 100 Black Metal Albums of All Time. Loudwire placed it at number 19 on a similar list in 2017. Kerrang! in 2020 called it the second-greatest black metal album of the 21st century.

== Track listing ==
No.	Title	Length
1.	"First Prayer"	5:43
2.	"Sola fide I"	5:14
3.	"Sola fide II"	7:53
4.	"Second Prayer"	4:41
5.	"Blessed Are the Dead Whiche Dye in the Lorde"	5:47
6.	"Hétoïmasia"	7:08
7.	"Third Prayer"	3:57
8.	"Si monvmentvm reqvires, circvmspice"	6:32
9.	"Odivm nostrvm"	4:46
10.	"Jvbilate Deo (O Be Joyfvl in the Lord)"	6:07
11.	"Carnal Malefactor"	11:45
12.	"Drink the Devil's Blood"	4:32
13.	"Malign Paradigm"	3:40
Total length:		77:45

== See also ==
- Hetoimasia
- Sola fide
- Antinatalism
- Georges Bataille
