= Ritual Productions =

London-based independent record label

- Founded: 2010
- Genre: Doom; Stoner Rock; Drone Metal; Psychedelic rock Sludge Metal; Drone
- Country of origin: United Kingdom
- Location: London
- Official website: www.ritualproductions.net/

Ritual Productions is a London-based independent record label launched in 2010.

== Biography ==
On the summer solstice of 2010, Ritual put out their first release, Ramesses' Take the Curse. The album artwork features images by Jake and Dinos Chapman of their work Fucking Hell, from the 2008 "If Hitler Had Been a Hippy How Happy Would We Be" exhibition at London's White Cube Gallery. Additionally, Ramesses have released the following albums on Ritual Productions: Chrome Pineal, Possessed By The Rise Of Magik (with the LP featuring remixes from Justin Broadrick) and re-issues of We Will Lead You to Glorious Times, The Tomb, and Misanthropic Alchemy.

Drone rock band Bong have too released numerous albums with Ritual Productions: We Are, We Were and We Will Have Been, Beyond Ancient Space, Mana-Yood Shushai, Stoner Rock, Thought and Existence and a re-issue of the band’s rare debut S/T, which came with a previously unreleased bonus track.

During 2013, Ritual released Superunnatural by the new psychedelic rock group 11PARANOIAS, followed by Spectralbeastiaries in 2014 and Stealing Fire From Heaven in 2015. The band released their latest full-length, Reliquary For A Dreamed Of World in October 2016. The LP and CD formats for Reliquary For A Dreamed Of World came with a ‘Multi-Dimensional Paranoid Vision Key’ – based on the RGB colour model, a set of three coloured filters reveals different layers to the album artwork. 2019 saw the band release a new album, 'Asterismal', with artwork courtesy of contemporary British artist Toby Ziegler.

2015 saw heavy rock improv duo GHOLD release ‘Of Ruin’ – their debut on Ritual Productions. A second full-length for Ritual Productions, PYR, was released in 2016 and included an expanded line-up with the addition of multi-instrumentalist Oliver Martin.

2016 further saw three new bands, and their subsequent releases, added to the Ritual Productions roster. The Poisoned Glass from Seattle/Atlanta, consisting of Edgy59 and G. Stuart Dahlquist, released their debut album 10 SWORDS; Horse Latitudes from Helsinki released Primal Gnosis – their first on the Ritual Productions label - and NYC's Thralldom released their first music in over a decade, titled Time Will Bend Into Horror, the latter being only available on digital formats.

The New band, Ancient Lights, signed with Ritual Productions in summer 2017. The band is composed of Adam Richardson (11PARANOIAS, Ramesses), Ben Carr (INTRCPTR, 5ive) and Tim Bertilsson (Switchblade). The band met in the early 2000s whilst playing shows together, eventually recording their debut album in North London during 2017.

In 2018, Ritual Productions announced the signing of Drug Cult, a four-piece occultist doom collective hailing from Mullumbimby, Australia. The band's debut rite was released in June 2018.

2019 saw the label re-release Brazilian band Basalt's debut album, 'O Coração Negro da Terra' on digital formats. The album has been exclusively remastered by labelmate Adam Richardson (11PARANOIAS, Ancient Lights, Ramesses).

Ritual Productions further released the album by Italian psychedelic black/doom metal trio,'Salbrox' in May 2019.

In collaboration with Diagonal Records, Ritual Productions released electronic noise artist Viviankrist's 2019 LP 'Cross Modulation'.

2020 saw Ritual Productions release Basalt's new album, 'Silêncio Como Respiração', their first full-length for the label. The year further included the release of Viviankrist's 'Cross Modulation - Bootleg Remixes' and a cassette tape boxset comprising four Viviankrist albums; 'Live in Studio 2018', 'Pop Incentive', 'Heavy Sleep' and 'Alabaster White'.

To date, 5 Ritual Productions artists have appeared at the Roadburn Festival in Tilburg, Netherlands.

== Artists ==
- 11PARANOIAS
- Ancient Lights
- Basalt
- Bong
- Drug Cult
- Ghold
- Horse Latitudes
- Nibiru
- Ramesses
- The Poisoned Glass
- Thralldom
- Viviankrist

== Discography ==
=== Complete 12", CD & digital releases ===
- RITE001CD: Ramesses - 'Take the Curse' CD
- RITE002DL: Ramesses - 'Take the Curse' Digital Download
- RITE003DL: Ramesses - 'We Will Lead You to Glorious Times' Digital Download
- RITE004DL: Ramesses - 'The Tomb' Digital Download
- RITE005DL: Ramesses - 'Misanthropic Alchemy' Digital Download
- RITE006CD: Bong - 'Beyond Ancient Space' CD
- RITE007DL: Bong - 'Beyond Ancient Space' Digital Download
- RITE008LP: Ramesses - 'Chrome Pineal' LP
- RITE009DL: Ramesses - 'Chrome Pineal' Digital Download
- RITE010CD: Ramesses - 'Possessed by The Rise of Magik' CD
- RITE011DL: Ramesses - 'Possessed by the Rise of Magik' Digital Download
- RITE012LP: Ramesses - 'Possessed By The Rise of Magik' double LP
- RITE013LP: Ramesses - 'Take the Curse' double LP
- RITE014LP: Ramesses - 'Misanthropic Alchemy' double 12" LP + bonus material
- RITE015CD Ramesses - 'Misanthropic Alchemy' double CD + bonus material
- RITE016CD: Bong - 'Mana Yood Sushai' CD
- RITE017DL: Bong - 'Mana Yood Susha' Digital Download
- RITE018CD: Bong - 'S/T' CD
- RITE019DL: Bong - 'S/T' Digital Download
- RITE020LP: Bong - 'Mana-Yood-Sushai' LP - second pressing on coloured vinyl
- RITE021LP: 11PARANOIAS - 'Superunnatural' 12" LP
- RITE022CD:11PARANOIAS - 'Superunnatural' Digital Download
- RITE023CD: 11PARANOIAS - 'Superunnatural' CD + bonus material - with deluxe full colour double sided PVC sleeve
- RITE024LP: Bong - 'Stoner Rock' double LP
- RITE025CD: Bong - 'Stoner Rock' CD
- RITE026DL: Bong - 'Stoner Rock' Digital Download
- RITE027LP: Bong - 'Beyond Ancient Space' double LP - uncut, remixed, remastered specially for vinyl
- RITE028LP: 11PARANOIAS - 'Spectralbeastiaries' 12" LP
- RITE029DL: 11PARANOIAS - 'Spectralbeastiaries' Digital Download
- RITE030CD - 11PARANOIAS 'Stealing Fire From Heaven' CD
- RITE031LP - 11PARANOIAS 'Stealing Fire From Heaven' LP
- RITE032DD - 11PARANOIAS 'Stealing Fire From Heaven' Digital Download
- RITE033CD - Ghold 'Of Ruin' CD
- RITE034LP - Ghold 'Of Ruin' LP
- RITE035DD - Ghold 'Of Ruin' Digital Download
- RITE036CD - Bong 'We are, we were and we will have been' CD
- RITE037LP - Bong 'We are, we were and we will have been' LP
- RITE038DD - Bong 'We are, we were and we will have been' Digital Download
- RITE039LP - 11PARANOIAS 'Reliquary For A Dreamed Of World' LP - with MPV Key
- RITE040CD - 11PARANOIAS 'Reliquary For A Dreamed Of World' CD - with MPV Key, bonus material and additional artwork
- RITE041DD - 11PARANOIAS 'Reliquary For A Dreamed Of World' Digital Download
- RITE042LP - Ghold 'PYR' LP
- RITE043CD - Ghold 'PYR' CD - with bonus track
- RITE044DD - Ghold 'PYR' Digital Download
- RITE045LP - The Poisoned Glass '10 Swords' LP
- RITE046CD - The Poisoned Glass '10 Swords' CD - with bonus track
- RITE047DD - The Poisoned Glass '10 Swords' Digital Download
- RITE048LP - Horse Latitudes 'Primal Gnosis' Double LP
- RITE049CD - Horse Latitudes 'Primal Gnosis' CD
- RITE050DD - Horse Latitudes 'Primals Gnosis' Digital Download
- RITE051DD - Thralldom - 'Time Will Bend Into Horror' Digital Download
- RITE052LP - Bong ‘Thought and Existence’ LP
- RITE053CD - Bong ‘Thought and Existence’ CD
- RITE053CDLE - Bong ‘Thought and Existence’ Limited Edition CD
- RITE054DD - Bong ‘Thought and Existence’ Digital Download
- RITE055LP - Ancient Lights ‘Ancient Lights’ Double LP
- RITE056CD - Ancient Lights ‘Ancient Lights’ CD
- RITE056CDLE - Ancient Lights ‘Ancient Lights’ Limited Edition CD
- RITE057DD - Ancient Lights ‘Ancient Lights’ Digital Download
- RITE058LP - Drug Cult ‘Drug Cult’ LP
- RITE059CD - Drug Cult ‘Drug Cult’ CD
- RITE059CDLE - Drug Cult ‘Drug Cult’ Limited Edition CD
- RITE060DD - Drug Cult ‘Drug Cult’ Digital Download
- RITE061LP - 11PARANOIAS ‘Asterismal’ LP
- RITE062CD - 11PARANOIAS ‘ Asterismal’ CD
- RITE062CDLE - 11PARANOIAS ‘ Asterismal’ Limited Edition CD
- RITE063DD - 11PARANOIAS ‘ Asterismal’ Digital Download
- RITE064LP - Nibiru ’Salbrox’ LP
- RITE065CD - Nibiru ‘Salbrox’ CD
- RITE066DD - Nibiru ‘Salbrox’ DD
- RITE067LP - Basalt ‘Silêncio Como Respiração’ LP
- RITE068CD - Basalt ‘Silêncio Como Respiração’ CD
- RITE069DD - Basalt ‘Silêncio Como Respiração’ Digital Download
- RITE70DD - Basalt ‘O Coração Negro da Terra’ Digital Download
- RITE071LP - Viviankrist ‘Cross Modulation - Bootleg Remixes’ LP
- RITE071LPLE - Viviankrist ‘Cross Modulation - Bootleg Remixes’ Limited Edition LP
- RITE072CD - Viviankrist ‘Cross Modulation - Bootleg Remixes’ CD
- RITE072CDLE - Viviankrist ‘Cross Modulation - Bootleg Remixes’ Limited Edition CD
- RITE073DD - Viviankrist ‘Cross Modulation - Bootleg Remixes’ Digital Download
- RITE074CS - Viviankrist ‘Live in Studio 2018’ Cassette Tape
- RITE075DD - Viviankrist ‘Live in Studio 2018’ Digital Download
- RITE076CS - Viviankrist ‘Pop Incentive’ Cassette Tape
- RITE077DD - Viviankrist ‘Pop Incentive’ Digital Download
- RITE078CS - Viviankrist ‘Heavy Sleep’ Cassette Tape
- RITE079DD - Viviankrist ‘Heavy Sleep’ Digital Download
- RITE080CS - Viviankrist ‘Alabaster White’ Cassette Tape
- RITE081DD - Viviankrist ‘Alabaster White’ Digital Download
- RITE082CSB - Viviankrist Cassette Boxset

== See also ==
- Doom metal
- Drone metal
- List of record labels
- List of independent UK record labels
