= Ramesses (band) =

British extreme metal band

- Origin: Dorset, England
- Genres: Doom metal; sludge metal; black metal
- Years active: 2003–2013, 2016–2021
- Labels: Feto, Ritual Productions
- Members: Adam Richardson; Mark Greening; Alex Hamilton
- Past members: Tim Bagshaw
- Website: ramss.info

Ramesses were a British extreme metal band from Dorset, initially featuring former members of Electric Wizard.

== History ==
Ramesses was formed in February 2003 by Tim Bagshaw and Mark Greening (ex-Electric Wizard) with Adam Richardson formerly of Lord of Putrefaction, Spirmyard, and Hexed. Their second album titled Take the Curse was released in 2010.

In 2011, the band released their 3rd full-length album Possessed By the Rise of Magick. They shortly followed it up with the studio/live EP Chrome Pineal, which featured three new studio tracks and three live tracks recorded in 2007.

In 2012, it was announced that Bagshaw had left the band. He had moved from England to the United States and formed the sludge / doom metal band A Serpentine Path with all 3 members of the band Unearthly Trance. Mike Vest of the band Bong filed in on guitar for live performances.

On 29 January 2013, on their official website, the band announced a "hibernation". It had also been stated on Greening's Facebook page that he had quit the band in October 2012 to rejoin a previous band, which was later revealed to be Electric Wizard. Adam Richardson is working on a new project entitled 11Paranoias with Vest. Greening was also a previous member of that project.

On 9 February 2016 Ramesses announced the end of their hibernation.

== Discography ==
=== Studio ===
- Misanthropic Alchemy (2007)
- Take the Curse (2010)
- Possessed By the Rise of Magick (2011)

=== EPs/Demos ===
- Promo 2003 (Demo, 2003)
- Negative Reaction/Ramesses Split (Split, 2004)
- We Will Lead You to Glorious Times (EP, 2005)
- The Tomb (Demo, 2005)
- "Lack of Almost Everything" cover of an Eyehategod song on the tribute album For the Sick (Song, 2007)
- Unearthly Trance/Ramesses split (10" Split, 2009)
- Baptism of the Walking Dead (EP, 2009)
- Chrome Pineal (2011)

=== Singles ===
- Ramesses (Single, 2004)

== Members ==
Current members

- Adam Richardson – lead vocals, bass (2003–present)
- Mark Greening – drums (2003–present)
- Alex Hamilton – guitar (2016–present)

Former members

- Tim Bagshaw – guitars, backing vocals (2003–2012)

Touring musicians

- Mike Vest – guitar (2012)
