= L'Abbé C =

1950 novella by Georges Bataille

- The French edition
- Author: Georges Bataille
- Language: French
- Published: 1950
- Publication place: France
- Media type: Print
- ISBN: 0-7145-2848-X

L'Abbé C (1950) was Georges Bataille's first published novella. It is a work of dark eroticism, centred on the relationship between two twentieth-century brothers in a small French village, one of whom is a Catholic parish priest, while the other is a libertine. It explores issues of split subjectivity and existentialist bad faith.

== Plot summary ==
The novella centres on the antagonisms that exist between two brothers. It recounts the story of Robert, a priest whose conduct appears so exemplary that he is called "L'Abbé" ("the abbot"), and is also involved in the clandestine activities of the French Resistance. Against his perspective of ecclesiastical morality, one encounters his twin brother Charles, who is a "libertine". It is the Second World War, which serves as a backdrop for the paradox of interpersonal betrayal, anti-clericalism and its disconnection from public virtue that characterises this work.

Charles has a sexual relationship with Éponine, a female libertine. However, Éponine is also attracted to Robert. Worse, Robert is secretly attracted to Éponine, which precipitates an atmosphere of psychological and sexual tension within this triangle. The story turns out badly for all involved, as the resolution of this unstable triangle is not a healthy outcome. The story is told mostly from Charles's point of view.

Robert undergoes a nervous breakdown, as he faints at a church service that he officiates at, with Éponine in the congregation. Robert becomes an alcoholic, and starts to harass Éponine at home late at night, leaving behind traces that suggest growing psychological instability. He loses his moral compass, and eventually becomes insane, leaving his village for a hotel on its outskirts, and spends a fortnight with two prostitutes, Rosie and Raymonde, before the Gestapo apprehend Robert for his activities with the French Resistance. While he has abandoned his clerical vows, however, Robert will not betray his resistance colleagues, and dies an heroic death after severe torture at the hands of his Nazi captors.

Charles mourns his death, unable to forget what happened to his brother, until he and his wife Germaine encounter the unnamed narrator of the bracketing sections of this work, read as if an autobiography. Two years after Robert's heroic death, Charles commits suicide, but the narrator fulfils his responsibilities and takes the work to a publisher.

== Structure ==
=== Part One: Editor's Preface ===
The unnamed narrator sets the scene of two brothers, and tells the story of the last time he saw Charles, his demand of him to publish the memoirs, and the narrator's entry into psychotherapy.

=== Part Two: The Narrative Written by Charles C... ===
Made up of eighteen chapters, this tells the story of the events leading up to Robert's breakdown from Charles' point of view.

=== Part Three: Epilogue to The Narrative Written by Charles C... ===
The aftermath of the breakdown, including his last visit to Charles fortnight with the prostitutes.

=== Part Four: Robert's Notes: Foreword by Charles C..., The Diary of Chianine, Conscience ===
Robert's diary of the affair with the prostitutes, starting with Charles' thoughts on them.

=== Part Five: The Editor's Postscript ===
Recounts a conversation after the war between Charles and the narrator about a conversation Charles had had with a Calvinist monk who had been in the same prison cell as Robert.

== Bibliography ==
- Georges Bataille: L'Abbé C. London: Marion Boyars. 2001. ISBN 0-7145-2848-X.
