= Weapon (band) =

- Origin: Calgary/Edmonton, Alberta, Canada
- Genres: Black metal, death metal
- Years active: 2003–2013
- Labels: Relapse, The Ajna Offensive, Agonia Records, Full Moon Productions
- Website: store.relapse.com/band/weapon

Weapon was a Canadian black/death metal band formed by frontman Vetis Monarch in Calgary, Alberta in 2003.

== History ==
After the formation of the band, Vetis temporarily moved to his birthplace of Dhaka, Bangladesh to record the Within the Flesh of the Satanist demo tape and the Violated Hejab EP. He moved back to Canada in 2005 and relocated Weapon to Edmonton. Weapon signed with Relapse Records in 2011 and released their label debut, Embers and Revelations, in 2012. Subsequently, Weapon toured North America with Marduk and 1349 beginning in May 2012.

Weapon and an older British band of the same name came to a legal agreement that the latter band would add "UK" to their band name in October 2012. Weapon stated on its official Facebook page that they own the US, Canadian, and UK trademarks on the name, leading the UK band to change their moniker.

According to frontman Vetis Monarch, Weapon's lawyer Eric Greif worked out their recording deal with Relapse Records and settled the legal dispute over the band name.

The band announced on June 28, 2013 that they had broken up. Vetis Monarch said that he feels that further Weapon albums "would only be a black/death metal record by the numbers", which he felt would be stagnation.

== Band members ==
=== Final line-up ===
- Vetis Monarch – guitar, vocals, bass (2003–2013)
- The Disciple – drums (2008–2013)
- Kha Tumos – bass (2009–2013)
- Rom Surtr – guitar (2011–2013)

=== Former ===
- Nohttzver – drums (2004–2005)
- Kapalyq – bass (2005)
- Menschenfiend – guitar (2007–2008)
- Arcan of Death – drums (2007–2008)
- Agni Nethra – bass (2008)
- Sabazios Diabolus – bass (2008–2009)
- Vileblood Dahcnial – guitar (2009)
- Apostle VIII – guitar (2009–2011)

== Discography ==
- Within the Flesh of the Satanist (demo, 2004)
- Violated Hejab (EP, 2005)
- Para Bhakti... Salvation (EP, 2008)
- Drakonian Paradigm (LP, 2009)
- From the Devil's Tomb (LP, 2010)
- Embers and Revelations (LP, 2012)
- Naga: Daemonum Praeteritum (compilation, 2013)
