= Infernal Battles =

Studio album by Deathspell Omega
- Released: June 20, 2000
- Recorded: 2000
- Genre: Black metal
- Length: 38:48
- Label: Northern Heritage

Deathspell Omega chronology
Infernal Battles (2000)	Inquisitors of Satan (2002)

Alternative cover
- 2010 reissue

Infernal Battles is the first album by the black metal band Deathspell Omega. It was released in 2000 by Northern Heritage Records in a limited run of 200 vinyl copies, then re-released in 2003 by the same label and in 2010 by End All Life Productions, both times on CD.

"Drink the Devil's Blood" was later reworked and re-recorded for their 2004 album Si monvmentvm reqvires, circvmspice. The album's second side, with tracks 5–8, is a full reissue of the band's demo Disciples of the Ultimate Void.

The band note in a 2019 interview that the only songs on which they had ever used a drum machine were the first four tracks of Infernal Battles. The last four, being a re-release of their demo, featured their original drummer.

== Track listing ==
No.	Title	Length
1.	"The Victory of Impurity"	5:02
2.	"Drink the Devil's Blood"	4:22
3.	"Extinction of the Weak"	5:27
4.	"Sacrilegious Terror"	4:56
5.	"Raping Human Dignity"	4:20
6.	"The Ancient Presence Revealed"	5:39
7.	"Knowledge of the Ultimate Void"	4:42
8.	"Death's Reign (Human Futility)"	4:20
Total length:		38:48
