= Thy Darkened Shade =

Greek metal band

Thy Darkened Shade is a Greek black metal band. They have released three albums, all through the label World Terror Committee.

== Discography ==
Albums

- Eternvs Mos, Nex Ritvs (2012)
- Liber Lvcifer I: Khem Sedjet (2014)
- Liber Lvcifer II: Mahapralaya (2023)

Splits

- with Abigor, Nightbringer and Mortuus (2017)
- SAATET - TA APEP with Chaos Invocation (2017)
- SamaeLilith: A Conjunction of the Fireborn with Amestigon, Shaarimoth and Inconcessus Lux Lucis (2021)
