= Blue of Noon =

Book by Georges Bataille

- Cover of the first edition
- Author: Georges Bataille
- Original title: Le Bleu du Ciel
- Translator: Harry Mathews
- Language: French
- Genre: Erotic literature; Historical fiction
- Publisher: Jean-Jacques Pauvert
- Publication date: 1957
- Publication place: France
- English publication date: 1978
- Media type: Print
- Pages: 155
- ISBN: 9780893960049
- OCLC: 4655848
- Dewey Decimal: 843.912
- Preceded by: Manet
- Followed by: La littérature et le Mal

Blue of Noon (French: Le Bleu du Ciel) is an erotic novella by Georges Bataille. Although Bataille completed the work in 1935, it was not published until Jean-Jacques Pauvert did so in 1957. (Pauvert previously published the writings of the Marquis de Sade.) Urizen Books published Harry Mathews' English-language translation in 1978. The book deals with necrophilia.

== Plot summary ==
Henri Troppmann goes from his sick-bed in Paris to Barcelona before the Spanish Civil War in time to witness a Catalan general strike. He is torn between three different women, all of whom arrive in the city at that time. One of them, Lazare, is a Marxist Jew and political activist, who is preparing herself for prospective torture and martyrdom at the hand of General Francisco Franco's troops if she is captured. "Dirty" (or Dorothea) is an incontinent, unkempt alcoholic who repeatedly has sex with Troppmann. Xénie is a young woman who had previously nursed him to health during his violent fever in Paris.

The novel is introduced by a scene of extreme degeneracy in a London hotel room, followed by the narrator's description of a dreamlike encounter with "the Commendatore" (English: "the Commander"), who in the Don Juan myth is the father of one of Don Juan's victims, and whose statue returns at the end of the story to drag Don Juan down to hell for his sins. Troppmann has to choose between the abject Dirty and her associations of sex, disease, excrement and decay; the politically engaged Lazare and her ethical values of commitment, resistance and endurance; and Xénie, who has outlived her usefulness. While looking at Lazare beneath a tree, Troppmann realises that he respects her for her social conscience, but also sees her as a rat, and chooses Dirty instead, whilst sending Xénie off with a friend, who is subsequently killed in the street. He travels with Dirty to Trier, the hometown of Karl Marx, where the two copulate in the mud on a cliff overlooking a candle-lit graveyard. They see a Hitler Youth group, lending Dirty a vision of the war to come and their probable deaths. Troppmann leaves her to return to Paris.

== Characters ==
- Henri Troppmann: the protagonist. The novel is entirely written from his first-person perspective.
- Dirty, or Dorothea: mistress of Troppmann.
- Xénie: mistress of Troppmann.
- Lazare: Marxist, Jew, and revolutionary communist. Her writings are far from "the official Communism of Moscow".
- Monsieur Melou: Lazare's father, Marxist, Jew, and political activist for communism. He believes that the revolution and the proletariats are doomed, but still acts according to what he believes to be morally right.
- Michel: revolutionary. Killed during the Barcelona uprising.
- Edith: wife of Troppmann. Lives in Brighton with children. She is only mentioned by name a few times.
- Antonio: revolutionary, mechanic.

== In popular culture ==
The book can be seen briefly in the music video of French singer Alain Bashung's song "Résidents de la République".

== Bibliography ==
- Georges Bataille: Le Bleu du Ciel: Roman: Paris: J.Pauvert: 1957.
- Georges Bataille: Blue of Noon: London: Penguin: 2001: ISBN 978-0-14-118409-8
