= Saturnalia Temple =

Swedish metal band

Saturnalia Temple is a Swedish stoner/doom metal band. They have released four albums, three of which on Listenable Records.

They won the award for best hard rock band at Manifestgalan 2016.

== Discography ==
Albums

- Aion of Drakon (2011)
- To the Other (2015)
- Gravity (2020)
- Paradigm Call (2024)

EPs and splits

- Saturnalia Temple (EP, 2009)
- Impossibilum (EP, 2013)
- On the Powers of the Sphinx with Nightbringer, Nihil Nocturne, and Aluk Todolo (2010)
