= Malokarpatan =

Slovak metal band

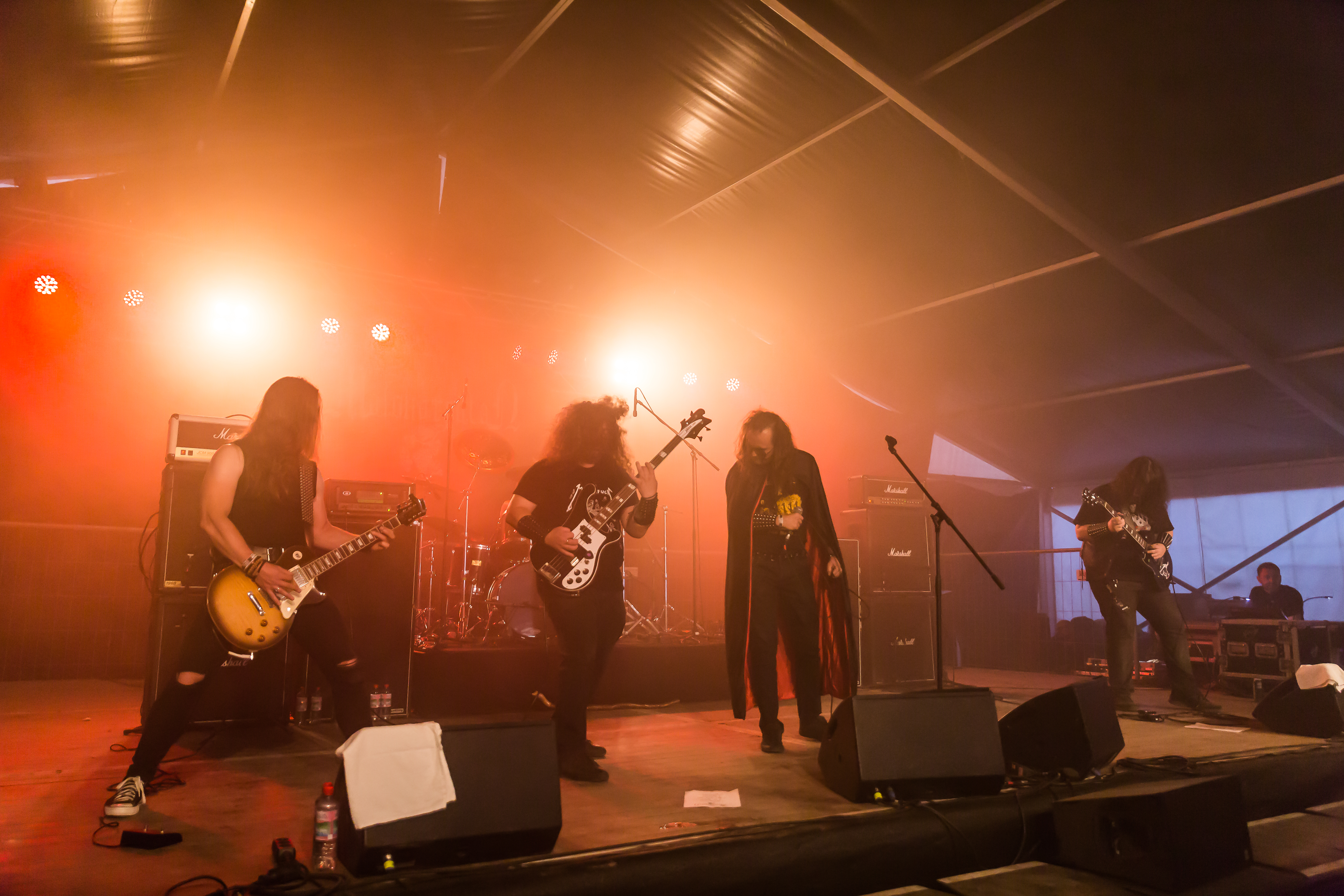

Background information
- Origin: Bratislava, Slovakia
- Genres: Black metal; Heavy metal
- Years active: 2014–present
- Labels: The Ajna Offensive; Invictus Productions; Hexencave Productions
- Members: HV (Vladimír Moravčík); As (Adam Sičák); Aldaron (Juraj Štefanec); Peter (Peter Szentpéteri); Miroslav (Miroslav Švacho)
- Website: https://malokarpatan.bandcamp.com/

Malokarpatan is a Slovak black metal and heavy metal band from Bratislava, Slovakia, formed in 2014. They have released four full-length albums.

== Style and themes ==
The band style has been described as a mixture between traditional speed metal, progressive rock and the first black metal wave.

Malokarpatan founder As (Adam Sičák), has referred as his greatest influences "the classic 80s metal songwriting and catchiness, the black metal madness and mystery, and the folk psychedelia coming from our local culture"

== Members ==
- HV (Vladimír Moravčík) – vocals
- As (Adam Sičák) – guitars
- Aldaron (Juraj Štefanec) – guitars
- Peter (Peter Szentpéteri) – bass
- Miroslav (Miroslav Švacho) – drums

== Discography ==
=== Studio albums ===
- Stridžie Dni (2015)
- Nordkarpatenland (2017)
- Krupinské Ohne (2020)
- Vertumnus Caesar (2023)
