= Inquisitors of Satan =

Studio album by Deathspell Omega
- Released: 2002
- Genre: Black metal
- Length: 38:09
- Label: Northern Heritage; End All Life Productions

Deathspell Omega chronology
Infernal Battles (2000)	Inquisitors of Satan (2002)	Si monvmentvm reqvires, circvmspice (2004)

Inquisitors of Satan is the second album by the black metal band Deathspell Omega, released in 2002 by Northern Heritage Records.

== Track listing ==
No.	Title	Length
1.	"From Unknown Lands of Desolation"	5:38
2.	"Torture and Death"	4:26
3.	"Desecration Master"	5:42
4.	"Lethal Baptism"	3:49
5.	"Succubus of All Vices"	6:19
6.	"Inquisitors of Satan"	5:42
7.	"Decadence"	6:33
Total length:		38:09
