= John Milfull =

Australian academic (1940–2016)

- Born: John Rowland Milfull; 24 April 1940; Sydney, Australia
- Died: 6 November 2016 (aged 76); Canberra, Australia
- Occupation: Academic
- Writing career
- Notable works: From Baal to Keuner: The "Second Optimism" of Bertolt Brecht; The Attractions of Fascism: Social Psychology and Aesthetics of the "Triumph of the Right"; Why Germany? National Socialist Anti-Semitism and the European Context; Britain in Europe: Prospects for Change

John Milfull (24 April 1940 – 6 November 2016) was an Australian academic, educator and professor. In 1971, he was appointed as professor of German and head of the School of German at the University of New South Wales.

In 1984, he became the dean of arts and social sciences there. He later founded that university's degree program in European studies and founded its Centre for European Studies and in 1986 was appointed as professor emeritus and visiting professor in European studies.

He was a member of the international advisory board for the journal Debatte: Journal of Contemporary Central and Eastern Europe and vice-president of the Contemporary European Studies Association of Australia.

== Early life and education ==
Milfull was born John Rowland Milfull on 24 April 1940 in Sydney. His father was Tom Milfull, who taught mathematics at Sydney Grammar School from 1928 to 1933, at Brisbane Grammar School from 1934 to 1938, and at Sydney Church of England Grammar School in the years from 1939 until 1971. His mother was Marion Milfull née Rowland (born 1905), who was the daughter of Percy Fritz Rowland, the headmaster of Townsville Grammar School in the years from 1905 until 1938, and Jessie Adeline.

After attending the Sydney Church of England Grammar School from which he graduated as dux with Leaving Certificate first class honours in English, Latin and German and several prizes, John Milfull studied arts (German, English and music) at the University of Sydney, graduating with First Class Honours in German in 1961.

He spent a year studying German, English, and music at LMU Munich.

== Career ==
=== University of Sydney ===
Returning to Australia, he worked as lecturer at the University of Sydney from 1963 until 1964 In 1968, he would complete his Ph.D. at that same university.

=== University of New South Wales ===
In 1966, he was appointed as lecturer in German in the Department of German (then part of the School of Western European Languages) at the University of New South Wales. In 1969, he was promoted to Senior Lecturer there and, upon the retirement of Professor Walter Hesse two years later, he became Professor of German (later German Studies), being at that time "one of the youngest professors appointed in Australia". He held this position until 1996.

He quickly set about transforming the School of German into a flourishing community and modernising and broadening the curriculum from a study of German language and literature to also include a study of "history, social sciences and politics, film and media".

In support of that goal, he recruited Gero von Wilpert and in 1976 he convinced the university administration "to 'import' three full-time lecturers from Germany". These were Gerhard Fischer, Bernd Hüppauf and Konrad Kwiet.

Milfull forged a close alliance with the Department of German at Monash University, where similar reforms had been undertaken by Professor Leslie Bodi. In his essay "German Studies at Monash University", Professor Philip Thomson praised Milfull's groundbreaking role:

of the eleven departments of German that then existed in Australian universities, only New South Wales, where John Milfull headed an energetic group, was engaged in the sort of German studies that Monash was committed to, broad-ranging, interdisciplinary and contemporary.

Milfull's innovation soon bore fruit. His School of German Studies, as it was now known, attracted international attention and distinguished scholars from Europe and North America came as visiting professors. Annual interdisciplinary symposia held on alternate occasions by the German departments of the UNSW and Monash University also attracted leading academics from abroad.

In 1979, he was praised by Professor J. M. Ritchie, the chair of German at the University of Sheffield, as one of

the powerful generation of scholars raised in the Sydney school (...) who have already made the wider world of Germanistik aware of the new scholarship coming from Australia with major publications in book form on problems of modern German literature...

In 1980, he gave an invited lecture on "Visibility and Invisibility: Assimilation, Success, and the German-Jewish Paradox" at the Center for Advanced Holocaust Studies in the United States Holocaust Memorial Museum, Washington DC.

In 1984, he was appointed Dean of Arts and Social Sciences at the University of New South Wales, a position he held until 1993.

During this "time of reduced government funding, growing commercialisation of the university sector and dwindling enrolments in 'non-profitable' languages" along with "Australia’s turn towards Asia", he tried to protect the community of teachers, researchers and students that he had built up and to rethink "the structure and goals of the faculty".

Partly as a result of this, in 1984 Milfull established a degree program in European Studies at the University of New South Wales and in 1996 he founded the UNSW's Centre for European Studies, of which he remained the director until his retirement in 2006. He used the centre to bring together diplomats and academics and to promote the "European idea" that in which he fervently believed. He was commended by Professor Frank B. Tipton for these achievements:

John Milfull deserves special mention for his efforts on behalf of German and European studies in Australia, efforts that have provided invaluable opportunities to exchange views with the broadest possible range of international scholars.

In 2006, he was appointed as professor emeritus and visiting professor in European Studies at the University of New South Wales.

=== Other university appointments ===
Apart from his years at University of New South Wales, he acted in 1994 as acting dean at the University of Adelaide and worked in 1995 as a visiting research fellow in the School of European Studies at the University of Sussex.

In 1969, he was invited to the Free University of Berlin as a Humboldt Scholar. He spent periods at Technische Universität Berlin, at the Martin Luther University Halle-Wittenberg and, as a lecturer, at the University of Cambridge.

=== Other appointments ===
From 1996, he was a member of the International Advisory Board for the journal Debatte: Journal of Contemporary Central and Eastern Europe.

In 1997, he was elected vice-president of the Contemporary European Studies Association of Australia.

In 1997, Milfull was appointed Director of the Centre for Intercultural Jewish Studies in Sydney, "a co-operative venture between Macquarie University, the University of New South Wales and the University of Sydney". He delivered the opening speech for this centre on 5 August 1997.

== Research interests ==
Milfull's research interests included the following: "The German-Jewish Experience, Literature and Society in the German Democratic Republic, The Process and Impact of German Unification."

== Personal life and death ==
He was married to Dr. Helen Mary Milfull, who graduated with a Ph.D. from the University of New South Wales in 1975. They had three daughters, Inge, Alison and Cathy.

During his life he maintained his interest in music and participated in concerts playing his flute. He also spoke out periodically on politics and current affairs.

He died in Canberra on 6 November 2016.

== Select bibliography ==
=== Books: As author ===
- From Baal to Keuner. The "Second Optimism" of Bertolt Brecht, Bern and Frankfurt am Main: Peter Lang, 1974.

=== Books: As editor ===
- The Attractions of Fascism: Social Psychology and Aesthetics of the "Triumph of the Right", New York: Berg, 1990; London: Bloomsbury Academic, 1990.
- Why Germany? National Socialist Anti-Semitism and the European Context, Providence: Berg, 1993.
- Britain in Europe: Prospects for Change, Aldershot: Ashgate, 1999.

=== Articles ===
For extensive listings of articles in refereed journals, edited books and edited conference proceedings, see: John Milfull's CV and Recent Essays by John Milfull.

Further articles and online republications of articles:

- "Cosi? Sexual Politics in Mozart's Operas", in: The Habsburg Legacy: National Identity in Historical Perspective, ed. Ritchie Robertson and Edward Timms, Edinburgh University Press, 1994.
- "La géographie poétique des « Elixirs du Diable»", in: Romantisme, No. 4, 1972, 65–75. Available online at: Romantisme, 1972, n°4. «Voyager doit être un travail sérieux.», persee.fr. Retrieved 9 April 2017.
