= Robert Hurley (translator) =

Robert Hurley is a translator who has translated the work of several leading French philosophers into English, including Michel Foucault, Gilles Deleuze and Georges Bataille. For example, he led the team translating selections from Foucault's three-volume Dits et écrits (1954–88).

== Works ==
=== Translations ===
- (with Mark Seem and Helen P. Lane) Gilles Deleuze and Félix Guattari, Anti-Oedipus: Capitalism and Schizophrenia, New York: Viking, 1977
- Pierre Clastres, Society against the State: the leader as servant and the human uses of power among the Indians of the Americas, 1977
- Michel Foucault, The History of Sexuality. Volume 1, 1979
- Jacques Donzelot, The Policing of Families, 1980
- Gilles Deleuze, Spinoza: Practical Philosophy, San Francisco: City Light Books, 1988
- Georges Bataille, The Accursed Share: an Essay on General Economy. Volume 1: Consumption, Zone Books, 1988. ISBN 978-0-942299-10-6
- Georges Bataille, Theory of Religion, Zone Books, 1989
- Georges Bataille, The Accursed Share: an Essay on General Economy. Volume 2: The History of Eroticism, Zone Books, 1993
- Georges Bataille, The Accursed Share: an Essay on General Economy. Volume 3: Sovereignty, Zone Books, 1993
- Michel Foucault, Ethics: Subjectivity and Truth, 2000
- The Invisible Committee, To Our Friends, Semiotext(e), 2015
- The Invisible Committee, Now, Semiotext(e), 2017
- Tiqqun, The Cybernetic Hypothesis, Semiotext(e), 2020

=== Edited works ===
- (with Pierre-Marie beaude) Poétique du Divin, 2001
