= Mortuus =

Swedish band

- Origin: Umeå, Sweden
- Genres: Black metal, death metal
- Years active: 2005–present
- Labels: The Ajna Offensive, World Terror Committee
- Members: Tehôm; M. Hinze; David Ekevärn; Andreas Båtsman

Mortuus are a Swedish black/death metal band.

== History ==
Mortuus recorded their eponymous 7” EP Mortuus which was released by The Ajna Offensive in 2005. The members “decided to put the project to death after the seven-inch was recorded, but a new desire to express ourselves through this medium grew – and thus we ‘re-formed’ the band (even though it never will be a band in the traditional sense)”, as stated in an interview posted by The Ajna Offensive. The interview was followed by the album De contemplanda morte (De reverencie laboribus ac adorationis), "a concept album dealing with Death ascension (from the deeps of the qliphoth to the very heart of Death)", which The Ajna Offensive released in 2007. In 2014 the band released their second album, Grape of the Vine, which similarly to the debut was a concept album but was instead based on the band's experiences with black magic and "the initiatory Occultism on the Left Hand Path", they also started playing live concerts albeit very sporadically with live members David Ekevärn on drums and Andreas Båtsman on guitar. In 2017 the band made a self titled song for an independently released split album in collaboration with Abigor, Nightbringer and Thy Darknened Shade and later that same year the band signed to World Terror Committee who released the band's next split single with Greek black metal band Serpent Noir in 2018, the band's song "Nyctophilia" was originally recorded during the sessions of their second album. The band's third album Diablerie was released on May 13, 2022, through World Terror Committee.

== Discography ==
- Mortuus (7”, The Ajna Offensive 2005)
- De contemplanda morte (De reverencie laboribus ac adorationis) (Full-length, The Ajna Offensive 2007)
- Grape of the Vine (Full-length, The Ajna Offensive 2014)
- split with Abigor, Nightbringer, Thy Darkened Shade (12”, W.T.C. Productions 2017)
- Nyctophilia / Dreaming Iblis split with Serpent Noir (7”, W.T.C. Productions 2018)
- Diablerie (W.T.C. Productions 2022)
