= The Solar Anus =

1931 surrealist text by André Masson

- Author: Georges Bataille
- Original title: L'anus solaire
- Illustrator: André Masson
- Language: French
- Publisher: Éditions de la Galerie Simon
- Publication date: 1931
- OCLC: 8937274

The Solar Anus (French: L'anus solaire) is a short surrealist text by the French writer Georges Bataille, written in 1927 and published with drawings by André Masson in 1931.

Albeit elliptically, its aphorisms refer to decay, death, vegetation, natural disasters, impotence, frustration, ennui and excrement. It makes ironic reference to the sun, which, although it brings life to the Earth, can also result in death from its unrestrained energies. Moreover, the anus may be seen as a symbol of the inevitability of residual waste due to its role in excretion.
