= Clandestine Blaze =

Finnish one-man black metal band

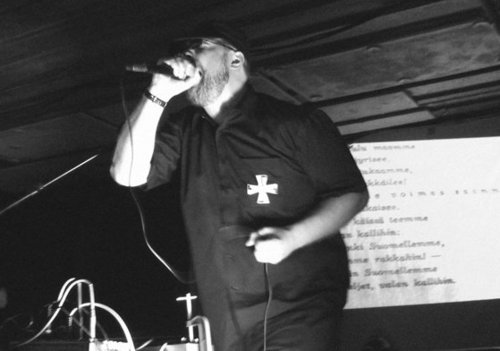
- Aspa performing as Clandestine Blaze in 2000

Background information
- Origin: Lahti, Finland
- Genre: Black metal
- Years active: 1998–present
- Labels: End All Life; Northern Heritage
- Members: Mikko Aspa

Clandestine Blaze is a one-man Finnish black metal band from Lahti, formed in 1998 by Mikko Aspa. Aspa cites Darkthrone, Burzum, Beherit and Bathory as key influences. Aspa is involved in many other projects, such as Stabat Mater, Creamface, Fleshpress, AM, Grunt, Clinic of Torture, Alchemy of the 20th Century, and Nicole 12.

Aspa owns Northern Heritage, a record label that has released albums by Baptism, Mgła, Behexen, Deathspell Omega, Drudkh, Hate Forest, Ildjarn, Peste Noire, and Satanic Warmaster, among others. Aspa also owns CF Productions, which produces the pornographic Erotic Perversion magazines and Public Obscenities videos, and Freak Animal Records, a power electronics / noise label.

Clandestine Blaze performed a few live shows in 2015 and 2016 with a session lineup. Regarding touring, Aspa said, "I won’t even consider any offers beyond the level of Steelfest, which is the best festival I’m currently aware of. I’d prefer small, closed networks completely cut off from the music industry."

Aspa's power electronics project Nicole 12 is controversial for its themes of sexual predation. The cover of the Nicole 12 album Substitute appears to depict a nude photograph of an underage girl. Aspa acknowledged that it is the project's "most controversial" cover, but he claims that the image is actually of a 27-year-old woman heavily distorted so that listeners "feel as if they are doing something wrong."

== Members ==
- Mikko Aspa – all instruments, vocals (1998–present)

=== Live musicians ===
- Michał Stępień – bass (2015–2016)
- Maciej Kowalski – drums (2015–2016)
- Mikołaj Żentara – guitar (2015–2016)
- Piotr Dziemski – guitar (2015–2016)

== Discography ==
=== Demos ===
- Promo '98 (1998)
- There Comes the Day... (Northern Heritage, 2001)
- Below the Surface of Cold Earth (Northern Heritage, 2002)
- Blood and Cum (Northern Heritage, 2002)
- Goat - Creative Alienation (Northern Heritage, 2002)

=== Albums ===
- Fire Burns in Our Hearts (Blackmetal.com / Northern Heritage, 1999)
- Night of the Unholy Flames (Northern Heritage / End All Life, 2000)
- Fist of the Northern Destroyer (Northern Heritage / End All Life, 2002)
- Deliverers of Faith (Northern Heritage, 2004)
- Church of Atrocity (Northern Heritage, 2006)
- Falling Monuments (Northern Heritage, 2010)
- Harmony of Struggle (Northern Heritage, 2013)
- New Golgotha Rising (Northern Heritage, 2015)
- City of Slaughter (Northern Heritage, 2017)
- Tranquility of Death (Northern Heritage, 2018)
- Secrets of Laceration (Northern Heritage, 2021)
- Resacralize the Unknown (Northern Heritage, 2023)
- Consecration Of The Blood (Northern Heritage, 2025)

=== Split albums and EPs ===
- On the Mission EP (Northern Neritage, 1999)
- Split with Deathspell Omega (Northern Heritage, 2001)
- Split with Satanic Warmaster (Northern Heritage, 2004)
- Crushing the Holy Trinity split with Deathspell Omega, Stabat Mater, Musta Surma, Mgła & Exordium (Northern Heritage, 2005)

=== Compilations ===
- Archive Volume 1 (Northern Heritage, 2008)
- Archive Volume 2 (Northern Heritage, 2008)
- Archive Volume 3 (Northern Heritage, 2008)
