= Debatte =

- Discipline: German studies, Eastern European studies
- Language: English
- Edited by: Andrew Kilmister

Publication details
- Former names: Debatte: Review of Contemporary German Affairs; Labour Focus on Eastern Europe
- History: 1993–present
- Publisher: Routledge
- Frequency: Triannually

Standard abbreviations
- ISO 4: Debatte

Indexing
- ISSN: 0965-156X (print); 1469-3712 (web)
- OCLC no.: 65169723

Links
- Journal homepage; Online access; Online archive

Debatte: Journal of Contemporary Central and Eastern Europe is a triannual peer-reviewed academic journal published by Routledge. It was established in 1993 as "Debatte: Review of Contemporary German Affairs" and obtained in current title in 2005, when it merged with Labour Focus on Eastern Europe. The editor-in-chief is Andrew Kilmister (Oxford Brookes University). The journal covers Central and Eastern European studies, with an emphasis on Germany.

The "Labour Focus on Eastern Europe" was established in the 1970s and, as per its "statement of aims", its editorial collective included various trends of socialist and Marxist opinion.
