= Nightbringer =

American metal band

Nightbringer is an American black metal band. They have released five albums, three of which on Season of Mist.

== Discography ==
Albums

- Death and the Black Work (2008, Full Moon Productions)
- Apocalypse Sun (2010, Avantgarde Music)
- Hierophany of the Open Grave (2011, Season of Mist)
- Ego Dominus Tuus (2014, Season of Mist)
- Terra Damnata (2017, Season of Mist)

Splits

- Rex Ex Ordine Throni with Temple of Not (2005)
- with Serpentinam (2006)
- On the Powers of the Sphinx with Nihil Nocturne, Saturnalia Temple and Aluk Todolo (2010)
- The Ruins of Edom with Αχέροντας (2012)
- Circumambulations of the Solar Inferno with Dødsengel (2013)
- with Abigor, Thy Darkened Shade and Mortuus (2017)
