= Inner Experience =

1943 book by Georges Bataille

- Cover of the first edition
- Author: Georges Bataille
- Original title: L'expérience intérieure
- Translator: Leslie Anne Boldt
- Language: French
- Publisher: Éditions Gallimard, State University of New York Press
- Publication date: 1943
- Publication place: France
- English publication date: 1988
- Media type: Print
- Pages: 209 (English edition)
- ISBN: 0-88706-635-6

Inner Experience (French: L'expérience intérieure) is a 1943 book by the French intellectual Georges Bataille. His first lengthy philosophical treatise, it was followed by Guilty (1944) and On Nietzsche (1945). Together, the three works constitute Bataille's Summa Atheologica, in which he explores the experience of excess, expressed in forms such as laughter, tears, eroticism, death, sacrifice and poetry.

== Summary ==
Bataille discusses "inner experience", which he defines as states usually considered forms of mystical experience, including ecstasy and rapture.

== Reception ==
Inner Experience received a negative reception from several authors due to having been published during the Second World War. Bataille was criticized for this privately by Jules Monnerot, and publicly by Patrick Waldberg. Boris Souvarine regarded its publication as a sign of Bataille's acceptance of the occupation of France. Bataille was attacked by surrealists in a pamphlet entitled Nom de Dieu. The surrealists considered Bataille an idealist. The philosopher Gabriel Marcel criticized the work from a Christian perspective.
