= Paracletus =

Studio album by Deathspell Omega
- Released: 9 November 2010
- Genres: Black metal, avant-garde metal
- Length: 42:34
- Label: Norma Evangelium Diaboli

Deathspell Omega chronology
Veritas Diaboli Manet in Aeternum: Chaining the Katechon (2008)	Paracletus (2010)	Diabolus Absconditus (2011)

Professional ratings
Review scores
Source	Rating
AllMusic	4.5/5 stars
Avantgarde-Metal.com	(extremely favorable)
Sputnikmusic	4.5/5 stars

Paracletus is the fifth full-length studio album recorded by the French black metal band Deathspell Omega, released on 9 November 2010 through Norma Evangelium Diaboli along with Season of Mist. It is the third part in their metaphysical trilogy of albums representing God, the Devil and Man (following Si monvmentvm reqvires, circvmspice and Fas – Ite, Maledicti, in Ignem Aeternum).

The term paracletus is the Latinised form of the Greek word παράκλητος (parákletos), meaning comforter. It is another name for the Holy Spirit.

Stylistically the album continues in the experimental vein of their previous work since 2004. The tracks are mostly continuous, being more movements of a larger piece than individual songs, although there are slight pauses in between tracks 3 and 4 and between tracks 5 and 6. The track "Devouring Famine" was released as a free download by Season of Mist approximately three weeks before the album's release.

In 2013, Decibel ranked Paracletus at number 50 on its list of the Top 100 Black Metal Albums of All Time.

== Track listing ==
No.	Title	Length
1.	"Epiklesis"	1:42
2.	"Wings of Predation"	3:43
3.	"Abscission"	6:07
4.	"Dearth"	3:47
5.	"Phosphene"	7:03
6.	"Epiklesis"	3:06
7.	"Malconfort"	4:57
8.	"Have You Beheld the Fevers?"	2:59
9.	"Devouring Famine"	5:09
10.	"Apokatastasis Pantôn"	4:01
Total length:		42:34

== See also ==
- Abscission
- Apocatastasis
- Epiclesis
- Paraclete
- Phosphene
