= Fleshpress =

Finnish metal band

Fleshpress is a Finnish sludge/doom metal band. They have released eight albums, among which 2011's Acid Mouth Strangulation came out through Svart Records.

== Select discography ==
- Dilemmantrauma (EP, 2000)
- Fleshpress (2002)
- III - The Art of Losing All (2004)
- Wörm Dirges (2004)
- Pillars (2007)
- No Return (EP, 2010)
- Rebuild / Crumble (EP, 2010)
- Acid Mouth Strangulation (2011, Svart Records)
- Tearing Skyholes (2013)
- Hulluuden muuri (2017)
- Viimeinen saavutettu tahto (2024)

== External link ==
- Discogs

=== Further reading ===
- Review of Tearing Skyholes by Echoes and Dust
- Review of Hulluuden muuri by Teeth of the Divine
- Review of Hulluuden muuri by Grave Noise
