= The Ajna Offensive =

American independent record label

- Founded: 1992
- Founder: Tyler Davis, Stephen O'Malley
- Genre: Extreme metal, experimental
- Country of origin: United States
- Location: Jacksonville, Oregon
- Official website: theajnaoffensive.com

The Ajna Offensive is an American independent record label which releases extreme metal, experimental music and neofolk records, and books related to occultism, ritual work, magic theory and meta-history. The proprietor of the label is Tyler Davis, who had met a man with a music project called Plecid and who subsequently worked with Stephen O'Malley on the black metal fanzine Descent. O'Malley was later involved with the development of The Ajna Offensive record label.

Ajna, a Sanskrit word meaning command, is the third eye chakra, the sixth primary chakra in the body, according to Hindu tradition.

== History ==
The Ajna Offensive label evolved in 1992 out of the "Warloch" label then managed by Davis. Davis and O'Malley first met after Davis sent O'Malley a very excitable letter upon reading the first issue of Descent. Tyler offered all of his energy to Descent, while Stephen offered his energies towards The Ajna Offensive record label. In reviewing metal bands for the magazine, Davis felt that black metal had not yet reached its potential. At one point, he and O'Malley listened to a trunk of about 150 demos, giving some of them positive reviews in Descent.

The first album released from the label was Plecid.

According to Stylus Magazine, The Ajna Offensive appears to be an aesthetically steered label, from the color and layout of the website to the bands it chooses to distribute and promote.

Estimated annual sales of The Ajna Offensive is 86,000 copies. The label's Standard Industrial Classification code is 7389 and its North American Industry Classification System code is 561990.

== Artists ==
- 88MM
- Acrimonious
- Allerseelen
- Altar of Perversion
- Antaeus
- Aosoth
- Averse Sefira
- Bobby Beausoleil
- Dagon
- Dapnom
- Deathkey
- Deathspell Omega
- Den
- Deströyer 666
- Funeral Mist
- Infernal Proteus
- Katharsis
- Lotus Eaters
- Malokarpatan
- Mortuus
- Negative Plane
- Ofermod
- Ondskapt
- Psychonaut
- Robert X. Patriot
- Plecid
- Reencarnacion
- Root
- Sacrificial Totem
- Secrets of the Moon
- Sigrblot
- Silbernacht
- Strict
- Symphonia Sacrosancta Phasmatvm
- Taint
- Teitanblood
- Tiermes
- Tormentor
- Ultra
- Villains
- Volupså
- Watain
- Weapon
- Wolfskin
