= Georges Bataille =

French intellectual and literary figure (1897–1962)

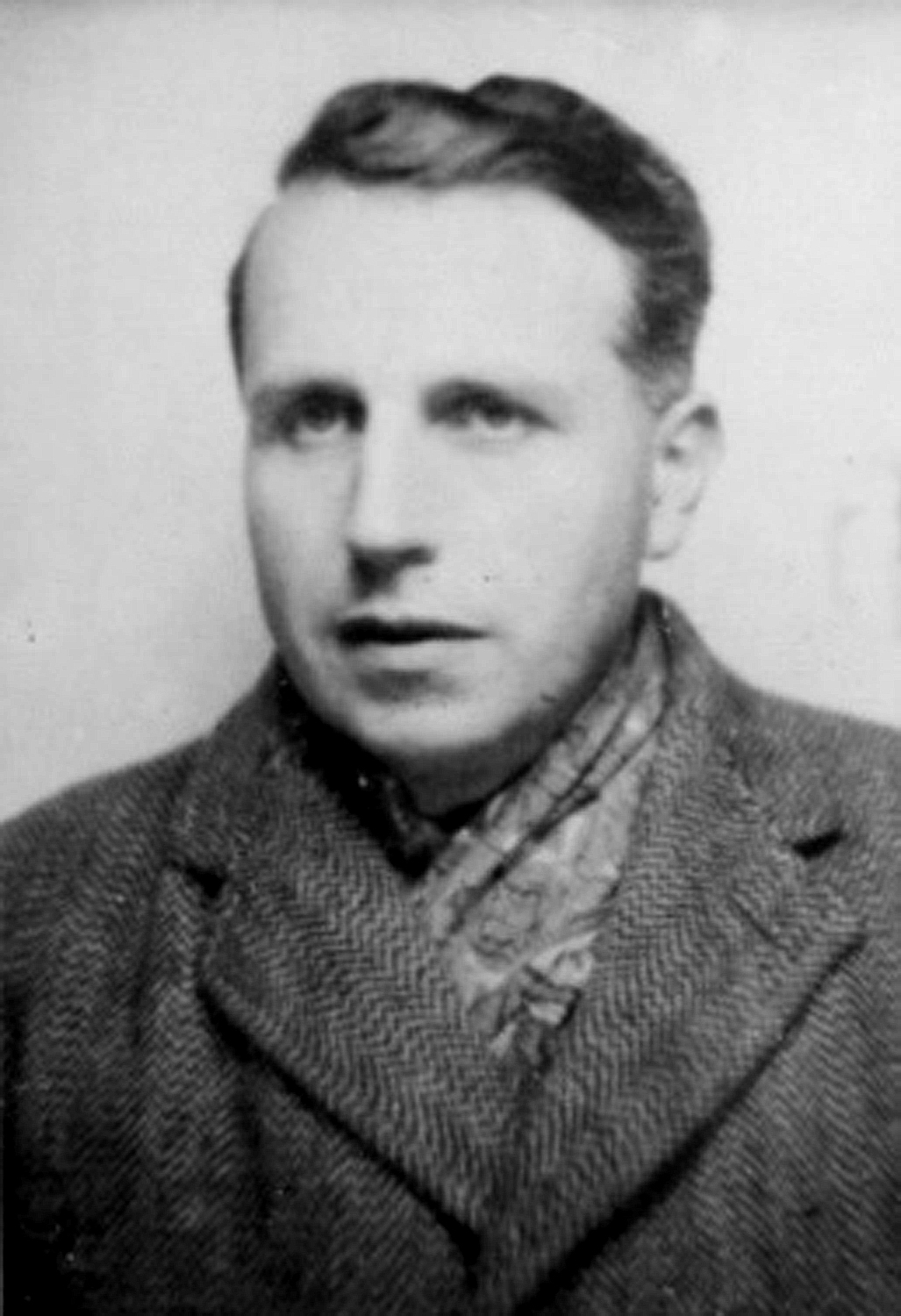
- Bataille in 1943
- Born: Georges Albert Maurice Victor Bataille; 10 September 1897; Billom, France
- Died: 8 July 1962 (aged 64); Paris, France
- Political party: CCD (1931–1934)
- Spouse(s): Sylvia Bataille (m. 1928; div. 1946) Diane Kotchoubey de Beauharnais (m. 1951; died 1962)
- Children: 2, including Laurence

Education
- Education: École Nationale des Chartes (B.A., 1922)

Philosophical work
- Era: 20th-century philosophy
- Region: Western philosophy
- School: Continental philosophy French Nietzscheanism (Note: • Georges Bataille, The Absence of Myth: Writings on Surrealism (Michael Richardson, trans.), Verso, 1994, p. 101 n. 3: "Albert Camus said ... 'Bataille's Nietzscheanism doesn't seem very orthodox to me...'" • Alan D. Schrift, Poststructuralism and Critical Theory's Second Generation, Routledge, 2014, ch. 1: "French Nietzscheanism", p. 22: "the most significant figure here [in French Nietzscheanism] was Georges Bataille". • Nikolaj Lübecker, Community, Myth and Recognition in Twentieth-Century French Literature and Thought, Continuum, 2009, p. 70: "Bataille's unreserved Nietzscheanism". • Andrew J. Mitchell, Jason Kemp Winfree (eds.), SUNY Press, 2009, p. 51: "Bataille's "Dionysian" Nietzscheanism". • Carolyn Bailey Gill (ed.), Bataille: Writing the Sacred, Routledge, 2005, p. 19: "One cannot understand Bataille well if one does not take his integral Nietzscheanism seriously..." • Robyn Marasco, The Highway of Despair: Critical Theory After Hegel, Columbia University Press, 2015, p. 119: "Geoff Waite casts Bataille as the founding father of a confused Left Nietzscheanism". • John Milfull, Attractions of Fascism: Social Psychology and Aesthetics of the "Triumph of the Right", Bloomsbury Academic, 1990, p. 90: "Bataille's Nietzscheanism is an interesting case in point, and I think it is relevant for an understanding of later thinkers such as Gilles Deleuze and Michel Foucault." • Michael Wood, Literature and the Taste of Knowledge, Cambridge University Press, 2005, p. 170: "Bataille's Nietzscheanism". • Robin Adèle Greeley, Surrealism and the Spanish Civil War, Yale University Press, 2006, p. 230: "Bataille's Nietzschean philosophy".)
- Main interests: Eroticism, theory of sovereignty, sacredness, mysticism, surrealism, transgression, literary criticism
- Notable works: L'Abbé C, Blue of Noon, Story of the Eye, The Accursed Share, The Solar Anus, Inner Experience
- Notable ideas: Base materialism, limit-experience, "solar economy", "general economy"

Georges Albert Maurice Victor Bataille (/bɑːˈtaɪ/; French: [ʒɔʁʒ(ə) batɑj]; 10 September 1897 – 8 July 1962) was a French intellectual working in philosophy, literature, sociology, anthropology, and history of art. His writing, which included essays, novels, and poetry, explored such subjects as eroticism, mysticism, surrealism, and transgression. His work would prove influential on subsequent schools of philosophy and social theory, including post-structuralism.

== Early life ==
Georges Bataille was the son of Joseph-Aristide Bataille (b. 1851), a tax collector, and Antoinette-Aglaë Tournarde (b. 1865). Born on 10 September 1897 in Billom in the region of Auvergne, his family moved to Reims in 1898, where he was baptized. He went to school in Reims and then Épernay. Although brought up without religious observance, he converted to Catholicism in 1914, and became a devout Catholic for about nine years. He considered entering the priesthood and attended a Catholic seminary briefly. However, he quit, apparently in part in order to pursue an occupation where he could eventually support his mother. He eventually renounced Christianity in the early 1920s.

Bataille attended the École Nationale des Chartes in Paris, graduating in February 1922. He graduated with a bachelor's thesis titled L'ordre de la chevalerie, conte en vers du xiiie siècle, avec introduction et notes. This was a critical edition of the medieval poem L'Ordre de chevalerie, which he produced directly by classifying the eight manuscripts from which he reconstructed the poem. After graduating he moved to the School of Advanced Spanish Studies in Madrid. As a young man, he befriended, and was much influenced by, the Russian existentialist Lev Shestov, who schooled him in the writing of Nietzsche, Dostoevsky, and Plato as well as Shestov's own critique of reason and philosophical systematization. Though he is often referred to as an archivist and a librarian because of his employment at the Bibliothèque Nationale, his work there was with the medallion collections (he also published scholarly articles on numismatics).

== Career ==
Founder of several journals and literary groups, Bataille is the author of a large and diverse body of work: readings, poems, essays on innumerable subjects (on the mysticism of economy, poetry, philosophy, the arts and eroticism). He sometimes published under pseudonyms, and some of his publications were banned. He was relatively ignored during his lifetime and scorned by contemporaries such as Jean-Paul Sartre as an advocate of mysticism, but after his death had considerable influence on authors such as Michel Foucault, Philippe Sollers, and Jacques Derrida, all of whom were affiliated with the journal Tel Quel. His influence is felt most explicitly in the phenomenological work of Jean-Luc Nancy, but is also significant for the work of Jean Baudrillard, the psychoanalytic theories of Jacques Lacan, Julia Kristeva, and recent anthropological work from the likes of Michael Taussig.

Initially attracted to Surrealism, Bataille quickly fell out with its founder André Breton, although Bataille and the Surrealists resumed cautiously cordial relations after World War II. Bataille was a member of the extremely influential College of Sociology which included several other renegade surrealists. He was heavily influenced by Hegel, Freud, Marx, Marcel Mauss, the Marquis de Sade, Alexandre Kojève, and Friedrich Nietzsche, the last of whom he defended in a notable essay against appropriation by the Nazis.

Fascinated by human sacrifice, he founded a secret society, Acéphale, the symbol of which was a headless man. According to legend, Bataille and the other members of Acéphale each agreed to be the sacrificial victim as an inauguration; none of them would agree to be the executioner. An indemnity was offered for an executioner, but none was found before the dissolution of Acéphale shortly before the war. The group also published an eponymous review of Nietzsche's philosophy which attempted to postulate what Derrida has called an "anti-sovereignty". Collaborators in these projects included André Masson, Pierre Klossowski, Roger Caillois, Jules Monnerot, Jean Rollin and Jean Wahl. The German philosopher and cultural critic, Walter Benjamin, described Bataille and Acéphale's fascination with sacrifice as a "pre-fascist aestheticism".

Bataille drew from diverse influences and used various modes of discourse to create his work. His novel Story of the Eye (Histoire de l'œil), published under the pseudonym Lord Auch (literally, Lord "to the shithouse" — "auch" being short for "aux chiottes", slang for telling somebody off by sending him to the toilet), was initially read as pure pornography, while interpretation of the work has gradually matured to reveal the same considerable philosophical and emotional depth that is characteristic of other writers who have been categorized within "literature of transgression". The imagery of the novel is built upon a series of metaphors which in turn refer to philosophical constructs developed in his work: the eye, the egg, the Sun, the Earth, the testicle.

Other famous novels include the posthumously published My Mother (which would become the basis of Christophe Honoré's film Ma Mère), The Impossible and Blue of Noon, which, with its incest, necrophilia, politics, and autobiographical undertones, is a much darker treatment of contemporary historical reality.

During World War II Bataille produced Summa Atheologica (the title parallels Thomas Aquinas' Summa Theologica) which comprises his works Inner Experience, Guilty, and On Nietzsche. After the war he composed The Accursed Share, which he said represented thirty years' work. The singular conception of "sovereignty" expounded there would become an important topic of discussion for Derrida, Giorgio Agamben, Jean-Luc Nancy and others. Bataille also founded the influential journal Critique. In 1955 Bataille published short books on Manet and the cave painting of Lascaux with his friend the publisher Albert Skira, the only monographs on painting written by a philosopher intended for a mass audience, both texts that have been influential on artistic practise in his home country in recent years.

== Personal life ==
Bataille's first marriage was to actress Sylvia Maklès, in 1928; they divorced in 1934, and she later married the psychoanalyst Jacques Lacan. Bataille also had an affair with Colette Peignot, who died in 1938. In 1946 Bataille married Diane de Beauharnais (author, pseudonym, Selena Warfield, and great-granddaughter of Eugen Maximilianovich, 5th Duke of Leuchtenberg), with whom he had a daughter.

In 1955 Bataille was diagnosed with cerebral arteriosclerosis, although he was not informed at the time of the terminal nature of his illness. He died seven years later, on 8 July 1962.

Bataille was an atheist.

== Key concepts ==
=== Base materialism ===
Bataille developed base materialism during the late 1920s and early 1930s as an attempt to break with mainstream materialism, which he viewed as a subtle form of idealism. He argues for the concept of an active base matter that disrupts the opposition of high and low and destabilises all foundations. Inspired by Gnostic ideas, this notion of materialism defies strict definition and rationalisation. Base materialism was a major influence on Derrida's deconstruction, and both thinkers attempt to destabilise philosophical oppositions by means of an unstable "third term". Bataille's notion of materialism may also be seen as anticipating Louis Althusser's conception of aleatory materialism or "materialism of the encounter," which draws on similar atomist metaphors to sketch a world in which causality and actuality are abandoned in favour of limitless possibilities of action.

=== The "accursed share" ===
The "accursed share" is an economic concept Bataille introduced in his book La Part maudite published in 1949 by Les Éditions de Minuit. The book was translated into English and published in 1991, with the title The Accursed Share. It presents a new economic theory, which Bataille calls "general economy," as distinct from the "restricted" economic perspective of most economic theory. Thus, in the theoretical introduction, Bataille writes the following:

I will simply state, without waiting further, that the extension of economic growth itself requires the overturning of economic principles—the overturning of the ethics that grounds them. Changing from the perspectives of restrictive economy to those of general economy actually accomplishes a Copernican transformation: a reversal of thinking—and of ethics. If a part of wealth (subject to a rough estimate) is doomed to destruction or at least to unproductive use without any possible profit, it is logical, even inescapable, to surrender commodities without return. Henceforth, leaving aside pure and simple dissipation, analogous to the construction of the Pyramids, the possibility of pursuing growth is itself subordinated to giving: The industrial development of the entire world demands of Americans that they lucidly grasp the necessity, for an economy such as theirs, of having a margin of profitless operations. An immense industrial network cannot be managed in the same way that one changes a tire… It expresses a circuit of cosmic energy on which it depends, which it cannot limit, and whose laws it cannot ignore without consequences. Woe to those who, to the very end, insist on regulating the movement that exceeds them with the narrow mind of the mechanic who changes a tire.

Thus, according to Bataille's theory of consumption, the accursed share is that excessive and non-recuperable part of any economy which is destined to one of two modes of economic and social expenditure. This must either be spent luxuriously and knowingly without gain in the arts, in non-procreative sexuality, in spectacles and sumptuous monuments, or it is obliviously destined to an outrageous and catastrophic outpouring in war. Though the distinction is less apparent in Robert Hurley's English translation, Bataille introduces the neologism "consummation" (akin to a fire's burning) to signal this excess expenditure as distinct from "consommation" (the non-excess expenditure more familiarly treated in theories of "restricted" economy).

The notion of "excess" energy is central to Bataille's thinking. Bataille's inquiry takes the superabundance of energy, beginning from the infinite outpouring of solar energy or the surpluses produced by life's basic chemical reactions, as the norm for organisms. In other words, an organism in Bataille's general economy, unlike the rational actors of classical economy who are motivated by scarcity, normally has an "excess" of energy available to it. This extra energy can be used productively for the organism's growth or it can be lavishly expended. Bataille insists that an organism's growth or expansion always runs up against limits and becomes impossible. The wasting of this energy is "luxury." The form and role luxury assumes in a society, are characteristic of that society. "The accursed share" refers to this excess, destined for waste, which he calls "dépense" (French for expenditure). This non-productive expenditure of excess energy, which transcends the mere requirements for survival, challenges traditional economic paradigms by emphasizing the importance of unproductive uses of surplus that contribute to societal and cultural enrichment, rather than mere economic growth. Bataille's exploration of dépense highlights the philosophical and existential dimensions of how societies utilize their surplus resources.

Crucial to the formulation of the theory was Bataille's reflection upon the phenomenon of potlatch. It is influenced by Marcel Mauss's The Gift, as well as by Friedrich Nietzsche's On the Genealogy of Morals. Reception to the accursed share concept was mixed.

== Bibliography ==
A work-in-progress listing of Bataille's work and English translations can be found at Progressive Geographies.

Complete works

- Georges Bataille, Œuvres complètes (Paris: Gallimard):
  - Volume 1: Premiers écrits, 1922–1940: Histoire de l'œil – L'Anus solaire – Sacrifices – Articles
  - Volume 2: Écrits posthumes, 1922–1940
  - Volume 3: Œuvres littéraires: Madame Edwarda – Le Petit – L'Archangélique – L'Impossible – La Scissiparité – L'Abbé C. – L'être indifférencié n'est rien – Le Bleu du ciel
  - Volume 4: Œuvres littéraires posthumes: Poèmes – Le Mort – Julie – La Maison brûlée – La Tombe de Louis XXX – Divinus Deus – Ébauches
  - Volume 5: La Somme athéologique I: L'Expérience intérieure – Méthode de méditation – Post-scriptum 1953 – Le Coupable – L'Alleluiah
  - Volume 6: La Somme athéologique II: Sur Nietzsche – Mémorandum – Annexes
  - Volume 7: L'économie à la mesure de l'univers – La Part maudite – La limite de l'utile (Fragments) – Théorie de la Religion – Conférences 1947–1948 – Annexes
  - Volume 8: L'Histoire de l'érotisme – Le surréalisme au jour le jour – Conférences 1951–1953 – La Souveraineté – Annexes
  - Volume 9: Lascaux, ou La naissance de l'art – Manet – La littérature et le mal – Annexes
  - Volume 10: L'érotisme – Le procès de Gilles de Rais – Les larmes d'Éros
  - Volume 11: Articles I, 1944–1949
  - Volume 12: Articles II, 1950–1961
- Georges Bataille: Une liberté souveraine: Textes et entretiens, 2004 (articles, book reviews and interviews not included in Œuvres complètes, Michel Surya Ed.)

Works published in French

- Histoire de l'œil, 1928 (Story of the Eye) (under pseudonym of Lord Auch)
- L'Anus solaire, 1931 (The Solar Anus)
- The Notion of Expenditure, 1933
- L'Amitié, 1940 (Friendship) (under pseudonym of Dianus; early version of Part One of Le Coupable)
- Madame Edwarda, 1941 (under pseudonym of Pierre Angélique, fictitiously dated 1937; 2nd Edition: 1945; 3rd Edition: 1956 published with preface in Bataille's name)
- Le Petit, 1943 (under pseudonym of Louis Trente; fictitious publication date of 1934)
- L'expérience intérieure, 1943 (Inner Experience)
- L'Archangélique, 1944 (The Archangelical)
- Le Coupable, 1944 (Guilty)
- Sur Nietzsche, 1945 (On Nietzsche)
- Dirty, 1945
- L'Orestie, 1945 (The Oresteia)
- Histoire de rats, 1947 (A Story of Rats)
- L'Alleluiah, 1947 (Alleluia: The Catechism of Dianus)
- Méthode de méditation, 1947 (Method of Meditation)
- La Haine de la Poésie, 1947 (The Hatred of Poetry; reissued in 1962 as The Impossible)
- La Scissiparité, 1949 (The Scission)
- La Part maudite, 1949 (The Accursed Share)
- L'Abbé C, 1950
- L'expérience intérieure, 1954 (second edition of Inner Experience, followed by Method of Meditation and Post-scriptum 1953)
- L'Être indifférencié n'est rien, 1954 (Undifferentiated Being is Nothing)
- Lascaux, ou la Naissance de l'Art, 1955
- Manet, 1955
- Le paradoxe de l'érotisme, Nouvelle Revue Française, n°29, 1er Mai 1955.
- Le Bleu du ciel, 1957 (written 1935–36) (Blue of Noon)
- La littérature et le Mal, 1957 (Literature and Evil)
- L'Erotisme, 1957 (Erotism)
- Le Coupable, 1961 (Guilty, second, revised edition, followed by Alleluia: The Catechism of Dianus)
- Les larmes d'Éros, 1961 (The Tears of Eros)
- L'Impossible : Histoire de rats suivi de Dianus et de L'Orestie, 1962 (The Impossible)

Posthumous works

- Ma Mère, 1966 (My Mother)
- Le Mort, 1967 (The Dead Man)
- Théorie de la Religion, 1973 (Theory of Religion)

Translated works

- Lascaux; or, the Birth of Art, the Prehistoric Paintings, Austryn Wainhouse, 1955, Lausanne: Skira.
- Manet, Austryn Wainhouse and James Emmons, 1955, Editions d'Art Albert Skira.
- Literature and Evil, Alastair Hamilton, 1973, Calder & Boyars Ltd.
- Visions of Excess: Selected Writings 1927–1939, Allan Stoekl, Carl R. Lovitt, and Donald M. Leslie, Jr., 1985, University of Minnesota Press.
- Erotism: Death and Sensuality, Mary Dalwood, 1986, City Lights Books.
- Story of the Eye, Joachim Neugroschel, 1987, City Lights Books.
- The Accursed Share: An Essay On General Economy. Volume I: Consumption, Robert Hurley, 1988, Zone Books.
- The College of Sociology, 1937–39 (Bataille et al), Betsy Wing, 1988, University of Minnesota Press.
- Guilty, Bruce Boone, 1988, The Lapis Press.
- Inner Experience, Leslie Anne Boldt, 1988, State University of New York.
- My Mother, Madame Edwarda, The Dead Man, Austryn Wainhouse, with essays by Yukio Mishima and Ken Hollings, 1989, Marion Boyars Publishers.
- The Tears of Eros, Peter Connor, 1989, City Lights Books.
- Theory of Religion, Robert Hurley, 1989, Zone Books.
- The Accursed Share: Volumes II and III, Robert Hurley, 1991, Zone Books.
- The Impossible, Robert Hurley, 1991, City Lights Books.
- The Trial of Gilles de Rais, Richard Robinson, 1991, Amok Press.
- On Nietzsche, Bruce Boone, 1992, Paragon House.
- The Absence of Myth: Writings on Surrealism, Michael Richardson, 1994, Verso.
- Encyclopaedia Acephalica (Bataille et al), Iain White et al., 1995, Atlas Press.
- L'Abbé C, Philip A Facey, 2001, Marion Boyars Publishers.
- Blue of Noon, Harry Mathews, 2002, Marion Boyars Publishers.
- The Unfinished System of Nonknowledge, Stuart Kendall and Michelle Kendall, 2004, University of Minnesota Press.
- The Cradle of Humanity: Prehistoric Art and Culture, Stuart Kendall, Michelle Kendall, 2009, Zone Books.
- Divine Filth: Lost Scatology and Erotica, Mark Spitzer, 2009, Solar Books.
- W.C., (fragmented) novel by Georges Bataille and Antonio Contiero; edited by Transeuropa Edizioni (Massa, 9/2011), ISBN 978-88-7580-150-2; accompanied with music by Alessandra Celletti and Jaan Patterson (Bubutz Records).
- Collected Poems of Georges Bataille, Mark Spitzer (ed.), 1998, 1999, Dufour Editions. Hardback is titled Collected Poetry of Georges Bataille, 1998.
- The Sacred Conspiracy: The Internal Papers of the Secret Society of Acéphale and Lectures to the College of Sociology, with additional texts by Roger Caillois, translated by Natasha Lehrer, John Harman and Meyer Barash, Atlas, 2018.
