= Paper tiger =

Chinese phrase for an ineffectual threat

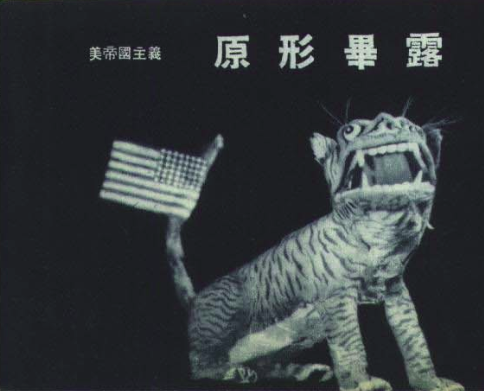
A paper tiger with a U.S. flag, symbolizing the United States (China Pictorial, August 1950 issue)

"Paper tiger" is a calque of the Chinese phrase zhǐlǎohǔ (simplified Chinese: 纸老虎; traditional Chinese: 紙老虎). The term refers to something or someone that claims or appears to be powerful or threatening but is actually ineffectual and unable to withstand challenge.

The expression became well known internationally as a slogan used by Mao Zedong, former chairman of the Chinese Communist Party and paramount leader of China, against his political opponents, particularly the United States. It has since been used in various capacities and variations to describe many other opponents and entities.

== Origin ==
Zhilaohu dates back to the 14th century, during the early Ming dynasty. The Chinese phrase is used in a line of Water Margin, one of the Classic Chinese Novels: "But when the time comes for action, what good are you? Seeing a paper tiger, you cry out in fright." The concept is also present in a letter sent by Li Hongzhang, a leader of the Self-Strengthening Movement, to Wu Yong, the husband of Zeng Guofan's granddaughter. Lamenting the state of the Qing military, his letter says: "All the undertakings of my life, training troops and building the navy, were merely paper tigers; how could I ever truly manage them as I wished? It was all a matter of superficial embellishment, where as long as the truth wasn't exposed, one could muddle through for the moment."

Robert Morrison, the British missionary and lexicographer, translated the phrase as "a paper tiger" in Vocabulary of the Canton Dialect in 1828. John Francis Davis translated the Chinese phrase as "paper tiger" in a book on Chinese history published in 1836. In a meeting with Henry Kissinger in 1973, Mao Zedong claimed in a humorous aside to have coined the English phrase.

== Use ==
Mao Zedong first introduced his idea of paper tigers to Americans in an August 1946 interview with American journalist Anna Louise Strong:

The atom bomb is a paper tiger which the U.S. reactionaries use to scare people. It looks terrible, but in fact it isn't. Of course, the atom bomb is a weapon of mass slaughter, but the outcome of a war is decided by the people, not by one or two new types of weapon. All reactionaries are paper tigers. In appearance, the reactionaries are terrifying, but in reality they are not so powerful.

Mao Zedong's translator, who was skilled at English, initially translated "paper tiger" as "scarecrow" in an attempt to use a cultural reference point an American would understand. Mao realized something had been lost in translation, and asked the translator what a scarecrow was. On hearing the answer, Mao rejected the term, switching to his heavily accented English to clarify that he meant a "paper tiger". Anna Louise Strong identifies the translator as Lu Dingyi in her 1948 memoir Tomorrow's China, while some other sources instead identify Yu Guangsheng as the translator.

In a 1956 interview with Strong, Mao used the phrase "paper tiger" to describe American imperialism again:

In appearance it is very powerful but in reality it is nothing to be afraid of; it is a paper tiger. Outwardly a tiger, it is made of paper, unable to withstand the wind and the rain. I believe that it is nothing but a paper tiger.

In 1957, Mao reminisced about the original interview with Strong:

In an interview, I discussed many questions with her, including Chiang Kai-shek, Hitler, Japan, the United States and the atom bomb. I said all allegedly powerful reactionaries are merely paper tigers. The reason is that they are divorced from the people. Look! Wasn't Hitler a paper tiger? Wasn't he overthrown?

In this view, "paper tigers" are superficially powerful but are prone to overextension that leads to sudden collapse. When Mao criticized Soviet appeasement of the United States during the Sino-Soviet split, Soviet Premier Nikita Khrushchev reportedly said, "the paper tiger has nuclear teeth".

The discourse of Ruguanxue deems the United States as a paper tiger which appears to be strong and affluent but is in fact in decline.

The term was frequently used in Chinese Internet discourse regarding the trade war begun by United States President Donald Trump. Internet users referred to Trump as a paper tiger, frequently observing that the United States economy depends heavily on Chinese companies for a host of necessities, electronics, and raw components.

== Other uses ==
In The Resistance to Theory (1982), Paul de Man used the phrase to reflect upon the threat of literary theory to traditional literary scholarship in American academia. He said, "If a cat is called a tiger it can easily be dismissed as a paper tiger; the question remains however why one was so scared of the cat in the first place".

The Little Red Schoolbook (1969) states, "all grown-ups are paper tigers". The book was controversial for instructing teenagers to challenge authority, and the quote was deemed its most famous.

Osama bin Laden described U.S. soldiers as "paper tigers".

The phrase was used in a 2006 speech by then-United States Senator Joe Biden to describe North Korea after a series of missile launches from the country that same year, defying the warnings of the international community while still incapable of directly harming the United States.

In 2025, Donald Trump used the phrase to dismiss Russia's conduct of Russo-Ukrainian war while delivering a speech at the United Nations. He also used the phrase in March 2026 in reference to NATO not coming to the aid the U.S. during the 2026 Iran war.

China itself has been called a paper tiger. In 2021, Michael Beckley argued in his book Unrivaled: Why America Will Remain the World's Sole Superpower that China would not be able to overtake the United States, and that the belief that China is stronger than it really is is detrimental to American perceptions and policy. According to Beckley, this is because "China's economic, financial, technological, and military strength is hugely exaggerated by crude and inaccurate statistics": for example, Beckley states that high-scoring Chinese education statistics are actually cherry-picked, that the People's Liberation Army is not as strong as the United States Armed Forces due to their differing focuses, and that China's large GDP does not equate to their actual strength or power.

== See also ==
- Feet of clay
- Straw dog
- China's final warning
