= Madness and Civilization =

1961 book by Michel Foucault

- The Librairie Plon edition
- Author: Michel Foucault
- Original title: Folie et Déraison – Histoire de la folie à l'âge classique
- Translator: Richard Howard (abridged edition); Jonathan Murphy and Jean Khalfa (unabridged edition)
- Language: French
- Subject: Insanity
- Published: 1961 (Librairie Plon, in French); 1964 (in English)
- Publication place: France
- Media type: Print (Hardcover and Paperback)
- Pages: 299 (Vintage edition); 725 (unabridged edition)
- ISBN: 0-679-72110-X (Vintage edition); 0-415-27701-9 (unabridged edition)

Madness and Civilization: A History of Insanity in the Age of Reason (Note: The original title was changed for the second edition of 1972 by Éditions Gallimard, revised and expanded, and replaced with the previous subtitle: "History of madness in the classical age".) (French: Folie et Déraison – Histoire de la folie à l'âge classique), a 1961 book by Michel Foucault, is an examination of the evolution of the meaning of madness in the cultures and laws, politics, philosophy, and medicine of Europe—from the Middle Ages until the end of the 18th century—and a critique of the idea of history and of the historical method.

Although he uses the language of phenomenology to describe the influence of social structures in the history of the Othering of insane people from society, Madness and Civilization is Foucault's philosophical progress from phenomenology toward something like structuralism (a label Foucault himself always adamantly rejected).

== Background ==
Philosopher Michel Foucault developed Madness and Civilization from his earlier works in the field of psychology, (Note: Foucault had a bachelor's degree in psychology (1949) and a diploma in psychopathology (1952)) his personal psychological difficulties, and his professional experiences working in a mental hospital. He wrote the book between 1955 and 1959, when he worked cultural-diplomatic and educational posts in Poland and Germany, as well as in Sweden as director of a French cultural centre at the University of Uppsala.

== Summary ==
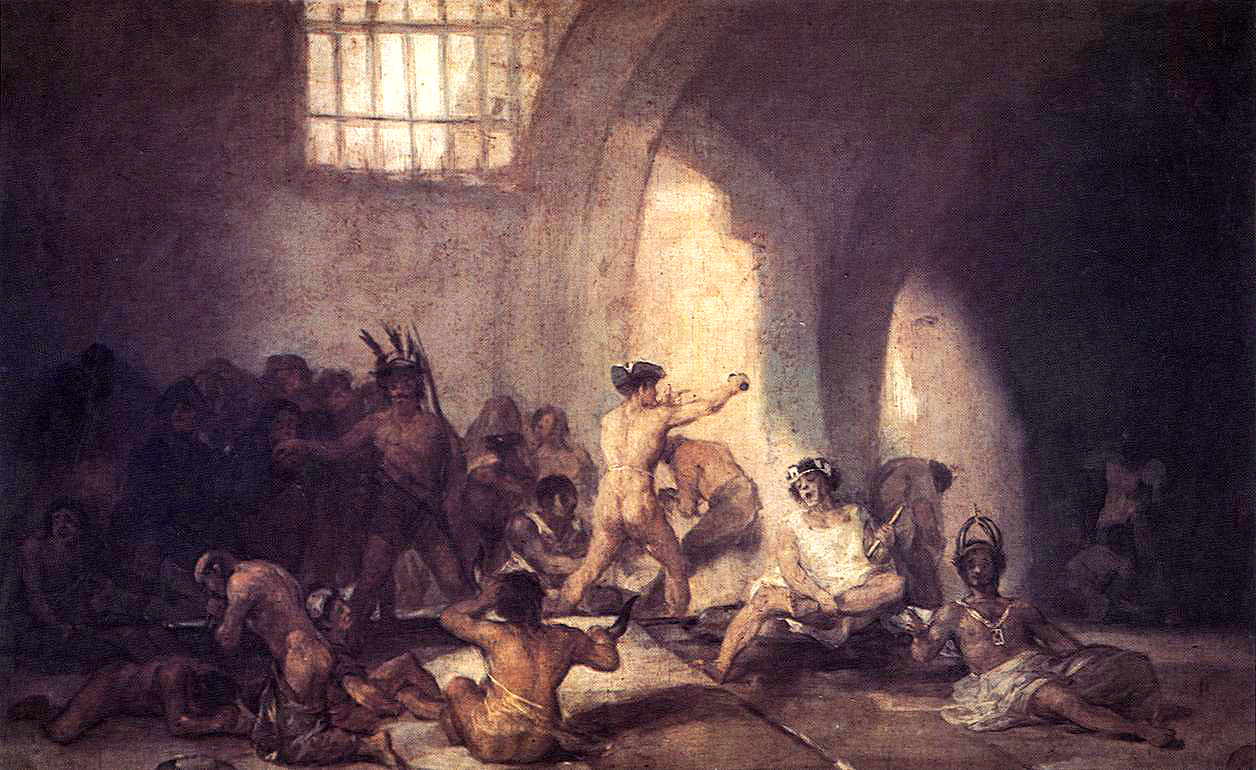
In the 17th-century Age of Reason, insane and socially undesirable people would end at The Madhouse. (Francisco Goya, 1812–1819)

In Madness and Civilization, Foucault traces the cultural evolution of the concept of insanity (madness) in three phases:

1. the Renaissance;
2. the Classical Age; and
3. the Modern era

=== Middle Ages ===
In the Middle Ages, society distanced lepers from itself, while in the "Classical Age" the object of social segregation was moved from lepers to madmen, but in a different way. The lepers of the Middle Ages were certainly considered dangerous, but they were not the object of a radical rejection, as would be demonstrated by the fact that leper hospitals were almost always located near the city gates, far but not invisible from the community. The relative presence of the leper reminded everyone of the duty of Christian charity, and therefore played a positive role in society. He mentioned how the leprosariums were made into madhouses.

=== Renaissance ===
In the Renaissance, art portrayed insane people as possessing wisdom (knowledge of the limits of the world), whilst literature portrayed the insane as people who reveal the distinction between what men are and what men pretend to be. Renaissance art and literature further depicted insane people as intellectually engaged with reasonable people, because their madness represented the mysterious forces of cosmic tragedy. Foucault contrasts the Renaissance image of the ship of fools with later conceptions of confinement. The Renaissance, rather than locking up madmen, ensured their circulation, so that the madman as a "passenger" and "passing being" became the symbol of the human condition: "Madness is the anticipation of death".

Yet Renaissance intellectualism began to develop an objective way of thinking about and describing reason and unreason, compared with the subjective descriptions of madness from the Middle Ages.

=== Classical Age ===
At the dawn of the Age of Reason in the 17th century, there occurred "the Great Confinement" of insane people in the countries of Europe; the initial management of insane people was to segregate them to the margins of society, and then to physically separate them from society by confinement, with other anti-social people (prostitutes, vagrants, blasphemers, et al.) into new institutions, such as the General Hospital of Paris. According to Foucault, the creation of the "general hospital" corresponds to Descartes's Meditations, and the desire to eliminate the irrational from philosophical discourse. "Classical reason" would have produced a "fracture" in the history of madness. Moreover, Christian European society perceived such anti-social people as being in moral error, for having freely chosen lives of prostitution, vagrancy, blasphemy, unreason, etc. To revert such moral errors, society's new institutions to confine outcast people featured way-of-life regimes composed of punishment-and-reward programs meant to compel the inmates to choose to reverse their choices of lifestyle.

The socio-economic forces that promoted this institutional confinement included the legalistic need for an extrajudicial social mechanism with the legal authority to physically separate socially undesirable people from mainstream society; and for controlling the wages and employment of poor people living in workhouses, whose availability lowered the wages of freeman workers. The conceptual distinction, between the mentally insane and the mentally sane, was a social construct produced by the practices of the extrajudicial separation of a human being from free society to institutional confinement. In turn, institutional confinement conveniently made insane people available to medical doctors then beginning to view madness as a natural object of study, and then as an illness to be cured.

=== Modern era ===
The Modern era began at the end of the 18th century, with the creation of medical institutions for confining mentally insane people under the supervision of medical doctors. Those institutions were product of two cultural motives: (i) the new goal of curing the insane away from poor families; and (ii) the old purpose of confining socially undesirable people to protect society. Those two, distinct social purposes soon were forgotten, and the medical institution became the only place for the administration of therapeutic treatments for madness. Although nominally more enlightened in scientific and diagnostic perspective, and compassionate in the clinical treatment of insane people, the modern medical institution remained as cruelly controlling as were medieval treatments for madness. In the preface to the 1961 edition of Madness and Civilization, Foucault said that:

Modern man no longer communicates with the madman ... There is no common language, or rather, it no longer exists; the constitution of madness as mental illness, at the end of the eighteenth century, bears witness to a rupture in a dialogue, gives the separation as already enacted, and expels from the memory all those imperfect words, of no fixed syntax, spoken falteringly, in which the exchange, between madness and reason, was carried out. The language of psychiatry, which is a monologue by reason about madness, could only have come into existence in such a silence.

== Reception ==
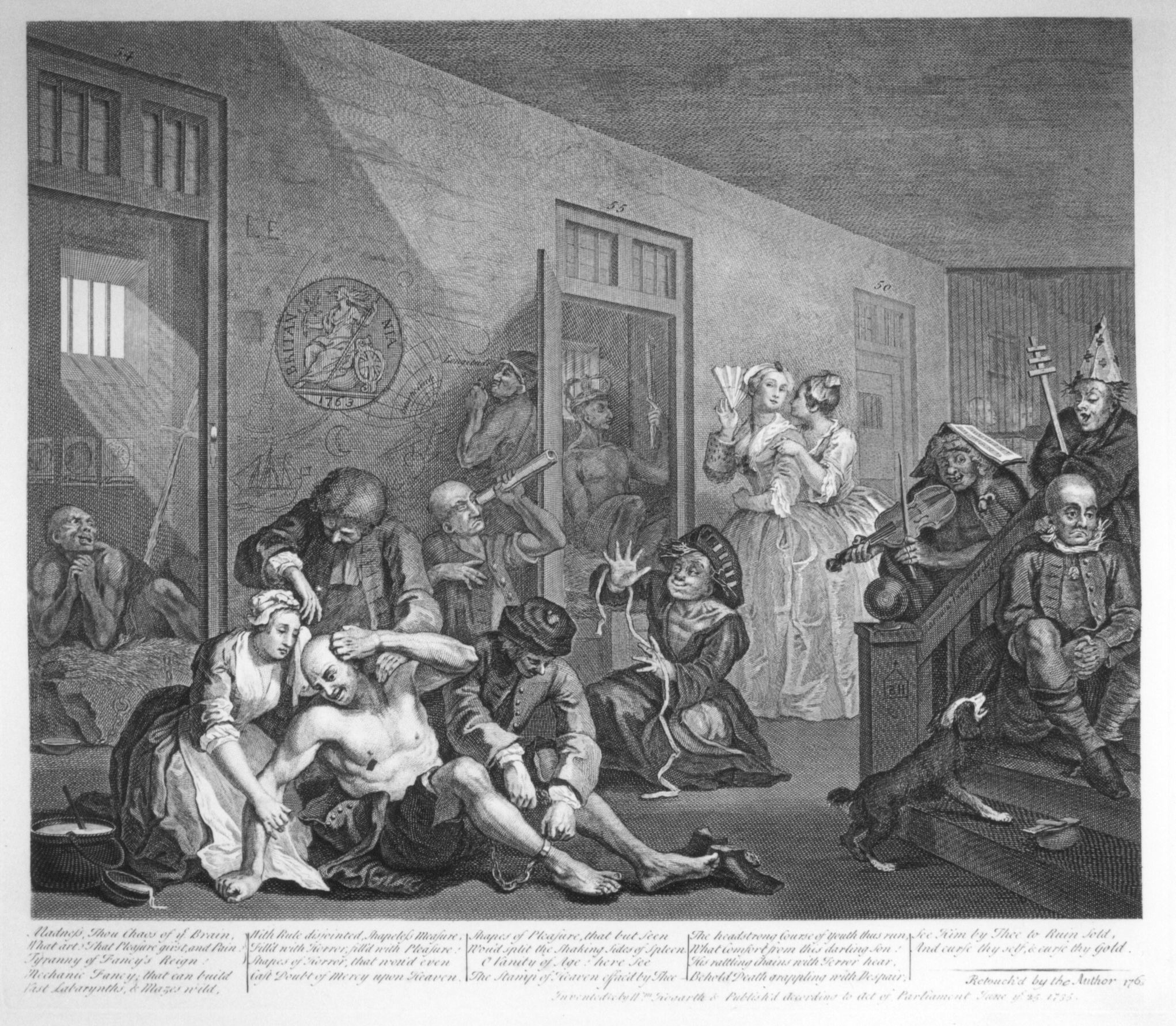
A Rake's Progress no. viii: the inmates at Bedlam Asylum, by William Hogarth

In the critical volume, Foucault (1985), the philosopher José Guilherme Merquior said that the value of Madness and Civilization as intellectual history was diminished by errors of fact and of interpretation that undermine Foucault's thesis—how social forces determine the meanings of madness and society's responses to the mental disorder of the person. Specifically problematic was his selective citation of data, which ignored contradictory historical evidence of preventive imprisonment and physical cruelty towards insane people during the historical periods when Foucault said society perceived the mad as wise people—institutional behaviors allowed by the culture of Christian Europeans who considered madness worse than sin. Nonetheless, Merquior said that, like the book Life Against Death (1959), by Norman O. Brown, Foucault's book about Madness and Civilization is "a call for the liberation of the Dionysian id"; and gave inspiration for Anti-Oedipus: Capitalism and Schizophrenia (1972), by the philosopher Gilles Deleuze and the psychoanalyst Félix Guattari.

In his 1994 essay "Phänomenologie des Krankengeistes" ('Phenomenology of the Sick Spirit'), philosopher Gary Gutting said:

[T]he reactions of professional historians to Foucault's Histoire de la folie [1961] seem, at first reading, ambivalent, not to say polarized. There are many acknowledgements of its seminal role, beginning with Robert Mandrou's early review in [the Annales d'Histoire Economique et Sociale], characterizing it as a "beautiful book" that will be "of central importance for our understanding of the Classical period." Twenty years later, Michael MacDonald confirmed Mandrou's prophecy: "Anyone who writes about the history of insanity in early modern Europe must travel in the spreading wake of Michael Foucault's famous book, Madness and Civilization."

Later endorsements included Jan Goldstein, who said: "For both their empirical content and their powerful theoretical perspectives, the works of Michel Foucault occupy a special and central place in the historiography of psychiatry;" and Roy Porter: "Time has proved Madness and Civilization [to be by] far the most penetrating work ever written on the history of madness." However, despite Foucault being herald of "the new cultural history", there was much criticism.

In Psychoanalysis and Male Homosexuality (1995), Kenneth Lewes said that Madness and Civilization is an example of the "critique of the institutions of psychiatry and psychoanalysis" that occurred as part of the "general upheaval of values in the 1960s." That the history Foucault presents in Madness and Civilization is similar to, but more profound than The Myth of Mental Illness (1961) by Thomas Szasz.

== See also ==
- Anti-psychiatry
- Cogito and the History of Madness
- The Archaeology of Knowledge
