= Fontana Modern Masters =

Series of books on writers and thinkers

The Fontana Modern Masters was a series of pocket guides on writers, philosophers, and other thinkers and theorists who shaped the intellectual landscape of the twentieth century. The first five titles were published on 12 January 1970 by Fontana Books, the paperback imprint of William Collins & Co, and the series editor was Frank Kermode, who was Professor of Modern English Literature at University College London. The books were very popular with students, who "bought them by the handful", according to Kermode, and they were instantly recognisable by their eye-catching covers, which featured brightly coloured abstract art and sans-serif typography.

== Art as book covers ==
Camus by Conor Cruise O'Brien, published by Fontana Books in 1970. The cover shows a detail from an Op Art painting by Oliver Bevan (details).

The Fontana Modern Masters occupy a unique place in publishing history – not for their contents but their covers, which draw on the following developments in twentieth-century art and literature:

- Twentieth-century geometric abstraction, colour-field painting and hard-edge painting.
- Op Art, and in particular the work of Victor Vasarely.
- The English beatnik Brion Gysin's cut-up technique as popularized by William Burroughs.

The cover concept was the brainchild of Fontana's art director John Constable, who had been experimenting with a cover treatment based on cut-ups of The Mud Bath, a key work of British geometric abstraction by the painter David Bomberg. However, a visit to the Grabowski Gallery in London introduced Constable to the work of Oliver Bevan, a graduate of the Royal College of Art in 1964, whose optical and geometric paintings were influenced by Vasarely's Op Art. On seeing Bevan's work, Constable commissioned him to create the covers for the first ten Fontana Modern Masters, which Bevan painted as rectilinear arrangements of tesselating blocks. Each cover was thus a piece of abstract art, but as an incentive for readers to buy all ten books the covers could be arranged to create a larger, composite artwork. The "set of ten" books appeared in 1970–71 but overran when Joyce was published with the same cover as Guevara:

- Camus by Conor Cruise O'Brien, 1970
- Chomsky by John Lyons, 1970
- Fanon by David Caute, 1970
- Guevara by Andrew Sinclair, 1970
- Lévi-Strauss by Edmund Leach, 1970
- Lukács by George Lichtheim, 1970
- Marcuse by Alasdair MacIntyre, 1970
- McLuhan by Jonathan Miller, 1971
- Orwell by Raymond Williams, 1971
- Wittgenstein by David Pears, 1971
- Joyce by John Gross, 1971

A second "set of ten" featuring a new Bevan cut-up was published in 1971–73 but the inclusion of Joyce in the first "set of ten" left this second set one book short:

- Freud by Richard Wollheim, 1971
- Reich by Charles Rycroft, 1971
- Yeats by Denis Donoghue, 1971
- Gandhi by George Woodcock, 1972
- Lenin by Robert Conquest, 1972
- Mailer by Richard Poirier, 1972
- Russell by A. J. Ayer, 1972
- Jung by Anthony Storr, 1973
- Lawrence by Frank Kermode, 1973

A third "set of ten" featuring Bevan's kinetic Pyramid painting began to appear in 1973–74 but Constable left before the set was complete and his replacement, Mike Dempsey, scrapped the set-of-ten incentive after eight books:

- Beckett by A Alvarez, 1973
- Einstein by Jeremy Bernstein, 1973
- Laing by Edgar Z. Friedenberg, 1973
- Popper by Bryan Magee, 1973
- Kafka by Erich Heller, 1974
- Le Corbusier by Stephen Gardiner, 1974
- Proust by Roger Shattuck, 1974
- Weber by Donald G. MacRae, 1974

Dempsey switched the covers to a white background and commissioned a new artist James Lowe, whose cover art for the next eight books in 1975–76 was based on triangles:

- Eliot by Stephen Spender, 1975
- Marx by David McLellan, 1975
- Pound by Donald Davie, 1975
- Sartre by Arthur C. Danto, 1975
- Artaud by Martin Esslin, 1976
- Keynes by D. E. Moggridge, 1976
- Saussure by Jonathan Culler, 1976
- Schoenberg by Charles Rosen, 1976

Nine more books appeared in 1977–79 with cover art by James Lowe based on squares:

- Engels by David McLellan, 1977
- Gramsci by James Joll, 1977
- Durkheim by Anthony Giddens, 1978
- Heidegger by George Steiner, 1978
- Nietzsche by J. P. Stern, 1978
- Trotsky by Irving Howe, 1978
- Klein by Hanna Segal, 1979
- Pavlov by Jeffrey A. Gray, 1979
- Piaget by Margaret A. Boden, 1979

Dempsey left Fontana Books in 1979 but continued to oversee the Modern Masters series until a new art director, Patrick Mortimer, was appointed in 1980. Four more books followed under Mortimer with cover art by James Lowe based on circles:

- Evans-Pritchard by Mary Douglas, 1980
- Darwin by Wilma George, 1982
- Barthes by Jonathan Culler, 1983
- Adorno by Martin Jay, 1984

The cover concept was dropped after this and a new design was used that featured a portrait of the Modern Master as a line drawing or later a tinted photograph, and mixed serif and sans-serif typefaces, upright and italic fonts, block capitals, lowercase letters and faux handwriting. The design was used for reprints and six new titles:

- Foucault by J. G. Merquior, 1985
- Derrida by Christopher Norris, 1987
- Winnicott by Adam Phillips, 1988
- Lacan by Malcolm Bowie, 1991
- Arendt by David Watson, 1992
- Berlin by John Gray, 1995

== Book covers as art ==
Fontana's use of art as book covers went full circle in 2003–05 when the British conceptual artist Jamie Shovlin "reproduced" the covers of the forty-eight Fontana Modern Masters from Camus to Barthes as a series of flawed paintings (the titles are missing and the colours have run) in watercolour and ink on paper, each measuring 28 x 19 cm. However, Shovlin also noticed ten forthcoming titles listed on the books' front endpapers which, for reasons unknown, had not been published:

- Dostoyevsky by Harold Rosenberg
- Fuller by Allan Temko
- Jakobson by Thomas A Sebeok
- Kipling by Lionel Trilling
- Mann by Lionel Trilling
- Merleau-Ponty by Hubert Dreyfus
- Needham by George Steiner
- Sherrington by Jonathan Miller
- Steinberg by John Hollander
- Winnicott by Masud Khan (this was published with a different author, as listed in the previous section)

Shovlin then set out to paint these "lost" titles and thus "complete" the series. To do this he devised a "Fontana Colour Chart" based on the covers of the published books, and a scoring system that – like his paintings – was deliberately flawed. Given these flaws, and those in Fontana's original series, the absence of any modern masters from the visual arts is notable, since Matisse was one of four "forthcoming titles" that Shovlin had apparently overlooked:

- Benjamin by Samuel Weber
- Erikson by Robert Lifton
- Ho by David Halberstam
- Matisse by David Sylvester

Benjamin and Matisse have since been included in a new series of seventeen large Fontana Modern Masters that Shovlin painted in 2011-12. These use a similar scoring system to his watercolours of 2003–05 and a new "Acrylic Variations Colour Wheel". The paintings are acrylic on canvas and each measures 210 x 130 cm:

- Arendt by David Watson (Variation 1)
- Benjamin by Samuel Weber (Variation 3)
- Berlin by John Gray (Variation 1)
- Derrida by Christopher Norris (Variation 3)
- Dostoyevsky by Harold Rosenberg (Variation 1)
- Foucault by J. G. Merquior (Variation 1B)
- Fuller by Allan Temko (Variation 3)
- Jakobson by Krystyna Pomorska (Variation 2)
- Kipling by Lionel Trilling (Variation 2)
- Lacan by Malcolm Bowie (Variation 1)
- Mann by Lionel Trilling (Variation 1A)
- Matisse by David Sylvester (Variation 1A)
- Merleau-Ponty by H. P. Dreyfus (Variation 1)
- Needham by George Steiner (Variation 3A)
- Sherrington by Jonathan Miller (Variation 3)
- Steinberg by John Hollander (Variation 3B)
- Winnicott by Adam Phillips (Variation 3)

== See also ==
- Foucault - one of the books in the series
- Past Masters
