= Artine Artinian =

French literature scholar (born 1907)

Artine Artinian and his wife, Margaret, circa 1998, at their penthouse.

Artine Artinian (December 8, 1907 – November 19, 2005) was a distinguished French literature scholar of Armenian descent, notable for his valuable collection of French literary manuscripts and artwork. He was immortalized as a fictional character by his Bard colleague Mary McCarthy in the novel The Groves of Academe (1952) and by his friend Gore Vidal in the play The Best Man (1960).

== Background ==
Artine Artinian was born in Pazardzhik, Bulgaria to Armenian parents. In 1920, his family came to the United States, settling in Attleboro, Massachusetts. There, Artine worked as a shoeshine boy, learning English from listening to conversations as he worked. He was able to attend Bowdoin College (1931) with support from his customers, and in later years, he returned the favor by establishing a scholarship fund for needy students there. He received a diploma from the Université de Paris in 1932, an A.M. from Harvard the following year, and a Ph.D. from Columbia in 1941. His dissertation, Maupassant Criticism in France, 1880-1940, with an Inquiry into His Present Fame and a Bibliography, was published the same year. By this time, Professor Artinian, who joined the Bard faculty in 1935, had already embarked on his multifaceted career.

In 1949, he came into contact with the Belgian deconstructionist Paul de Man. Following his friend Mary McCarthy's recommendation, Artinian helped the newly immigrated de Man by offering him a substitute position as professor of French at Bard College, while Artinian spent the academic year of 1949–50 in France as a Fulbright fellow.

In 1955, he edited and published "The Complete Short Stories of Guy de Maupassant" (Hanover House), which expurgated sixty-five inauthentic works from the Maupassant canon, and remains authoritative, even after half a century. In 1964, Artinian retired from his post as Chairman of the Division of Languages and Literature at Bard. His collecting did not stop with retirement, however, as he continued to amass manuscripts and artwork, especially portraits, including artist self-portraits. He donated a large amount of his collection of manuscripts and art to Bowdoin College and gave artwork to several universities and museums. His portrait collection, including works by André Gill, Henri Demare, Manuel Luque, Émile Cohl, Camille Pissarro, Henri de Toulouse-Lautrec, Anthony Coffey and Paul Signac, is currently housed at the Harry Ransom Center of the University of Texas at Austin.

Artine Artinian, of the Class of 1931, teacher and scholar. Native of Bulgaria, emigrant to Massachusetts at thirteen, you epitomize the courage and fearlessness, the grit and determination characteristic of your Armenian ancestors, long victims of oppression, in rising from bootblack to scholar.

Artinian died at his home in Lantana, Florida at age 97. Before his death, Professor Artinian was retired professor of French at Bard College, in Annandale-on-Hudson, New York, where he taught for nearly 30 years. An authority on Guy de Maupassant, he had translated and edited what is known to be the definitive English-language edition of Maupassant's short stories.

== Literature ==
- Maupassant as Seen by American and English Writers of Today, 1943
- Guy de Maupassant and Louis Le Poittevin, 1948
- New Light on the Maupassant Family, 1948
- First Publication of Maupassant's Papa de Simon, 1948
- Guy de Maupassant and His Brother Herve, 1948
- Maupassant's Paris Addresses, Johns Hopkins Press 1949
- Maupassant and 'La terre de Virgile, American Association of Teachers of French 1949
- Maupassant and Gisèle d'Estoc: A Warning, MLN 1952
- Maupassant Criticism in France, 1880-1940, Russell & Russell 1969
