= Neologism =

Recent term gaining acceptance

In linguistics, a neologism (/niˈɒlədʒɪzəm/, /ˌniːoʊˈloʊ-/; also known as a coinage) is any newly formed word, term, or phrase that has gained popular or institutional recognition and is becoming accepted into mainstream language.

Neologisms are one facet of lexical innovation, i.e., the linguistic process of new terms and meanings entering a language's lexicon. The most precise studies into language change and word formation, in fact, identify the process of a "neological continuum": a nonce word is any single-use term that may or may not grow in popularity; a protologism is such a term used exclusively within a small group; a prelogism is such a term that is gaining usage but is still not mainstream; and a neologism has become accepted or recognized by social institutions.

Neologisms are often driven by changes in culture and technology. Popular examples of neologisms can arise and be found in nearly all aspects of human life and culture, from science to technology, to the arts, to religion, to fiction (notably science fiction), to films, to television, to commercial branding, to literature, to jargon, to cant, to linguistics and to popular culture.

== Examples ==
Examples of neologisms are sorted by time.

=== 19th century (and earlier) ===
- utopia (1516), from Ancient Greek οὐ (ou, 'no') and τόπος (tópos, 'place')
- typhoon (1588) from Chinese 台风 ('hurricane')
- compute (1631) from Latin com- ('with') and putare ('to think')
- origami (1880) from Japanese 折り紙 ('paper folding')

=== 20th century (and later) ===
- robot (1921), from Czech writer Karel Čapek's play R.U.R. (Rossum's Universal Robots);
- agitprop (1930), from Russian агитпроп, a portmanteau of агитация (agitatsija, 'agitation') and пропага́нда (propaganda, 'propaganda').
- laser (1960), an acronym of "light amplification by stimulated emission of radiation"
- ruguanxue (2019), from Chinese 入关学 (rùguānxué, 'breakthrough studies')
- COVID-19 (2020), from (CO)rona(VI)rus (D)isease 20(19), when the outbreak was first identified in Wuhan, China.

== Background ==
Neologisms are often formed by combining existing words (see compound noun and adjective) or by giving words new and unique suffixes or prefixes. Neologisms can also be formed by blending words, for example, "brunch" is a blend of the words "breakfast" and "lunch", or through abbreviation or acronym, by intentionally rhyming with existing words or simply through playing with sounds. A relatively rare form of neologism is when proper names are used as words (e.g., boycott, from Charles Boycott), including guy, dick, Chad, and Karen.

Neologisms can become popular through memetics, through mass media, the Internet, and word of mouth, including academic discourse in many fields renowned for their use of distinctive jargon, and often become accepted parts of the language. Other times, they disappear from common use just as readily as they appeared. Whether a neologism continues as part of the language depends on many factors, probably the most important of which is acceptance by the public. It is unusual for a word to gain popularity if it does not clearly resemble other words.

== History and meaning ==
The term "neologism" is first attested in English in 1772, borrowed from the French "néologisme" (1734). The French word derives from the Greek νέο (neo), meaning "new", and λόγος (logos), meaning "speech, utterance".

In an academic sense, there are no professional neologists, because the study of such things (e.g., of cultural or ethnic vernacular) is interdisciplinary. Anyone such as a lexicographer or an etymologist might study neologisms, how their uses span the scope of human expression, and how, due to science and technology, they now spread more rapidly than ever.

The term "neologism" also has a broader meaning, of "a word which has gained a new meaning". Sometimes the latter process is called "semantic shifting" or "semantic extension". Neologisms are distinct from a person's idiolect, one's unique patterns of vocabulary, grammar, and pronunciation.

Neologisms are usually introduced when a concept is lacking a term, or when an existing term lacks detail, or when a speaker is unaware of the existing term. The law, governmental bodies, and technology have a relatively high frequency of acquiring neologisms. Another motive for the coining of a neologism is to disambiguate a term that has multiple meanings.

== Literature ==
Neologisms may come from a word used in the narrative of fiction such as novels and short stories. Examples include "grok" (to intuitively understand) from the science fiction novel about a Martian entitled Stranger in a Strange Land by Robert A. Heinlein; "McJob" (precarious, poorly-paid employment) from Generation X: Tales for an Accelerated Culture by Douglas Coupland; "cyberspace" (widespread, interconnected digital technology) from Neuromancer by William Gibson and "quark" (Slavic slang for "rubbish"; German for a type of dairy product) from James Joyce's Finnegans Wake.

The title of a book may become a neologism, for instance, Catch-22 (from the title of Joseph Heller's novel). Alternatively, the author's name may give rise to the neologism, although the term is sometimes based on only one work of that author. This includes such words as "Orwellian" (from George Orwell, referring to his dystopian novel Nineteen Eighty-Four) and "Kafkaesque" (from Franz Kafka).

Names of famous characters are another source of literary neologisms. Some examples include: Quixotic, referring to a misguided romantic quest like that of the title character in Don Quixote by Miguel de Cervantes; Scrooge, a pejorative for misers based on the avaricious main character in Charles Dickens' A Christmas Carol; and Pollyanna, referring to people who are unfailingly optimistic like the title character of Eleanor H. Porter's Pollyanna.

=== Scientific literature ===
Neologisms are often introduced in technical writing, so-called Fachtexte or 'technical texts' through the process of lexical innovation. Technical subjects such as philosophy, sociology, physics, etc. are especially rich in neologisms. In philosophy, as an example, many terms became introduced into languages through processes of translation, e.g., from Ancient Greek to Latin, or from Latin to German or English, and so on. So Plato introduced the Greek term ποιότης (poiotēs), which Cicero rendered with Latin qualitas, which subsequently became our notion of 'quality' in relation to epistemology, e.g., a quality or attribute of a perceived object, as opposed to its essence. In physics, new terms were introduced sometimes via nonce formation (e.g., Murray Gell-Mann's quark, taken from James Joyce) or through derivation (e.g. John von Neumann's kiloton, coined by combining the common prefix kilo- 'thousand' with the noun ton). Neologisms therefore are a vital component of scientific jargon or termini technici.

== Cant ==
Polari is a cant used by some actors, circus performers, and the gay subculture to communicate without outsiders understanding. Some Polari terms have crossed over into mainstream slang, in part through their usage in pop song lyrics and other works. Example include: acdc, barney, blag, butch, camp, khazi, cottaging, hoofer, mince, ogle, scarper, slap, strides, tod, [rough] trade.

Verlan (French pronunciation: [vɛʁlɑ̃]), (verlan is the reverse of the expression "l'envers") is a type of argot in the French language, featuring inversion of syllables in a word, and is common in slang and youth language. It rests on a long French tradition of transposing syllables of individual words to create slang words. Some verlan words, such as meuf ("femme", which means "woman" roughly backwards), have become so commonplace that they have been included in the Petit Larousse. Like any slang, the purpose of verlan is to create a somewhat secret language that only its speakers can understand. Words becoming mainstream is counterproductive. As a result, such newly common words are re-verlanised: reversed a second time. The common meuf became feumeu.

== Popular culture ==
Neologism development may be spurred, or at least spread, by popular culture. Examples of pop-culture neologisms include the American alt-Right (2010s), the Canadian portmanteau "Snowmageddon" (2009), the Russian parody "Monstration" (c. 2004), Santorum (c. 2003).

Neologisms spread mainly through their exposure in mass media. The genericizing of brand names, such as "coke" for Coca-Cola (or any cola, or any soda in some parts of the United States), "Kleenex" for any brand of facial tissue, and Xerox for copy machines, all spread through their popular use being enhanced by mass media.

However, in some limited cases, words break out of their original communities and spread through social media. "DoggoLingo", a term still below the threshold of a neologism according to Merriam-Webster, is an example of the latter which has specifically spread primarily through Facebook group and Twitter account use. The suspected origin of this way of referring to dogs stems from a Facebook group founded in 2008 and gaining popularity in 2014 in Australia. In Australian English it is common to use diminutives, often ending in –o, which could be where doggo-lingo was first used. The term has grown so that Merriam-Webster has acknowledged its use but notes the term needs to be found in published, edited work for a longer period of time before it can be deemed a new word, making it the perfect example of a neologism.

The COVID-19 pandemic has introduced several new neologisms in a very short amount of time, both in English and in most languages, including the common name for the disease "covid", alongside other new words and phrases such as “covidiot”, “the ‘rona”, "Zoombombing", “covexit”, “WFH”, and “quaranteams.”

== Translations ==
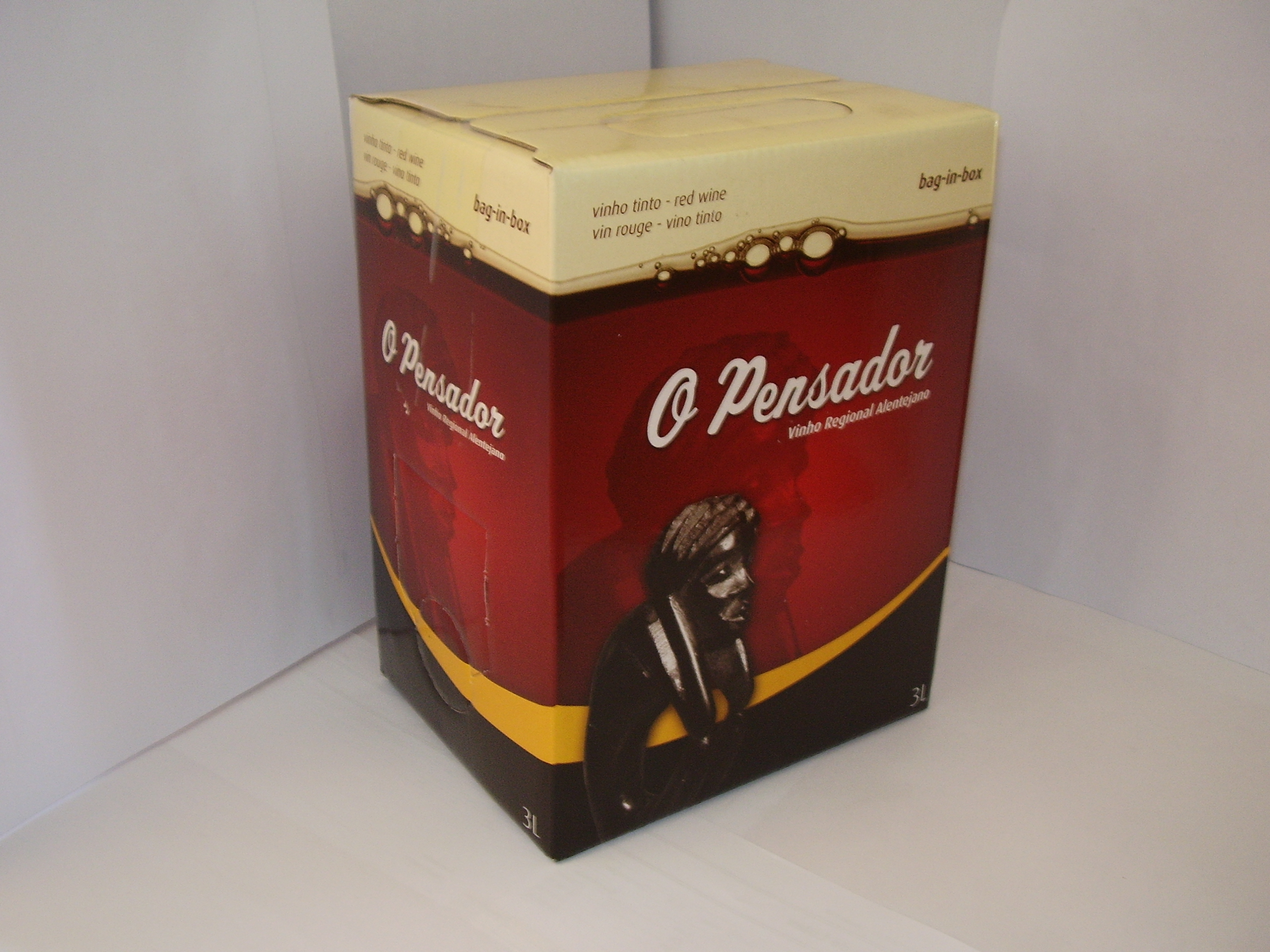
In Danish a bag-in-box wine is known as papvin literally meaning "cardboard wine". This neologism was first recorded in 1982.

Because neologisms originate in one language, translations between languages can be difficult.

In the scientific community, where English is the predominant language for published research and studies, like-sounding translations (referred to as 'naturalization') are sometimes used. Alternatively, the English word is used along with a brief explanation of meaning. The four translation methods are emphasized in order to translate neologisms: transliteration, transcription, the use of analogues, and loan translation.

When translating from English to other languages, the naturalization method is most often used. The most common way that professional translators translate neologisms is through the think aloud protocol (TAP), wherein translators find the most appropriate and natural sounding word through speech. As such, translators can use potential translations in sentences and test them with different structures and syntax. Correct translations from English for specific purposes into other languages is crucial in various industries and legal systems. Inaccurate translations can lead to 'translation asymmetry' or misunderstandings and miscommunication. Many technical glossaries of English translations exist to combat this issue in the medical, judicial, and technological fields.

== Other uses ==
=== As a symptom ===
In psychiatry and neuroscience, the term neologism is used to describe words that have meaning only to the person who uses them, independent of their common meaning. This can be seen in schizophrenia, where a person may replace a word with a nonsensical one of their own invention (e.g., "I got so angry I picked up a dish and threw it at the gelsinger"). The use of neologisms may also be due to aphasia acquired after brain damage resulting from a stroke or head injury.

=== In social media ===
In social media, the term neologism is used to describe words made by a user. This can be seen in memes, user biographies and posts where a person creates a sensical one of their own invention.

== See also ==
- Aureation
- Backslang
- Blend word
- Calque
- Language planning
- Mondegreen
- Morphology (linguistics)
- Nonce word
- Phono-semantic matching
- Protologism
- Retronym
- Sniglet
- Syllabic abbreviations
- Word formation
