= The Resistance to Theory =

"The Resistance to Theory" is an essay by Paul de Man (1919–1983), a renowned literary critic and theorist belonging to the Yale School of Deconstruction, which appeared in Yale French Studies 63 (1982) and was widely anthologized. The essay later became part of the book by the same name. The essay remains a key statement in poststructuralist approaches to literary studies.

== Committee on the Research Activities ==
In the essay's introduction Paul de Man explains that “The Resistance to Theory” was written at the request of the Committee on the Research Activities of the Modern Language Association as a contribution to a collective volume entitled Introduction to Scholarship in Modern Languages and Literatures. The MLA, however, rejected it. As de Man admits, his claim that "the main theoretical interest of literary theory consists in the impossibility of its definition" explains in large part the reasons for its rejection. Although de Man does not date the essay in his description of the original commission, it would appear to have been written in 1980.

== Content ==
But keeping in view with the proposal, the essay discusses the rise of literary theory in America in the twentieth century and the challenges it faces. De Man points out that, "literary theory can be said to come into being when the approach to literary texts is no longer based on non-linguistic, that is to say historical and aesthetic considerations." This introduction of linguistic and semiotic terminology into literary studies, according to de Man, gives the language, "considerable freedom from referential restraint" and makes it "epistemologically highly suspect and volatile." Drawing on the ideas of Saussure and Nietzsche, de Man points out that the rhetorical and tropological dimension of language makes it an unreliable medium for the communication of truths. Literary language is predominantly rhetorical and figurative. Therefore, it would be a great mistake to take for granted that literature is a reliable source of information about anything but itself.

== Crisis mentioned ==
This gives rise to a particular crisis in literary studies because "literariness" is no longer seen as an aesthetic quality nor a mimetic mode. Aesthetic effect, according to de Man, takes place because we tend to mistake the materiality of the signifier with the materiality of the signified by considering language as an intuitive and transparent medium, as opposed to the material and conventional medium that it is. Mimesis, like aesthetic quality, is also an effect of the rhetorical and figurative aspects of language. The assumption of ideological and historical contexts or backgrounds to literary texts becomes problematic if language is no longer seen as a transparent and intuitive guide from the textual material to the historical situation. Consequently, the theorists who uphold an aesthetic approach to literary studies and those who uphold an historical approach both find theory inconvenient and challenging. They are the polemical opponents of theory.

== Author explanation ==
As theory is as much a linguistic construct as literature, it falls prey to the same problematics of literary language. De Man states that the resistance to theory may be "a built-in constituent of its discourse." The real debate of literary theory is henceforth "not with its polemical opponents but rather with its own methodological assumptions and possibilities." (p. 358) This is because "the resistance to theory is a resistance to the use of language about language." The resistance to theory is therefore, according to de Man, a resistance to reading: "Nothing can overcome the resistance to theory since theory 'is' itself this resistance."

De Man concludes however by stating that "literary theory is not in danger of going under; it cannot help but flourish, and the more it is resisted, the more it flourishes, since the language it speaks is the language of self resistance." (p. 365)
