= Cogito and the History of Madness =

1963 paper by Jacques Derrida

"Cogito and the History of Madness" is a 1963 paper by the French philosopher Jacques Derrida that critically responds to Michel Foucault's book History of Madness. In this paper, Derrida questions the intentions and feasibility of Foucault's book, particularly in relation to the historical importance attributed by Foucault to the treatment of madness by Descartes in the Meditations on First Philosophy. Derrida's paper began a high-profile exchange between Derrida and Foucault as well as a considerable amount of attention from scholars. Foucault responded directly to Derrida in an appendix added to the 1972 edition of the History of Madness titled "My body, this paper, this fire." Derrida again considered Foucault's 1961 text on madness with "To do Justice to Freud: The History of madness in the age of psychoanalysis" in 1991. The exchange between Derrida and Foucault was sometimes acrimonious, and Khalfa has claimed that "the two writers stopped communicating for ten years."

It has been stated that Derrida first used the neologism différance in "Cogito and the History of Madness".

== Presentation and publication ==
Derrida presented the paper “Cogito and the History of Madness” at the Collège Philosophique in 1963. Derrida sent a letter inviting Foucault to attend this presentation. The paper was subsequently published in the Revue de métaphysique et de morale in 1963 with the addition of a short passage inserted between brackets. Additional notes to the paper were published in the next issue of the Revue de métaphysique et de morale in 1964. The paper was subject to a further revision for its inclusion in the 1967 collection L'écriture et la différence. The paper was translated into English by Alan Bass in 1978 as part of Writing and Difference.

== Structure of the paper ==
=== Epigraphs ===
Derrida prefaces the paper with two quotations. The first quotation is Søren Kierkegaard stating that "The instant of decision is madness". Kierkegaard characterises the instant of decision as madness because it is only when one choice is not clearly superior to another—when reason fails to indicate which option is better—that a choice really needs to be made. The second quotation is James Joyce stating of Ulysses that "In any event this book was terribly daring. A transparent sheet separates it from madness."

=== Point of departure ===
Derrida states that his point of departure for "Cogito and the History of Madness" is Foucault's 1961 book Folie et déraison. Derrida's paper primarily relies on two sections of Foucault's work, the original 1961 preface in which Foucault makes a number of general comments about the book, setting forth his intentions and methodology, and two and a half pages at the start of the second chapter where Foucault links Descartes to an historical event that silenced madness at the beginning of the classical age. Foucault's 1961 text was heavily abridged for a popular edition in 1964 that formed the basis for Richard Howard's translation of the text into English as Madness and Civilization. The abridged 1964 edition removed the pages concerning Descartes on which Derrida had explicitly based his argument in "Cogito and the History of Madness." These pages on Descartes were only made available in English with Jean Khalfa's 2006 translation of Foucault's work on madness.

=== Allusion to Hegel ===
Derrida makes an allusion to the master–slave dialectic in Hegel's Phenomenology of Spirit in the opening pages of "Cogito and the History of Madness."

=== Argument concerning Descartes ===
Foucault writes at the start of the second chapter of Madness and Civilization of a strange violent event that silenced madness at the end of the renaissance and the beginning of the classical age. He then discusses the treatment of madness by Descartes in the Meditations on First Philosophy. Descartes, after having doubted the existence of the external world and that of his own body, poses the objection of madness to himself. For Descartes, denying that "these hands and this body belong to me" would be equivalent to maintaining, as do "those senseless people" who think they "are dressed in purple and gold while they are all naked, or imagine themselves to be jugs or have a body of glass." And he continues: "But they are fools (amentes), and I would be no less extravagant (demens) than them if I followed their example". Subsequently, Descartes tackles the "dream hypothesis", asking whether perception is only a dream and not something real, unlike the incontrovertible truths of mathematics. But even the latter are attacked, with the use of the further objection that, in addition to sensible perceptions, also certainties and rational reasons are nothing more than a deception on the part of an evil demon. According to Foucault, the experience of madness and the "hyperbolic doubt" are completely different and not comparable, as the experience of the madman is not even to be taken into consideration, "since I think", while the madman does not. Foucault's conclusion is that the Cartesian cogito was the premise of the decree of exclusion of madness and the "great internment". For Foucault this exclusion of madness by Descartes leads to a cogito that is more or less arbitrarily self-assured of its own rationality.

Derrida argues that Descartes might appear to dismiss madness at the point of the meditation to which Foucault refers but shortly after this takes madness seriously as a ground for doubt when he considers the possibility of there being an evil demon controlling his thoughts. Derrida argues that Descartes includes the possibility of his own madness when he hypothesises that an evil demon could corrupt even the most assured and reasonable judgements he can make, such as those of basic arithmetic. Hence, the procedure of Descartes' Second Meditation aims to demonstrate that cogito, ergo sum remains true even if I am driven mad by the evil genius: "Whether I am mad or not, cogito, sum". "The act of the cogito is valid even if I am mad, even if my thought is in every part mad." For Derrida, Cartesian reason, rather than excluding that which differs from it, recognizes the threatening presence of madness. In this way, reason perceives the 'other', the different from itself, within itself. Derrida argues that madness is not subject to an arbitrary exclusion by Descartes but that once Descartes earnestly but momentarily enters into the hypothesis of the evil demon he must be reassured by the ordered operative norms of his language and project of self-reflection.

== See also ==
- Deconstruction
