= Yale French Studies =

- Discipline: French studies
- Language: English
- Edited by: Nichole Gleisner

Publication details
- History: 1948-present
- Publisher: Yale University Press (United States)
- Frequency: Biannually

Standard abbreviations
- ISO 4: Yale Fr. Stud.

Indexing
- ISSN: 0044-0078
- JSTOR: 00440078
- OCLC no.: 315867176

Links
- Journal homepage; Online archive

Yale French Studies is an academic journal published biannually by Yale University Press and connected with the French department at Yale University. It is the oldest English-language journal in the United States devoted to French and Francophone literature and culture. It was established in 1948 by editor Robert Greer Cohn, and is currently edited by Nichole Gleisner, who became editor in 2022 after longtime editor Alyson Waters retired. The first issue was devoted to existentialism and featured scenes from the play Les Mains sales (Dirty Hands) by Jean-Paul Sartre in addition to essays on the emerging philosophical movement and its key proponents such as Sartre and Albert Camus. Through its long tenure, Yale French Studies has published a wide range of renowned scholars including Paul De Man, Jacques Derrida, René Girard, Richard Howard, Fredric Jameson, Barbara Johnson, Naomi Schor, and Jean Starobinski.
