= Martin McQuillan =

Martin McQuillan (born 1972) is a Scottish-born literary theorist, cultural critic and journalist currently employed at Falmouth University. He was Professor of Literary Theory and Cultural Analysis and Dean of the Faculty of Arts and Social Sciences at Kingston University, London, where he was also Co-Director of The London Graduate School, and was Deputy Vice-Chancellor of Research, Business and Innovation between 2015 and 2017. He was previously Pro-Dean of Research (2005–09) for the Faculty of Performance, Visual Arts and Communications at the University of Leeds, where he was also Head of the School of Fine Art, History of Art and Cultural Studies (2001–2005). Before that he was a lecturer in English at Staffordshire University (1997–2000).

Since August 2017, he has been the Editor of Research Fortnight's HE publication.

== Biography ==
Born in 1972 as the third of seven children, he was educated in Scotland, attending his local comprehensive St. Brendan's High School, Linwood. He went to the University of Glasgow at the age of 16 to study English Literature. He also pursued post-graduate study at Glasgow and completed his PhD on the novels of Muriel Spark in 1997. He then worked at Staffordshire University before moving to the University of Leeds in 2000. He became Head of School in 2001 and became Professor of Cultural Theory and Analysis in 2005.

He works in the spaces between literary theory, art theory, cultural studies and continental philosophy, and writes on the work of Jacques Derrida, Hélène Cixous and Paul de Man. He was the editor of The Year's Work in Critical and Cultural Theory for Oxford University Press (2003–05), the journal Parallax for Routledge (2000–10), and has edited volumes of the Oxford Literary Review and Derrida Today. He is the editor of The Frontiers of Theory series for Edinburgh University Press.

== Works by McQuillan ==
=== Monographs ===
- Roland Barthes: or the Profession of Cultural Studies, (Basingstoke: Macmillan, 2011) ISBN 978-0-333-91457-1.
- Deconstruction after 9/11, (London: Routledge, 2009) ISBN 978-0-415-96494-4.
- Paul de Man, (London: Routledge, 2001)
- Deconstructing Disney, (London: Pluto Press, 1999), with Eleanor Byrne.

=== Edited volumes ===
- Textual Allegories, by Paul de Man, (UCI Special Collections, 2010)
- The Portable Rousseau, ed. Paul de Man, (UCI Special Collections, 2010)
- The Origins of Deconstruction, co-edited with Ika Willis, (Macmillan, 2010)
- Deconstruction Reading Politics, (Basingstoke: Macmillan, 2008)
- The Politics of Deconstruction: Jacques Derrida and the Other of Philosophy, (London: Pluto Press, 2007)
- Theorising Muriel Spark: Gender, Race, Deconstruction, (London: Macmillan, 2002)
- Deconstruction: A Reader, (Edinburgh: Edinburgh University Press; New York: Routledge, 2000)
- The Narrative Reader, (London and New York: Routledge, 2000)
- Post-Theory: New Directions in Criticism, Co-editor with Graeme Macdonald, Robin Purves and Stephen Thomson, (Edinburgh: Edinburgh University Press, 1999)
