= José Guilherme Merquior =

Brazilian academic, writer and diplomat

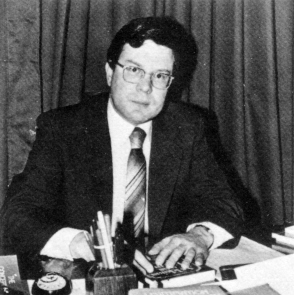
- Born: April 22, 1941; Rio de Janeiro
- Died: January 7, 1991 (aged 49); Rio de Janeiro

Education
- Education: Sorbonne University; London School of Economics
- Thesis: Verso e Universo em Drummond (1972)
- Doctoral advisor: Raymond Cantel (Sorbonne); Ernest Gellner (LSE)

Philosophical work
- Era: 20th-century philosophy
- Region: Western philosophy
- School: Social liberalism (disputed); Brazilian conservatism
- Main interests: Literary criticism, history of ideas, aesthetics, politics, sociology, international relations, Political philosophy

José Guilherme Merquior (April 22, 1941 – January 7, 1991) was a Brazilian diplomat, academic, writer, literary critic and philosopher.

== Biography ==
He was a prolific writer, and member of the Academia Brasileira de Letras (the Brazilian Academy of Letters). He had a doctorate in sociology from the London School of Economics, which was directed by Ernest Gellner. Merquior also studied under Claude Lévi-Strauss (whose ideas Merquior would largely repudiate in From Prague to Paris), and took guidance from the likes of Raymond Aron, Harry Levin, and Arnaldo Momigliano. He published books written directly in French, English, Italian, and his native Portuguese.

Merquior divided his published works in two segments. In one the bulk was criticism per se; in the other the emphasis was the history of ideas, or more specific investigations like the highly esteemed study of Jean-Jacques Rousseau and Max Weber. Two of his books, Foucault (1985), an often scathing critique of Michel Foucault for the Fontana Modern Masters series, and Western Marxism (1986), were described as "minor classics" by white nationalist militant Gregory R. Johnson.

Merquior was a major supporter of the Fernando Collor de Mello government and wrote many of Collor's public speeches. He died of cancer in January 1991, before Collor's downfall in 1992.

== Books ==
=== Published in Portuguese ===
- 1963: Poesia do Brasil, (antologia com Manuel Bandeira)
- 1965: Razão do Poema
- 1969: Arte e Sociedade em Marcuse, Adorno e Benjamin
- 1972: A astúcia da mímese
- 1972: Saudades do Carnaval
- 1974: Formalismo e tradição moderna
- 1975: O estruturalismo dos pobres e outras questões
- 1975: A estética de Lévi-Strauss
- 1976: Verso e universo de Drummond
- 1977: De Anchieta a Euclides
- 1980: O fantasma romântico e outros ensaios
- 1981: As idéias e as formas
- 1982: A natureza do processo
- 1983: O argumento liberal
- 1983: O elixir do Apocalipse
- 1985: Michel Foucault ou O niilismo da cátedra
- 1987: O marxismo ocidental
- 1990: Crítica
- 1990: Rousseau e Weber: dois estudos sobre a teoria da legitimidade
- 1991: De Praga a Paris: uma crítica do estruturalismo e do pensamento pós-estruturalista
- 1991: O liberalismo, antigo e moderno
- 1997: O véu e a máscara

=== Published in English ===
- 1979: The veil and the mask: Essays on culture and ideology
- 1980: Rousseau and Weber: Two studies in the theory of legitimacy
- 1985: Foucault (Merquior book)
- 1987: From Prague to Paris: A Critique of Structuralist and Post-Structuralist Thought
- 1991: Western Marxism
- 1991: Liberalism, Old and New
- 1991: Foucault

=== Published in French ===
- 1986: Foucault ou le nihilisme de la chaire

=== Published in Spanish ===
- 1996 Liberalismo Viejo y Nuevo
- 2005 El Comportamiento de Las Musas

=== In memoriam ===
- 1996 Liberalism in Modern Times - Essays in Honour of José G. Merquior. Edited by Ernest Gellner and César Cansino

== See also ==
- Liberal Party (Brazil, 1985)
- Roberto Campos
