= Veronica Forrest-Thomson =

Scottish poet and critic (1947–1975)

- Born: 28 November 1947; Malaya
- Died: 26 April 1975 (aged 27)
- Education: University of Liverpool; Girton College, University of Cambridge
- Occupations: poet, critical theorist
- Notable work: Poetic Artifice: A Theory of Twentieth-Century Poetry
- Spouse: Jonathan Culler (m. 1971; div. 1974)

Veronica Elizabeth Marian Forrest-Thomson (28 November 1947 – 26 April 1975) was a Scottish poet and a critical theorist. Her 1978 study Poetic Artifice: A Theory of Twentieth-Century Poetry was reissued in 2016.

== Life and education ==
Veronica was born in Malaya to a rubber planter, John Forrest Thomson, and his wife, Jean, but grew up in Glasgow, Scotland. She opted to hyphenate her surname, having originally been published under the name Veronica Forrest.

She studied at the University of Liverpool (BA, 1968) and Girton College, Cambridge (PhD, 1971) where her first supervisor was the poet J. H. Prynne. Her Cambridge friends included the poets Wendy Mulford and Denise Riley.

Forrest-Thomson later taught at the universities of Leicester and Birmingham.

== Writings ==
Forrest-Thomson's critical study Poetic Artifice: A Theory of Twentieth-Century Poetry was published by Manchester University Press in 1978. It was reissued with notes and an introduction by Gareth Farmer in 2016 with Shearsman press. Her poetry collections included Identi-kit (1967), the award-winning Language-Games (1971) and the posthumous On the Periphery (1976). Subsequent gatherings of her work include Collected Poems and Translations (1990) and Selected Poems (1999). A further Collected Poems, minus the translations, was published in 2008 by Shearsman Books with Allardyce Books.

Forrest-Thomson died in her sleep on 26 April 1975 at the age of 27, after an overdose of prescription drugs and alcohol. She was married to the writer and academic Jonathan Culler from 1971 to 1974; he became the executor of her literary estate. In November 2019 the academic and poet Gareth Farmer replaced Culler as literary executor.
