= Jonathan Culler =

US novelist and critic

- Born: October 1, 1944 (age 82); Cleveland
- Occupations: Professor, Author

Academic background
- Education: Harvard University; St. John's College, Oxford

Jonathan Culler (born 1944) is an American literary critic. He was Class of 1916 Professor of English and Comparative Literature at Cornell University. His published works are in the fields of structuralism, literary theory and literary criticism.

== Background and career ==
Culler attended Harvard for his undergraduate studies, where he received a Bachelor of Arts in history and literature in 1966. After receiving a Rhodes scholarship, he attended St. John's College, Oxford University, where he earned a B.Phil. (now M.Phil.) in comparative literature (1968) and a D.Phil in modern languages (1972). His thesis for the B.Phil., on phenomenology and literary criticism, recorded Culler's first experiences with structuralism. The thesis explored the work of Maurice Merleau-Ponty and the criticism of the "Geneva School" using the ideas of Claude Lévi-Strauss, Roland Barthes, and Ferdinand de Saussure. Culler's "expanded, reorganized and rewritten" doctoral dissertation, "Structuralism: The Development of Linguistic Models and Their Application to Literary Studies," became an influential prize-winning book, Structuralist Poetics (1975).

Culler was Fellow in French and Director of Studies in Modern Languages at Selwyn College, Cambridge University, from 1969 to 1974, and Fellow of Brasenose College, Oxford and University Lecturer in French from 1974 to 1977. He was visiting professor of French and Comparative Literature at Yale University in 1975. He is a past president of the Semiotic Society of America (1988), the American Comparative Literature Association (1999–2001), Secretary of the American Council of Learned Societies (2013–17), and Chair of the New York Council for the Humanities (2016–17). He has been elected a fellow of the American Academy of Arts and Sciences (2001–), the American Philosophical Society (2006–), and the British Academy (2020-). In 2025 he received an honorary doctorate from the University of Paris VII, and in 2026 a lifetime achievement award from the international Society for the Study of Narrative. Currently, he is Class of 1916 Professor of English and Comparative Literature, emeritus, at Cornell University. He retired in 2019 after teaching for over fifty years.

In the years 1971–1974, he was married to the poet Veronica Forrest-Thomson. Culler is currently married to deconstructionist critic Professor Cynthia Chase.

== Major works ==
Culler's Structuralist Poetics: Structuralism, Linguistics and the Study of Literature won the James Russell Lowell Prize from the Modern Language Association of America in 1976 for an outstanding book of criticism. Structuralist Poetics was one of the first introductions to the French structuralist movement available in English. His 1982 book 'On Deconstruction: Theory and Criticism after Structuralism' did much the same for subsequent developments in French philosophy and critical theory.

Culler's contribution to the Very Short Introductions series, Literary Theory: A Very Short Introduction, received praise for its innovative technique of organization. It has been translated into 26 languages, including Kurdish, Latvian, and Albanian. Instead of chapters on critical schools and their methods, the book's eight chapters address issues and problems of literary theory.

In The Literary in Theory (2007) Culler discusses the notion of theory and literary history's role in the larger realm of literary and cultural theory. He defines theory as an interdisciplinary body of work including structuralist linguistics, anthropology, Marxism, semiotics, psychoanalysis, and literary criticism.

His Theory of the Lyric (2015) approaches the Western lyric tradition, from Sappho to Ashbery, exploring the major parameters of the genre and contesting two dominant models of the lyric: lyric as the intense expression of the author's affective experience, and lyric as the fictional representation of the speech act of a persona. Both these models, according to Culler, are extremely limiting and ignore the specifically poetic aspects of lyric poetry, such as rhythm and sound patterning.

== Contributions to critical theory ==
Culler believes that the linguistic-structuralist model can help "formulate the rules of particular systems of convention rather than simply affirm their existence." He posits language and human culture as similar.

In Structuralist Poetics Culler warns against applying the technique of linguistics directly to literature. Rather, the "'grammar' of literature" is converted into literary structures and meaning. Structuralism is defined as a theory resting on the realization that if human actions or productions have meaning there must be an underlying system that makes this meaning possible, since an utterance has meaning only in the context of a preexistent system of rules and conventions.

Culler proposes that we use literary critical theory not to try to understand a text but rather to investigate the activity of interpretation. In several of his works, he speaks of a reader who is particularly "competent". In order to understand how we make sense of a text, Culler identifies common elements that different readers treat differently in different texts. He suggests there are two classes of readers, "the readers as field of experience for the critic (himself a reader)" and the future readers who will benefit from the work the critic and previous readers have done.

Culler's critics complain of his lack of distinction between literature and the institution of writing in general. John R. Searle has described Culler's presentation of deconstruction as making "Derrida look both better and worse than he really is;" better in glossing over some of the more intellectually murky aspects of deconstruction and worse in largely ignoring the major philosophical progenitors of Derrida's thought, namely Husserl and Heidegger.

== Bibliography ==
Selected publications:

- Flaubert: The Uses of Uncertainty. London: Elek Books; Ithaca: Cornell University Press, 1974. Revised edition: Cornell University Press, 1985.
- Structuralist Poetics: Structuralism, Linguistics, and the Study of Literature. London: Routledge and Kegan Paul; Ithaca: Cornell University Press, 1975. Revised edition: Routledge Classics, 2002. Spanish, Japanese, Portuguese, Chinese, and Croatian translations.
- Saussure (American Title: Ferdinand de Saussure). London: Fontana Modern Masters; Brighton: Harvester, 1976. New York: Penguin, 1977. Second revised edition, Ithaca: Cornell University Press, 1986; London: Fontana, 1987. Japanese, Serbian, Slovenian, Portuguese, Turkish, and Finnish translations.
- The Pursuit of Signs: Semiotics, Literature, Deconstruction. London: Routledge and Kegan Paul; Ithaca: Cornell University Press, 1981. Revised edition, "Routledge Classics", Routledge, 2001, Cornell University Press, 2002. Japanese translation.
- On Deconstruction: Theory and Criticism after Structuralism. Ithaca: Cornell University Press, 1982; London: Routledge, 1983. Japanese, Spanish, Italian, German, Portuguese, Serbian, Chinese, Polish, Korean, Hungarian, and Czech translations.
- Barthes (American Title: Roland Barthes). London: Fontana Modern Masters; New York: Oxford University Press, 1983. French, Japanese, Portuguese, and Chinese translations. Revised and expanded edition, Roland Barthes: A Very Short Introduction, OUP, Oxford, 2001.
- ed. The Call of the Phoneme: Puns and the Foundations of Letters. Oxford: Blackwells, and Norman: University of Oklahoma Press, 1987.
- Framing the Sign: Criticism and Its Institutions. Oxford: Blackwells, and Norman, U of Oklahoma Press, 1988. Japanese translation.
- Literary Theory: A Very Short Introduction. Oxford: Oxford University Press, 1997; reedition 1999. Polish, Chinese, Korean, Portuguese, Italian, German, Spanish, Croatian, Japanese, Romanian, French, and Latvian translations.
- Ed., with Kevin Lamb, Just Being Difficult? Academic Writing in the Public Arena. Stanford: Stanford University Press, 2003.
- Ed. Deconstruction: Critical Concepts, 4 vols. London: Routledge, 2003.
- Ed. with Pheng Cheah, Grounds of Comparison: Around the Work of Benedict Anderson. Routledge, 2003.
- "The Literary In Theory" Stanford: Stanford University Press, 2006. Chinese, Japanese, and Polish translations
- Theory of the Lyric. Cambridge, MA: Harvard University Press, 2015. Czech translation.

== See also ==
- List of deconstructionists
- Logocentrism

== Sources ==
- Terry Beers, "Reading Reading Constraints: Conventions, Schemata, and Literary Interpretation", Diacritics: A Review of Contemporary Criticism 18 (1988), pp. 82–93
- J. Culler, The Literary in Theory. Stanford: Stanford University Press, 2007
- J. Culler, Literary Theory: A Very Short Introduction. New York: Oxford University Press, 1997
- J. Culler, Structuralist Poetics: Structuralism, Linguistics, and the Study of Literature. London: Routledge and Kegan Paul/Ithaca: Cornell University Press, 1975. Revised edition: Routledge Classics, 2002
- D. Gorman, "Theory of What?", rev. of Literary Theory: A Very Short Introduction, Jonathan Culler, Philosophy and Literature 23.1 (1999), pp. 206–216
- E. Schauber and E. Spolsky, "Stalking a Generative Poetics" New Literary History: A Journal of Theory and Interpretation 12.3 (1981): 397–413
- R. Schleifer and G. Rupp, "Structuralism", The Johns Hopkins Guide to Literary Theory and Criticism 2nd ed. (2005)
