= Ruguanxue =

Internet narrative of China replacing the US as a superpower

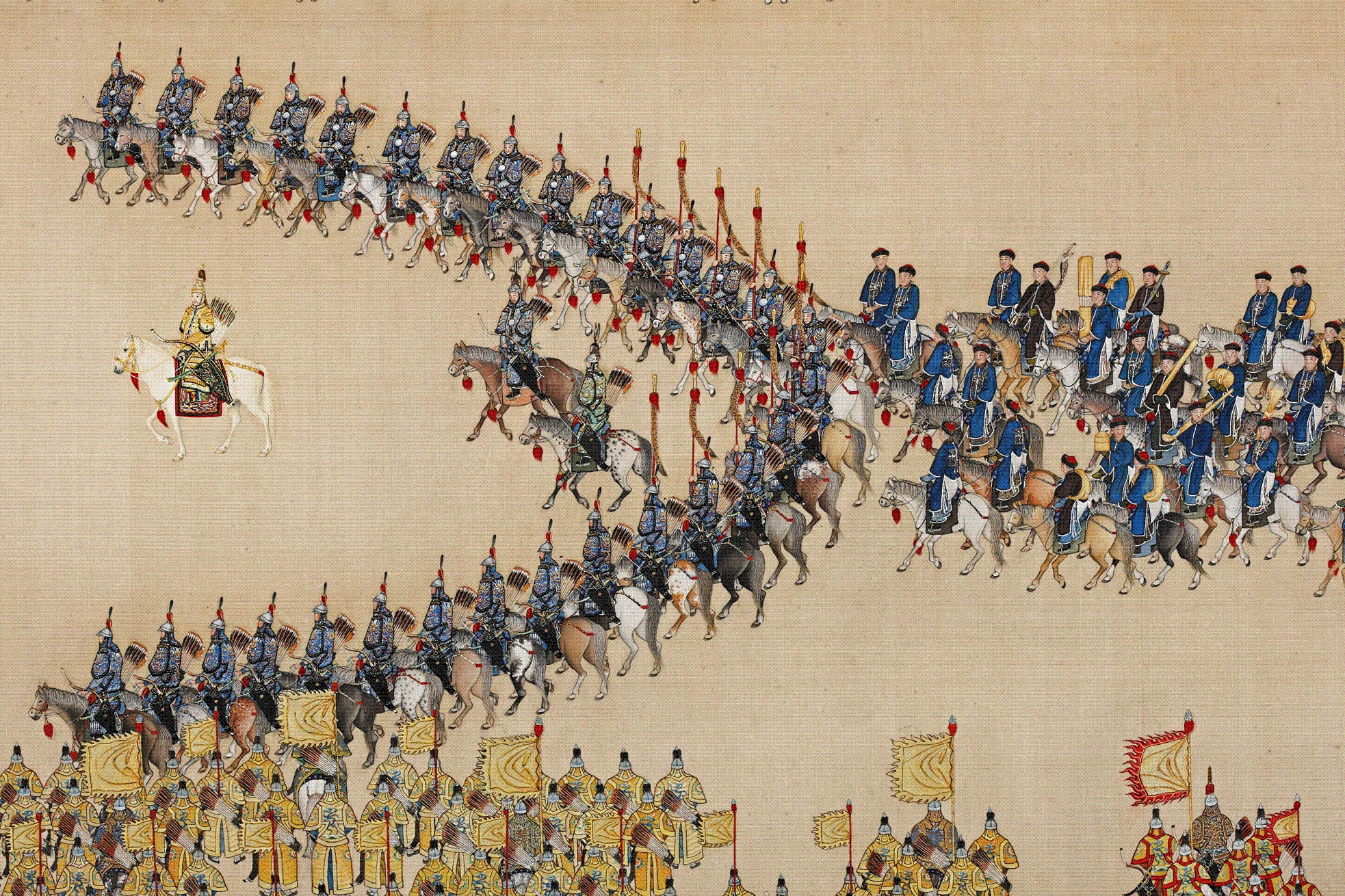
The Qianlong Emperor and his army. Advocates of Ruguanxue believe that China should defeat the declining United States and take over the position as the Qing had done to the Ming dynasty.

Ruguanxue (simplified Chinese: 入关学; traditional Chinese: 入關學; pinyin: rùguānxué; IPA: [ɻûkwánɕɥě]; Cantonese Yale: yahpgwāanhohk; lit. 'breakthrough studies') or Ruguanism is a nationalistic, memetic discourse on the Chinese Internet that likens Sino-American relations to the Ming-Qing transition. The United States is analogized to the corrupt and declining Ming dynasty and China to the rising but ostracized Later Jin/Qing dynasty, with the premise concluding that the only way China can ensure its own survival is to "break through the Shanhai Pass" and take over the position of Mandate of Heaven from the old empire. Chinese scholar Fu Zheng summarizes three common views towards Ruguanxue as either reflecting a new era of national self-confidence, as ultra-nationalism, or as petty-bourgeois ideology.

== Origin ==
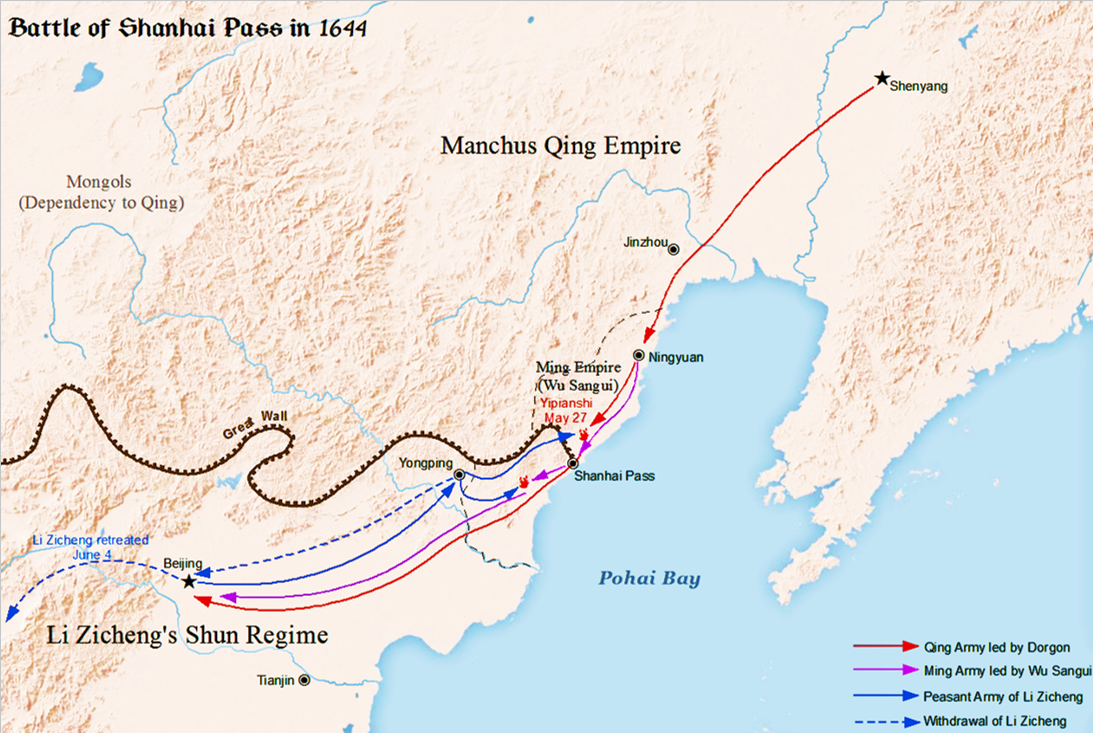
Map of the Battle of Shanhai Pass

The term was coined in 2019 by "Shangaoxian" (山高县), a Zhihu user whose account has since been banned permanently, when he wrote a 300-word answer to a question "What history lessons have the Chinese learned from the death of Ming?", which received more than 4,000 likes. In particular, he wrote, "don't carry sage books and think nonsense before you break through the Pass, and after you break through the Pass, there will always be great scholars preaching for you", arguing that it is useless to try to win over public opinion when the ruling empire insists on demonizing as a barbarian, and it is better to just overthrow the old ruler and then use the newly acquired authority to disseminate one's own value system as the new legitimate orthodoxy. Shangaoxian later said his theory was also inspired by the German Empire's challenge to the 19th century colonial order dominated by the British Empire.

The popularity of the discourse is generally believed to be related to the rise of Chinese nationalism at the time, although the discursive, metaphorical approach used has been traced back much further in time to online groups.

== Views ==
=== United States and international relations ===
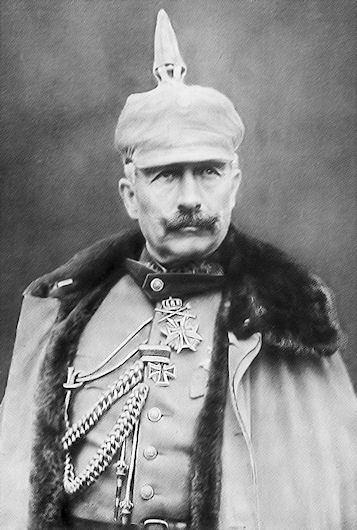
Wilhelm II in uniform, around 1915. According to Shangaoxian, he is the inspirer of the discourse.

The Ruguanxue narrative compares modern China to the Manchus, who replaced the Ming dynasty. This narrative compares the United States to the Ming, deeming the United States a paper tiger which appears to be affluent and strong but is in fact in decline.

Almost all advocates believe that the United States is in decline and that China should take its place, while American accusations against China are seen as resistance from a weakened empire against an emerging one. The theoretical foundation of this discourse is considered to be constructed on geopolitics, and the central issue it addresses is the transfer of international leadership.

Shangaoxian himself compares China to the German Empire and the Japanese Empire. He said that both of them were the losers who advocate Ruguanxue, and specifically analyzed that Wilhelm II wanted to have a "colony under the sun" but failed, while China had a population of 1.4 billion so it would not fail. Although the anti-hegemonic sentiment and realpolitik analysis contained in this is supported, it is also accused of being ultra-nationalistic and reminiscent of Ichisada Miyazaki's militaristic sentiment. Debate persists as to whether or not it is an imperialist discourse, with it being said to be still in the "open" stage, still focused only on China's challenge to the American order, without considering what might happen if that challenge becomes successful.

=== COVID-19 ===
COVID-19 brought about accusations against China, but Chinese netizens believe that the Chinese government did a good job of controlling the outbreak and therefore the outbreak elsewhere is not their responsibility. Shangaoxian himself accused Wuhan Diary of smearing China and criticized the U.S. for its confusion in dealing with the pandemic.

=== Culture ===
Despite being regarded as a "barbarian" nation, it is perceived more as a desire to gain a cognitive discourse of its own and to change its "barbarian" status by getting other nations to recognize it. The leading advocates claim that this refers to "our state of being in a world dominated by North American slave-owning gangs [sic], not that we are really barbarians. Ruguan refers to the path of breaking the slave-owning gangs' system of domination."

== List of metaphors ==
As well as the Qing and Ming dynasties, Chinese netizens have used many other metaphors and references to enrich the discourse, such as comparing the Strait of Malacca to the Shanhai Pass, total westernization to shaving and changing clothes, and breaking through the Shanhai Pass to breaking through the Straits of Malacca and the American blockade associated with it.

The rhetoric also compares Hong Kong and Macau with Haixi Jurchens, Taiwan with Pi Island, Siberia with Khorchin Mongols, Japan and South Korea with Joseon, Malacca Strait with Shanhaiguan, Indian Ocean with Central Plains, and India with Dzungar Khanate.

17th century metaphors	Modern-day entities represented	Notes	Ref.
Ming dynasty	United States of America	The hegemonic empire in decline	
Jianzhou Jurchens	People's Republic of China	The upstart	
Haixi Jurchens	Hong Kong and Macau	Ruguanxue discourse believes that domestic public opinion needs to be unified before it can challenge the international order dominated by the United States.	
Shanhai Pass	Malacca Strait	Key node(s) in China's trade	
Pi Island	Taiwan	Ruguanxue discourse believes that the symbolic significance of reunification (incorporating the island into the new hegemon state) is greater than its practical significance	
Khorchin Mongols	Russia	Ruguanxue discourse believe China and Russia should jointly oppose the United States with China as the main force	
Dzungar Khanate	India	Ruguanxue discourse believes that India is a territory to be conquered akin to how the Qing conquered Dzungaria	
Tributary system	The current international order led by the United States		
Entering the pass (入关; ruguan)	Establishing a new world order to replace the American hegemony		

== See also ==
- China's peaceful rise
- Mandate of Heaven
- Thucydides Trap
- Translatio imperii

== Sources ==
- Buckley, Chris (14 December 2020). "China's Combative Nationalists See a World Turning Their Way". The New York Times.
- Fu, Zheng (2020). "国家与个体的双重边缘处境——"入关学"的不满情绪及其困境" [The Double Marginal Situation of the State and the Individual: The Discontent and Dilemma of "Ruguanxue"] (PDF). Dongfang Journal (in Simplified Chinese): 39–46.
- Kong, Yuan (2020). ""入关"与"伐纣"：关于中国崛起的两种知识论图景" ["Breakthrough the pass" and "Overthrow of Zhou": Two Intellectual Pictures of China's Rise] (PDF). Dongfang Journal (in Simplified Chinese): 25–31.
- Ma, Yifan (2020). ""入关学"的话语生成结构及其出路" [The Discursive Structure of "Ruguanxue" and its Way Out] (PDF). Dongfang Journal (in Simplified Chinese) (9): 53-63.
- Wong, Brian Y. S. (6 April 2021). "China Has an Image Problem—but Knows How to Fix It". Foreign Policy.
- Yang, Yuan (20 April 2021). "China's keyboard warriors like to fight . . . each other". Financial Times.
- Yang, Bowen (2020). "对"入关学"的宪法社会学思考：国际体系与国内宪制塑造" [Constitutional Sociological Reflections on "Ruguanxue": International System and Domestic Constitutional Shaping] (PDF). Dongfang Journal (in Simplified Chinese) (9): 64-71.
- Yao, Yunfan (2020). "从"网络政见"到"网络键政"——修辞学视野中的"入关学"" [From "Internet Political Opinions" to "Internet Keyboard Politics" – The Rhetorical Perspective of "Ruguanxue"] (PDF). Dongfang Journal (in Simplified Chinese) (9): 32-38.
- Zhang, Yiwu (2020). ""入关学"的思考" [Reflections on "Ruguanxue"]. Zhongguancun (in Simplified Chinese) (12): 112–113.
