= Foucault (Merquior book) =

1985 book by José Guilherme Merquior

- Cover of the first edition
- Author: José Guilherme Merquior
- Language: English
- Series: Fontana Modern Masters
- Subject: Michel Foucault
- Publisher: Fontana Press
- Publication date: 1985
- Publication place: United Kingdom
- Media type: Print (Hardcover and Paperback)
- Pages: 188 (1991 edition)
- ISBN: 978-0006862260

Foucault is a book by José Guilherme Merquior about the French philosopher Michel Foucault, first published in 1985.

== Overview ==
Merquior's assessment of Foucault's work is largely negative; he argues that Foucault's work is marked by factual errors and questionable arguments. Merquior acknowledges that Foucault "forced us to think anew on sundry past forms of knowledge" in relation to themes of madness, punishment and sexuality, but characterises him as a "doctrinaire historian who more often than not strives to compress the historical record in the Procust's [sic] bed of ideological preinterpretations." Concluding, Merquior characterises Foucault as "a neo-anarchist".

== Reception ==
In his foreword to Gilles Deleuze's Foucault, Paul Bové described Merquior's book as "a particularly sad example of uncritical arrogance that embarasses everyone involved". John M. Ellis, however, identified the book as "the best general account of Foucault", while Alan Swingewood, reviewing the book in The British Journal of Sociology, described it as "an elegant and well-informed of Foucault's 'highly original' fusion of history and philosophy". Camille Paglia wrote that Merquior's study "hilariously exposes the elementary errors made by Foucault in every area he wrote about".
