= Harry Levin =

American literary critic and scholar

- Born: July 18, 1912; Minneapolis, Minnesota, U.S.
- Died: May 29, 1994 (aged 81); Cambridge, Massachusetts, U.S.

Academic background
- Education: Harvard University

Academic work
- Discipline: Literary criticism
- Doctoral students: Paul de Man
- Main interests: Modernism and comparative literature

Harry Tuchman Levin (July 18, 1912 – May 29, 1994) was an American literary critic and scholar of both modernism and comparative literature.

== Life and career ==
Levin was born in Minneapolis, the son of Beatrice Hirshler (née Tuchman) and Isadore Henry Levin. His family was Jewish. Levin was educated at Harvard University (where he was a contemporary of M. H. Abrams). According to a biographical memoir by Walter Jackson Bate:

After graduating summa cum laude in 1933, he was appointed Junior Fellow in then-new Harvard University Society of Fellows, the university's highest honour bestowed upon graduate students, where he pursued in depth what were to become his three major interests: Shakespeare and the English Renaissance; modern literature generally; and the relation of English and American to other literatures, from Greek and Latin antiquity to the present, all of which are reflected in his early publications, giving him a perspective lacking in the ordinary specialist and scarcely matched in his later years by more than three or four scholars here or abroad. In the 1930s, junior fellows did not normally take a Ph. D., so that Harry, like his noted predecessor, George Lyman Kittredge, remained an A.B., though he was in time to receive six honorary degrees, including ones from Oxford and the Sorbonne, and though he was, over the years, to supervise over ninety doctoral theses.

Levin began teaching at Harvard in 1939 and that same year he married Elena Zarudnaya. He was named Irving Babbitt Professor of Comparative Literature at Harvard in 1960 and retired in 1983. He continued to live near campus in Cambridge, Massachusetts, until his death in 1994. He was survived by his widow Elena and their daughter Marina.

Levin was an elected member of both the American Academy of Arts and Sciences and the American Philosophical Society.

Levin's course in "Comedy on the Stage" inspired Leonard Lehrman to write the paper, "The Threepenny Cradle," comparing the Brecht-Weill Threepenny Opera to Marc Blitzstein's The Cradle Will Rock. In the fall of 1969, in a production of Cradle directed by Lehrman, Levin was the sole patron. In 1970-1971 he encouraged, advised, and became a patron for two other Harvard productions by Lehrman: the U.S. premiere of Brecht's The Days of the Commune, and a triple-bill in memory of Blitzstein, which was attended by Leonard Bernstein. It was at that production that Levin invited Bernstein to become Norton Lecturer at Harvard, which he did, a year later.

In 1985, the American Comparative Literature Association began awarding the Harry Levin Prize for books on literary history or criticism and in 1997, Harvard University endowed the new chair (position) of Harry Levin Professor of Literature.

== Works ==
- — (1931). The Broken Column: A Study in Romantic Hellenism. Cambridge: Harvard University Press. LCCN 31033881. – undergraduate essay
- Jonson, Ben (1938). — (ed.). Selected Works. New York: Random House. LCCN 38027824.
- — (1941). James Joyce: A Critical Introduction (1st ed.). Norfolk: New Directions Books. LCCN 42006211.
- — (1960) [1941]. James Joyce: A Critical Introduction (Revised and Augmented ed.). Norfolk: New Directions Books. LCCN 60009222.
- — (1945). Toward Stendhal; an essay. with George Mayberry. Murray: Pharos. LCCN 46005836.
- — (1949). Introduction. The Portable James Joyce. By Joyce, James. New York: Viking Press. LCCN 47001424.
- — (1947). Toward Balzac. New York: New Directions Books. LCCN 48003434.
- Bate, Walter Jackson; et al. (1950). — (ed.). Perspectives of Criticism. Harvard Studies in Comparative Literature. Vol. 20. Cambridge: Harvard University Press. LCCN 50007472.
- — (1947). The Overreacher: A Study of Christopher Marlowe. Cambridge: Harvard University Press. LCCN 52009392.
- — (1956). Symbolism and Fiction. Charlottesville: University of Virginia Press.
- — (1957). Contexts of Criticism. Cambridge: Harvard University Press. LCCN 57007613.
- — (1958). The Power of Blackness: Hawthorne, Poe, Melville. New York: Knopf. LCCN 58005826.
- — (1959). The Question of Hamlet. New York: Oxford University Press. LCCN 59005784.
- — (1960). Irving Babbitt and the Teaching of Literature. Cambridge: Harvard University Press. OCLC 12331913. – lecture to mark the inauguration of the Irving Babbitt Professorship of Comparative Literature
- Hawthorne, Nathaniel (1960). — (ed.). The Scarlet Letter and Other Tales of the Puritans. Boston: Houghton Mifflin. LCCN 60002662.
- — (1963). The Gates of Horn: A Study of Five French Realists. New York: Oxford University Press. LCCN 63012552.
- Shakespeare, William (1965). — (ed.). The Comedy of Errors. New York: New American Library. ISBN 978-0-451-52100-2.
- — (1966). Refractions: Essays in Comparative Literature. New York: Oxford University Press. LCCN 66014477.
- — (1969). The Myth of the Golden Age in the Renaissance. New York: Indiana University Press. ISBN 978-0-253-14490-4.
- — (1987). Playboys and Killjoys: An Essay on the Theory and Practice of Comedy. New York: Oxford University Press. ISBN 978-0-19-504856-8.
