= Manuel Luque =

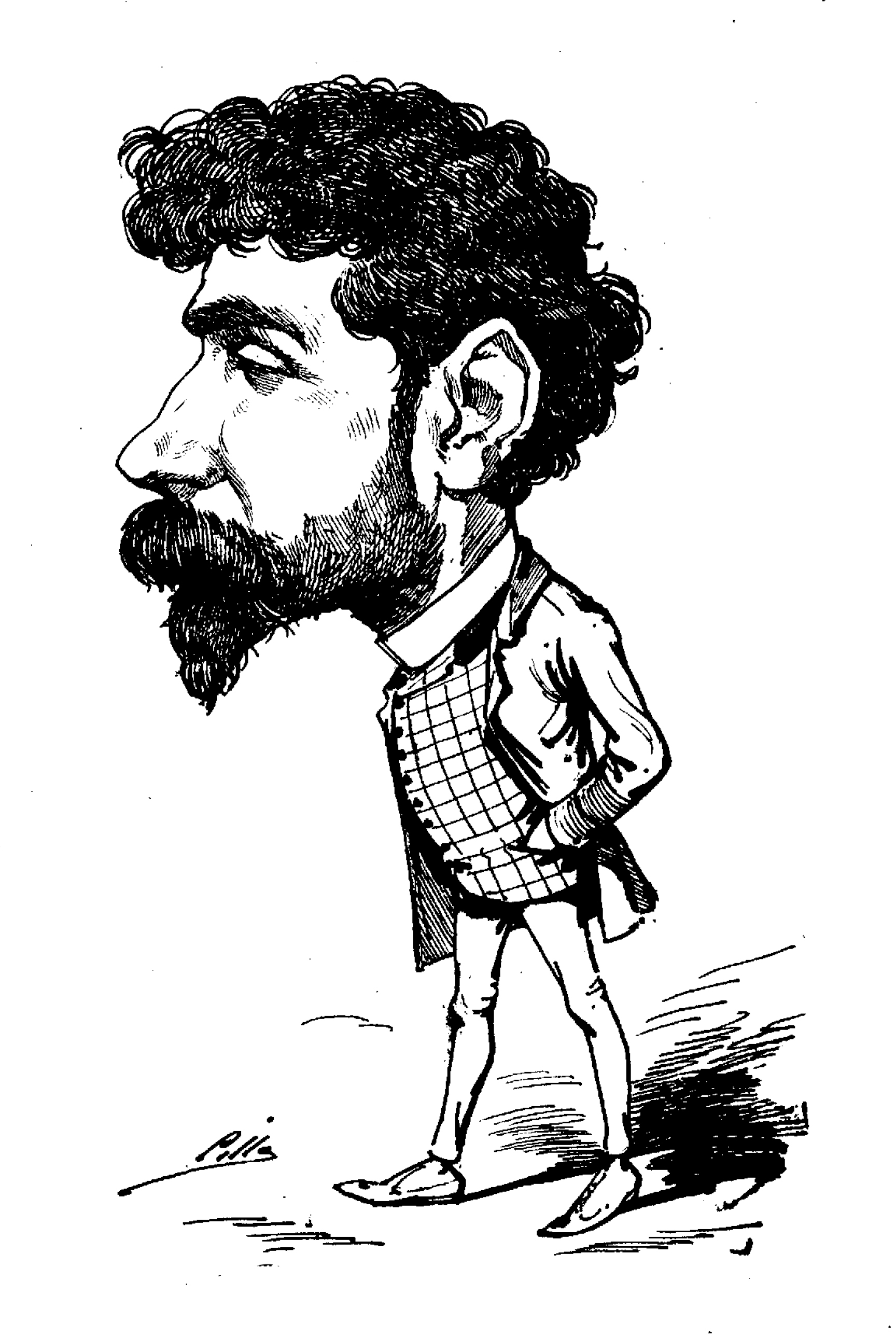
Manuel Luque, by Ramón Cilla, from Madrid Cómico, 1884

Manuel Antonin Ildefonse Cypriano Luque de Soria (1853/54, Almería - 8 November 1924, Autun) was a Spanish-born caricaturist, lithographer, designer and painter, who spent most of his career in Paris.

== Biography ==
He was born to a family of modest means. At the age of sixteen, he went to Madrid where, in 1873, he found employment as a cartoonist, with El Mundo Cómico, a short-lived satirical journal. His future style was heavily influenced by the journal's Director, José Luis Pellicer, who was a patron to numerous young artists. While there, he made contributions to other similar publications.

In 1875, he was in Paris; living in the Latin Quarter. He contacted Pierre Véron, the Editor-in-Chief of Le Charivari and Journal Amusant, who helped establish his reputation as a caricaturist in France. Although he returned to Madrid in 1876, he continued to send drawings to Véron. From 1879 to 1880, together with Daniel Perea, he decorated the salons at the Café de Fornos and the Café de la Iberia.

He returned to Paris in 1881, and would remain in France for the rest of his life. Between 1885 and 1890, he was the primary contributor of cover illustrations for the series, Les Hommes d'aujourd'hui, edited by André Gill and Félicien Champsaur. He created 68 altogether, the best known of which depicts Arthur Rimbaud (1888). On the basis of that, he was commissioned to provide a series of engraved portraits for Les Poètes maudits, by Paul Verlaine. He then illustrated Les Courses de taureaux, by Armand Dayot.

In 1892, he began a second career as a painter; exhibiting his works in Madrid for many years. At the same time, he once again provided caricatures for a Spanish publication, Blanco y Negro.

He married the widow, Yvonne de Courneau de Bosquet, from La Garenne-Colombes, in 1908. Shortly after, they moved to Autun, where he died in 1924. Some of his original works may be seen there, at the Musée Rolin.

== Selected covers from Les Hommes d'aujourd'hui ==
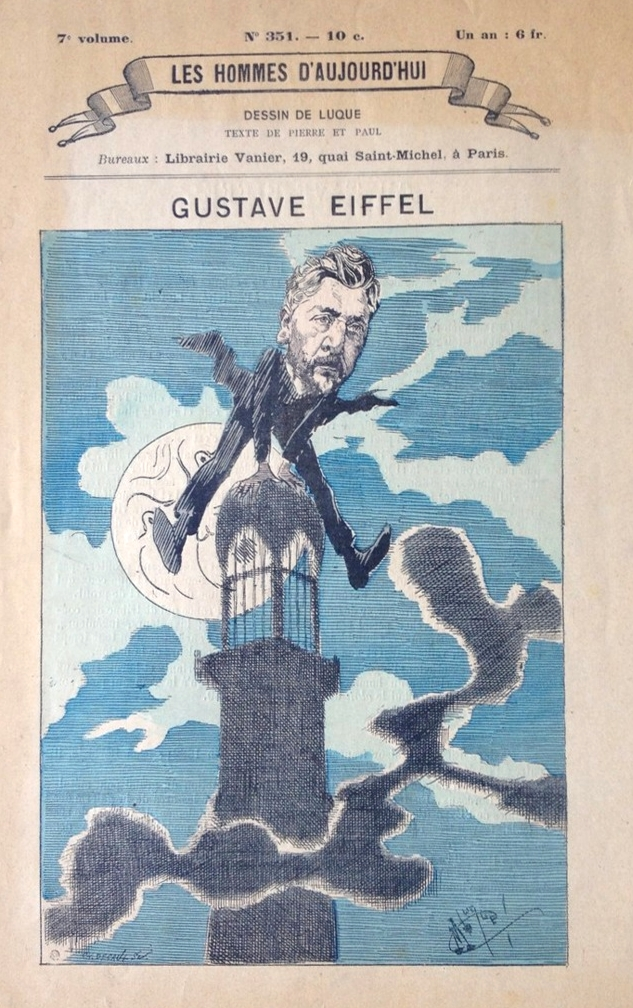
The engineer, Gustave Eiffel

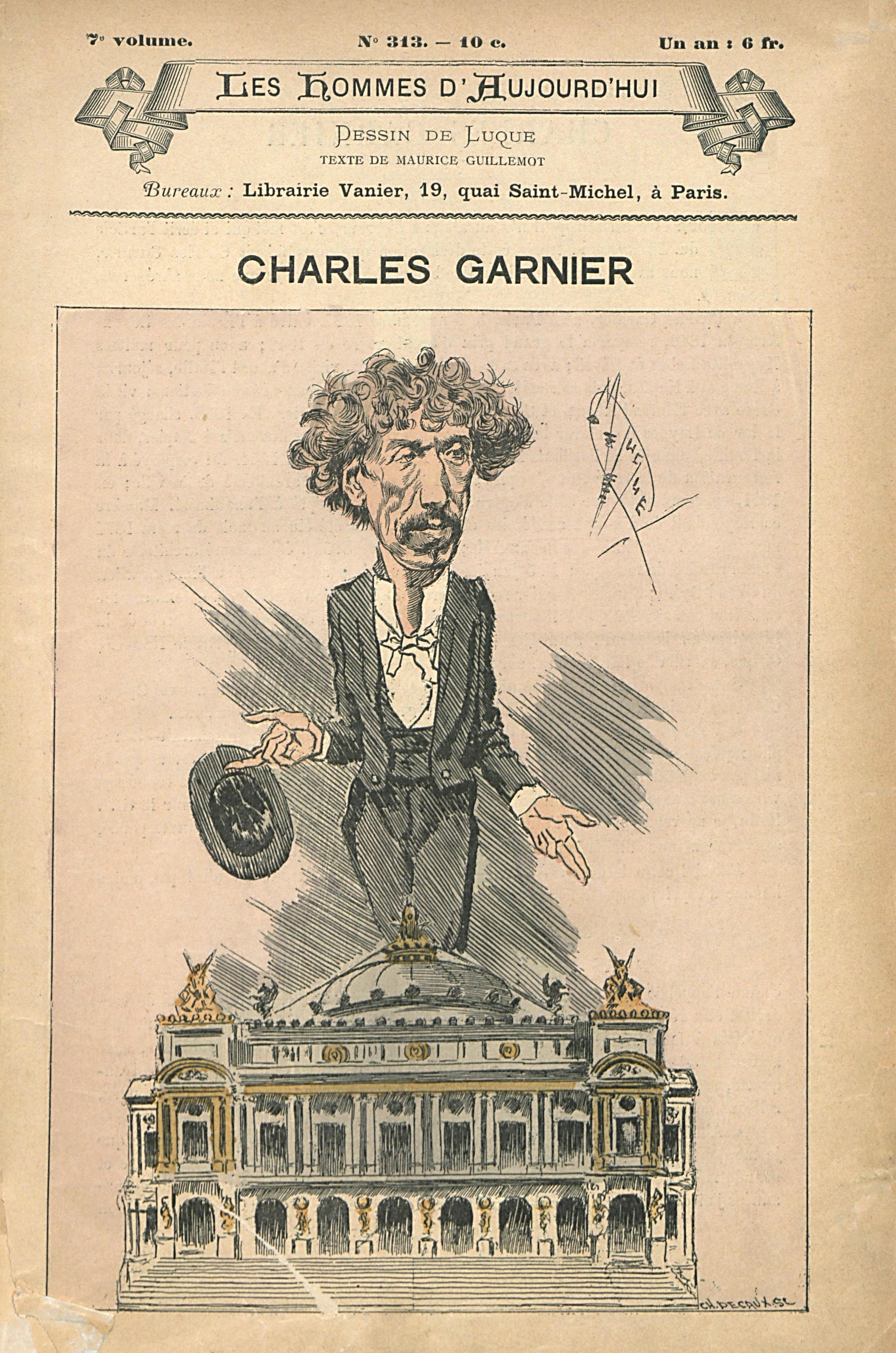
The architect,
Charles Garnier

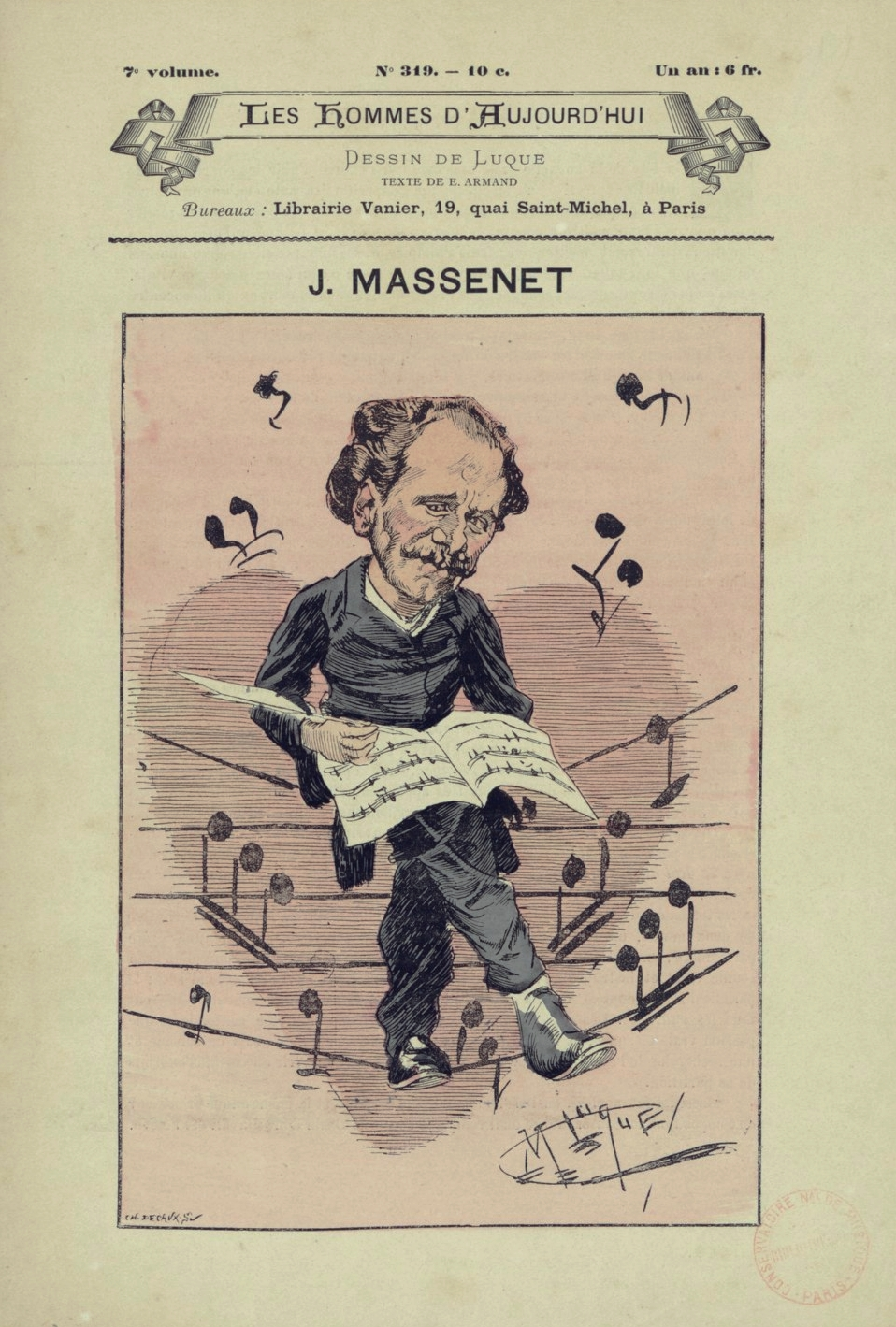
The composer,
Jules Massenet

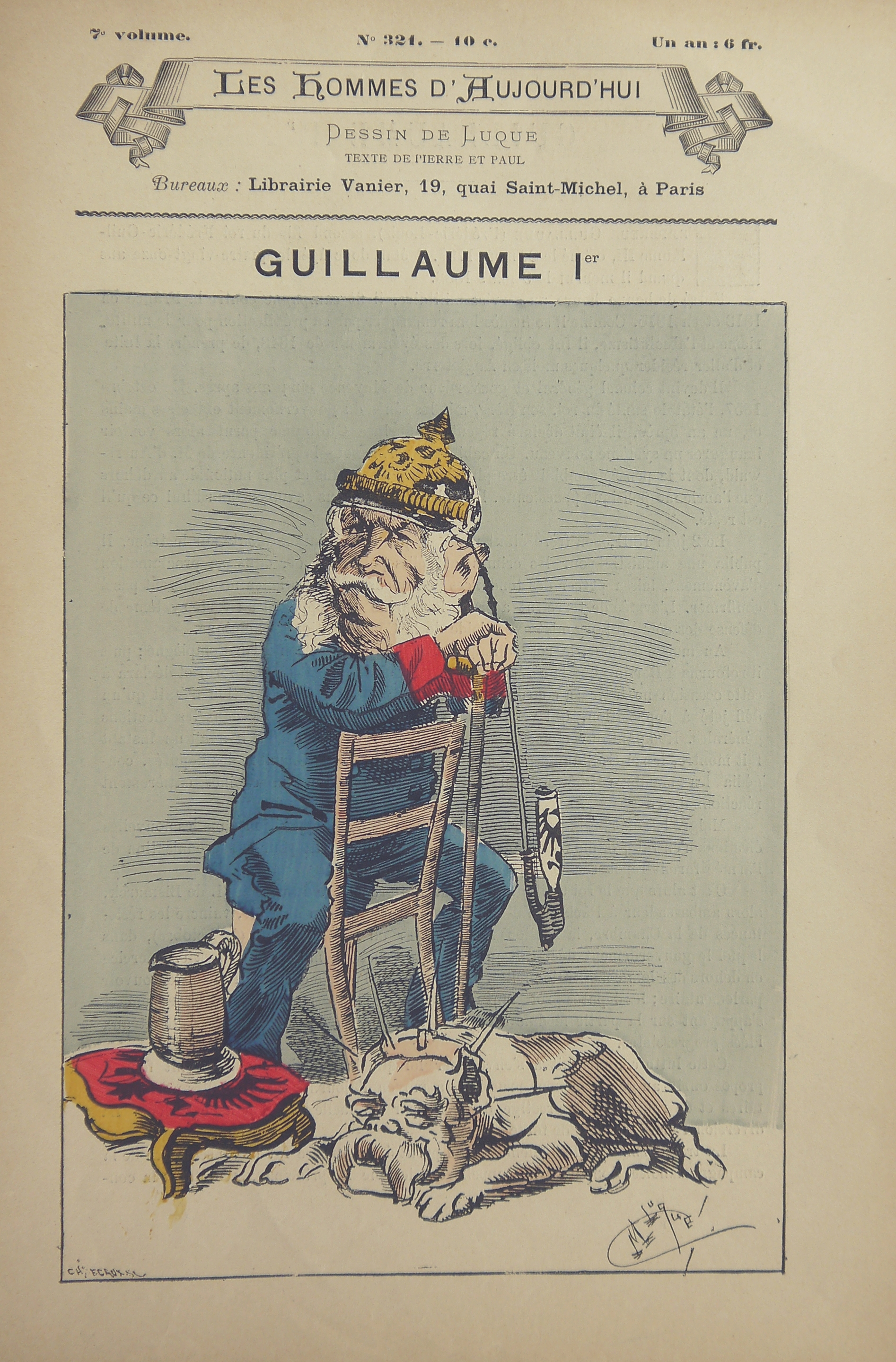
Kaiser Wilhelm I

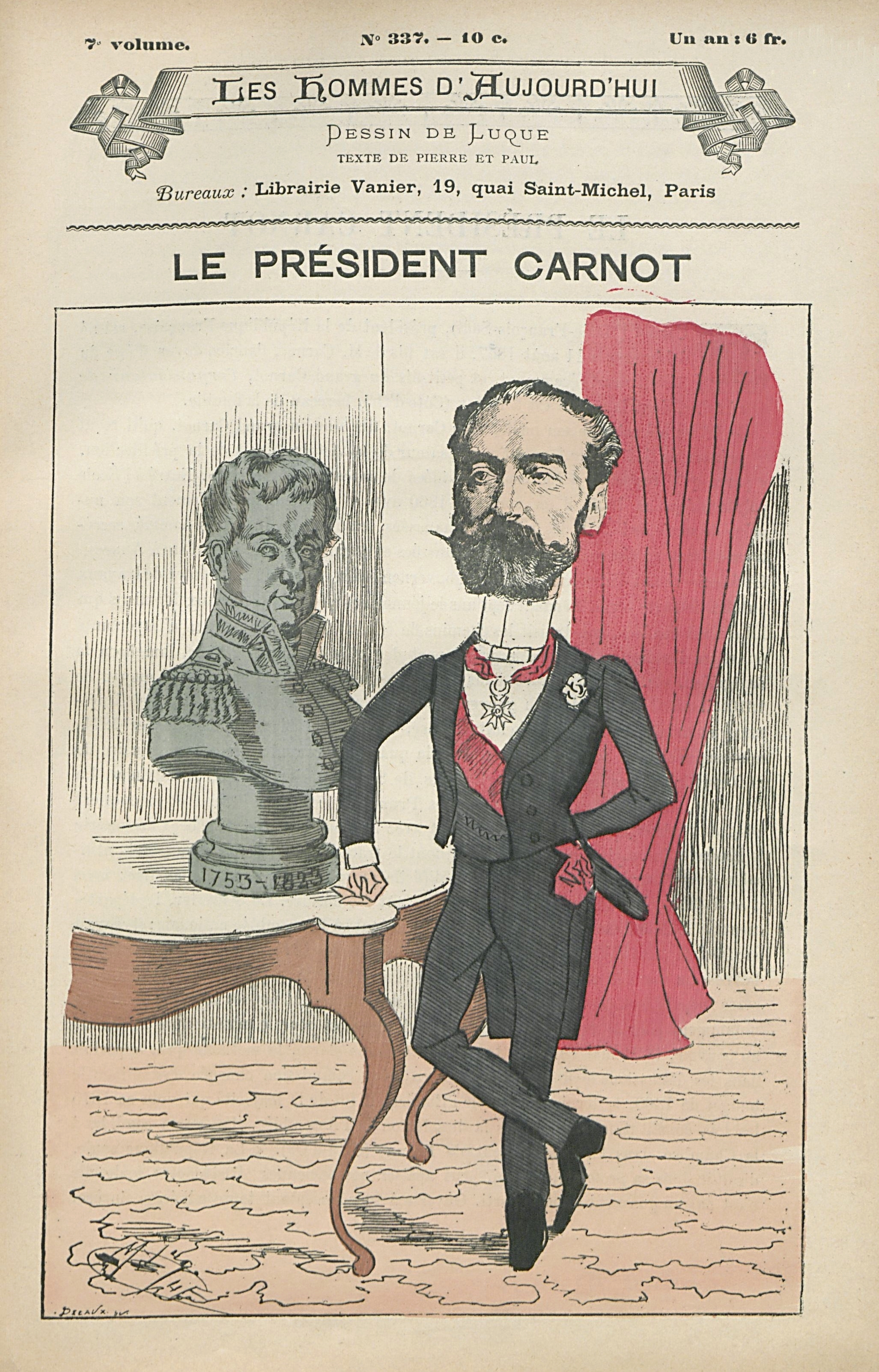
President
Sadi Carnot

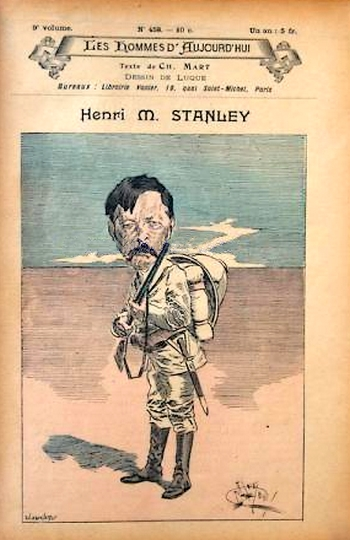
English explorer,
Henry M. Stanley

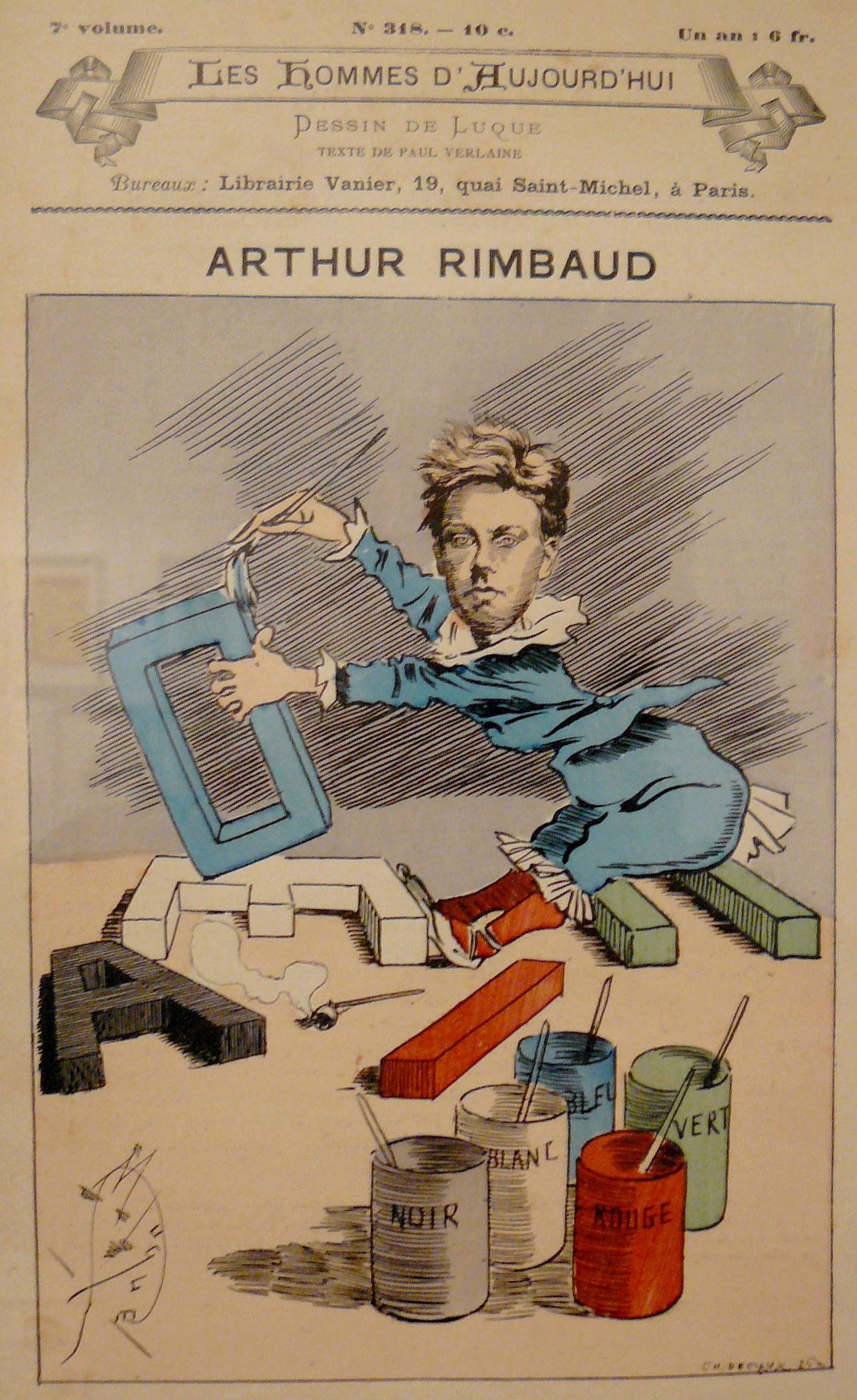
The poet,
Arthur Rimbaud

== Sources ==
- Detailed biography of Luque @ the Lázaro Galdiano Museum.
- Manuel Ossorio y Bernard, "Luque (D. Manuel)", In: Galería biográfica de artistas españoles del siglo XIX, 1884, Imprenta de Moreno y Rojas, reprinted by Nabu Press, 2012, ISBN 978-1-274-69165-1
