= Samuel Weber =

American philosopher (born 1940)

- Born: 1940 (age 85–86)

Academic background
- Education: Cornell University
- Influences: Paul de Man

Academic work
- Main interests: Translator

Samuel M. Weber (born 1940, in New York City) is the Avalon Foundation Professor of Humanities at Northwestern University, as well as a professor at the European Graduate School in Saas-Fee, Switzerland.

Weber began PhD studies at Yale University. Partly through correspondence with Herbert Marcuse he became interested in emerging German and French theoretical debates. He later transferred to Cornell University where he wrote a dissertation under the tutelage of Paul de Man. Weber co-translated the first English-language collection of essays by German philosopher Theodor Adorno. Since that time he has held professorships in Germany, France and the United States.

In the late 1970s and 1980s he played a leading role in introducing and interpreting the work of the French philosopher Jacques Derrida and the French psychoanalyst Jacques Lacan, both in the United States and Germany. As a writer and editor with German colleagues such as Friedrich Kittler, on projects such as the journal Diskursanalysen, Weber shaped early themes in what would become known as "German media theory." Weber is recognized as a noted philosopher, theorist and critic in his own right, whose work is characterized by fine-grained, deconstructive readings of literary and philosophical texts. He is also the director of Northwestern University's Paris Program in Critical Theory.
