= Paul de Man =

American literary theorist (1919–1983)

- Born: Paul Adolph Michel Deman; December 6, 1919; Antwerp, Belgium
- Died: December 21, 1983 (aged 64); New Haven, Connecticut, U.S.

Education
- Education: Free University of Brussels; Harvard University (Ph.D., 1960)
- Doctoral advisor: Harry Levin

Philosophical work
- Era: Contemporary philosophy
- Region: Western philosophy
- School: Continental philosophy Deconstruction
- Institutions: Cornell University
- Doctoral students: Gayatri Chakravorty Spivak
- Main interests: Literary theory, rhetoric, Romanticism
- Notable ideas: Criticism of authorial intentionalism

Paul de Man (/dəˈmɑːn/; Dutch: [də mɑn]; December 6, 1919 – December 21, 1983), born Paul Adolph Michel Deman, was a Belgian-born American literary critic and literary theorist. He was known particularly for his importation of German and French philosophical approaches into Anglo-American literary studies and critical theory. Along with Jacques Derrida, he was part of an influential critical movement that went beyond traditional interpretation of literary texts to reflect on the epistemological difficulties inherent in any textual, literary, or critical activity. This approach aroused considerable opposition, which de Man attributed to "resistance" inherent in the difficult enterprise of literary interpretation itself.

After his death, de Man became a subject of further controversy when his history of writing pro-Nazi and anti-Jewish propaganda for the wartime edition of Le Soir, a major Belgian newspaper during German occupation, came to light.

== Early life and education ==
Paul de Man was born to a family of artisans of nineteenth-century Belgium and by the time of his birth, his family was prominent among the new bourgeoisie in Antwerp. He was the son of Robert de Man, a manufacturer and Magdalena de Braey. His maternal great-grandfather was the noted Flemish poet Jan Van Beers, and the family spoke French at home. His uncle Henri de Man (Dutch: Hendrik) was a famous socialist theorist and politician, who became a Nazi-collaborator during World War II. He played an important part in the decisions made by De Man during the Nazi occupation of Belgium. Paul's father, Robert ("Bob") de Man, was a moderately successful businessman whose firm manufactured X-ray equipment. De Man's father and his mother, Madeleine, who were first cousins, married over the family's opposition. The marriage proved unhappy.

De Man's early life was difficult and shadowed by tragedy. His mother Madeleine's first pregnancy with her oldest son Hendrik ("Rik," b. 1915) coincided with the intense German bombings of World War I and strained her physical and mental health. The stillbirth of a daughter two years later pushed her into intermittent but lifelong suicidal depression. She was psychologically fragile and had to be watched. The family walked on eggshells and "Bob" de Man found solace with other women. In contrast to Rik, who was backward and a failure in school, Paul dealt with his difficult home life by becoming a brilliant student and accomplished athlete. He was enrolled in the Dutch-speaking cohort of boys admitted to the prestigious and highly competitive Royal Athenaeum of Antwerp. There, he followed his father's career path in choosing to study science and engineering, consistently receiving top marks in all subjects and graduating at the top of his class. He took no courses in literature or philosophy but developed a strong extracurricular interest in both as well as in religious mysticism. In 1936, his brother Rik de Man was killed at the age of 21 when his bicycle was struck by a train at a railroad crossing. The following year, it was Paul, then seventeen, who discovered the body of their mother, who had hanged herself a month before the anniversary of Rik's death.

That fall Paul enrolled in the Free University of Brussels. He wrote for student magazines and continued to take courses in science and engineering. For stability he turned to his uncle Henri as a patron and surrogate emotional father, later on several occasions telling people Henri was his real father and his real father was his uncle. He fathered a son with Romanian-born Anaïde Baraghian, the wife of his good friend, Gilbert Jaeger. They lived in a ménage à trois until August 1942, when Baraghian left her husband. Paul married her in 1944, and the couple had two more sons together.

De Man, Baraghian and Jaeger fled to the south of France near the Spanish border when the Nazis occupied Belgium in 1940. Henri, who by then was a self-avowed fascist, welcomed the Nazi invaders, whom he saw as essential for instituting his brand of socialism. For a year, Henri de Man was appointed as de facto puppet Prime Minister of Belgium under the Nazis. Some believed that he used his influence to secure his nephew a position as an occasional cultural critic for Le Soir, the influential Belgian French-language newspaper. After contributing an essay, "The Jews in Present-Day Literature", to Le Soir volé's notorious antisemitic attack of March 4, 1941, de Man became its official book reviewer and a cultural critic. Later he contributed to the Flemish daily Het Vlaamsche Land; both publications were vehemently antisemitic when under Nazi control. As a cultural critic, de Man would contribute hundreds of articles and reviews to these publications. His writings supported the Germanic ideology and the triumph of Germany in the war, while never referring directly to Hitler himself.

Holding three different jobs, de Man became very highly paid, but he lost all three between November 1942 and April 1943, failures that resulted from a combination of losing a coup he had launched against one employer and his own incompetence as a businessman at another. After this, de Man went into hiding; the Belgian Resistance had now begun assassinating prominent Belgian pro-Nazis. He had lost his protection in late 1942, when Henri, mistrusted by his collaborators on the right and himself marked for death as a traitor by the Belgian Resistance, went into exile.

De Man spent the rest of the war in seclusion reading American and French literature and philosophy and organizing a translation into Dutch of Moby Dick by Herman Melville, which he published in 1945. He would be interrogated by prosecutor Roger Vinçotte, but not charged after the war. Henri de Man was tried and convicted in absentia for treason; he died in Switzerland in 1953, after crashing his car into an oncoming train, an accident that was almost certainly a suicide.

== Post-war years ==
In 1948, de Man left Belgium and emigrated to New York City. He had fled as an exile to avoid what became two trials for criminal and financial misdeeds (thefts of money from investors in a publishing company he ran) for which he was convicted in absentia to five years of imprisonment and heavy fines. Baraghian sailed with their three young sons to Argentina, where her parents had recently immigrated. De Man found work stocking books at the Doubleday Bookstore at New York City's Grand Central Station. From there he wrote to his friend Georges Bataille, a French philosopher, and through him, he met Dwight Macdonald, a key figure on the New York intellectual and literary scene. At Macdonald's apartment, de Man met the celebrated novelist Mary McCarthy. McCarthy recommended de Man to her friend Artine Artinian, a professor of French at Bard College, as a temporary replacement while Artinian spent the academic year 1949–50 in France as a Fulbright fellow.

De Man was to teach Mr. Artinian's courses, advise Mr. Artinian's advisees, and move into Mr. Artinian's house. By December [1949], de Man had married one of the advisees, a French major named Patricia Kelley, and when the first Mrs. de Man turned up with their three young boys, Hendrik, Robert, and Marc, in the spring of 1950, Patricia de Man [sic] was pregnant.

De Man persuaded the devastated Baraghian to accept a sum of money, agree to a divorce, and return to Argentina. She, however, surprised him when she left the eldest boy with him, while he surprised her when his first check proved worthless. The boy was raised by Kelley's parents while she took the younger ones back to Argentina with a promise of child support that de Man was never to honor.

A heavily fictionalized account of this period of de Man's life is the basis of Henri Thomas's 1964 novel Le Parjure (The Perjurer). His life also provides the basis for Bernhard Schlink's 2006 novel, translated as "Homecoming". De Man married Kelley a first time in June 1950, but did not tell her that he had not actually gotten a divorce and that the marriage was bigamous. They underwent a second marriage ceremony in August 1960, when his divorce from Baraghian was finalized, and later had a third ceremony in Ithaca. In addition to their son, Michael, born while the couple was at Bard College, they had a daughter, Patsy. The couple remained together until de Man's death, aged 64, in New Haven, Connecticut.

== Academic career ==
The de Mans moved to Boston, where Paul earned money teaching conversational French at Berlitz and did translations assisted by Patricia de Man; he also gave private French lessons to Harvard student Henry Kissinger, then running a small center and publication of his own. There, de Man met Harry Levin, the Harvard Professor of Comparative Literature, and "was invited to join an informal literary seminar that met at Levin's house (alongside, e.g., George Steiner and John Simon). By the fall of 1952, he was officially admitted to graduate study in comparative literature." In 1954 someone sent Harvard an anonymous letter denouncing de Man as a wartime collaborator and questioning his immigration status (a letter not surviving, and known only on the basis of de Man's response to it). According to Harvard faculty members, de Man offered a thorough and more than satisfactory account of his immigration status and the nature of his political activities. While he was writing his dissertation, de Man was awarded a prestigious appointment at the Harvard Society of Fellows. In 1960, because his thesis was unsatisfactory to his mentors on several counts, and especially its philosophical approach, they were prepared to dismiss him, but he moved immediately to an advanced position at Cornell University, where he was highly valued.

He began his teaching career in the United States at Bard College where he taught French literature. He completed his Ph.D. at Harvard University in 1960, then taught at Cornell University, Johns Hopkins University, and the University of Zurich. He joined the faculty in French and Comparative Literature at Yale University, where he was considered part of the Yale School of Deconstruction. At the time of his death from cancer, he was Sterling Professor of the Humanities and chairman of the Department of Comparative Literature at Yale. De Man oversaw the dissertations of Gayatri Spivak (at Cornell), Barbara Johnson (at Yale), Samuel Weber (at Cornell), and many other noted scholars.

Peter Brooks, who was de Man's undergraduate student at Harvard, and later became his friend and colleague at Yale, wrote that rather than brand de Man as a confidence man, as his critics were inclined to do:

One might consider this a story of remarkable survival and success following the chaos of war, occupation, postwar migration, and moments of financial desperation: without any degrees to his name, de Man had impressed, among others, Georges Bataille, Macdonald, McCarthy, and Levin, and entered the highest precincts of American academia. During the following decade, he contributed nine articles to the newly established New York Review: astute and incisive short essays on major European writers—Hölderlin, Gide, Camus, Sartre, Heidegger, as well as Borges—that display notable cultural range and critical poise.

In 1966, de Man attended a conference on structuralism held at Johns Hopkins University, where Jacques Derrida delivered his celebrated essay, "Structure, Sign, and Play in the Discourse of the Human Sciences"; de Man and Derrida soon became fast friends. Both were to become identified with Deconstruction. De Man came to reflect the influence primarily of Heidegger and used deconstruction to study Romanticism, both English and German, as well as French literature, specifically the works of William Wordsworth, John Keats, Maurice Blanchot, Marcel Proust, Jean-Jacques Rousseau, Friedrich Nietzsche, Immanuel Kant, G .W. F. Hegel, Walter Benjamin, William Butler Yeats, Friedrich Hoelderlin, and Rainer Maria Rilke.

Following an appointment to a professorship in Zürich, de Man returned to the United States in the 1970s to teach at Yale University, where he served for the rest of his career. At the time of his death of cancer at age 64, he was a Sterling Professor and chairman of the department of comparative literature at Yale.

After his death, a researcher uncovered some two hundred previously unknown articles which de Man had written in his early twenties for Belgian collaborationist newspapers during World War II, some of them implicitly and two explicitly antisemitic. These, in combination with revelations about his domestic life and financial history, caused a scandal and provoked a reconsideration of his life and work.

== Contributions to literary theory ==
Although de Man's work in the 1960s differs from his later deconstructive endeavors, considerable continuity can also be discerned. In his 1967 essay "Criticism and Crisis" (included as the first chapter of Blindness and Insight), he argues that because literary works are understood to be fictions rather than factual accounts, they exemplify the break between a sign and its meaning: literature "means" nothing, but critics resist this insight:

When modern critics think they are demystifying literature, they are in fact being demystified by it. But since this necessarily occurs in the form of a crisis, they are blind to what takes place within themselves. What they call anthropology, linguistics, psychoanalysis, is nothing but literature reappearing like the hydra's head in the very spot where it had been suppressed. The human mind will go through amazing feats to avoid facing 'the nothingness of human matters'.

De Man would later observe that, due to this resistance to acknowledging that literature does not "mean", English departments had become "large organizations in the service of everything except their own subject matter" ("The Return to Philology"). He said that the study of literature had become the art of applying psychology, politics, history, philology, or other disciplines to the literary text, in an effort to make the text "mean" something.

Among the central threads running through de Man's work is his attempt to tease out the tension between rhetoric (which de Man uses as a term to mean figural language and trope) and meaning, seeking moments in the text where linguistic forces "tie themselves into a knot which arrests the process of understanding." De Man's earlier essays from the 1960s, collected in Blindness and Insight, represent an attempt to seek these paradoxes in the texts of New Criticism and move beyond formalism. One of De Man's central topoi is of the blindness on which these critical readings are predicated, that the "insight seems instead to have been gained from a negative movement that animates the critic's thought, an unstated principle that leads his language away from its asserted stand...as if the very possibility of assertion had been put into question." Here de Man tries to undercut the notion of the poetic work as a unified, atemporal icon, a self-possessed repository of meaning freed from the intentionalist and affective fallacies. In de Man's argument, formalist and New Critical valorization of the "organic" nature of poetry is ultimately self-defeating: the notion of the verbal icon is undermined by the irony and ambiguity inherent within it. Form ultimately acts as "both a creator and undoer of organic totalities", and "the final insight...annihilated the premises which led up to it."

In Allegories of Reading, de Man further explores the tensions arising in figural language in Nietzsche, Rousseau, Rilke, and Proust. In these essays, he concentrates on crucial passages which have a metalinguistic function or metacritical implications, particularly those where figural language has a dependency on classical philosophical oppositions (essence/accident, synchronic/diachronic, appearance/reality) which are so central to Western discourse. Many of the essays in this volume attempt to undercut figural totalization, the notion that one can control or dominate a discourse or phenomenon through metaphor. In de Man's discussion of Nietzsche's The Birth of Tragedy, for instance, he claims that "genetic" conceptions of history appearing in the text are undercut by the rhetorical strategies Nietzsche employs: "the deconstruction does not occur between statements, as in a logical refutation or a dialectic, but happens instead between, on the one hand, metalinguistic statements about the rhetorical nature of language and, on the other hand, a rhetorical praxis that puts these statements into question." For de Man, an "allegory of reading" emerges when texts are subjected to such scrutiny and reveal this tension; a reading wherein the text reveals its own assumptions about language, and in so doing dictates a statement about undecidability, the difficulties inherent in totalization, their own readability, or the "limitations of textual authority."

De Man is also known for his readings of English and German Romantic and post-Romantic poetry and philosophy (The Rhetoric of Romanticism), and concise and deeply ironic essays. Specifically noteworthy is his critical dismantling of the Romantic ideology and the linguistic assumptions which underlie it. His arguments are outlined below. First, de Man seeks to deconstruct the privileged claims in Romanticism of symbol over allegory, and metaphor over metonymy. In his reading, because of the implication of self-identity and wholeness which is inherent in the Romantics' conception of metaphor, when this self-identity decomposes, so also does the means of overcoming the dualism between subject and object, which Romantic metaphor sought to transcend. In de Man's reading, to compensate for this inability, Romanticism constantly relies on allegory to attain the wholeness established by the totality of the symbol.

In addition, in his essay "The Resistance to Theory", which explores the task and philosophical bases of literary theory, de Man uses the example of the classical trivium of grammar, rhetoric, and logic to argue that the use of linguistic sciences in literary theory and criticism (i.e. a structuralist approach) was able to harmonize the logical and grammatical dimension of literature, but only at the expense of effacing the rhetorical elements of texts which presented the greatest interpretive demands. He posits that the resistance to theory is the resistance to reading, thus the resistance to theory is theory itself. Or the resistance to theory is what constitutes the possibility and existence of theory. Taking up the example of the title of Keats's poem The Fall of Hyperion, de Man draws out an irreducible interpretive undecidability which bears strong affinities to the same term in Derrida's work and some similarity to the notion of incommensurability as developed by Jean-François Lyotard in The Postmodern Condition and The Differend. De Man argues that the recurring motive of theoretical readings is to subsume these decisions under theoretical, futile generalizations, which are displaced in turn by harsh polemics about theory.

== Influence and legacy ==
De Man's influence on literary criticism was considerable, in part through his numerous and vocal disciples. Although much of his work brought to bear insights on literature drawn from German philosophers such as Kant and Heidegger, de Man also closely followed developments in contemporary French literature, criticism, and theory.

Much of de Man's work was collected or published posthumously, for instance in his book Resistance to Theory which he completed shortly before his death, and a collection of essays, edited by his former Yale colleague Andrzej Warminski, was published by the University of Minnesota Press in 1996 under the title Aesthetic Ideology.

== Wartime journalism and posthumous controversies ==
In August 1987, Ortwin de Graef, a Belgian graduate student at the University of Leuven, discovered some two hundred articles, including antisemitic pieces, which de Man had written during World War II for Le Soir, a Nazi-controlled newspaper. In 1988, a conference on Paul de Man took place at the University of Antwerp. "On the last day, Jean Stengers, a historian at the Free University of Brussels, addressed a topic pointedly titled: "Paul de Man, a Collaborator?" Then Georges Goriely, professor emeritus of sociology at the Free University of Brussels, rose to deliver what he called "A Personal Testimony":

M. Goriely began by extolling de Man, whom he had known intimately in his youth, as "a charming, humorous, modest, highly cultured" homme de lettres renowned in Belgian literary circles during their youth. Then the professor dropped his bombshell. De Man, he asserted, wasn't all that he appeared to be. He was "completely, almost pathologically, dishonest," a crook who had bankrupted his family. "Swindling, forging, lying were, at least at the time, second nature to him."

The European press was in an uproar: "There were stories in La Quinzaine Litteraire, the Frankfurter Allgemeine Zeitung, The (Manchester) Guardian. Newsweek juxtaposed a photograph of de Man with another of Nazis on the march. Le Soir described him as 'an academic Waldheim."

De Man's disciples tried to portray the attacks on de Man as a cover for his critics' dislike of deconstruction, alleging that the attacks were a ruse that used de Man's youthful errors as evidence of what they considered the decadence at the heart of the Continental thought behind de Man and his theories. The controversies quickly spread from the pages of scholarly journals to the broader media. The Chronicle of Higher Education and the front page of The New York Times exposed the sensational details of de Man's personal life, particularly the circumstances of his marriage and his difficult relationships with his children.

In the most controversial and explicitly antisemitic essay from this wartime journalism, titled "Jews in Contemporary Literature" (1941), de Man described how "[v]ulgar anti-semitism willingly takes pleasure in considering post-war cultural phenomenon (after the war of 14–18) as degenerate and decadent because they are [enjewished]." He notes that

Literature does not escape this lapidary judgement: it is sufficient to discover a few Jewish writers under Latinized pseudonyms for all contemporary production to be considered polluted and evil. This conception entails rather dangerous consequences ... it would be a rather unflattering appreciation of western writers to reduce them to being mere imitators of a Jewish culture which is foreign to them.

The article claimed that contemporary literature had not broken from tradition as a result of the First World War and that

the Jews cannot claim to have been its creators, nor even to have exercised a preponderant influence over its development. On any closer examination, this influence appears to have extraordinarily little importance since one might have expected that, given the specific characteristics of the Jewish Spirit, the later would have played a more brilliant role in this artistic production.

The article concluded that "our civilization...[b]y keeping, in spite of Semitic interference in all aspects of European life, an intact originality and character...has shown that its basic character is healthy." It concluded that "the creation of a Jewish colony isolated from Europe" as "a solution to the Jewish problem" would not entail any "deplorable consequences" for "the literary life of the west." This is the only known article in which de Man pronounced such views so openly, though two or three other articles also accept without demurral the disenfranchisement and ostracization of Jews, as some contributors to Responses have noted.

De Man's colleagues, students, and contemporaries tried to respond to his early writings and his subsequent silence about them in the volume Responses: On Paul de Man's Wartime Journalism (edited by Werner Hamacher, Neil Hertz, and Thomas Keenan; Nebraska, 1989). His longtime friend, Jacques Derrida, who was Jewish, published a long piece responding to de Man's critics, declaring:

To judge, to condemn the work or the man on the basis of what was a brief episode, to call for closing, that is to say, at least figuratively, for censuring or burning his books is to reproduce the exterminating gesture which one accuses de Man of not having armed himself against sooner with the necessary vigilance. It is not even to draw a lesson that he, de Man, learned to draw from the war.

Some readers objected to what they considered as Derrida's effort to relate criticism of de Man to the greater tragedy of extermination of the Jews.

Fredric Jameson lengthily defended de Man in Postmodernism, or, the Cultural Logic of Late Capitalism (1991), observing about de Man's critics that "it does not seem to me that North American intellectuals have generally had the kind of experience of history that would qualify them to judge the actions and choices of people under military occupation." According to Jameson, the efforts to implicate de Man in the Holocaust hinged on a fundamental misunderstanding of Nazi antisemitism:

The exclusive emphasis on anti-Semitism ignores and politically neutralizes its other constitutive feature in the Nazi period: namely, anticommunism. [The] very possibility of the Judeocide was absolutely at one with and inseparable from the anticommunist and radical right-wing mission of National Socialism.... But put this way, it seems at once clear that DeMan was neither an anticommunist nor a right-winger: had he taken such positions in his student days..., they would have been public knowledge.

Turning to the content and ideology of de Man's wartime journalism, Jameson contended that it was "devoid of any personal originality or distinctiveness", simply rehearsing corporatist commonplaces found in a broad range of European political movements. From this, Jameson concluded that none of the wartime articles "had any relevance to Paul De Man, for whom the thing dramatically called 'collaboration' was simply a job, in a Europe henceforth and for the foreseeable future united and German, and who as long as I knew him personally was simply a good liberal."

Since the late 1980s, some of de Man's followers, many of them Jewish, have pointed out that de Man at no time in his life displayed personal animus against Jews. Shoshana Felman, recounted that

about a year after the journalistic publication of his compromising statement, he and his wife sheltered for several days in their apartment the Jewish pianist Esther Sluszny and her husband, who were then illegal citizens in hiding from the Nazis. During this same period, de Man was meeting regularly with Georges Goriely, a member of the Belgian Resistance. According to Goriely's own testimony, he never for one minute feared denunciation of his underground activities by Paul de Man.

Jameson proposed that de Man's apparent antisemitism was suffused with irony and, properly interpreted, served as a philosemitic parody and rebuke of conventional antisemitic tropes. (Note: Jameson renders the basic message of de Man's wartime writings as follows: "you garden-variety anti-Semites ... in fact do your own cause a disservice. You have not understood that if 'Jewish literature' is as dangerous and virulent as you claim it is, it follows that Aryan literature does not amount to much ... You would therefore under these circumstances be better advised to stop talking about the Jews altogether and to cultivate your own garden.")

But, his disciples and defenders have failed to agree about the nature of de Man's silence about his wartime activities. His critics, on the other hand, point out that throughout his life de Man was not only passively silent, but also engaged in an active coverup through lies and misdirections about his past.

The question of de Man's personal history has continued to fascinate scholars, as evidenced by Evelyn Barish's 2014 biography The Double Life of Paul de Man. In an advance review published in Harper's Magazine, Christine Smallwood concludes that de Man, as portrayed by Barish, was "a slippery Mr. Ripley, a confidence man, and a hustler who embezzled, lied, forged, and arreared his way to intellectual acclaim." In response to these claims, Peter Brooks, who succeeded to de Man's post as Sterling Professor at Yale, stated that some of Barish's accusations were overblown, identifying several errors in her footnotes: "One could do a review of Barish's footnotes that would cast many doubts on her scholarship". For example, he cites the footnote Barish provides to support her claim that in 1942 de Man planned to launch a Nazi literary magazine: "I shared this information, and it has since been previously published in Belgian sources not now available to me", noting that this sort of thing "does not pass any sort of muster." Harvard professor Louis Menand, on the other hand, in his review in The New Yorker, finds Barish's biography important and credible, notwithstanding the presence of occasional errors and exaggerations. Menand writes "[h]er book is a brief for the prosecution. But it is not a hatchet job, and she has an amazing tale to tell. In her account, all guns are smoking. There are enough to stock a miniseries."

== Works ==
- Blindness and Insight: Essays in the Rhetoric of Contemporary Criticism. 1971.
- Allegories of Reading: Figural Language in Rousseau, Nietzsche, Rilke, and Proust (ISBN 0-300-02845-8), 1979.
- Blindness and Insight: Essays in the Rhetoric of Contemporary Criticism. 2nd ed. (ISBN 0-8166-1135-1), 1983.
- The Rhetoric of Romanticism (ISBN 0-231-05527-7), 1984.
- The Resistance to Theory (ISBN 0-8166-1294-3), 1986.
- Wartime Journalism, 1934–1943 Werner Hamacher, Neil Hertz, Thomas Keenan, editors (ISBN 0-8032-1684-X), 1988.
- Critical Writings: 1953–1978 Lindsay Waters, editor (ISBN 0-8166-1695-7), 1989.
- Romanticism and Contemporary Criticism: The Gauss Seminar and Other Papers E. S. Burt, Kevin Newmark, and Andrzej Warminski, editors (ISBN 0-8166-1695-7), 1993.
- Aesthetic Ideology Andrzej Warminski, editor (ISBN 0-8166-2204-3), 1996
- The Post-Romantic Predicament, Martin McQuillan, editor (ISBN 978-0-74864-105-5), 2012 [de Man's dissertation, collected with other writings from his Harvard University years, 1956–1961].
- The Paul de Man Notebooks, Martin McQuillan, editor (ISBN 978-0-74864-104-8), 2014.

== See also ==
- List of deconstructionists
