= Michel Foucault bibliography =

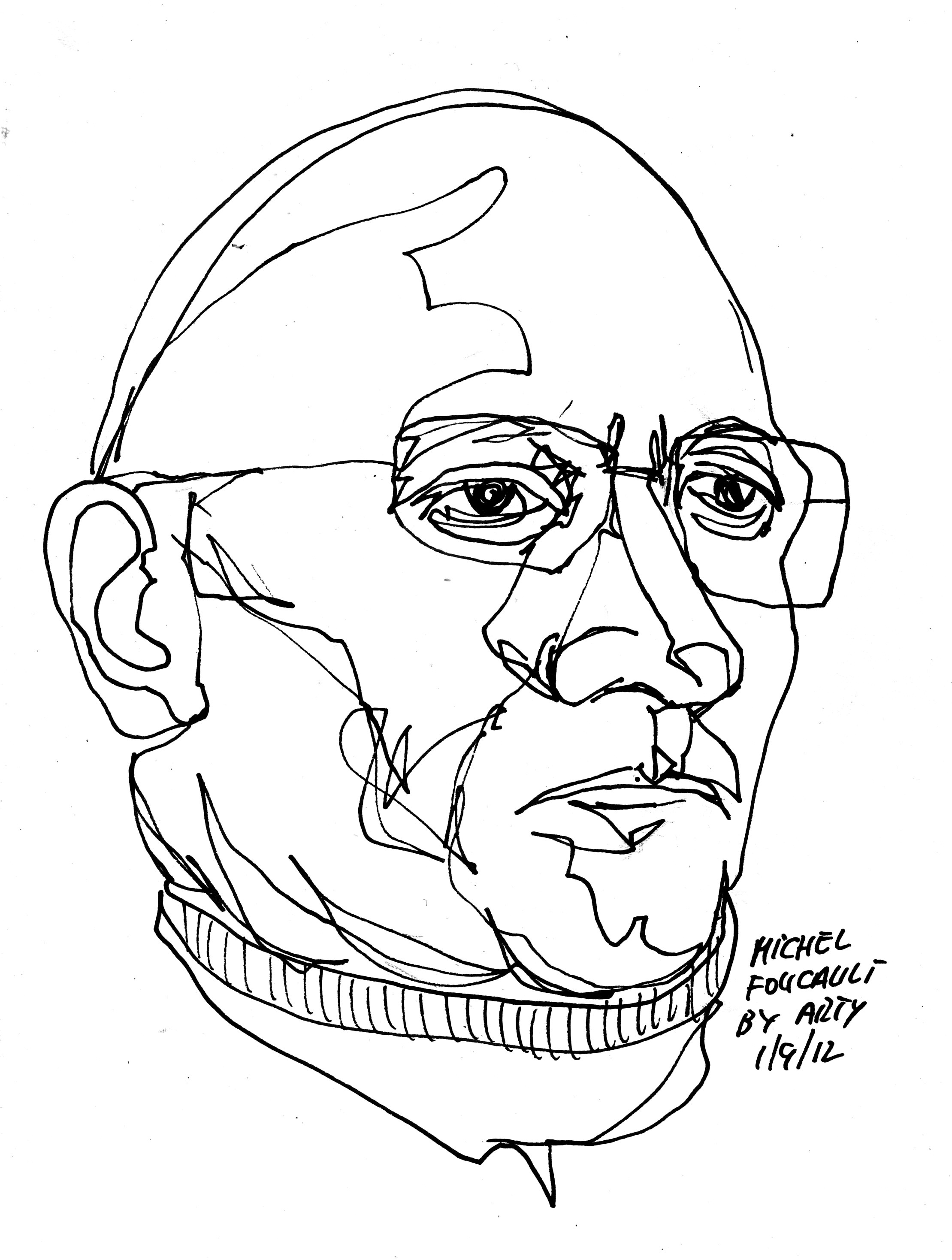
Michel Foucault

Michel Foucault (1926–1984) was a prominent twentieth-century French philosopher, who wrote prolifically. Many of his works were translated into English. Works from his later years remain unpublished.

== Monographs ==
| Original Year | Original French | English Translation |
|---|---|---|
| 1954 | Maladie mentale et personnalité Paris: Presses Universitaires de France. re-edited as Maladie mentale et psychologie (1962) | Mental Illness and Psychology translated by A. M. Sheridan-Smith. New York: Harper and Row (1976) reprinted as Madness: The Invention of an Idea. New York: Harper Perennial (2011) |
| 1961 | Histoire de la folie à l'âge classique – Folie et déraison Paris: Plon | Madness and Civilization: A History of Insanity in the Age of Reason Abridged; translated by R. Howard. London: Tavistock (1965) History of Madness Unabridged; edited by Jean Khalfa, translated Jonathan Murphy and Jean Khalfa. London: Routledge (2006) |
| 1963 | Naissance de la clinique – une archéologie du regard médical Paris: Presses Universitaires de France. | The Birth of the Clinic: An Archaeology of Medical Perception |
| 1963 | Raymond Roussel Paris: Gallimard. | Death and the Labyrinth: the World of Raymond Roussel |
| 1966 | Les mots et les choses – une archéologie des sciences humaines Paris: Gallimard. | The Order of Things: An Archaeology of the Human Sciences |
| 1969 | L'archéologie du savoir Paris: Gallimard. | Archaeology of Knowledge Translated by A. M. Sheridan Smith. London: Routledge (2002) |
| 1971 | L'ordre du discours Paris: Gallimard. | "The Discourse on Language" Pp. 215–37 in Archaeology of Knowledge. Translated by A. M. Sheridan Smith. New York: Pantheon (1972). |
| 1975 | Surveiller et punir Paris: Gallimard. | Discipline and Punish: The Birth of the Prison |
| 1976–1984 | Histoire de la sexualité: Vol I: La Volonté de savoir (1976); Vol II: L'Usage des plaisirs (1984); Vol III: Le Souci de soi (1984); Vol IV: Les aveux de la chair (2018); Paris: Gallimard. | The History of Sexuality: Vol I: The Will to Knowledge; Vol II: The Use of Pleasure; Vol III: The Care of the Self; Vol IV: The Confessions of the Flesh |

== Lectures ==
=== Collège de France Course lectures ===
| Year Given | Original French | English Translation |
|---|---|---|
| 1970–71 | La Volonté de Savoir (2011) | Lectures on the Will to Know (2013) |
| 1971–72 | Théories et Institutions Pénales (2015) | Penal Theories and Institutions (2019) |
| 1972–73 | La Société Punitive (2013) | The Punitive Society (2015) |
| 1973–74 | Le pouvoir psychiatrique (2003) | Psychiatric Power (2006) |
| 1974–75 | Les anormaux (1999) | Abnormal (2004) |
| 1975–76 | Il faut défendre la société (1997) | Society Must Be Defended (2003) |
| 1977–78 | Sécurité, territoire, population (2004) | Security, Territory, Population (2007) |
| 1978–79 | Naissance de la biopolitique (2004) | The Birth of Biopolitics (2008) |
| 1979–80 | Du gouvernement des vivants (2012) | On the Government of the Living (2014) |
| 1980–81 | Subjectivité et Vérité (2014) | Subjectivity and Truth (2017) |
| 1981–82 | L'Herméneutique du sujet (2001) | The Hermeneutics of the Subject (2005) |
| 1982–83 | Le Gouvernement de soi et des autres (2008) | The Government of Self and Others (2010) |
| 1983–84 | Le courage de la vérité (2009) | The Courage of Truth (2011) |

=== Other lectures ===
- In a 1967 lecture, titled in English as either "Different Spaces" or "Of Other Spaces" (reprinted in Aesthetics, Method, and Epistemology, and in The Visual Culture Reader, ed. Nicholas Mirzoeff), Foucault coined a novel concept of the heterotopia.
- In 1969, Foucault gave one of the most important lectures given at the Société française de philosophie, titled What Is an Author?.
- In 1983, Foucault gave a series of six lectures at the University of California at Berkeley, titled "Discourse and Truth: the Problematization of Parrhesia".

== Collaborative works ==
| Orig. Year | Original French | English Translation |
|---|---|---|
| 1973 | Moi, Pierre Rivière, ayant égorgé ma mère, ma soeur et mon frère Paris: Gallimard. | I, Pierre Riviere, Having Slaughtered my Mother, my Sister and my Brother London: Penguin Book (1975) |
| 1978 | Herculine Barbin dite Alexina B. Paris: Gallimard. | Herculine Barbin New York: Pantheon (1980) |
| 1982 | Le Désordre des familles. Lettres de cachet (with Arlette Farge) Paris: Gallimard. | Disorderly Families: Infamous Letters from the Bastille Archives Minneapolis: University of Minnesota Press (2017) |

== Other books ==
| Year | Original French | English Translation |
|---|---|---|
| 1968 | "Ceci n'est pas une pipe" | This is not a pipe (1991) |
| 1980 | Interview with Michel Foucault originally published in Italian, then in French in 1994 | Remarks on Marx (1991) |
| 2001 | Berkeley lecture series, never published in French | Fearless Speech (2001) |
| 2013 | Mal faire, dire vrai. Fonction de l'aveu en justice (2012) | Wrong-Doing, Truth-Telling: The Function of Avowal in Justice (2013) |

== Anthologies ==
In French, almost all of Foucault's shorter writings, published interviews and miscellany have been published in a collection called Dits et écrits, originally published in four volumes in 1994, latterly in only two volumes.

In English, there are a number of overlapping anthologies, which often use different translations of the overlapping pieces, frequently with different titles. Richard Lynch's bibliography of Foucault's shorter work is invaluable for keeping track of these multiple versions. The major collections in English are:

- Language, Counter-Memory, Practice, edited by Donald F. Bouchard (1977)
- Power/Knowledge, edited by C. Gordon (1980)
- The Foucault Reader, edited by P. Rabinow (1984)
- Politics, Philosophy, Culture: Interviews and Other Writings, 1977–1984, translated by A. Sheridan, edited by L. D. Kritzman (1988)
- Foucault Live (2nd ed.), edited by Sylvère Lotringer (1996)
- The Politics of Truth, edited by Sylvère Lotringer (1997)
- Ethics: subjectivity and truth (Essential Works Vol. 1), edited by P. Rabinow (1997)
- Aesthetics, Method, Epistemology (Essential Works Vol.2), edited by J. D. Faubion (1998)
- Power (Essential Works Vol. 3), edited by J. D. Faubion (2000)
- The Essential Foucault, edited by P. Rabinow and N. Rose (2003)

== Works available online ==
- Repository of texts from Foucault.info (excerpts from Discipline & punish, Archeology of knowledge, Heterotopia, History of Madness, etc.)
- Online audiorecording of Foucault at UC Berkeley, April 1983: "The Culture of the Self"
- "What are the Iranians Dreaming About?" – an excerpt from Foucault and the Iranian Revolution
- "Prison Talk" – interview with Foucault following the publication of Surveiller et punir (1975).
- First three chapters of Archaeology of Knowledge
- "Linguistics and Social Sciences" – published version of a talk given at the Centre d’études et de recherches économiques et sociales of the University of Tunis in March 1968, translated by Jonathan D. S. Schroeder and Chantal Wright.
