= Foucault's lectures at the Collège de France =

1970–1984 lectures by Michel Foucault

Lectures at the Collège de France
- Author: Michel Foucault
- Original title: Cours au Collège de France
- Translator: Graham Burchell
- Language: French
- Published: St Martin's Press
- Publication place: France
- Media type: Print (hardback & paperback)

Upon receiving the chair History of Systems of Thought, philosopher Michel Foucault gave annual lectures at the Collège de France from 1970 until his death in 1984. These lectures, in which he further advanced his work, were summarised from audio recordings and edited by Michel Senellart as Lectures at the Collège de France (French: Cours au Collège de France).

They were subsequently translated into English and further edited by Graham Burchell and published posthumously by St Martin's Press. The lectures have provided insight into various concepts like biopolitics, critique, and governmentality, which has contributed to the Foucault–Habermas debate.

== Overview of the lectures ==
Title	Year of lecture	Year of publication (in English)	Source
Lectures on the Will to Know	1970-1971	2013	
Penal Theories and Institutions	1971-1972	2019	
The Punitive Society	1972-1973	2018	
Psychiatric Power	1973-1974	2008	
Abnormal	1974-1975	2004	
Society Must be Defended	1975-1976	2003	
No lecture	1976-1977	No lecture	
Security, Territory, Population	1977-1978	2007	
The Birth of Biopolitics	1978-1979	2008	
On the Government of the Living	1979-1980	2014	
Subjectivity and Truth	1980-1981	2019	
The Hermeneutics of the Subject	1981-1982	2005	
The Government of Self and Others	1982-1983	2011	
Courage of Truth: The Government of Self and Others II	1983-1984	2012	

== Contents ==
=== Lectures on the Will to Know (1970–1971) ===
This period marks Foucault's methodological switch from 'archaeology' to 'genealogy' (though according to Foucault he never abandoned the former), as well as transition in his career and broader thought: the Dutch TV-televised Chomsky–Foucault debate of November 1971 occurred only a few months after his inaugural lecture at the Collège de France was published under the name L'ordre du discours (later translated into English and published as the appendix to The Archaeology of Knowledge, under the name "The Discourse On Language"). A week after that lecture originally took place (in December 1970), his first full lecture course was delivered at the Collège under the name "Lectures on the Will to Know"; Foucault promised to explore, "fragment by fragment," the "morphology of the will to knowledge" through alternating historical periods, inquiries and theoretical questioning.

The first phase of Foucault's thought is characterized by knowledge construction of various types and how each thread of knowledge systems combine to produce a series of networks (Foucault uses the term 'Grille') to produce a successful fully functional 'subject' and a workable fully functional human society. Foucault uses the terms epistemological indicators and epistemological breaks to show, contrary to popular opinion, that these "indicators" and "breaks" require skilled trained technical group of 'specialists' in the various knowledge fields and a trained rigorous professionalized regulatory body of which know-how on behalf of those who use the terms (discourse formations or "speech/discourse") with a professional body that can make the terms used stand up to further rational scrutiny. Scientific knowledge for Foucault isn't an advancement for human progress as is so often portrayed by the human sciences (such as the humanities and the social sciences) but is much more of a subtle method of organizing and producing firstly an individual subject, and secondly, a fully functional society functioning as a self-replicated control apparatus not as a group of 'free' atomized individuals but as a collective societal, organised (or drilled) unit both in terms of industrial production, labour power and a militarily organized unit (in the guise of armies) which is beneficial for the production of "epistemological indicators" or "breaks" enabling society to "control itself" rather than have external factors (such as the state for example) to do the job.

In the inaugural lecture course "The Will to Know", Foucault goes into detail on how the 'natural order of things' from the 16th century transpired into a fully organised human society which includes a "governmentality" apparatus and a complex machine (by "governmentality", Foucault means a state apparatus which is conceived as a scientific machine) as a rational organizing principle. This was the first time (contrary to popular opinion that this was a rather late invention in Foucault's thought) that Foucault started to go into the Greek dimensions of his thought of which he would return to in later lectures towards the end of his life. First of all a few pointers should be made explicit on certain points. Foucault mentions the western notions of money, production and trade (Greek society) starting about 800 BCE to 700 BCE. However, other 'non-western' societies also had these very same problems and is automatically assumed by some historians that these were entirely western inventions. This isn't entirely true; China and India for example had the most sophisticated trading and monetary institutions by the 6th century B.C.E., indeed the concept of a corporation existed in India from at least 800 BCE and lasted until at least 1000 C.E. Most importantly there was a social security system in India at this time. Foucault begins his notions from these lectures on the very notion of truth and the 'Will to knowledge' and the challenge is on when Foucault asks the very question of the entire western philosophical and political tradition: Namely knowledge (at least scientific knowledge) and its close association with truth is entirely desirable and is politically and philosophically natural and neutral. First of all Foucault puts these notions (at least its political notions) to a thorough test, firstly, Foucault asks the politically 'neutral' question on the very first appearance of money which became not only an important economic symbol but above all else became a measure of value and a unit of account.

Money once established as a social process and social reality had (if one could say the word) an extremely rocky and precarious history. First of all while it had a social reality but the actual social authority to use money didn't develop a standard practice or knowledge on how to use it; it was rather undisciplined. Kings and emperors could squander large taxation revenues with impunity regardless of the consequences. They could default on repayments on loans as witnessed during the Hundred Years' War and During the Anglo-French War (1627–1629). Above all else kings and monarchs could take out forced loans and get others(their subjects) to pay for these forced loans and to add insult to injury get them to pay interest on the loans at extortionate rates of interest charged on the loans because they and their advisers regarded it as their own 'income'. However, whole societies were dependent on money particularly when the whole of society had to use and be ready for its function. Money took at least 3,000 years of history to get a more disciplined approach and became the sole prerogative of the fiscal responsibility of the state after the medieval 'order of things' was entirely dismantled 'to get it right' namely; the ruthlessness and rigorous efficiency needed for its proper function and it wasn't until the 16th century with the advent of modern political economy with its analysis of production, labour and trade you then get a sense of why money, particularly its relationship with capital and its complex relationship with the rest of society conversion, from labour power into money via the essential route of surplus value became a much maligned and misunderstood category and hot potato. Foucault now is asking how is it that modern western political economy, together with political philosophy and political science came to ask the question concerning money but was utterly perplexed by it (this is a question that particularly irritated and irked Karl Marx throughout his life)? That money and its various association with production, labour, government and trade was beyond doubt but its exact relationship with the rest of society was entirely missed by economists but yet still its version of events was entirely accepted as true? Foucault begins to try to go into the whole production of truth (both philosophical and political) its whole "breaks" "discontinuity" 'epistemological unconscious' and theoretical splitting "Episteme". From this Greek period starting from 800 BCE Foucault pursues the path of scientific and political knowledge the emergence and conditions of possibility for philosophical knowledge and ends up with "the problem of political knowledge (i.e. Aristotelian notions of the political animal) of what is necessary in order to govern the city and put it right." He then divided his work on the history of systems of thought into three interrelated parts, the "re-examination of knowledge, the conditions of knowledge, and the knowing subject."

=== Penal Theories and Institutions (1971–1972) ===
In these lectures, to be published in English in 2020, Foucault used the first precursor of Discipline and Punish to study the foundations of what he calls "disciplinary institutions" (punitive power) and the productive dimensions of penalty.

=== The Punitive Society (1972–1973) ===
In these lectures, published in English in 2015, continued the investigation of power and penal institutions begun in 1971–72. Foucault spent a lot of time during this period trying to make intelligible the internal and external dynamics of what we call the prison. He questioned, "What are the relations of power which made possible the historical emergence of something like the prison?". This was correlated to three terms; firstly 'measure' "a means of establishing or restoring order, the right order, in the combat of men or the elements; but also a matrix of mathematical and physical knowledge."(treated in more detail in The Will To Knowledge lectures of 1971); Secondly the 'inquiry' "a means of establishing or restoring facts, events, actions, properties, rights; but also a matrix of empirical knowledge and natural sciences"(from the 1972 lectures Theories On Punishment and Penal Theories and Institutions) and thirdly 'the examination' treated as "the permanent control of the individual, like a permanent test with no endpoint". Foucault links the examination with 18th century Political economy and the productive labourers with the wealth they produce and the forces of production.

=== Psychiatric Power (1973–1974) ===
Foucault reveals antipsychiatry as the genealogy of a power that, in order to constitute itself as a domain of knowledge, paradoxically needed to elide the real suffering of the ill individual. Psychiatric power would have as its most basic critical proposition the thesis that the psychiatric field proceeded from practices that organized an ahistoricity of the pathological. The course is not a history of psychiatry, nor a critical evaluation of psychiatric knowledge in terms of an epistemological study of one of the most recent medical sciences. In reality, the course is the genealogy of an ahistoricity revealed by antipsychiatry as Foucault understands it.

=== Abnormal (1974–1975) ===
Influenced by the work of Georges Canguilhem, in these lectures (first published in English in 2003) Foucault explored how power defined the categories of "normality" and "abnormality" in modern psychiatry.

=== Society Must be Defended (1975–1976) ===
This series of lectures forms a trilogy with Security, Territory, Population and The Birth of Biopolitics, and it contains Foucault's first discussion of biopower. It also contains an explanation of the term "civil war" in the form of rigorous treatment of a working definition. Foucault goes into great detail how power (as Foucault saw it) becomes a battleground drifting from civil war to generalized pacification of the individual and particularly the systems he (the individual) relies upon and to which he gives loyalty: "According to this hypothesis, the role of political power is perpetually to use a sort of silent war to re-inscribe that relationship of force, and to re-inscribe it in institutions, economic inequalities, language, and even the bodies of individuals." Foucault begins to explain that this generalized form of power is not only rooted in disciplinary institutions but is also concentrated in "political sovereignty, the military, and war," so it is in turn spread evenly throughout modern society as a network of domination.

Foucault then discusses what lies behind the "academic chestnut" which could not be deciphered by his historical predecessors: namely the disjointed and discontinuous movement of history and power (bio-power). What is meant by this? For Foucault's predecessors, history was concerned by deeds of monarchs and a full list of their accomplishments in which the sovereign is presented in the text as doing all things 'great,' added to this 'greatness' of deeds this 'greatness' of the sovereign was accomplished all by the sovereign himself without any help; monument building, allegedly built by the monarch, without any help from skilled and trained professionals serves as a perfectly good example of the sovereign "greatness". However, for Foucault, this is not the case. Foucault's genealogy comes into play here where Foucault tries to build a bridge between two theoretical notions: disciplinary power (disciplinary institutions) and biopower. He investigates the constant shift throughout history between these two 'paradigms,' and what developments-from these two 'paradigms' became new subjects. The previous historical dimensions so often portrayed by historians Foucault argues, was sovereign history, which acts as a ceremonial tool for sovereign power "It glorifies and adds lustre to power. History performs this function in two modes: (1) in a "genealogical" mode (understood in the simple sense of that term) that traces the lineage of the sovereign. By the time of the 17th century with the development of mercantilism, statistics (mathematical statistics) and political economy this reaches a most vitriolic and vicious form later to be called nation states where whole populations were involved (in the guise of armies both industrial and military), in which a continuous war is enacted out not amongst ourselves (the population) but in a struggle for the state's very existence which ultimately leads to a "thanatopolitics" (a philosophical term that discusses the politics of organizing who should live and who should die (and how) in a given form of society) of the population on a large industrial scale.

This is where Foucault discusses a "counterhistory" of "race struggle or race war." According to Foucault, Marx and Engels used or borrowed the term "race" and transversed the term race into a new term called "class struggle" which later Marxist accepted and began to use. This is more partly to do with Marx's antagonistic relationship with Carl Vogt who for his time was a convinced polygenist which Marx and Engels had inherited Vogt's belief. Foucault quotes letters written by Marx to Engels in 1854 and Joseph Weydemeyer in 1852

Finally, in your place I should in general remark to the democratic gentlemen that they would do better first to acquaint themselves with bourgeois literature before they presume to yap at the opponents of it. For instance, these gentlemen should study the historical works of Augustin Thierry, François Guizot, John Wade, and others in order to enlighten themselves as to the past 'history of classes', where the history of the revolutionary project and of revolutionary practice is indissoluble from this counterhistory of races.

Foucault challenges the traditional notions of racism in explaining the operation of the modern state. When Foucault talks of racism he is not talking about what we might traditionally understand it to be–an ideology, a mutual hatred. In Foucault's reckoning modern racism is tied to power, making it something far more profound than traditionally assumed. Tracing the genealogy of racism, Foucault proposes that 'race', previously used to describe the division between two opposing societal groups distinguished from one another for example by religion or language, came to be conceived in the late 18th century in biological terms. The concept of "race war" that referred to conflict over the legitimacy of the power of the established sovereign, was "reformulated" into a struggle for existence driven by concern about the biopolitical purity of the population as a single race that could be threatened from within its own body. For Foucault "racism is born at the point when the theme of racial purity replaces that of race struggle" (p. 81).

For Foucault, racism "is an expression of a schism within society ... provoked by the idea of an ongoing and always incomplete cleaning of the social body…it structures social fields of action, guides political practice, and is realized through state apparatuses…it is concerned with biological purity and conformity with the norm" (pp. 43–44). In modern states, racism is not defined by the action of individuals, rather it is vested in the State and finds form in its structures and operation – it is state racism.

State racism serves two functions. Firstly, it makes it possible to divide the population into biological groups, "good and bad" or "superior or inferior" 'races'. Fragmented into subspecies, the population can be brought under State control. Secondly, it facilitates a dynamic relationship between the life of one person and the death of another. Foucault is clear that this relationship is not one of warlike confrontation but rather a biological one, that is not based on the individual but rather on life in general "the more inferior species die out, the more abnormal individuals are eliminated the fewer degenerates there will be in the species as a whole, and the more I – as species rather than individual – can live, the stronger I will be, the more vigorous I will be, I will be able to proliferate." (p. 255)

In effect race, defined in biological terms, "furnished the ideological foundation for identifying, excluding, combating, and even murdering others, all in the name of improving life not of an individual but of life in general" (p. 42). What is important here is that racism, inscribed as one of the modern state's basic techniques of power, allows enemies to be treated as threats, not political adversaries. But through what mechanism are these threats treated? Here the technologies of power described by Foucault become important.

Foucault argues that new technologies of power emerged in the second half of the 18th century, which Foucault termed biopolitics and biopower(Foucault uses both terms synonymously), these technologies focused on man-as-species and were concerned with optimising the state of life, with taking control of life and intervening to "make live and let die". Importantly, Foucault argues, the technologies did not replace the technologies of sovereign power with their exclusive focus on disciplining the individual body to be more productive by punishing or killing individuals, but embedded themselves into them. It was in exploring how this new power, with life as its object, could come to include the power to kill that Foucault theorizes the emergence of state racism.

Foucault argues that the modern state must at some point become involved with racism in order to function since once a State functions in a biopolitical mode it is racism alone that can justify killing. Determined as a threat to the population, the State can take action to kill in the name of keeping the population safe and thriving, healthy and pure. It is racism that allows the right to kill to be squared off with a power that seeks to improve life. State racism delivers actions that while appearing to derive from altruistic intentions, veil the murder of the "Other" Following this argument to its logical end, it is only when there is never a need for the State to claim the right to kill or to let die that State racism will disappear.

Since killing is predicated on racism, it follows that the "most murderous states are also the most racist" (p. 258). Foucault refers to the way in which Nazism and the state socialism of the Soviet Union dealt with ethnic or social groups and their political adversaries as examples of this.

Threats, however, can change over time and here the utility of 'race' a concept comes into its own. While never defining 'race', Foucault suggests that the word 'race' is "not pinned to a stable biological meaning" (p. 77). with the implication that it is a concept that is socially and historically constructed where a discourse of truth is enabled. This makes 'race' something that is easy for the State to adopt and exploit for its own purpose. 'Race' becomes a technology that is used by the state to structure threats and to make decisions over the life and death of sub-populations. In this way it helps to explain how the idea of 'race' or cultural difference are used to wage wars such as the "war on terror" or the "humanitarian war" in East Timor.

=== Security, Territory, Population (1977–1978) ===
The course deals with the genesis of a political knowledge that was to place at the centre of its concerns the notion of population and the mechanisms capable of ensuring its regulation but even of its procedures and means employed to ensure, in a given society, "the government of men". A transition from a "territorial state" to a "population state" (Nation state)? Foucault examines the notion of biopolitics and biopower as a new technology of power over populations that is distinct from punitive disciplinary systems, by tracing the history of governmentality, from the first centuries of the Christian era to the emergence of the modern nation state. These lectures illustrate a radical turning point in Foucault's work at which a shift to the problematic of the government of self and others occurred.

Foucault's challenge to himself in these series of lectures is to try and decipher the genealogical split between power in ancient and medieval society and late modern society, such as our own. By split Foucault means power as a force for manipulation of the human body. Previous notions of power failed to account for the historical subject and general shifts in techniques of power-according to Foucault's genealogy or genesis of power – it was totally denied that manipulation of the human body by unforeseen, outside forces ever existed. According to this theory, it was human ingenuity and man's ability to increase his own rationalisation was the primary motion behind social phenomena and the human subject and change was a result of increasing human reason and human conscience ingenuity. Foucault denies that any such notion had ever existed in the historical record and insists that this kind of thought is a misleading abstraction. Foucault cites the main driving force behind this set of accelerated change was the modern human sciences and the technologies both available to skilled professionals from the 16th century and a whole set of clever techniques used to shift the whole old social order into the new order of things. However, what was significant was the notion of population practised upon the entire human species on a global mass scale, not in separately locally defined areas. By population, Foucault means its fluidness and malleability, Foucault refers to 'a multiplicity of men, not to the extent that they are nothing more than individual bodies, but to the extent that they form, on the contrary, a global mass that is affected by overall processes of birth, death, production, taxation, illness and so forth, one should also take note that Foucault does not just mean population as singular event but a means of circulation tied to factors of security. What again was also significant was the idea of "freedom" the population's "freedom" which was the new modern nation state and the 'neo-discourse' erected around such notions as freedom, work and liberalism, the ideological stance of the state (mass popular democracy and the voting franchise) and the state was only too willing to recognize and give freedom for example as the object of security. Population, in Foucault's understanding, is understood as a self-regulating mass;an agglomeration or circulation of people and things which co-operate and co-produce order free from heavy state regulation the state governs less allowing the population to "govern itself". For Foucault, the freedom of population is grasped at the level of how elements of population circulate. Techniques of security enact themselves through, and upon, the circulation which occurs at the level of population. In Foucault's opinion the modern concept of population, as opposed to the ancient antiquity and medieval version of "populousness" which has in its roots going as far back as the time period of the Book of Numbers in the Old Testament Bible and the work that it sustained both in political theory and practice certainly does so; or, at least, the construction of the concept population is central to the creation of new orders of knowledge, new objects of intervention, new forms of subjectivity.

However, in order to fully understand what Foucault is trying to convey a few things should be said about the alteration techniques used that Foucault talks about in this series of lectures. The ancient and medieval version of political power was centered around a central figure who was called a king, emperor, prince or ruler (and in some cases the pope) of his principle territory whose rule was considered absolute (absolute monarchy) by both political philosophy and political theory of the day even in our time such notions still exist. Foucault uses the term "population state" to designate a new founded technology founded on the principal of security and territory which would mean a "population" to govern on a global mass with each population having its own territorial integrity(a separate nation) mapped out by experts in treaty negotiations and the new emerging field of 15th century advances in map-making technologies and the profession of cartography eventually producing in the 18th century what we now know as nation states. These technologies take place at the level of "population" Foucault argues, and with the shifting aside of the body of the king or territorial ruler. By the time of the ending of the medieval period the body (or the persona of the king) of the territorial ruler became under increasingly under financial pressure and a cursory look at the medieval financial records tends to show that the monarch could not pay back all debts due to his creditors; the monarch would easily and readily default on loans due to any creditors causing financial ruin to creditors. Foucault notices that by the time of the 18th century several changes began to take place like the re-organization of armies, an emerging industrial working population begins to appear, (both military and industrial), the emergence of the mathematical sciences, biological sciences and physical sciences which, coincidently gave birth to what Foucault calls "biopower" and a political apparatus (machine) to take care of biological (in the form of medicine and health) and political life (mass democracy and the voting franchise for the population). An apparatus (both economic and political) was required much more sophisticated than previous social organisations of previous societies had at their disposal. For example, banks, which function as financial intermediaries and tied to the apparatus of the new 'state' machine which can easily pay back any large scale debts (large debts) which the king cannot, due to the king's own financial resources being limited; the king cannot pay back, for example, the national debt, nor pay for a modern army out of his own personal resources, which can amount to trillions of US Dollars out of his own personal finances, that would be both impracticable and impossible.

=== The Birth of Biopolitics (1978–1979) ===
The Birth of Biopolitics develops further the notion of biopolitics that Foucault introduced in his lectures on "Society Must be Defended". It traces how eighteenth-century political economy marked the birth of a new governmental rationality and raises questions of political philosophy and social policy about the role and status of neo-liberalism in twentieth century politics.

Over the course of many centuries, the association between biological phenomena and human political behaviour has received a great deal of attention. Recently (the last 60 years or so) in the academic field and journals there has been some development within the field of political and biological behaviour. In his College de France lecture course of January 1978, Foucault used the term Biopolitics (not for the first time) to denote politic power over every aspect of human life. Why did Foucault use the term 'biopolitics' in the first place? The term has many different meanings to many different people and to fully understand the term as Foucault saw and used and understood it, we have to look at the very different meanings of the concept. For Foucault the term means to him the association between biological phenomena and human political behaviour maximizing and increasing the human abilities machine (as we know the term). Over the course of evolutionary time this abilities machine of man becomes species specific, such as language capabilities, neuronal and cognitive capabilities so on and so forth. This then becomes over the course of the history of discursive technologies of scientific knowledge, Foucault argues, a field of knowledge established by groups of experts in disciplines, such as astronomy, biology, chemistry, geoscience, physics, anthropology, archaeology, linguistics, psychology, sociology, and history.

The study of a new and rigorous discipline allied together with a new language (discourse technologies) in which a grasp of the new language is needed developing into a powerful force in the political realm as well as biological evolution the two become powerful allies (both biology and politics). Genetics and the change that develops (over time) over the course of the human organism existence. However, the two become co-joined unwittingly but one of them both political philosophy and political science have specific problems, both cannot have or lay claim to independent knowledge which is problematic for both lines of thought. Not in the case of ideology (as in Marxism) but in the case of discursive technologies. Foucault insists that the scientific knowledge being presented by historians is not an endeavour by the whole of humankind, particularly when written about by historians who claim that 'man' invented the sciences anymore than the Nazi represented the whole of humankind and the whole of humankind were to blame for the Nazi atrocities the ultimate embodiment of evil. But is, for all attempts and purposes a collaborative enterprise by groups of specially trained specialists producing a scientific community who have unfettered access to the whole of society through their scientific knowledge and expertise.

Change does indeed happen both within the organism and the organisms properties, the specific species is unable to correct them directly and biological change moves beyond any individual or single member of the species. However, these changes are aimed at the species as a whole and characteristics and traits are retained both at the biological, ecological and environmental level. In the human sciences (biology and genetics) these changes happen at a genetic and biological level which are unalterable and transpire from one generation to the next not at the individual level of the species. This is at the heart of the core theory of Charles Darwin and his proponents and the theory of evolution and natural selection. Foucault's analysis try's to show that contrary to previous thought that the modern human sciences were somehow an obscure universal objective source which somehow had an absence of any lineage, took over the role of the Christian church in disciplining the body by replacing the soul and confession of the Catholic church plus also the specific director of the process which in this case would be the deity (God), with indefinite supervision and discipline. However, these new techniques required a new 'director(s)' or 'editor(s)' who replaced the priestly and Pharaonic versions of much similar past vintages. These new governmental mechanism based upon the right of sovereignty and law both supported the fixed hierarchical organisation of the previous mode of feudal governmental mechanism, but stripping the modern human subject of any kind of self autonomy; not only fully fit for indoctrination, work, and education a fully fit conversant subject but left them vulnerable as well to face a permanent exam which he(the ordinary individual) had no chance in passing and was supposed to fail with no end point. Foucault maintains that these techniques were deliberate, cold, calculating and ruthless; the human sciences, far from being "a way at looking at the world" the knowledge/power dynamic/relationship paradigm was a 'cheap' efficient and 'cost' effective method into a way of producing a subjugated and docile human subject (not only a citizen, but a political and productive citizen) as an instrument for administrative control and concern (through the state) for the well-being of the population(and a constant help to the spread of biopower) with the help of scientific classifications and new disciplinary technologies including the polity readily available to the human body and mind. Here are a few examples on what Foucault means by this type of "biopower" and bio-history of man:

Elizabeth Loftus is well known for her research in the area of memory. In this book, she examines the way memories are encoded and the various ways they can be altered. Forensic psychologists are frequently called upon to assess the veracity of eyewitness testimony. Loftus makes a strong argument against the eyewitness, with a multitude of studies that have demonstrated the unreliability of their reports. New memories can be implanted and old memories altered with ease, and this renders memories susceptible to tampering. The manner in which a question is posed can alter or implant a memory. The multiple-choice style versus the open-ended style of questions are examples of this. The latter allows the witness to respond with "I don't know", whereas the former demands a response. Loftus has found that people unknowingly convince themselves of an answer when forced to give one. With numerous real-life examples, ranging from how we retain and retrieve memories to the differences in eyewitness ability, this book is vital to the understanding of forensic psychology.

In this three-volume series, Yochelson and Samenow examine the criminal personality. The series starts at the first encounter with the offender and continues through to the process of change. It includes the issue of drug use in this population. The authors have detailed their research with what they termed "the criminal mind". Their definition of the criminal strongly resembles the description of antisocial personality disorder and psychopathy. During the early stages of their research, Yochelson and Samenow limited their work to observation, without any attempt at treatment. They detailed 52 features of criminal thinking that needed to be changed for rehabilitation to be a possibility. Patterns of deception are established early in this population, and others' rights are characteristically disregarded. When arrested, members of this population tend to see themselves as victims and to believe that they are good people despite their lengthy criminal records. Over time, a treatment plan, or "process of change", was defined, holding that change was most likely to occur in this population when the individual was vulnerable and desirous of change. The desire for change must be accompanied by an in-depth knowledge of what needs to be changed. Finally, change is only possible when the long-term benefits of change outweigh the benefits of maintaining a criminal lifestyle. Overall, change is considered a possibility, although not a common one. These three volumes comprise the most detailed, long-term examination of the criminal mind documented.

Linguists have testified in legal cases implicating a wide range of linguistic levels, e.g., phonetics, phonology, morphology, syntax, semantics, pragmatics, and variations. Legal issues have included the following: statutory and contract language ambiguity; comprehensibility of jury instructions; problems with verbatim transcripts; spoken language as evidence of intent; adequacy of warning labels on consumer products; verbal offences (libel, slander); compliance with plain-language requirements; trademark and copyright infringement; informed consent; and the regulation of advertising language by the Federal Trade Commission in the US. The best-known and most experienced forensic linguist in North America is Roger Shuy, whose name was for a number of years synonymous with forensic linguistics in the role of trial consultant or expert.

As with the most recent discovery of mirror neurons has demonstrated Foucault has (while these techniques used in Psychiatry and Psychology are not mentioned alongside Foucault's name) hit on something that rigorous research methods may prove beyond a reasonable doubt that manipulation of social phenomena(which includes the human body and the mind) is most certainly possible. Techniques developed from the First and Second World war which started out as field experiments, among military personnel, were then extended into ordinary civilian life; techniques borrowed from the Human cognitive sciences and found its way into psychoanalysis, psychiatry, psychology, clinical psychology, Lightner Witmer and clinical psychiatry (see this encyclopedia's article on Political abuse of psychiatry): "Mobilisation and manipulation of human needs as they exist in the consumer". He (Ernest Dichter) "was the first to coin the term focus group and to stress the importance of image and persuasion in advertising". In Vance Packard's book The Hidden Persuaders, Dichter is mentioned extensively. Subjectivation, a term Foucault coined for this purpose in which Biological life itself is given over to constant testing and research(an examination) without ever ending. One could argue; who are these new experts answerable to? Foucault argues that these new experts are answerable to absolutely no one. Just like previous notions of the past, absolute monarchy and divine rights of kings were answerable to nobody, their predecessors are just replacements of the past these new experts have now been democratised. Where mans body (and his soul) his mind can be manipulated and altered and is liable to be vulnerable. Every single aspect of the human subject is ripe for "subjectification" and the technology-as it stands today-is unknown to us. This biological allegory of man carries with it endless possibilities from the perspective of the biological sciences and physical sciences. The above extractions clearly show this "biopower" of man requires man himself to administer these sophisticated technologies, where one group of experts or professionals(the enquiry) can completely subjugate another producing new human subjects(and new experts) through their expertise at manipulating social phenomena. In these few examples and according to this view: "the criminal is treated like a cancer", whereas human nature does not change which is the only society that ever gets produced, past, present or future.

=== On the Government of the Living (1979–1980) ===
In the On the Government of the Living lectures delivered in the early months of 1980, Foucault begins to ask questions of Western man obedience to power structures unreservedly and the pressing question of Government: "Government of children, government of souls and consciences, government of a household, of a state, or of oneself." Or governmentality, as Foucault prefers to call it, although he fleshes out the development of that concept in his earlier lectures titled "Security, Territory, Population." Foucault tries to trace the kernel of "the genealogy of obedience" in western society. The 1980 lectures attempt to relate the historical foundations of "our obedience"—which must be understood as the obedience of the Western subject. Foucault argues confessional techniques are an innovation of the Christian West intended to guarantee men's obedience to structures of power in return, so the belief goes, for Christian salvation. In his summary of the course Foucault asks the question: "How is it that within Western Christian culture, the government of men requires, on the part of those who are led, in addition to acts of obedience and submission, 'acts of truth,' which have this particular character that not only is the subject required to speak truthfully but to speak truthfully about himself?" The reader should take note here that much of this kind of work has been done before, albeit in what is best described as brilliant, lost and forgotten scholarship by such scholars as Ernst Kantorowicz (his work on the body politic and the king's two bodies), Percy Ernst Schramm, Carl Erdmann, Hermann Kantorowicz, Frederick Pollock and Frederick Maitland. However, Foucault was after the genealogical dynamics and his main thrust was "regimes of truth" and the emergence and gradual development of "reflexive acts of truth". Foucault locates the very beginning of this act of obedience to power structures and the truth that they bring to the first Christian institutions between the 2nd century and the 5th century C.E. This is where Foucault starts to use his main tool—that is genealogy as his main focus and it is with this genealogical tool that you finally get to understand fully what genealogy actually means. Foucault goes into great painstaking detail into the Christian baptism and its contingency and discontinuity in order to find "the genealogy of confession". This is an attempt—argues Foucault—to write a "political history of the truth".

=== Subjectivity and Truth (1980–1981) ===
In Subjectivity and Truth, Foucault undertakes a deep analysis of sexuality, sexual ethics, and marriage. He looks at the evolving concept of relationships, marriage, and spouses as historical constructs.

=== The Hermeneutics of the Subject (1981–1982) ===
In these lectures, Foucault develops notions on the ability of the concept of truth to shift through time as described by the modern human sciences (for example ethnology) in contrast to ancient society (Aristotelian notions). It discusses how these notions are accepted as truth and produce the self as true. This is followed by a discussion on the existence of this truth and the discourse of truth for the experience of the self.

=== The Government of Self and Others (1982–1983) ===
The final two years of lectures deal with the concept of parrhesia, translated by Foucault as 'frank speech' and the relationship between the political and the self.

=== The Courage of Truth (1983–1984) ===
The last course Foucault gave at the Collège de France was delayed by illness, for which Foucault received treatment in January 1984. The lectures were ultimately delivered over nine consecutive Wednesdays in February and March of that year. In several of the lectures, Foucault complains of suffering from a bad flu and apologizes for his diminished strength. Although relatively little was known about AIDS at the time, there are several indications that Foucault already suspected he had contracted the virus.

The content of the course expands on the analysis of parrhesia Foucault developed during the previous year, with renewed focus on Plato, Socrates, Cynicism, and Stoicism. On February 15, Foucault delivered a moving lecture on the death of Socrates and the meaning of Socrates' last words. On March 28, twelve weeks before he succumbed to AIDS-related complications, Foucault delivered his final lecture. His last words at the lectern were:

...Only by deciphering the truth of self in this world, deciphering oneself with mistrust of oneself and the world, and in fear and trembling before God, will enable us to have access to the true life. It was by this reversal, which put the truth of life before the true life that Christian asceticism fundamentally modified an ancient asceticism which always aspired to lead both the true life and the life of truth at the same time, and which, in Cynicism at least, affirmed the possibility of leading this true life of truth.

There you are, listen, I had things to say to you about the general framework of these analyses. But, well, it is too late. So, thank you.
