= Foucauldian discourse analysis =

Discourse analysis focusing on power relations

Foucauldian discourse analysis is a form of discourse analysis, focusing on power relationships in society as expressed through language and practices, and based on the theories of Michel Foucault.

== Overview ==
=== Subject of analysis ===
Besides focusing on the meaning of a given discourse, the distinguishing characteristic of this approach is its stress on power relationships. These are expressed through language and behaviour, and the relationship between language and power. This form of analysis developed out of Foucault's genealogical work, where power was linked to the formation of discourse within specific historical periods. Some versions of this method stress the genealogical application of discourse analysis to illustrate how discourse is produced to govern social groups. The method analyses how the social world, expressed through language, is affected by various sources of power. As such, this approach is close to social constructivism, as the researcher tries to understand how our society is being shaped (or constructed) by language, which in turn reflects existing power relationships. The analysis attempts to understand how individuals view the world, and studies categorizations, personal and institutional relationships, ideology, and politics.

The approach was inspired by the work of both Michel Foucault and Jacques Derrida, and by critical theory.

Foucauldian discourse analysis, like much of critical theory, is often used in politically oriented studies. It is preferred by scholars who criticize more traditional forms of discourse analysis as failing to account for the political implications of discourse. Political power is gained by those in power being more knowledgeable and therefore more legitimate in exercising their control over others in both blatant and invisible ways.

=== Process ===
Kendall and Wickham outline five steps in using "Foucauldian discourse analysis". The first step is a simple recognition that discourse is a body of statements that are organized in a regular and systematic way. The subsequent four steps are based on the identification of rules on:

- how those statements are created;
- what can be said (written) and what cannot;
- how spaces in which new statements can be made are created;
- making practices material and discursive at the same time.

=== Areas of study ===
Studies employing the Foucauldian discourse analysis might look at how figures in authority use language to express their dominance, and request obedience and respect from those subordinate to them. The disciplinary interaction between authority and their followers emphasize the power dynamic found within the relationships. In a specific example, a study may look at the language used by teachers towards students, or military officers towards conscripts. This approach could also be used to study how language is used as a form of resistance to those in power.

== L'Ordre du discours ==
L'Ordre du discours (The Order of Discourse) is Michel Foucault's inaugural lecture at the Collège de France, delivered on December 2, 1970. Foucault presents the hypothesis that in any society the production of discourse is controlled, in order to eliminate powers and dangers and contain random events in this production.

=== Speech control and exclusion procedures ===
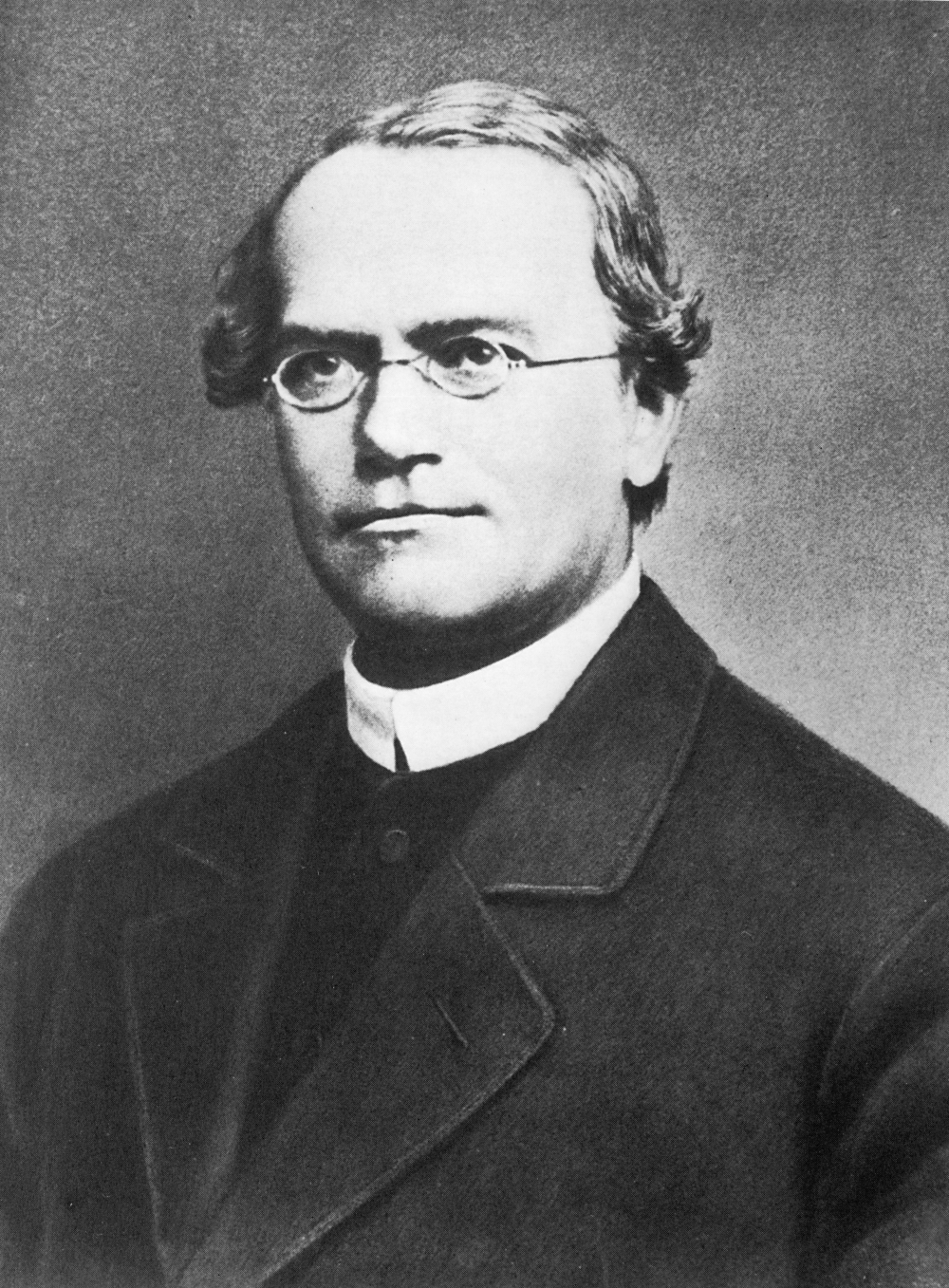
"Mendel told the truth, but he was not in the true biological discourse of his time", says Foucault regarding the disciplines.

Foucault presents the hypothesis that, in every society, the production of discourses is controlled with the aim of: 1. exorcising its powers and dangers; 2. reducing the force of uncontrollable events; 3. hide the real forces that materialize the social constitution. To this end, he theorizes that external or internal procedures are used.

==== External procedures ====
These procedures are exercised from the outside and function as systems of exclusion, insofar as they concern the part of the discourse that puts power and desire into play. The three great systems of this type are: the prohibited word, the division of madness and the will to truth.

- Prohibition: definition of what can be said in each circumstance. It is divided into three: taboo of the object, ritual of the circumstance and privileged or exclusive right of the speaker.
- Division of madness: the madman's speech, according to Foucault, "cannot be transmitted like that of others": either he is considered null, or he is endowed with special powers, such as predicting the future.
- Will to truth: the will to truth and the institutions that surround it exert pressure on discursive production. He cites as an example the subordination of Western literature to the credible and natural imposed by science.

==== Internal procedures ====
These procedures start from the speech itself with the function of classifying, ordering and dictating its distribution; the discourses themselves exercise their own control and are characterized by serving as principles of classification, ordering and distribution to dominate the dimension of discourse related to what happens and to chance. This title includes the commentary, the author and the organization into disciplines.

- Commentary: there is a gap between the recurring discourses ("speak themselves"), constantly revisited, and the commonplace ones ("are spoken"). Those that resort to larger ones are called commentaries. Through this gap there is the possibility of creating different discourses, where comments, regardless of their apparent novelty, will always be a repetition of the first text.
- Author: it should not be understood as the individual who produces the speech, but rather as a "discourse grouping principle", a section of that individual. It is through the role of the author that the individual will distinguish what to write or not, what will go into his work within everything he says every day.
- Disciplines: principle that results from the delimitation of a "field of truth" where the discourse must be inserted. This field concerns the rules imposed for the construction of a discourse in a given field of knowledge (such as botany or medicine, which relate to its construction) as well as "a domain of objects, a set of methods, a body of propositions considered true, a set of rules and definitions, techniques and instruments" necessary for their acceptance within the "true" of a given discipline.

== See also ==
- Biopower
- Critical discourse analysis
- Cultural studies
- Deconstruction
- Difference (philosophy)
- Discipline and Punish
- Discourse
- Discourse analysis
- Foucault's lectures at the College de france
- Michel Foucault bibliography
- Post-structuralism
- Postmodernism
- power/knowledge
- The Archaeology of Knowledge
- The History of Sexuality
