= Ecogovernmentality =

Area of study in political ecology

Ecogovernmentality (or environmentality), is the application of Foucault's concepts of biopower and governmentality to the analysis of the regulation of social interactions with the natural world. The concept of Ecogovernmentality expands on Foucault's genealogical examination of the state to include ecological rationalities and technologies of government (Malette, 2009). Begun in the mid-1990s by a small body of theorists (Luke, Darier, and Rutherford) the literature on ecogovernmentality grew as a response to the perceived lack of Foucauldian analysis of environmentalism and in environmental studies.

Following Michel Foucault, writing on ecogovernmentality focuses on how government agencies, with producers of expert knowledge, construct "The Environment." This construction is viewed both in terms of the creation of an object of knowledge and a sphere within which certain types of intervention and management are created and deployed to further the government's larger aim of managing the lives of its constituents. This governmental management is dependent on the dissemination and internalization of knowledge/power among individual actors. This creates a decentered network of self-regulating elements whose interests become integrated with those of the State.

Ecogovernmentality is part of the broader area of political ecology. It can be situated within the ongoing debates over how to balance concern with socio-natural relationships with attention to the actual environmental impact of specific interactions. The term is most useful to authors like Bryant, Watts and Peet who argue for the importance of a phenomenology of nature that builds from post-structuralist concerns with knowledge, power and discourse. In addition, it is of particular use to geographers because of its ability to link place based socio-environmental phenomena with the non-place based influences of both national and international systems of governance. Particularly, for studies of environmental changes that extend beyond the borders one particular region, ecogovernmentality can prove a useful analytical tool for tracing the manifestations of specific policy across scales ranging from the individual, the community, the state and on to larger structures of international environmental governance.

== Resource management and the state ==
Work done by Rutherford, on US Environmental Impact Assessments, and by Agrawal on local forest governance in India, are examples of this method of analysis. Both illustrate how the production of specific types of expert knowledge (statistical models of pollution, or the economic productivity of forests) coupled with specific technologies of government (the EIA assessment regime or local Forest Stewardship Councils) can bring individual interest in line with those of the state. This, not through the imposition of specific outcomes, but by creating frameworks that rationalizes behavior in particular ways and involve individuals in the process of problem definition and intervention.

Within a geographical context, this type of analysis provides insight into how territory is brought under state control, and how the regulation of human interaction with this territory is achieved. Focusing on the evolution of techniques of cartography, systems of natural classification, and early attempts at scientific resource management in the 18th and 19th centuries, Braun (2000, 2003) and Scott (1998) show how new systems of knowledge extend systems of governmentality into the natural world. Fundamental to this analysis is a connection between the abstract utilitarian logic employed by states and the shape of the territory under their control. In Scott, for example, measuring nature in terms of concepts of production and natural resources "allowed the state to impose that logic on the very reality that was observed" (Scott, 14). The complex natural systems of a given place are first depicted as simplified sites of managed resource extraction. As part of this management their ecological composition is changed (through types of planting, harvesting and extraction) in an attempt to make them resemble more closely the simplified statistical systems with which they are measured.

In this manifestation, which focuses primarily on the administration of particular resources at a national level, ecogovernmentality is linked to the larger governmental aims identified by Foucault of securing the wellbeing of its inhabitants by managing "a complex composed of men and things" (93). Scott's work on scientific forestry in early modern Europe shows how the rational models constructed by state foresters were part of the larger body of statistical knowledge created to manage population and facilitate "taxation, political control, and conscription" (23). Likewise, Braun's analysis of the Geological Survey of Canada creates a clear link between methods of measuring and representing the mineral composition of a territory, and the structures of government put in place both to create the concept of a unified nation and "to manage individuals, goods and wealth so as to improve the condition of the state’s population" (27).

Here, ecogovernmentality is seen as a subset of concerns within of the larger Foucauldian concept. But implicit in this is an important claim: that the types of knowledge produced in the process of making nature intelligible to the state have an important influence on the evolution of state rationality itself, an influence not adequately covered in Foucault's original formulation. They seek to add to Foucault's discussion of population and the operation of systems of knowledge/power that normalized certain ways of acting and being and marginalized others. Building on Foucault's brief references to "resources, means of subsistence [and] the territory with its specific qualities"(93), their contribution is the investigation of the parallel systems of measuring and assigning value to the natural world (the "crop" and the "weed" (Scott, 13) acting as homologies to categories like "sanity" and "insanity" in Foucault's work) and to give these their due in discussions of the formation of state rationality and structures of governmentality.

== Eco-power and discipline ==
The work of Timothy Luke pushes the reach of this concept further, by envisaging a radically different relationship between governmentality and ecogovernmentality. He argues that the ecological domain has become the "ultimate domain of being"(150) the key location for the production of knowledge and power. Following Foucault, Luke traces this transformation back to a specific historical moment, the period of the early 70s encompassing the oil crisis and the détente between the USSR and the US. From these beginnings, environmental considerations grow, fertilized during the 1980s by the formation of international bodies, like the UN World Commission on Environment and Development, and increased concern and awareness over ecological limits to human development. The result is the "environmentalization" of the production and exercise of knowledge and power. Reversing the earlier focus on the integration of environmental knowledge into broader state projects of socio-economic management, here it is these projects themselves which are reshaped by new forms of environmental knowledge (specifically the concepts of "ecology" and "sustainability"). It is this new structure that becomes known as Ecogovernmentality.

Luke argues that heightened awareness of social vulnerability to environmental factors coupled with the increased importance of macro-economic competition (rather than Cold-War military confrontation) in geo-political power struggles led to the rise of sustainable development as the synthesis of these two interrelated concerns. The disciplinary power of governmentality is refigured as "enviro-discipline", a broader concept that "expresses the authority of eco-knowledgeable, geo-powered forces to police the fitness of all biological organisms and the health of their natural environments" (146). This constitutes an important expansion of the object of governmental rule and the area to be managed. Foucault's focus on "population" now includes "all of life’s biodiversity" (Luke, 122) and, given the interconnected nature of environmental systems, states must now seek to extend their control far outside of their territorial boundaries to ensure the security and productivity of their population (Luke 134).

Uniting both broad and narrow definitions of Ecogovernmentality is the attention paid to environmental subject formation, or the creation of environmental subject positions. Definitions of these subject positions vary from Darrier's (1999) construction of the environmental subject as a site for resistance to consumerism and the commodification of the relationship between the individual and the environment, through Agrawal's broadly neutral concept of "environmentality" which denotes an acceptance on the part of the individual that nature is an object to be managed and their accompanying involvement in this process, to Luke's (1999) assertion that "the environment emerges as a ground for normalizing individual behavior" that supersedes the previous influences of "the ethical concerns of family, community and nation" (149). Underlying these divergent definitions, is the common claim that the relationship between individual and environment is key to current analysis of systems of state management and governmentality.

== Ecogovernmentality and climate change ==
Since about 2002, scholars have analyzed the discourses surrounding global climate change and related policies using ideas from Foucault and from ecogovernmentality.

This subfield or application of ecogovernmentality developed first by applying Foucauldean thought to analysis of national and international climate regimes, identifying categories and methodologies that work particularly well for climate change issues. As the application of ecogovernmentality to climate change has evolved, the principles of the theory have also been applied — in appropriately modified ways — to studies of state and local government as well as private and nonprofit organizations.

Ecogovernmentality-grounded theories and methods of analysis have also begun to emerge as tools for examining climate change in fields outside political economy, such as communications and international relations.

=== Development of ecogovernmentality and climate change studies ===
As researchers began to explore the application of ecogovernmentality to climate change problems and discourses, most studies focused on national and global scales. For example, an early study by Paul Henman applied governmentality to Australian national policy and climate change modeling, concluding that modeling was a technology for rendering climate governable though it would limit the capacity of government to respond. Sverker Jagers and Johannes Stripple's work published in 2003 identified the importance of non-nation-state actors (NNSAs) in climate change mitigation and adaptation efforts and suggested that "private regimes" like the insurance industry may be more successful than national and global power structures in addressing the problem.

Studies applying governmentality to climate change picked up in frequency in the mid-2000s. Angela Oels’ 2005 paper summarizes the initial forays into governmentality-based analyses for climate change discourses and suggested that the functioning governmentality of the issue had shifted since the 1980s, from a biopower-based discourse to one rooted in advanced liberal government. She demonstrated a method of discourse analysis particularly suited for addressing climate change, examining objectives, fields of visibility, technical aspects, forms of knowledge and formation of identities. Oels also provided some categories into which discourses can be sorted. These categories were also used by Karin Bäckstrand and Eva Lövbrand, beginning in 2006 with analysis of tree-planting initiatives stemming from the Kyoto Protocol. Their analysis of competing discourses in categories of ecological modernization, green governmentality, and civic environmentalism revealed areas of overlap and potential cooperation.

Also in 2006, Maria Carmen Lemos collaborated with Agrawal on a comprehensive summary of environmental governance studies to that date. They divided the applications of these studies into two categories: resource management and climate change. Among other useful insights, their work provided a clear schematic for classifying new, hybrid forms of environmental governance and identifying where these forms derive their power — that is, from combinations of the state, the community, and the market.

=== Ecogovernmentality studies beyond global and national regimes ===
More recent studies have applied ecogovernmentality precepts to discourses at state and local levels. Chukwumerije Okereke, Harriet Bulkeley and Heike Schroeder published a study in 2009 that examined possible problems of power, relationships, structures, and agency in climate governance at scales other than national or global. They suggested that examining these issues may help to overcome what they identify as an "impasse" in governmentality studies of global environmental problems.

As another example of an ecogovernmentality study of climate change at a non-global, non-national scale, Bulkeley's 2010 paper examined network governance, vertical and horizontal power structures, political economics, the restructuring of the state, and institutional capacity, all at the urban scale. Bulkeley argued for the importance of nuanced analyses of government at non-national, non-global scales as an important field in climate change governmentality studies.

A survey study from Dallas Elgin, Andrew Pattison and Christopher M. Weible in 2011 examines analytical capacity regarding climate change at the (U.S.) state level, concluding that the neoliberal government there is not as "hollowed out" as they expected but still lacks needed analytical capacity.

=== Emerging influence in other fields ===
Ecogovernmentality-grounded studies in climate change are also emerging in fields outside political economy. For example, Max Boykoff's work analyzing media coverage of climate change in his 2011 book was grounded in discourses analysis along with his perhaps-better-known content analysis methods. Peter Weingart, Anita Engels and Petra Pansegrau published a study using a similar combination of methods in 2000, but Boykoff's work was cited in An Inconvenient Truth and has received far more scholarly and public attention. Other media studies scholars have followed Boykoff's lead incorporating discourses analysis in their work.

In another communications-related study, David Ockwell, Lorraine Whitmarsh and Saffron O’Neill applied governmentality concepts to a U.K. government marketing campaign aimed at increasing "green" behaviors in citizens. In their analysis of why the campaign was ineffective, they identify regime-based barriers to behavior change, including infrastructure, financial, and structural barriers.

Chris Methmann has published work on global warming as a form of global governmentality in the field of international relations, citing the carbon market as a means of conducting individual conduct from a global scale. He concluded that the Clean Development Mechanism of carbon credit trading has become easily established because it protects "business as usual" – the established order of power.

Robyn Dowling argued for inclusion of ecogovernmentality perspectives regarding identity formation in the field of human geography in her 2008 paper, which addressed a variety of issues, including climate change.
