= Randy K. Lippert =

Randy K. Lippert is Professor of Criminology at University of Windsor. He received his Ph.D. from the University of British Columbia. He has published twelve books and 95 journal articles and book chapters mostly focused on sanctuary practices, security, surveillance, crime prevention, condominia, business improvement districts, and public policing. He is best known for his condominium, sanctuary, policing/security and urban research and for theoretical contributions to refining governmentality perspectives that were inspired by the later writings and lectures of Michel Foucault.

== Selected publications ==
- Condo Conquest: Urban Governance, Law, and Condoization in New York City and Toronto. UBC Press (2019).
- A Criminology of Policing and Security Frontiers. University of Bristol Press, 2019.
- National Security, Surveillance and Terror: Canada and Australia in Comparative Perspective. (2016).
- Governing Practices: Neo-Liberalism, Governmentality, and the Ethnographic Imaginary. University of Toronto Press. (2016).
- Corporate Security in the 21st Century: Theory and Practice in International Perspective. Palgrave-MacMillan (2014).
- Eyes Everywhere: The Global Growth of Camera Surveillance. Routledge (2012).
