= The Birth of Biopolitics =

Part of a lecture series by Michel Foucault

The Birth of Biopolitics: Lectures at the Collège de France, 1978-1979
- Author: Michel Foucault
- Translator: Graham Burchell
- Language: French
- Published: St Martin's Press
- Publication place: France
- Media type: Print (hardback & paperback)
- OCLC: 214282391

The Birth of Biopolitics is a part of a lecture series by French philosopher Michel Foucault at the Collège de France between 1978 and 1979 and published posthumously. In it, Foucault develops further the notion of biopolitics introduced in a previous lecture series, Security, Territory, Population.

== Content ==
The Birth of Biopolitics develops further the notion of biopolitics that Foucault introduced in his lectures on "Society Must be Defended". It traces how eighteenth-century political economy marked the birth of a new governmental rationality and raises questions of political philosophy and social policy about the role and status of neo-liberalism in twentieth century politics.

Over the course of many centuries, the association between biological phenomena and human political behaviour has received a great deal of attention. Recently (the last 60 years or so) in the academic field and journals there has been some development within the field of political and biological behaviour. In his College de France lecture course of January 1978, Foucault used the term Biopolitics (not for the first time) to denote politic power over every aspect of human life. Why did Foucault use the term 'biopolitics' in the first place? The term has many different meanings to many different people and to fully understand the term as Foucault saw and used and understood it, we have to look at the very different meanings of the concept. For Foucault the term means to him the association between biological phenomena and human political behaviour maximizing and increasing the human abilities machine (as we know the term). Over the course of evolutionary time this abilities machine of man becomes species specific, such as language capabilities, neuronal and cognitive capabilities so on and so forth. This then becomes over the course of the history of discursive technologies of scientific knowledge, Foucault argues, a field of knowledge established by groups of experts in disciplines, such as astronomy, biology, chemistry, geoscience, physics, anthropology, archaeology, linguistics, psychology, sociology, and history.

The study of a new and rigorous discipline allied together with a new language (discourse technologies) in which a grasp of the new language is needed developing into a powerful force in the political realm as well as biological evolution the two become powerful allies (both biology and politics). Genetics and the change that develops (over time) over the course of the human organism existence. However, the two become co-joined unwittingly but one of them both political philosophy and political science have specific problems, both cannot have or lay claim to independent knowledge which is problematic for both lines of thought. Not in the case of ideology (as in Marxism) but in the case of discursive technologies. Foucault insists that the scientific knowledge being presented by historians is not an endeavour by the whole of humankind, particularly when written about by historians who claim that 'man' invented the sciences anymore than the Nazi represented the whole of humankind and the whole of humankind were to blame for the Nazi atrocities the ultimate embodiment of evil. But is, for all attempts and purposes a collaborative enterprise by groups of specially trained specialists producing a scientific community who have unfettered access to the whole of society through their scientific knowledge and expertise.

Change does indeed happen both within the organism and the organisms properties, the specific species is unable to correct them directly and biological change moves beyond any individual or single member of the species. However, these changes are aimed at the species as a whole and characteristics and traits are retained both at the biological, ecological and environmental level. In the human sciences (biology and genetics) these changes happen at a genetic and biological level which are unalterable and transpire from one generation to the next not at the individual level of the species. This is at the heart of the core theory of Charles Darwin and his proponents and the theory of evolution and natural selection. Foucault's analysis try's to show that contrary to previous thought that the modern human sciences were somehow an obscure universal objective source which somehow had an absence of any lineage, took over the role of the Christian church in disciplining the body by replacing the soul and confession of the Catholic church plus also the specific director of the process which in this case would be the deity (God), with indefinite supervision and discipline. However, these new techniques required a new 'director(s)' or 'editor(s)' who replaced the priestly and Pharaonic versions of much similar past vintages. These new governmental mechanism based upon the right of sovereignty and law both supported the fixed hierarchical organisation of the previous mode of feudal governmental mechanism, but stripping the modern human subject of any kind of self autonomy; not only fully fit for indoctrination, work, and education a fully fit conversant subject but left them vulnerable as well to face a permanent exam which he(the ordinary individual) had no chance in passing and was supposed to fail with no end point. Foucault maintains that these techniques were deliberate, cold, calculating and ruthless; the human sciences, far from being "a way at looking at the world" the knowledge/power dynamic/relationship paradigm was a 'cheap' efficient and 'cost' effective method into a way of producing a subjugated and docile human subject (not only a citizen, but a political and productive citizen) as an instrument for administrative control and concern (through the state) for the well-being of the population(and a constant help to the spread of biopower) with the help of scientific classifications and new disciplinary technologies including the polity readily available to the human body and mind. Here are a few examples on what Foucault means by this type of "biopower" and bio-history of man:

Elizabeth Loftus is well known for her research in the area of memory. In this book, she examines the way memories are encoded and the various ways they can be altered. Forensic psychologists are frequently called upon to assess the veracity of eyewitness testimony. Loftus makes a strong argument against the eyewitness, with a multitude of studies that have demonstrated the unreliability of their reports. New memories can be implanted and old memories altered with ease, and this renders memories susceptible to tampering. The manner in which a question is posed can alter or implant a memory. The multiple-choice style versus the open-ended style of questions are examples of this. The latter allows the witness to respond with "I don't know", whereas the former demands a response. Loftus has found that people unknowingly convince themselves of an answer when forced to give one. With numerous real-life examples, ranging from how we retain and retrieve memories to the differences in eyewitness ability, this book is vital to the understanding of forensic psychology.

In this three-volume series, Yochelson and Samenow examine the criminal personality. The series starts at the first encounter with the offender and continues through to the process of change. It includes the issue of drug use in this population. The authors have detailed their research with what they termed "the criminal mind". Their definition of the criminal strongly resembles the description of antisocial personality disorder and psychopathy. During the early stages of their research, Yochelson and Samenow limited their work to observation, without any attempt at treatment. They detailed 52 features of criminal thinking that needed to be changed for rehabilitation to be a possibility. Patterns of deception are established early in this population, and others' rights are characteristically disregarded. When arrested, members of this population tend to see themselves as victims and to believe that they are good people despite their lengthy criminal records. Over time, a treatment plan, or "process of change", was defined, holding that change was most likely to occur in this population when the individual was vulnerable and desirous of change. The desire for change must be accompanied by an in-depth knowledge of what needs to be changed. Finally, change is only possible when the long-term benefits of change outweigh the benefits of maintaining a criminal lifestyle. Overall, change is considered a possibility, although not a common one. These three volumes comprise the most detailed, long-term examination of the criminal mind documented.

Linguists have testified in legal cases implicating a wide range of linguistic levels, e.g., phonetics, phonology, morphology, syntax, semantics, pragmatics, and variations. Legal issues have included the following: statutory and contract language ambiguity; comprehensibility of jury instructions; problems with verbatim transcripts; spoken language as evidence of intent; adequacy of warning labels on consumer products; verbal offences (libel, slander); compliance with plain-language requirements; trademark and copyright infringement; informed consent; and the regulation of advertising language by the Federal Trade Commission in the US. The best-known and most experienced forensic linguist in North America is Roger Shuy, whose name was for a number of years synonymous with forensic linguistics in the role of trial consultant or expert.

As with the most recent discovery of mirror neurons has demonstrated Foucault has (while these techniques used in Psychiatry and Psychology are not mentioned alongside Foucault's name) hit on something that rigorous research methods may prove beyond a reasonable doubt that manipulation of social phenomena(which includes the human body and the mind) is most certainly possible. Techniques developed from the First and Second World war which started out as field experiments, among military personnel, were then extended into ordinary civilian life; techniques borrowed from the Human cognitive sciences and found its way into psychoanalysis, psychiatry, psychology, clinical psychology, Lightner Witmer and clinical psychiatry (see this encyclopedia's article on Political abuse of psychiatry): "Mobilisation and manipulation of human needs as they exist in the consumer". He (Ernest Dichter) "was the first to coin the term focus group and to stress the importance of image and persuasion in advertising". In Vance Packard's book The Hidden Persuaders, Dichter is mentioned extensively. Subjectivation, a term Foucault coined for this purpose in which Biological life itself is given over to constant testing and research(an examination) without ever ending. One could argue; who are these new experts answerable to? Foucault argues that these new experts are answerable to absolutely no one. Just like previous notions of the past, absolute monarchy and divine rights of kings were answerable to nobody, their predecessors are just replacements of the past these new experts have now been democratised. Where mans body (and his soul) his mind can be manipulated and altered and is liable to be vulnerable. Every single aspect of the human subject is ripe for "subjectification" and the technology-as it stands today-is unknown to us. This biological allegory of man carries with it endless possibilities from the perspective of the biological sciences and physical sciences. The above extractions clearly show this "biopower" of man requires man himself to administer these sophisticated technologies, where one group of experts or professionals(the enquiry) can completely subjugate another producing new human subjects(and new experts) through their expertise at manipulating social phenomena. In these few examples and according to this view: "the criminal is treated like a cancer", whereas human nature does not change which is the only society that ever gets produced, past, present or future.

== See also ==
- Foucault's lectures at the Collège de France
