= Bernard Harcourt =

American academic

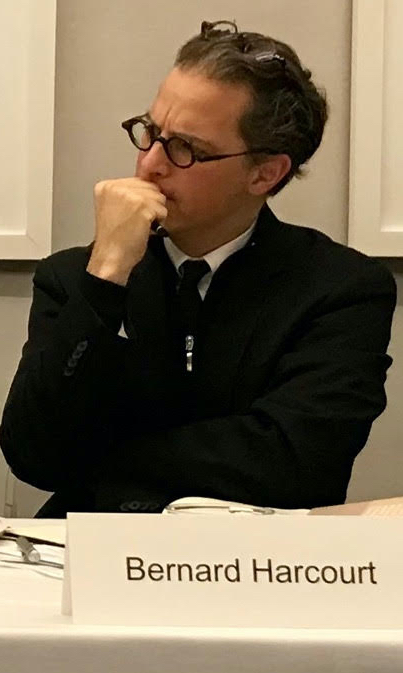
- Born: January 28, 1963 (age 63); New York City, New York
- Education: Princeton University (BA); Harvard University (JD, PhD)
- Occupations: Professor; lawyer
- Employer(s): Columbia University Law School; École des hautes études en sciences sociales
- Website: www.bernardharcourt.com

Bernard E. Harcourt (born 1963) is an American critical theorist with a specialization in the area of punishment, surveillance, legal and political theory, and political economy. He also does pro-bono legal work on human rights issues.

He is a professor at Columbia University Law School in New York City and at the École des hautes études en sciences sociales (EHESS) in Paris.

== Education ==
Harcourt was raised in New York City and attended the Lycée Français de New York. He earned a B.A. degree in political theory from Princeton University in 1984, a J.D. degree from Harvard Law School in 1989, and a Ph.D. in political science from Harvard in 2000.

== Career ==
As a lawyer, Harcourt has represented inmates on death row and those serving life imprisonment without parole. His most notable clients include Walter McMillian, and Doyle Lee Hamm, whose 2018 execution was called off because an IV line could not be set.

Harcourt is also an academic. He was appointed the Julius Kreeger Professor of Law and Criminology at the University of Chicago Law School in 2003 and elected chairman of the Department of Political Science in 2010. In 2013, he became a chaired professor at the École des hautes études en sciences sociales in Paris. Since 2014, he has been the Isidor and Seville Sulzbacher Professor of Law and Director of the Columbia Center for Contemporary Critical Thought at Columbia University.

== Works ==
Harcourt's writings focus on punishment, social control, legal and political theory, and political economy from a critical, empirical, and social theoretic perspective.

In 2012, he published, The Illusion of Free Markets: Punishment and the Myth of Natural Order which explored the relationship between laissez faire and mass incarceration.

In Illusion of Order: The False Promise of Broken Windows Policing he challenged evidence for the broken windows theory and critiqued the assumptions of the policing strategy. In Language of the Gun, he develops a post-structuralist theory of social science, arguing that social scientists should embrace the ethical choices they make when they interpret data.

He has also edited works by Michel Foucault in French and English. He is the editor of the French edition of Foucault's 1972 Collège de France lectures on Théories et institutions pénales (published by Gallimard in 2015) and Foucault's 1973 Collège de France lectures on La société punitive (published by Gallimard in 2013). He is the co-editor, with Fabienne Brion, of Foucault's 1981 Louvain lectures Mal faire, dire vrai. Fonction de l'aveu en justice.

In 2016, he published Exposed: Desire and Disobedience in the Digital Age, which explores how digital practices have transformed the circulation of power in contemporary society and produced what he refers to as a new "expository society". Exposed was translated into French as La Société d'exposition and reviewed in Le Monde and Le Figaro.

In 2018, he published The Counterrevolution: How Our Government Went to War Against Its Own Citizens.

In 2020, he published Critique and Praxis, in which he analyzes the history of critical theory, and argues that theory and critical praxis "should inform one another uninterruptedly."

In 2026, les Editions de la Maison des Sciences de l'Homme published Le Coopérisme, Une histoire politique, économique et sociale.

== Awards and honors ==
In 2015, Harcourt was awarded an honorary doctorate from the Aix-Marseille University in France for his contributions to contemporary critical thought.

He is also the recipient of the 2009 Gordon J. Laing Prize for his 2007 book, Against Prediction: Profiling, Policing and Punishing in the Actuarial Age.

In 2019, Harcourt received from the New York City Bar Association the Norman J. Redlich Capital Defense Distinguished Service Award for his longtime advocacy on behalf of individuals on death row.

== Bibliography ==
- (2001) Illusion of Order: The False Promise of Broken Windows Policing
- (2006) Language of the Gun: Youth, Crime, and Public Policy
- (2007) Against Prediction: Profiling, Policing and Punishing in an Actuarial Age
- (2011) The Illusion of Free Markets: Punishment and the Myth of Natural Order
- (2013) Occupy: Three Inquiries in Disobedience
- (2015) Exposed: Desire and Disobedience in the Digital Age
- (2018) The Counterrevolution: How Our Government Went to War Against Its Own Citizens
- (2020) Critique & Praxis: A Critical Philosophy of Illusions, Values, and Action
- (2023) Cooperation: A Political, Economic, and Social Theory

== Notes ==
Select publications

h. Harcourt, Bernard E (2018). The counterrevolution: how our government went to war against its own citizens. Basic Books. ISBN 9781541697287. OCLC 986976453.

i. Wrong-Doing, Truth-Telling: The Function of Avowal in Justice. University of Chicago Press. 2014. ISBN 9780226257709. OCLC 905163601.
j. Guns, crime, and punishment in America. New York Univ. Press. 2003. ISBN 978-0814736555. OCLC 845548019.
k. 2005/2014 – Carceral Notebooks (editor), Vol. 1–10. in Law Enforcement Ethics: Classic and Contemporary Issues. Ed Brian D. Fitch. SAGE Publications, 2013 ISBN 9781483312538
