= Therapeutic governance =

The term therapeutic governance is used in the social science literature to refer to two interrelated concepts. Therapeutic governance was coined by Vannessa Pupavac to describe the management of the populations' psychology, and its significance for security.

Allison McKim used the term therapeutic governance to describe the governmentality of alcohol and drug treatment, whereby treatment works as a type of responsibilizing governance in producing and managing a rational, self-interested subject.
