= Power-knowledge =

Concept in social philosophy

In critical theory, power-knowledge is a term introduced by the French philosopher Michel Foucault (French: le savoir-pouvoir). According to Foucault's understanding, power is based on knowledge and makes use of knowledge; on the other hand, power reproduces knowledge by shaping it in accordance with its anonymous intentions. Power creates and recreates its own fields of exercise through knowledge.

The relationship between power and knowledge has always been a central theme in the social sciences.

== Foucault's conception ==
Foucault, an epistemological constructivist and historicist, was critical of the idea that humans can reach "absolute" knowledge about the world. A fundamental goal in many of Foucault's works is to show how that which has traditionally been considered as absolute, universal and true is in fact historically contingent. To Foucault, even the idea of absolute knowledge is a historically contingent idea. This does not, however, lead to epistemological nihilism; rather, Foucault argues that people "always begin anew" when it comes to knowledge.

Foucault incorporated mutuality into his neologism power-knowledge, the most important part of which is the hyphen that links the two aspects of the integrated concept together (and alludes to their inherent inextricability).

In his later works Foucault suggests that power-knowledge was later replaced in the modern world with the term governmentality, which points to a specific mentality of governance.

== Subsequent developments ==
While in most of the 20th century the term 'knowledge' has been closely associated with power, in the last decades 'information' has become a central term as well. With the growing use of big data, information is increasingly seen as the means to generate useful knowledge and power.

A model described in 2019, referred to as the volume and control model, describes how information is capitalized by global corporations and transforms into economic power. Volume is defined as the informational resources—the amount and diversity of information and the people producing it. Control is the ability to channel the interaction between information and people through two competing mechanisms: popularization (information relevant to most people), and personalization (information relevant to each individual person).

According to this understanding, knowledge is never neutral, as it determines force relations. The notion of power-knowledge is therefore likely to be employed in critical, normative contexts. One example of the implications of power-knowledge is Google's monopoly of knowledge, its PageRank algorithm, and its inevitable commercial and cultural biases around the world, which are based on the volume and control principles. A 2019 study shows, for example, the commercial implications of Google Images algorithm, as all search results for the term 'beauty' in different languages predominantly yield images of young white women.

== See also ==
- Discourse
- Discourse analysis
- Critical discourse analysis
- Foucauldian discourse analysis
- Knowledge is power
