= Biopower =

Concept in the postmodern theory of social control

Biopower (or biopouvoir in French), coined by French social theorist Michel Foucault, refers to various means by which modern nation states control their populations. In Foucault's work, it has been used to refer to practices of public health, regulation of heredity, and risk regulation, among many other regulatory mechanisms often linked less directly with literal physical health. Foucault first used the term in his lecture courses at the Collège de France, and the term first appeared in print in The Will to Knowledge, Foucault's first volume of The History of Sexuality. It is closely related to a term he uses much less frequently, but which subsequent thinkers have taken up independently, biopolitics, which aligns more closely with the examination of the strategies and mechanisms through which human life processes are managed under regimes of authority over knowledge, power, and the processes of subjectivation.

== Foucault's conception ==
For Foucault, biopower is a technology of power for managing humans in large groups; the distinctive quality of this political technology is that it allows for the control of entire populations. It refers to the control of human bodies through an anatomo-politics of the human body and biopolitics of the population through societal disciplinary institutions. Modern power, according to Foucault's analysis, becomes encoded into social practices as well as human behavior, as the human subject gradually acquiesces to subtle regulations and expectations of the social order. It is an integral feature and essential to the workings of—and makes possible the emergence of—the modern nation state, capitalism, etc. Biopower is literally having power over bodies; it is "an explosion of numerous and diverse techniques for achieving the subjugation of bodies and the control of populations". Foucault elaborates further in his lecture courses on biopower entitled Security, Territory, Population delivered at the Collège de France between January and April 1978:

By this I mean a number of phenomena that seem to me to be quite significant, namely, the set of mechanisms through which the basic biological features of the human species became the object of a political strategy, of a general strategy of power, or, in other words, how, starting from the 18th century, modern Western societies took on board the fundamental biological fact that human beings are a species. This is what I have called biopower.

It relates to governmental concerns of fostering the life of the population, "an anatomo-politics of the human body a global mass that is affected by overall characteristics specific to life, like birth, death, production, illness, and so on. It produces a generalized disciplinary society and regulatory controls through biopolitics of the population". In his lecture Society Must Be Defended, Foucault examines biopolitical state racism, and its accomplished rationale of myth-making and narrative. Mark Kelly explains the fundamental difference between biopolitics and discipline:

Where discipline is the technology deployed to make individuals behave, to be efficient and productive workers, biopolitics is deployed to manage population; for example, to ensure a healthy workforce.

Foucault argues that the previous Greco-Roman, medieval rule of the Roman emperor, the Divine right of kings, Absolute monarchy and the popes model of power and social control over the body was an individualising mode based on a singular individual, primarily the king, Holy Roman emperor, pope and Roman emperor. However, after the emergence of the medieval metaphor body politic which meant society as a whole with the ruler, in this case the king, as the head of society with the so-called Estates of the realm and the medieval Roman Catholic Church next to the monarch with the majority of the peasant population or feudal serfs at the bottom of the hierarchical pyramid. This meaning of the metaphor was then codified into medieval law for the offense of high treason and if found guilty the sentence of Hanged, drawn and quartered was carried out. However, this was drastically altered in 18th century Europe with the advent and realignment of modern political power as opposed to the ancient world and medieval version of political power. The mass democracy of the Liberal western world and the voting franchise was added to the mass population; liberal democracy and Political parties; universal adult suffrage-exclusively male at this time, then extended to women in Europe from 1906 (Finland) - 1971 (Switzerland, see Women's suffrage in Switzerland), and extending to people of African descent in America with the abolition of the infamous Jim Crow laws in 1964 (see Civil Rights Act of 1964 and Voting Rights Act of 1965).

The emergence of the human sciences and its subsequent direction, during the 16th and 18th centuries, primarily aimed at the modern Western man and the society he inhabits, aided the development of Disciplinary institution and furthermore, Foucault cites the human sciences, particularly the medical sciences, led to the advent of anatomo-politics of the human body, a biopolitics and bio-history of man. A transition occurred through forcible removal of various European monarchs into a "scientific" state apparatus and the radical overhaul of judiciary practices coupled with the reinvention and division of those who were to be punished.

A second mode for seizure of power was developed as a type of power that was stochastic and "massifying" rather than "individualizing". By "massifying" Foucault means transforming into a population ("population state"), with an extra added impetus of a governing mechanism in the form of a scientific machinery and apparatus. This scientific mechanism which we now know as the State "governs less" of the population and concentrates more on administrating external devices. Foucault then reminds us that this anatomo-biopolitics of the body (and human life) and the population correlates with the new founded knowledge of sciences and the 'new' politics of modern society, masquerading as liberal democracy, where life (biological life) itself became not only a deliberate political strategy but an economic, political and scientific problem, both for the mathematical sciences and the biological sciences–coupled together with the nation state.

And I think that one of the greatest transformations political right underwent in the 19th century was precisely that, I wouldn't say exactly that sovereignty's old right—to take life or let live—was replaced, but it came to be complemented by a new right which does not erase the old right but which does penetrate it, permeate it. To say that power took possession of life in the nineteenth century, or to say that power at least takes life under its care in the nineteenth century, is to say that it has, thanks to the play of technologies of discipline on the one hand and technologies of regulation on the other, succeeded in covering the whole surface that lies between the organic and the biological, between body and population. We are, then, in a power that has taken control of both the body and life or that has, if you like, taken control of life in general – with the body as one pole and the population as the other. What we are dealing with in this new technology of power is not exactly society (or at least not the social body, as defined by the jurists), nor is it the individual body. It is a new body, a multiple body, a body with so many heads that, while they might not be infinite in number, cannot necessarily be counted. Biopolitics deals with the population, with the population as a political problem, as a problem that is at once scientific and political, as a biological problem and as power’s problem I would like in fact like to trace the transformation not at the level of political theory, but rather at the level of the mechanisms, techniques, and technologies of power. We saw the emergence of techniques of power that were essentially centered on the body, on the individual body. They included all devices that were used to ensure the spatial distribution of individuals bodies (their separation, their alignment, their serialization, and their surveillance)and the organization, around those individuals, of a whole field of visibility. They were also techniques that could be used to take control over bodies. Attempts were made to increase their productive force through exercise, drill, and so on. They were also techniques for rationalizing and strictly economizing on a power that had to be used in the least costly way possible, thanks to whole system of surveillance, hierarchies, inspections, book-keeping, and reports—all the technology of labor. It was established at the end of the seventeenth century, and in the course of the eighteenth century.

Foucault argues that nation states, police, government, legal practices, human sciences and medical institutions have their own rationale, cause and effects, strategies, technologies, mechanisms and codes and have managed successfully in the past to obscure their workings by hiding behind observation and scrutiny. Foucault insists social institutions such as governments, laws, religion, politics, social administration, monetary institutions, military institutions cannot have the same rigorous practices and procedure with claims to independent knowledge like those of the human and 'hard' sciences, such as mathematics, chemistry, astronomy, physics, genetics, and biology. Foucault sees these differences in techniques as nothing more than "behaviour control technologies", and modern biopower as nothing more than a series of webs and networks working its way around the societal body.

However, Foucault argues the exercise of power in the service of maximizing life carries a dark underside. When the state is invested in protecting the life of the population, when the stakes are life itself, anything can be justified. Groups identified as the threat to the existence of the life of the nation or of humanity can be eradicated with impunity.

If genocide is indeed the dream of modern power, this is not because of the recent return to the ancient right to kill; it is because power is situated and exercised at the level of life, the species, the race, and the large-scale phenomena of the population.

== Milieu intérieur ==
Foucault concentrates his attention on what he calls the major political and social project, namely the milieu, or the environment within. Foucault takes as his starting point the 16th century, continuing to the 18th century, with the milieu culminating into the founding disciplines of science, mathematics, political economy and statistics. Foucault makes an explicit point on the value of secrecy of government (arcana imperii, from the Latin which means secrecy of power, secrets of the empire, which goes back to the time of the Roman Empire in the age of Tacitus) coined by Jean Bodin and was incorporated into a politics of truth. Foucault insists, in referring to the term 'public opinion' ('politics of truth'), that the concept of truth refers to the term 'regimes of truth'. He mentions a group called The Ideologues where the term ideology first appears and is taken from. Foucault argues that it is through 'regimes of truth' that raison d'état achieves its political and biological success. Here the modern version of government is presented to the population in the national media—in the electronic media television and radio, and especially in the written press—as the modicum of efficiency, fiscal optimisation, political responsibility, and fiscal rigorousness. Thus, a public discourse of government solidarity emerges and social consensus is emphasised through these four points. This impression of joint solidarity is continuously reproduced through inherited political rationality, in turn giving the machine (Foucault uses the term dispositif) of the State not only legitimacy but an air of invincibility from its main primary sources: reason, truth, freedom, and human existence. Foucault traces the first dynamics, the first historical dimensions, as belonging to the early Middle Ages.

One major thinker whose work forms a parallel with Foucault's own is the medieval historian Ernst Kantorowicz. Kantorowicz mentions a medieval device known as the body politic (the king's two bodies). This medieval device was so well received by legal theorists and lawyers of the day that it was incorporated and codified into medieval society and institutions (Kantorowicz mentions the term corporation which would later become known to us as capitalism, an economic category). Kantorowicz also refers to the Glossators who belonged to a well-known branch of legal schools in medieval Europe, experts in jurisprudence and law science, appeal of treason, The Lords Appellant and the commentaries of jurist Edmund Plowden and his Plowden Reports. In Kantorowicz' analysis, a medieval political theology emerged throughout the Middle Ages which provided the modern basis for the democratisation of the hereditary succession of a wealthy elite and for our own modern political hierarchical order (politicians) and their close association with the wealthy nobility. Primarily, this is the democratisation of sovereignty, which is known in modern political terms as "liberal democracy". Kantorowicz argues a medieval triumvirate appears (with the support of the legal machine), a private enterprise of wealth and succession both supporting the fixed hierarchical order reserved exclusively for the nobility and their descendants, and the monarch and her/his heirs. Co-operation was needed by the three groups—the Monarchy, the Church, and the nobility—in an uneasy medieval alliance and, at times, it appeared fractious.

What is the reasoning behind the whole population subservience with the worshiping of state emblems, symbols and related mechanisms with their associates who represent the institutional mechanism (democratization of sovereignty); where fierce loyalty from the population is presented, in modern times as universal admiration for the president, the monarch, the Pope and the prime minister? Foucault would argue that while all the cost benefits were met by the newly founded urban population in the form of production and political power, it is precisely this type of behaviour which enables social cohesion, and supports the raison dêtre of the nation state as well as its capacity to "govern less."

Foucault makes special note on the biological "naturalness" of the human species and the new founded scientific interest that was developing around not only with the species interaction with milieu and technology, but most importantly, technology operating as system not as so often portrayed by the political and social sciences which insisted on technology operating as social improvement. Both milieu, natural sciences and technology, allied with the characteristics surrounding social organization and increasingly the categorization of the sciences to help deal with this "naturalness" of milieu and of the inscription of truth onto nature. Due to Foucault's discussions with Georges Canguilhem, Foucault notices that not only was milieu now a newly discovered scientific biological naturalness ever-present in Lamarckian Biology the notion (biological naturalness) was actually invented and imported from Newtonian mechanics (Classical mechanics) via Georges-Louis Leclerc, Comte de Buffon due to Buffon mentorship and friendship with Jean-Baptiste Lamarck and used by Biology in the middle of the 18th century borrowing from Newton the explanatory model of an organic reaction through the action of "milieu Newtonian" physics used by Isaac Newton and the Newtonians. Humans (the species being mentioned in Marx) were now both the object of this newly discovered scientific and "natural" truth and new categorization, but subjected to it allied by laws, both scientific and natural law (scientific jurisprudence), the state's mode of governmental rationality to the will of its population. But, most importantly, interaction with the social environment and social interactions with others and the modern nation state's interest in the populations well-being and the destructive capability that the state possess in its armoury and it was with the group who called themselves the économistes (Vincent de Gournay, François Quesnay, François Véron Duverger de Forbonnais, and Anne-Robert-Jacques Turgot) who continued with the rationalization of this "naturalness". Foucault notices that this "naturalness" continues and is extended further with the advent of 18th century political society with the new founded implement "population" and their (political population) association with raison d'état.

=== Statistics and medical sciences in biopower ===
Statistics and medical sciences play an essential role in the development of biopower, as they enable authorities to understand the biological characteristics of the population and adapt their interventions accordingly. Census data, birth and death rates, epidemiological statistics, and health indicators help identify health risks and implement preventive policies. Thus, medicine and statistics do not merely serve to improve individual health; they also contribute to the management and regulation of the population. As Andrea Rusnock explains in her study on biopolitics and the construction of the concept of population, the development of quantification has notably contributed to measuring infant and maternal mortality and strengthening public health practices. Scientific knowledge therefore becomes an instrument of government, enabling intervention in collective biological phenomena.

==== Biopolitics ====
Detailed article: Biopolitics.

Biopower, in its political form, is first exercised by considering human beings as living species, and then by taking into account their living environment and conditions of existence. For example, plague epidemics were linked to problems associated with marshlands, leading to the implementation of a comprehensive public hygiene policy.

The effects of cities on birth rates, mortality rates, and the ageing of the population were analyzed. With industrialization, old age, workplace accidents, and war-related disabilities raised the issue of individuals who became unable to work. Insurance and savings mechanisms were developed to address this problem. Collective savings and insurance funds, medical institutions, relief funds, and health insurance schemes were established.

Industrialization and public medicine triggered a genuine demographic explosion. Consequently, mechanisms aimed at regulating population movements developed, including statistical mechanisms.

Some academic studies follow in the footsteps of Michel Foucault's work and examine the relationship between biopower and the emergence and political management of HIV/AIDS. Researcher Florence Lhote argues that the “AIDS event” of the 1990s brought about a crisis of biopower, as discussed in her article “Genre et genres : le VIH par ses récits” (“Gender and Genres: HIV Through Its Narratives”).

== See also ==
- Biopolitics
- Foucault's lectures at the Collège de France
- Governmentality
- Necropolitics

== Sources ==
- Michel Foucault, Society Must Be Defended
- Michel Foucault, Security, Territory, Population
- Giorgio Agamben, Homo Sacer
- Michael Hardt and Antonio Negri, Empire
- Michael Hardt and Antonio Negri, Multitude
