= Wrong-Doing, Truth-Telling =

Printed text of Foucault's 1981 lectures

Wrong-Doing, Truth-Telling: The Function of Avowal in Justice
- 2014 Book cover
- Author: Michel Foucault
- Translator: Stephen W. Sawyer
- Subject: Confession in Law, Philosophy
- Set in: Catholic University of Louvain
- Published: 2014
- Publisher: University of Chicago Press
- Publication place: United States, Great Britain
- Media type: Print, E-book
- Pages: 360
- ISBN: 9780226708904 9780226922089
- OCLC: 783150357
- Website: Official website

Wrong-Doing, Truth-Telling: The Function of Avowal in Justice is a printed text version of the series of lectures delivered at the Catholic University of Louvain by Michel Foucault from early April to late May 1981. This book was edited by Fabienne Brion and Bernard E. Harcourt, translated by Stephen W, Sawyer and was published in 2014 by the University of Chicago Press. This seminar series consists of seven published lectures which occurred over a period of six weeks. The lecture series is Michel Foucault's examination of the evolution of truth-telling, or more accurately, avowal, within various pertinent settings.

== Synopsis ==
In this set of lectures, Foucault presents how feeling obligated to tell the truth about yourself has changed throughout history. For scholars of law, society, and crime, these lectures provide a distinct historical perspective regarding the different methods used in legal settings to find important truths. These truths involve crimes, who committed them, and the moral implications. A major theme throughout these lectures is the constantly changing relationship between admitting guilt ("avowal") and achieving justice for both individuals and society.

Foucault starts with Pre-Socratic ancient Greece and follows how it's evolved over time. Then he examines "avowal" as applied to professional fields like medicine, law, and politics. But also truth-telling is applied to personal relationships. According to a reviewer of this work, Jonathan Ree:

"When I say 'I love you', for example, I am not offering you information about how I happen to feel, but making an avowal--a formulaic declaration which puts me in a position of dependence and binds me to a practice of truth-telling--and Foucault hoped he would be able to explain why."

Also, according to Foucault, for centuries, playwrights dealt with the relationship between justice and admitting the truth. In ancient Greece philosophers believed understanding yourself led to controlling yourself. Christianity's approach to avowal was a radical departure. It didn't rely on religious or philosophical instruction, but instead focused on understanding a person's sinful nature. For Christians, understanding themselves wasn't about becoming a self-sufficient hero. It was about humbly accepting their flaws and accepting a spiritual journey, which Foucault called "the hermeneutics of the self."

Public confessions for wrongdoings eventually changed to confidential confessions with a priest, but later returned to stricter practices within the medieval Church. Foucault then examines how legal truth functioned within the early modern state. This resulted in a 19th century popular attraction to criminal psychology. Hence, judges saw themselves as experts on the criminal mind rather than simply as interpreters of the law. Punishment wasn't just about the criminal act or the resultant penalty, but about forcing criminals to come to terms with their motives.

Foucault realized that the limited number of lectures were not enough to cover the material he wanted to cover. However, he was willing to propose the possibilities of these connections and insights for successors to research or look into.
