= Security, Territory, Population =

Book by Michel Foucault

Security, Territory, Population: Lectures at the Collège de France, 1977–1978
- Author: Michel Foucault
- Translator: Graham Burchell
- Language: French
- Published: St Martin's Press
- Publication date: 1977-1978
- Publication place: France
- Media type: Print (hardback & paperback)

Security, Territory, Population: Lectures at the Collège de France, 1977–1978 pertains to a lecture series given by French philosopher Michel Foucault at the Collège de France between 1977 and 1978 and published posthumously.

== Content ==
The course deals with the genesis of a political knowledge that was to place at the centre of its concerns the notion of population and the mechanisms capable of ensuring its regulation but even of its procedures and means employed to ensure, in a given society, "the government of men". A transition from a "territorial state" to a "population state" (Nation state)? Foucault examines the notion of biopolitics and biopower as a new technology of power over populations that is distinct from punitive disciplinary systems, by tracing the history of governmentality, from the first centuries of the Christian era to the emergence of the modern nation state. These lectures illustrate a radical turning point in Foucault's work at which a shift to the problematic of the government of self and others occurred.

Foucault's challenge to himself in these series of lectures is to try and decipher the genealogical split between power in ancient and medieval society and late modern society, such as our own. By split Foucault means power as a force for manipulation of the human body. Previous notions of power failed to account for the historical subject and general shifts in techniques of power-according to Foucault's genealogy or genesis of power – it was totally denied that manipulation of the human body by unforeseen, outside forces ever existed. According to this theory, it was human ingenuity and man's ability to increase his own rationalisation was the primary motion behind social phenomena and the human subject and change was a result of increasing human reason and human conscience ingenuity. Foucault denies that any such notion had ever existed in the historical record and insists that this kind of thought is a misleading abstraction. Foucault cites the main driving force behind this set of accelerated change was the modern human sciences and the technologies both available to skilled professionals from the 16th century and a whole set of clever techniques used to shift the whole old social order into the new order of things. However, what was significant was the notion of population practised upon the entire human species on a global mass scale, not in separately locally defined areas. By population, Foucault means its fluidness and malleability, Foucault refers to 'a multiplicity of men, not to the extent that they are nothing more than individual bodies, but to the extent that they form, on the contrary, a global mass that is affected by overall processes of birth, death, production, taxation, illness and so forth, one should also take note that Foucault does not just mean population as singular event but a means of circulation tied to factors of security. What again was also significant was the idea of "freedom" the population's "freedom" which was the new modern nation state and the 'neo-discourse' erected around such notions as freedom, work and liberalism, the ideological stance of the state (mass popular democracy and the voting franchise) and the state was only too willing to recognize and give freedom for example as the object of security. Population, in Foucault's understanding, is understood as a self-regulating mass;an agglomeration or circulation of people and things which co-operate and co-produce order free from heavy state regulation the state governs less allowing the population to "govern itself". For Foucault, the freedom of population is grasped at the level of how elements of population circulate. Techniques of security enact themselves through, and upon, the circulation which occurs at the level of population. In Foucault's opinion the modern concept of population, as opposed to the ancient antiquity and medieval version of "populousness" which has in its roots going as far back as the time period of the Book of Numbers in the Old Testament Bible and the work that it sustained both in political theory and practice certainly does so; or, at least, the construction of the concept population is central to the creation of new orders of knowledge, new objects of intervention, new forms of subjectivity.

However, in order to fully understand what Foucault is trying to convey a few things should be said about the alteration techniques used that Foucault talks about in this series of lectures. The ancient and medieval version of political power was centered around a central figure who was called a king, emperor, prince or ruler (and in some cases the pope) of his principle territory whose rule was considered absolute (absolute monarchy) by both political philosophy and political theory of the day even in our time such notions still exist. Foucault uses the term "population state" to designate a new founded technology founded on the principal of security and territory which would mean a "population" to govern on a global mass with each population having its own territorial integrity(a separate nation) mapped out by experts in treaty negotiations and the new emerging field of 15th century advances in map-making technologies and the profession of cartography eventually producing in the 18th century what we now know as nation states. These technologies take place at the level of "population" Foucault argues, and with the shifting aside of the body of the king or territorial ruler. By the time of the ending of the medieval period the body (or the persona of the king) of the territorial ruler became under increasingly under financial pressure and a cursory look at the medieval financial records tends to show that the monarch could not pay back all debts due to his creditors; the monarch would easily and readily default on loans due to any creditors causing financial ruin to creditors. Foucault notices that by the time of the 18th century several changes began to take place like the re-organization of armies, an emerging industrial working population begins to appear, (both military and industrial), the emergence of the mathematical sciences, biological sciences and physical sciences which, coincidently gave birth to what Foucault calls "biopower" and a political apparatus (machine) to take care of biological (in the form of medicine and health) and political life (mass democracy and the voting franchise for the population). An apparatus (both economic and political) was required much more sophisticated than previous social organisations of previous societies had at their disposal. For example, banks, which function as financial intermediaries and tied to the apparatus of the new 'state' machine which can easily pay back any large scale debts (large debts) which the king cannot, due to the king's own financial resources being limited; the king cannot pay back, for example, the national debt, nor pay for a modern army out of his own personal resources, which can amount to trillions of US Dollars out of his own personal finances, that would be both impracticable and impossible.

== See also ==
- Foucault's lectures at the Collège de France
