= Disciplinary institution =

Concept proposed by Michel Foucault

Disciplinary institutions (French: institution disciplinaire) is a concept proposed by Michel Foucault in Discipline and Punish (1975). School, prison, barracks, or the hospital (especially psychiatric hospitals) are examples of historical disciplinary institutions, all created in their modern form in the 19th century with the Industrial Revolution. Discipline "cannot be identified with any one institution or apparatus," Deleuze explains, "precisely because it is a type of power, a technology, that traverses every kind of apparatus or institution, linking them, prolonging them, and making them converge and function in a new way."

This concept may be related to the concept of "total institution" proposed by Erving Goffman in 1961, as well as to Louis Althusser's Ideological State Apparatuses (ISA).

== See also ==
- Governmentality

== Sources ==
- Deleuze, Gilles. 1986. Foucault. Trans. Sean Hand. London: Athlone, 1988. ISBN 0-8264-5780-0.
- Foucault, Michel. 1975. Discipline and Punish: The Birth of the Prison. Trans. Alan Sheridan. London: Penguin, 1991. ISBN 0-14-013722-X.
