= François Véron Duverger de Forbonnais =

French political economist (1722–1800)

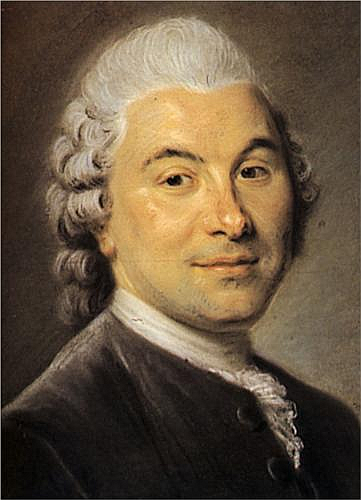
Portrait of François Véron Duverger de Forbonnais painted by Maurice Quentin de La Tour

François Véron Duverger de Forbonnais (3 October 1722 – 19 September 1800) was a French political economist and contributor to the Encyclopédie ou Dictionnaire raisonné des sciences, des arts et des métiers.

== Life ==
François Véron Duverger de Forbonnais was born in Le Mans and educated in Paris. After working for his father's textile business, he settled in Paris and became inspector-general of the French coinage in 1752.

He edited the Journal de l'agriculture, du commerce et des finances in the 1760s, and would help draw up Le Mans' Cahiers de doléances in 1789.

He died in Paris.

== Works ==
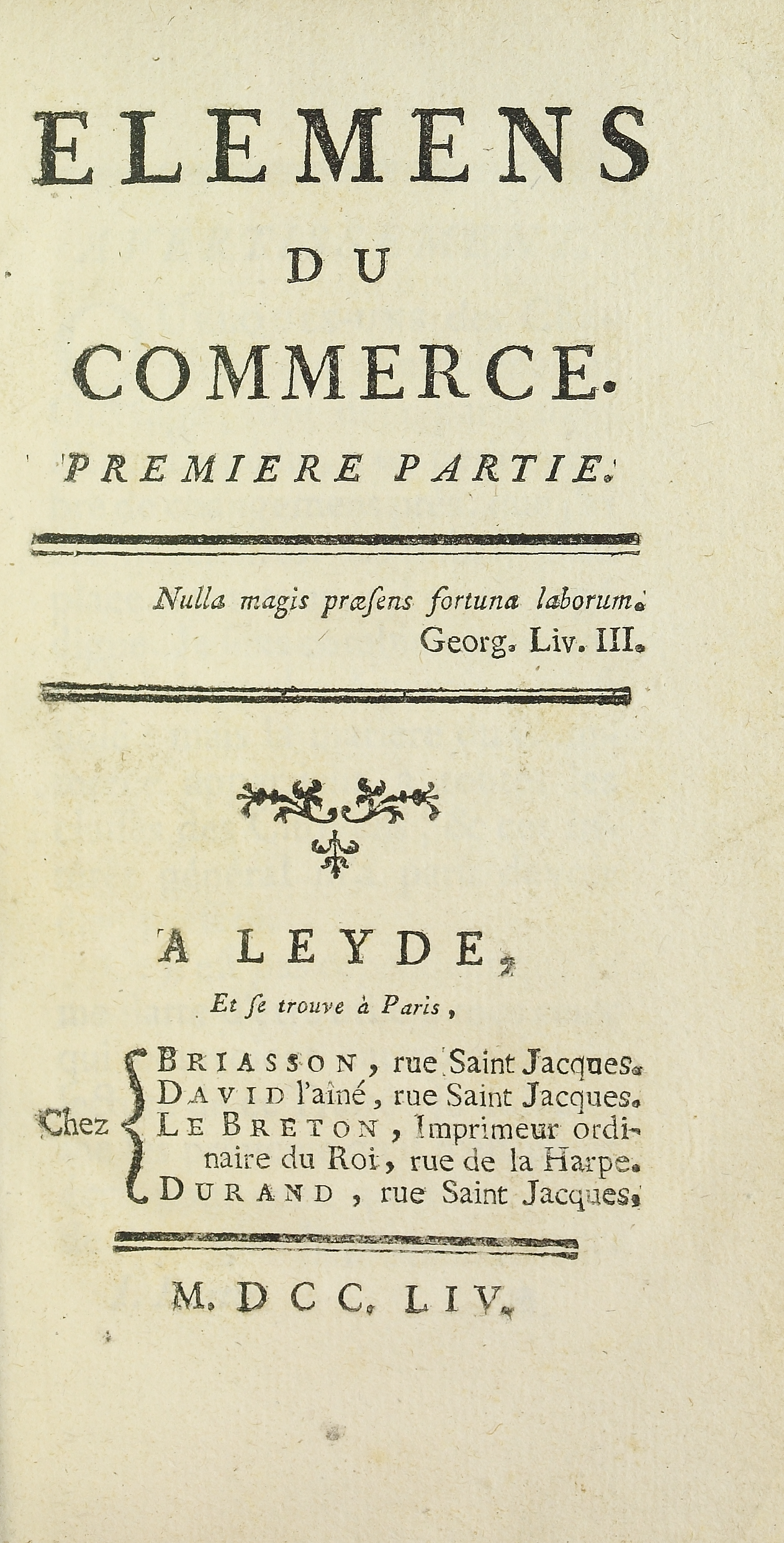
Elemens du commerce, 1754

- Considérations sur les finances d'Espagne, 1753
- Elémens du commerce, 1754
- Questions sur le commerce des françois au Levant, 1755
- Essai sur l'admission des navires neutres dans nos colonies, 1756
- Recherches et considérations sur les finances de France depuis 1595 jusqu'en 1721, 1758
- Principes et observations oeconomiques, 1767
