= Discipline and Punish =

1975 book by Michel Foucault

- Cover of the French edition
- Author: Michel Foucault
- Original title: Surveiller et punir – Naissance de la prison
- Translator: Alan Sheridan
- Language: French
- Subjects: Prisons; Prison discipline Punishment
- Published: 1975 (Gallimard, in French); 1977 (Pantheon Books, in English)
- Publication place: France
- Media type: Print (Hardback & Paperback)
- Pages: 318
- ISBN: 0-394-49942-5 (First English edition)
- OCLC: 3328401
- Dewey Decimal: 365
- LC Class: HV8666 .F6813 1977

Discipline and Punish: The Birth of the Prison (French: Surveiller et punir – Naissance de la prison) is a 1975 book by French philosopher Michel Foucault. It is an analysis of the social and theoretical mechanisms behind the changes that occurred in Western penal systems during the modern age based on historical documents from France. Foucault argues that prison did not become the principal form of punishment just because of the humanitarian concerns of reformists. He traces the cultural shifts that led to the predominance of prison via the body and power. Prison is used by the "disciplines" – new technological powers that can also be found, according to Foucault, in places such as schools, hospitals, and military barracks.

== Summary ==
The main ideas of Discipline and Punish can be grouped according to its four parts: torture, punishment, discipline, and prison.

=== Torture ===
Foucault begins by contrasting two forms of penalty: the violent and chaotic public torture of Robert-François Damiens, who was convicted of attempted regicide in the mid-18th century, and the highly regimented daily schedule for inmates from an early 19th-century prison (Mettray). These examples provide a picture of just how profound the changes in Western penal systems were after less than a century. Foucault wants the reader to consider what led to these changes and how Western attitudes shifted so radically.

He believes that the question of the nature of these changes is best asked by assuming that they were not used to create a more humanitarian penal system, nor to more exactly punish or rehabilitate, but as part of a continuing trajectory of subjection. Foucault wants to tie scientific knowledge and technological development to the development of the prison to prove this point. He defines a "micro-physics" of power, which is constituted by a power that is strategic and tactical rather than acquired, preserved or possessed. He explains that power and knowledge imply one another, as opposed to the common belief that knowledge exists independently of power relations (knowledge is always contextualized in a framework that makes it intelligible, so the humanizing discourse of psychiatry is an expression of the tactics of oppression). That is, the ground of the game of power is not won by "liberation", because liberation already exists as a facet of subjection. "The man described for us, whom we are invited to free, is already in himself the effect of a subjection much more profound than himself."

The problem for Foucault is in some sense a theoretical modelling that posits a soul, an identity (the use of soul being fortunate since "identity" or "name" would not properly express the method of subjection—e.g., if mere materiality were used as a way of tracking individuals then the method of punishment would not have switched from torture to psychiatry) which allows a whole materiality of prison to develop. In "What is an Author?" Foucault also deals with notion of identity, and its use as a method of control, regulation, and tracking.

He begins by examining public torture and execution. He argues that the public spectacle of torture and execution was a theatrical forum, the original intentions of which eventually produced several unintended consequences. Foucault stresses the exactitude with which torture is carried out, and describes an extensive legal framework in which it operates to achieve specific purposes. Foucault describes public torture as a ceremony.

The intended purposes were:

- To make the secret public (according to Foucault, the investigation was kept entirely secret even from the accused). The secret of the investigation and the conclusion of the magistrates was justified by the publicity of the torture.
- To show the effect of investigation on confession. (According to Foucault, torture could occur during the investigation, because partial proofs meant partial guilt. If the torture failed to elicit a confession then the investigation was stopped and innocence assumed. A confession legitimized the investigation and any torture that occurred.)
- Reflecting the violence of the original crime onto the convict's body for all to see, in order for it to be manifested then annulled by reciprocating the violence of the crime on the criminal.
- Enacting the revenge upon the convict's body, which the monarch seeks for having been injured by the crime. Foucault argues that the law was considered an extension of the sovereign's body, and so the revenge must take the form of harming the convict's body.

"It [torture] assured the articulation of the written on the oral, the secret on the public, the procedure of investigation on the operation of the confession; it made it possible to reproduce the crime on the visible body of the criminal; in the same horror, the crime had to be manifested and annulled. It also made the body of the condemned man the place where the vengeance of the sovereign was applied, the anchoring point for a manifestation of power, an opportunity of affirming the dissymmetry of forces."

Foucault looks at public torture as the outcome "of a certain mechanism of power" that views crime in a military schema. Crime and rebellion are akin to a declaration of war. The sovereign was not concerned with demonstrating the ground for the enforcement of its laws, but of identifying enemies and attacking them, the power of which was renewed by the ritual of investigation and the ceremony of public torture.

Some unintended consequences were:

- Providing a forum for the convict's body to become a focus of sympathy and admiration.
- Redistributing blame: the executioner rather than the convict becomes the locus of shame.
- Creating a site of conflict between the masses and the sovereign at the convict's body. Foucault notes that public executions often led to riots in support of the prisoner. Frustration for the inefficiency of this economy of power could be directed towards and coalesce around the site of torture and execution.

Public torture and execution was a method the sovereign deployed to express his or her power, and it did so through the ritual of investigation and the ceremony of execution—the reality and horror of which was supposed to express the omnipotence of the sovereign but actually revealed that the sovereign's power depended on the participation of the people. Torture was made public in order to create fear in the people, and to force them to participate in the method of control by agreeing with its verdicts. But problems arose in cases in which the people through their actions disagreed with the sovereign, by heroicizing the victim (admiring the courage in facing death) or in moving to physically free the criminal or to redistribute the effects of the strategically deployed power. Thus, he argues, the public execution was ultimately an ineffective use of the body, qualified as non-economical. As well, it was applied non-uniformly and haphazardly. Hence, its political cost was too high. It was the antithesis of the more modern concerns of the state: order and generalization. So it had to be reformed to allow for greater stability of property for the bourgeoisie.

=== Punishment ===
Firstly, the switch to prison was not immediate and sudden. There was a more graded change, though it ran its course rapidly. Prison was preceded by a different form of public spectacle. The theater of public torture gave way to public chain gangs. Punishment became "gentle", though not for humanitarian reasons, Foucault suggests. He argues that reformists were unhappy with the unpredictable, unevenly distributed nature of the violence the sovereign would inflict on the convict. The sovereign's right to punish was so disproportionate that it was ineffective and uncontrolled. Reformists felt the power to punish and judge should become more evenly distributed, the state's power must be a form of public power. This, according to Foucault, was of more concern to reformists than humanitarian arguments.

Out of this movement towards generalized punishment, a thousand "mini-theatres" of punishment would have been created wherein the convicts' bodies would have been put on display in a more ubiquitous, controlled, and effective spectacle. Prisoners would have been forced to do work that reflected their crime, thus repaying society for their infractions. This would have allowed the public to see the convicts' bodies enacting their punishment, and thus to reflect on the crime. But these experiments lasted less than twenty years.

Foucault argues that this theory of "gentle" punishment represented the first step away from the excessive force of the sovereign, and towards more generalized and controlled means of punishment. But he suggests that the shift towards prison that followed was the result of a new "technology" and ontology for the body being developed in the 18th century, the "technology" of discipline, and the ontology of "man as machine."

=== Discipline ===
According to Foucault, the emergence of prison as the form of punishment for every crime grew out of the development of discipline in the 18th and 19th centuries. He looks at the development of highly refined forms of discipline, of discipline concerned with the smallest and most precise aspects of a person's body. Discipline, he suggests, developed a new economy and politics for bodies. Modern institutions required that bodies must be individuated according to their tasks, as well as for training, observation, and control. Therefore, he argues, discipline created a whole new form of individuality for bodies, which enabled them to perform their duty within the new forms of economic, political, and military organizations emerging in the modern age and continuing to today.

The individuality that discipline constructs (for the bodies it controls) has four characteristics, namely it makes individuality that is:

- Cellular—determining the spatial distribution of the bodies
- Organic—ensuring that the activities required of the bodies are "natural" for them
- Genetic—controlling the evolution over time of the activities of the bodies
- Combinatory—allowing for the combination of the force of many bodies into a single massive force

Foucault suggests this individuality can be implemented in systems that are officially egalitarian, but use discipline to construct non-egalitarian power relations:

Historically, the process by which the bourgeoisie became in the course of the eighteenth century the politically dominant class was masked by the establishment of an explicit, coded and formally egalitarian juridical framework, made possible by the organization of a parliamentary, representative regime. But the development and generalization of disciplinary mechanisms [dispositifs disciplinaires] constituted the other, dark side of these processes. The general juridical form that guaranteed a system of rights that were egalitarian in principle was supported by these tiny, everyday, physical mechanisms, by all those systems of micro-power that are essentially non-egalitarian and asymmetrical that we call the disciplines.

Foucault's argument is that discipline creates "docile bodies", ideal for the new economics, politics and warfare of the modern industrial age – bodies that function in factories, ordered military regiments, and school classrooms. But, to construct docile bodies the disciplinary institutions must be able to constantly observe and record the bodies they control and ensure the internalization of the disciplinary individuality within the bodies being controlled. That is, discipline must come about without excessive force through careful observation, and molding of the bodies into the correct form through this observation. This requires a particular form of institution, exemplified, Foucault argues, by Jeremy Bentham's panopticon. This architectural model, though it was never adopted by architects according to Bentham's exact blueprint, becomes an important conceptualization of power relations for prison reformers of the 19th century, and its general principle is a recurring theme in modern prison construction.

The panopticon was the ultimate realization of a modern disciplinary institution. It allowed for constant observation characterized by an "unequal gaze"; the constant possibility of observation. Perhaps the most important feature of the panopticon was that it was specifically designed so that the prisoner could never be sure whether they were being observed at any moment. The unequal gaze caused the internalization of disciplinary individuality, and the docile body required of its inmates. This means one is less likely to break rules or laws if they believe they are being watched, even if they are not. Thus, prisons, and specifically those that follow the model of the panopticon, provide the ideal form of modern punishment. Foucault argues that this is why the generalized, "gentle" punishment of public work gangs gave way to the prison. It was the ideal modernization of punishment, so its eventual dominance was natural.

Having laid out the emergence of the prison as the dominant form of punishment, Foucault devotes the rest of the book to examining its precise form and function in society, laying bare the reasons for its continued use, and questioning the assumed results of its use.

=== Prison ===
In examining the construction of the prison as the central means of criminal punishment, Foucault builds a case for the idea that prison became part of a larger "carceral system" that has become an all-encompassing sovereign institution in modern society. Prison is one part of a vast network, including schools, military institutions, hospitals, and factories, which build a panoptic society for its members. This system creates "disciplinary careers" for those locked within its corridors. It is operated under the scientific authority of medicine, psychology, and criminology. Moreover, it operates according to principles that ensure that it "cannot fail to produce delinquents." Delinquency, indeed, is produced when social petty crime (such as taking wood from the lord's lands) is no longer tolerated, creating a class of specialized "delinquents" acting as the police's proxy in surveillance of society.

The structures Foucault chooses to use as his starting positions help highlight his conclusions. In particular, his choice as a perfect prison of the penal institution at Mettray helps personify the carceral system. Within it is included the Prison, the School, the Church, and the work-house (industry) – all of which feature heavily in his argument. The prisons at Neuchâtel and Mettray were perfect examples for Foucault, because they, even in their original state, began to show the traits for which Foucault was searching. Moreover, they showed the body of knowledge being developed about the prisoners, the creation of the "delinquent" class, and the disciplinary careers emerging.

== Reception ==
The publication of the book was "widely noted in major French cultural venues" of the time such as Le Nouvel Observateur and Le Monde. After its publication in English in 1977, it was "widely reviewed in non-academic venues", however scholarly reviews were "far less common".

The historian Peter Gay described Discipline and Punish as the key text by Foucault that has influenced scholarship on the theory and practice of 19th-century prisons. Though Gay wrote that Foucault "breathed fresh air into the history of penology and severely damaged, without wholly discrediting, traditional Whig optimism about the humanization of penitentiaries as one long success story", he nevertheless gave a negative assessment of Foucault's work, endorsing the critical view of Gordon Wright in his 1983 book Between the Guillotine and Liberty: Two Centuries of the Crime Problem in France. Gay concluded that Foucault and his followers overstate the extent to which keeping "the masses quiet" motivates those in power, thereby underestimating factors such as "contingency, complexity, the sheer anxiety or stupidity of power holders", or their authentic idealism.

Law Professor David Garland wrote an explication and critique of Discipline and Punish. Towards the end, he sums up the main critiques that have been made. He states, "the major critical theme which emerges, and is independently made by many different critics, concerns Foucault's overestimation of the political dimension. Discipline and Punish consistently proposes an explanation in terms of power—sometimes in the absence of any supporting evidence—where other historians would see a need for other factors and considerations to be brought into account."

Another criticism leveled against Foucault's approach is that he often studies the discourse of "prisons" rather than their concrete practice; this is taken up by Fred Alford:

"Foucault has mistaken the idea of prison, as reflected in the discourse of criminologists, for its practice. More precisely put, Foucault presents the utopian ideals of eighteenth-century prison reformers, most of which were never realized, as though they were the actual reforms of the eighteenth and nineteenth centuries. One can see this even in the pictures in Discipline and Punish, many of which are drawings for ideal prisons that were never built. One photograph is of the panopticon prison buildings at Stateville, but it is evidently an old photograph, one in which no inmates are evident. Nor are the blankets and cardboard that now enclose the cells."

== See also ==
- Discourse, a Foucauldian concept developed in Discipline and Punish, among other works.
- Dispositif
- Drill commands
- Foucauldian discourse analysis
- Governmentality
- The History of Sexuality
