= Roger Shuy =

American linguist (born 1931)

- Born: 1931 (age 94–95); Akron, Ohio, U.S.
- Occupations: Linguist; professor
- Known for: Sociolinguistics; Forensic linguistics

Academic background
- Education: Wheaton College (B.A.); Kent State University (M.A.); Case Western Reserve University (Ph.D.)
- Website: rogershuy.com

Roger Wellington Shuy (born January 5, 1931) is an American linguist best known for his work in sociolinguistics and forensic linguistics. He received his BA from Wheaton College in 1952, his MA from Kent State University in 1954, and his PhD from Case Western Reserve University in 1962, where he studied regional dialectology with Raven I. McDavid Jr. Shuy took additional linguistic courses at the University of Michigan and Indiana University.

After teaching linguistics at Wheaton College (1958–1964) and Michigan State University (1964–1967), Shuy accepted a position at the Center for Applied Linguistics in Washington, D.C., as head of its newly created program for studying urban language. In 1968, Shuy moved to Georgetown University, where he founded and directed the Sociolinguistics Program and was full professor of linguistics until he retired from teaching in 1998 as Distinguished Research Professor of Linguistics, emeritus. During his 30 years at Georgetown, Shuy helped create two new organizations, New Ways of Analyzing Variation and the American Association of Applied Linguistics, where he was its second president and was later given the award of Distinguished Scholarship and Service. While at Georgetown, he also began a new phase of work on criminal and civil cases as a consultant and expert witness. Shuy first testified as a linguistics expert for the defendant in Texas v. T. Cullen Davis. Shuy's 1979 testimony regarding undercover audio recordings led to Davis's acquittal.

After Shuy retired from teaching, he made his home among the mountains and rivers of Montana, where he continues to consult on law cases. Since 1998, Shuy has published fourteen books on forensic linguistics. In all, Shuy has worked on some 500 law cases, testifying at trial in over fifty criminal and civil cases in 26 states, four times before the U.S. Congress, and twice before the International Criminal Tribunal at The Hague. Among his most famous criminal cases were the Federal Bureau of Investigation's Abscam bribery investigation of New Jersey Senator Harrison A. Williams, the narcotics investigation of automobile manufacturer John Z. DeLorean, and many cases involving prominent politicians and businessmen. He has written extensively about many of these cases in his books and journal articles. In 2009, he was elected Fellow of the Linguistics Society of America.
