= The Hermeneutics of the Subject =

"The Hermeneutics of the Subject" is a lecture course originally given by the French philosopher and historian Michel Foucault at the Collège de France in the years 1981–1982. The course details Foucault's elaboration of such concepts as "practices of the self" and the "care of the self", as manifested in what Foucault refers to as their "golden age" in Hellenistic Greece and early Rome. Foucault argues that this period put much more emphasis on taking care of oneself (prendre soin de soi-même) than knowing oneself, whereas the converse is true today. The Hermeneutics of the Subject has been influential in terms of understanding the late Foucault's "ethical turn", and has increasingly been attracting more general philosophical attention.
