= Governmentality =

Concept in political science and philosophy

Governmentality is a theory of power developed by French philosopher Michel Foucault, which analyses "governmental" power through both the power states have over the population and the means by which subjects govern themselves.

As a form of power, governmentality differs from state discipline or punishment, which relies upon coercion to force individuals into specific actions. Rather, governmentality also comprises the power that individuals have within a population to self-govern, which the state may influence or guide through non-coercive means such as education.

The concept of governmentality has found application and reception in the fields of anthropology, history, law, philosophy, political science, and sociology. Prominent scholars include Peter Miller, Nikolas Rose and Mitchell Dean.

== History ==
The concept of "governmentality" was developed by Michel Foucault roughly between 1977 and his death in 1984, particularly in his lectures at the Collège de France during this time. Governmentality is a neologism, which some commentators have argued combines the terms "government" and "mentality" or "rationality", in this context, referring to modes of thinking. However, this view is disputed, with others arguing that the term is a mere combination of "government" and the suffix "-ality" to form the abstract noun "governmentality".

In using the word "government", Foucault did not only use the strictly political definition of "government" popular today, but he drew upon a broader definition of governing or government that was employed until the eighteenth century. For Foucault, "'government' also signified problems of self-control, guidance for the family and for children, management of the household, directing the soul, etc."

The development of governmentality segues from Foucault's ethical, political and historical thoughts from the late 1970s to the early 1980s. His most widely known formulation of this notion is his lecture entitled "Security, territory and population" (1978). Foucault elaborated on this concept in his course on "The Birth of Biopolitics" at the Collège de France in 1978–1979. The course was first published in French in 2004. Foucault's governmentality was part of a wider analysis on the topic of disciplinary institutions, neoliberalism, the "Rule of Law", the "microphysics of power" and also on what Foucault called biopolitics and power-knowledge. In a series of lectures and articles, he posed questions about the nature of contemporary social orders, the conceptualization of power, human freedom and the limits, possibilities and sources of human actions that were linked to his understanding of the notion of "governmentality".

The notion of governmentality first gained wider attention in the English-speaking academic world through the edited book The Foucault Effect (1991), which contained a series of essays on the notion of governmentality, together with a translation of Foucault's 1978 short text on "gouvernementalité".

== Definition ==
Governmentality is most popularly defined as the "conduct of conduct". It has also been described as the organized practices (mentalities, rationalities, and techniques) through which subjects are governed, the "art of government", the calculated means of directing how we behave and act), "governmental rationality", "a 'guideline' for the analysis that Michel Foucault offers by way of historical reconstructions embracing a period starting from Ancient Greece right through to modernity and neo-liberalism", "the techniques and strategies by which a society is rendered governable", and the "reasoned way of governing best and, at the same time, reflection on the best possible way of governing".

=== Foucault ===
In his lecture titled Governmentality, Foucault defines governmentality as:

"1. The ensemble formed by the institutions, procedures, analyses and reflections, the calculations and tactics that allow the exercise of this very specific albeit complex form of power, which has as its target: population, as its principal form of knowledge: political economy, and as its essential technical means: apparatuses of security.

2. The tendency which, over a long period and throughout the West, has steadily led towards the pre-eminence over all other forms (sovereignty, discipline, etc) of this type of power which may be termed government, resulting, on the one hand, in formation of a whole series of specific governmental apparatuses, and, on the other, in the development of a whole complex of savoirs.

3. The process, or rather the result of the process, through which the state of justice of the Middle Ages, transformed into the administrative state during the fifteenth and sixteenth centuries, gradually becomes 'governmentalized'."

The last part of Foucault's definition of governmentality describes the evolution from the Medieval state, which maintained its territory and an ordered territorial society through the blunt and simple imposition of laws upon subjects, to the early Renaissance state, which became more concerned with the "disposing of things", and so began to employ strategies and tactics to maintain a content and thus stable society, or in other words to "render a society governable". Read with the first two definitions, the third definition describes the process through which a form of government with specific ends, means to these ends ("apparatuses of security"), and with a particular type of knowledge ("political economy") to achieve these ends, evolved from a medieval state of justice to a modern administrative state with complex bureaucracies.

=== Further development ===
Hunt and Wickham, in their work Foucault and Law (1994) begin the section on governmentality with a very basic definition derived from Foucault: "governmentality is the dramatic expansion in the scope of government, featuring an increase in the number and size of the governmental calculation mechanisms". In giving this definition, Hunt and Wickham conceive of the term as consisting of two parts 'governmental' and '–ity', with 'governmental' pertaining to the government of a country; and the suffix –ity meaning the study of. They also contextualise the definition in broader Foucaultian theory referring to concepts such as the reason of state, the problem of population, modern political economy, liberal securitisation, and the emergence of the human sciences.

Kerr's approach to the term is more complex. He conceives of the term as an abbreviation of "governmental rationality" [1999:174]. In other words, it is a way of thinking about the government and the practices of the government. To him it is not "a zone of critical-revolutionary study, but one that conceptually reproduces capitalist rule" [1999:197] by asserting that some form of government (and power) will always be necessary to control and constitute society.

==== Dean ====
Dean's understanding of the term incorporates both other forms of governance and the idea of mentalities of government, as well as Hunt and Wickham's, and Kerr's approaches to the term. In line with Hunt and Wickham's approach, Dean acknowledges that in a very narrow sense, governmentality can be used to describe the emergence of a government that saw that the object of governing power was to optimise, use and foster living individuals as members of a population [1999:19]. He also includes the idea of government rationalities, seeing governmentality as one way of looking at the practices of government. In addition to the above, he sees government as anything to do with conducting oneself or others: "Governmentality: How we think about governing others and ourselves in a wide variety of contexts" including the analysis of those mechanisms that try to shape, sculpt, mobilise and work through the choices, desires, aspirations, needs, wants and lifestyles of individuals and groups [Dean, 1999:12].

Dean's main contribution to the definition of the term, however, comes from the way he breaks the term up into 'govern' 'mentality', or mentalities of governing—mentality being a mental disposition or outlook. This means that the concept of governmentality is not just a tool for thinking about government and governing but also incorporates how and what people who are governed think about the way they are governed. He defines thinking as a "collective activity" [1999:16], that is, the sum of the knowledge, beliefs and opinions held by those who are governed. He also raises the point that a mentality is not usually "examined by those who inhabit it" [1999:16]. This raises the point that those who are governed may not understand the unnaturalness of both the way they live and the fact that they take this way of life for granted—that the same activity in which they engage in "can be regarded as a different form of practice depending on the mentalities that invest it" [1999:17]. Dean highlights another important feature of the concept of governmentality—its reflexivity. He explains:

On the one hand, we govern others and ourselves according to what we take to be true about who we are, what aspects of our existence should be worked upon, how, with what means, and to what ends. On the other hand, the ways in which we govern and conduct ourselves give rise to different ways of producing truth. [1999:18]

According to Dean, any definition of governmentality should incorporate all of Foucault's intended ideas. A complete definition of the term governmentality must include not only government in terms of the state, but government in terms of any "conduct of conduct" [Dean, 1999:10]. It must incorporate the idea of mentalities and the associations that go with that concept: that it is an attitude towards something, and that it is not usually understood "from within its own perspective" [1999:16], and that these mentalities are collective and part of a society's culture. It must also include an understanding of the ways in which conduct is governed, not just by governments, but also by others as well.

== Components ==
=== Mentality of rule ===
A mentality of rule is any relatively systematic way of thinking about government. It delineates a discursive field in which the exercise of power is 'rationalised' [Lemke, 2001:191]. For example, neo-liberalism is a mentality of rule because it represents a method of rationalising the exercise of government, a rationalisation that obeys the internal rule of maximum economy [Foucault, 1997:74].

Fukuyama [in Rose, 1999: 63] writes "a liberal State is ultimately a limited State, with governmental activity strictly bounded by the sphere of individual liberty". However, as Rose notes, only a certain type of liberty, a certain way of understanding and exercising freedom, is compatible with neo-liberalism; if neo-liberalist government is to fully realize its goals, individuals must come to recognize and act upon themselves as both free and responsible [Rose, 1999:68].

As Lemke states, a mentality of government "is not pure, neutral knowledge that simply re-presents the governing reality" [Lemke, 2001:191]. Through the transformation of subjects with duties and obligations, into individuals, with rights and freedoms, modern individuals are not merely 'free to choose' but obliged to be free, "to understand and enact their lives in terms of choice" [Rose, 1999:87].

=== From governmentality to neoliberal governmentality: cartography ===
==== Governmentality and cartography ====
Cartographic mapping has historically been a key strategy of governmentality. Harley, drawing on Foucault, affirms that State-produced maps "extend and reinforce the legal statutes, territorial imperatives, and values stemming from the exercise of political power". Typically, State-led mapping conforms to Bentham's concept of a panopticon, in which 'the one views the many'. From a Foucauldian vantage point, this was the blueprint for disciplinary power.

==== Neoliberal governmentality and cartography ====
Through processes of neoliberalism, the State has "hollowed out" some of its cartographic responsibilities and delegated power to individuals who are at a lower geographical scale. 'People's cartography' is believed to deliver a more democratic spatial governance than traditional top-down State-distribution of cartographic knowledge. Joyce challenges Foucauldian notions of Panopticism, contending that neoliberal governmentality is more adequately conceptualised by an omniopticon - 'the many surveilling the many'. Collaborative mapping initiatives utilising GPS technology are arguably omniopticons, with the ability to reverse the panoptic gaze.

=== Self-governing capabilities ===
Through freedom, particular self-governing capabilities can be installed in order to bring our own ways of conducting and evaluating ourselves into alignment with political objectives [Rose, 1996:155]. These capabilities are enterprise and autonomy.

"Enterprise" designates an array of rules for the conduct of one's everyday existence: energy, initiative, ambition, calculation, and personal responsibility. The enterprising self will make an enterprise of its life, seek to maximize its own human capital, project itself a future, and seek to shape life in order to become what it wishes to be. The enterprising self is thus both an active self and a calculating self, a self that calculates about itself and that acts upon itself in order to better itself [Rose, 1996:154].

"Autonomy" refers to the adoption of undertakings, definition of goals, and planning to achieve needs through the powers of self [Rose, 1996:159]. Seem from this view, the autonomy of the self is thus not the eternal antithesis of political power, but one of the objectives and instruments of modern mentalities for the conduct of conduct [Rose, 1996:155].

=== Technologies of power ===
Technologies of power are those "technologies imbued with aspirations for the shaping of conduct in the hope of producing certain desired effects and averting certain undesired ones" [Rose, 1999:52]. The two main groups of technologies of power are technologies of the self, and technologies of the market.

Foucault defined technologies of the self as techniques that allow individuals to effect by their own means a certain number of operations on their own bodies, minds, souls, and lifestyle, so as to transform themselves in order to attain a certain state of happiness, and quality of life. Technologies of the market are those technologies based around the buying and selling of goods that enable persons to define who they are, or want to be. These two technologies are not always completely distinct.

==== Technologies of the self ====
Technologies of the self refer to the practices and strategies by which individuals represent to themselves their own ethical self-understanding. One of the main features of technologies of self is that of expertise. In governmentalist theory, expertise has three important aspects.

First, its grounding of authority in a claim to scientificity and objectivity creates distance between self-regulation and the state that is necessary with liberal democracies. Second, expertise can "mobilise and be mobilised within political argument in distinctive ways, producing a new relationship between knowledge and government. Expertise comes to be accorded a particular role in the formulation of programs of government and in the technologies that seek to give them effect" [Rose, 1996:156]. Third, expertise operates through a relationship with the self-regulating abilities of individuals. The plausibility inherent in a claim to scientificity binds "subjectivity to truth and subjects to experts" [Rose, 1996:156]. Expertise works through a logic of choice, through a transformation of the ways in which individuals constitute themselves, through "inculcating desires for self-development that expertise itself can guide and through claims to be able to allay the anxieties generated when the actuality of life fails to live up to its image [Rose, 1999:88].

==== Responsibilisation ====
In line with its desire to reduce the scope of government (e.g. welfare) Neo-liberalism characteristically develops indirect techniques for leading and controlling individuals without being responsible for them. The main mechanism is through the technology of responsibilisation. This entails subjects becoming responsibilised by making them see social risks such as illness, unemployment, poverty, and public safety not as the responsibility of the state, but actually lying in the domain for which the individual is responsible and transforming it into a problem of 'self-care' [Lemke, 2001:201] and of 'consumption'.

==== Healthism ====
Healthism links the "public objectives for the good health and good order of the social body with the desire of individuals for health and well-being" [Rose, 1999:74]. Healthy bodies and hygienic homes may still be objectives of the state, but it no longer seeks to discipline, instruct, moralise or threaten subjects into compliance.

Rather, "individuals are addressed on the assumption that they want to be healthy and enjoined to freely seek out the ways of living most likely to promote their own health" [Rose, 1999:86-87].

==== Normalisation ====
Another technology of power arising from the social sciences is that of normalisation. The technology of norms was given a push by the new methods of measuring population. A norm is that "which is socially worthy, statistically average, scientifically healthy and personally desirable". The important aspect of normality, is that while the norm is natural, those who wish to achieve normality will do so by working on themselves, controlling their impulses in everyday conduct and habits, and inculcating norms of conduct into their children, under the guidance of others. Norms are enforced through the calculated administration of shame. Shame entails an anxiety over the exterior behaviour and appearance of the self, linked to an injunction to care for oneself in the name of achieving quality of life [Rose, 1999:73].

==== Self-esteem ====
Self-esteem is a practical and productive technology linked to the technology of norms, which produces of certain kinds of selves. Self-esteem is a technology in the sense that it is a specialised knowledge of how to esteem ourselves to estimate, calculate, measure, evaluate, discipline, and to judge our selves. The 'self-esteem' approach considers a wide variety of social problems to have their source in a lack of self-esteem on the part of the persons concerned. 'Self-esteem' thus has much more to do with self-assessment than with self-respect, as the self continuously has to be measured, judged and disciplined in order to gear personal 'empowerment' to collective yardsticks. These collective yardsticks are determined by the norms previously discussed. Self-esteem is a technology of self for "evaluating and acting upon ourselves so that the police, the guards and the doctors do not have to do so".

==== Technologies of the market ====
The technologies of the market can be described as the technology of desire, and the technology of identity through consumption. The technology of desire is a mechanism that induces desires that individuals work to satisfy. Marketers create wants and artificial needs in us through advertising goods, experiences and lifestyles that are tempting. These advertisements seek to convey the sense of individual satisfaction brought about by the purchase or use of this product.

The technology of identity through consumption utilises the power of goods to shape identities. Each commodity is imbued with a particular meaning, which is reflected upon those who purchase it, illuminating the kind of person they are or want to be. Consumption is thus portrayed as placing an individual within a certain form of life.

These technologies of the market and of the self are the particular mechanisms whereby individuals are induced into becoming free, enterprising individuals who govern themselves and thus need only limited direct governance by the state. The implementation of these technologies is greatly assisted by experts from the social sciences. These experts operate a regime of the self, where success in life depends on continual exercise of freedom, and where life is understood not in terms of fate or social status, but in terms of our success or failure in acquiring the skills and making the choices to actualise ourself. Therefore, marketing under these conditions is largely aimed at persuading consumers that their participation enhances their freedom, for example in the possibility of choosing between many choices of products, or in the existence of products that supposedly underscore consumers' specific identities and desires.

The parts of self that are sought to be worked upon, the means by which one does so, and the eventual hope of becoming a new self, all vary according to the nature of the technology of power by which one is motivated [Dean, 1999:17].

== Applications and extensions ==
=== Ecogovernmentality ===
Ecogovernmentality (or eco-governmentality) is the application of Foucault's concepts of biopower and governmentality to the analysis of the regulation of social interactions with the natural world. Timothy W. Luke theorized this as environmentality and green governmentality. Ecogovernmentality began in the mid-1990s with a small body of theorists (Luke, Darier, and Rutherford) the literature on ecogovernmentality grew as a response to the perceived lack of Foucauldian analysis of environmentalism and in environmental studies.

=== Crises of governmentality ===
According to Foucault, there are several instances where the Western, "liberal art of government" enters into a period of crisis, where the logic of ensuring freedom (which was defined against the background of risk or danger) necessitates actions "which potentially risk producing exactly the opposite."

The inherently contradictory logics that lead to such contradictions are identified by Foucault as:

1. Liberalism depends on the socialization of individuals to fear the constant presence of danger, e.g., public campaigns advocating savings banks, public hygiene, and disease prevention, the development of detective novels as a genre and of news stories of crime, and sexual anxieties surrounding "degeneration".
2. Liberal freedom requires disciplinary techniques that manage the individual's behaviour and everyday life so as to ensure productivity and the increase in profit through efficient labour, e.g., Bentham's Panopticon surveillance system. Liberalism claims to supervise the natural mechanisms of behaviour and production, but must intervene when it notices "irregularities."
3. Liberalism must force individuals to be free: control and intervention becomes the entire basis of freedom. Freedom must ultimately be manufactured by control rather than simply "counterweighted" by it.

Examples of this contradictory logic which Foucault cites are the policies of the Keynesian welfare state under F.D. Roosevelt, the thought of the German liberals in the Freiburg school, and the thought of American libertarian economists such as the Chicago School which attempt to free individuals from the lack of freedom perceived to exist under socialism and fascism, but did so by using state interventionist models.

These governmental crises may be triggered by phenomena such as a discursive concern with increasing economic capital costs for the exercise of freedom, e.g., prices for purchasing resources, the need for excessive state coercion and interventionism to protect market freedoms, e.g., anti-trust and anti-monopoly legislation that leads to a "legal strait-jacket" for the state, local protests rejecting the disciplinary mechanisms of the market society and state. and finally, the destructive and wasteful effects of ineffective mechanisms for producing freedom.

=== Application to health care ===
Scholars have recently suggested that the concept of governmentality may be useful in explaining the operation of evidence-based health care and the internalization of clinical guidelines relating to best practice for patient populations, such as those developed by the American Agency for Health Care Research and Quality and the British National Institute for Health and Clinical Excellence (NICE).

Research has also explored potential micro-level resistance to governmentality in health care and how governmentally is enacted into health care practice, drawing on Foucault's notion of pastoral power.

=== Beyond the West ===
Jeffreys and Sigley (2009) highlight that governmentality studies have focused on advanced liberal democracies, and preclude considerations of non-liberal forms of governmentality in both western and non-western contexts. Recent studies have broken new ground by applying Foucault's concept of governmentality to non-western and non-liberal settings, such as China. Jeffreys (2009) for example provides a collection of essay on China's approach to governance, development, education, the environment, community, religion, and sexual health where the notion of 'Chinese governmentally' is based not on the notion of 'freedom and liberty' as in the western tradition but rather, on a distinct rational approach to planning and administration.

Another well-known study is Li (2007), an account of development in action. Focusing on attempts to improve landscapes and livelihoods in Indonesia, Li exposes the practices that enable experts to diagnose problems and devise interventions, and the agency of people whose conduct is targeted for reform.

Katomero (2017) also employs governmentality in a development context, this time to describe accountability practices in the water supply sector in Tanzania.

Some studies illustrate that in societies that are influenced by global capitalism, the model of governmentality is limited to specific spaces and practices rather than dictating a wholesome ethos of citizenship. For example, in China, people who practice “self-cultivation” through various educational programs in psychology or communication skills often treat these activities as a place where they can perform individualistic personalities in contrast to their ordinary social responsibilities. Moreover, these activities may be oriented at promoting social change as much as they aim to regulate the capacities of the self.

== See also ==
- Interpellation (philosophy)
- Inverted totalitarianism
- Political power
- Rationality and power
- Therapeutic governance
