= The Birth of the Clinic =

1963 book by Michel Foucault

- Cover of the first edition
- Author: Michel Foucault
- Original title: Naissance de la clinique – Une archéologie du regard médical
- Translator: Alan Sheridan
- Language: French
- Published: 1963 (Presses universitaires de France); 1973 (in English)
- Publication place: France
- Media type: Print
- OCLC: 12214239
- Preceded by: Madness and Civilization
- Followed by: The Order of Things

The Birth of the Clinic: An Archaeology of Medical Perception (French: Naissance de la clinique – Une archéologie du regard médical), a 1963 book by Michel Foucault, presents the development of la clinique (the teaching hospital) as a medical institution. The work identifies and describes the concept of le regard médical (lit. 'the medical gaze'), and the epistemic re-organisation of the research structures of medicine in the production of medical knowledge at the end of the eighteenth century. Although originally limited to the academic discourses of post-modernism and post-structuralism, the medical gaze term is used in graduate medicine and social work.

== The medical gaze ==
In the genealogy of medicine—knowledge about the human body—the term le regard médical (the medical gaze) identifies the doctor's practice of objectifying the body of the patient, as separate and apart from their personal identity. In the treatment of illness, the intellectual and material structures of la clinique, the teaching hospital, made possible the inspection, examination, and analysis of the human body, yet the clinic was part of the socio-economic interests of power. Therefore, when the patient's body entered the field of medicine, it also entered the field of power where the patient can be manipulated by the professional authority of the medical gaze.

In the 18th century, when the French (1789–1799) and the American (1775–1783) revolutions inaugurated the Modern era those events also established a meta-narrative of scientific discourse that presented scientists as sages—specifically, the medical doctors—who would abolish sickness and resolve the problems of humanity. By that cultural perception, 19th-century society replaced the scientifically discredited mediaeval clergy with medical doctors. The myth of medical sagacity was integral to the meta-narrative discourse of Humanism and of the Age of Enlightenment (17th–18th c.)—a historical period when people believed that the human body was the person. Such biological reductionism gave power of authority to doctors when they applied their medical gaze to the body of the patient, an interaction that allowed unparalleled medical understanding of patient and illness. In turn, the cultural perception of the medical gaze was the doctor’s near-mystical capability to discover hidden truth.

== The epistemic change ==
Foucault's thesis about the birth of the clinic (teaching hospital) contradicts the histories of medicine that present the late 18th century as the beginning of a new empirical system "based on the rediscovery of the absolute values of the visible" material reality. The birth of modern medicine was not a common-sense move towards seeing what already existed, but actually was a paradigm shift in the intellectual structures for the production of knowledge, which made clinical medicine a new way of thinking about the body and illness, disease and medicine:

The clinic—constantly praised for its empiricism, the modesty of its attention, and the care with which it silently lets things surface to the observing [medical] gaze without disturbing them with discourse—owes its real importance to the fact that it is a reorganization-in-depth, not only of medical discourse, but of the very possibility of a discourse about disease.

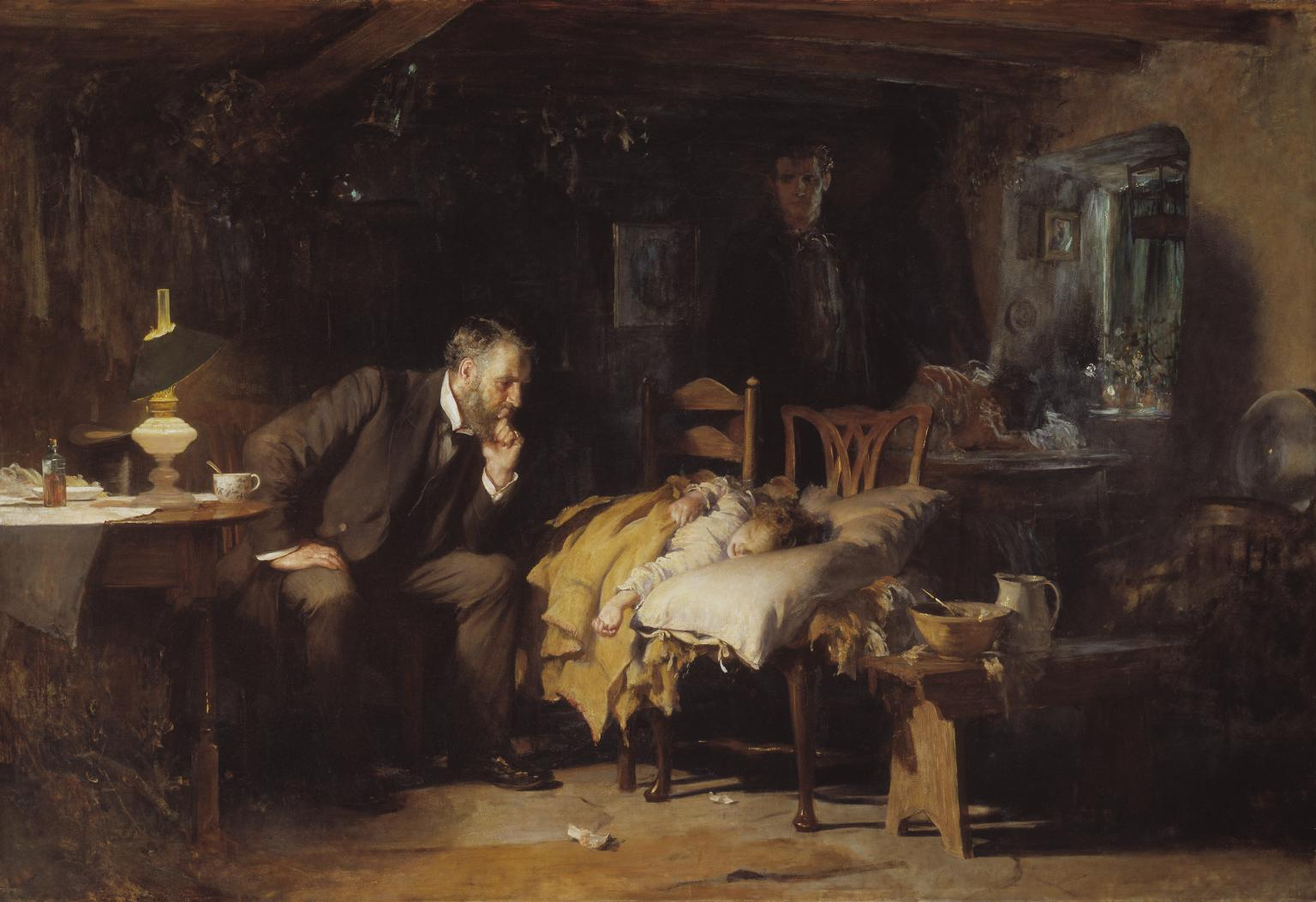
The Doctor by Sir Luke Fildes (1891)

In that light, the empiricism of the 18th and 19th centuries was not a dispassionate act of looking, noting, and reporting the disease presented before the doctor's eyes. The relationship between doctor and patient (subject and object) is not about the one who knows and the one who tells, because doctor–patient interactions are not "mindless phenomenologies" that existed before their consultation (medical discourse) as patient and doctor. Clinical medicine came to exist as part of the intellectual structure that defines and organises medicine as "the domain of its experience and the structure of its rationality" as a field of knowledge.

That epistemic change allowed a new way of thinking that replaced old scientific concepts with new scientific concepts. In The Order of Things: An Archaeology of the Human Sciences (1966), Foucault showed how history replaced taxonomy, systematic knowledge replaced collections of data. The teaching hospital, la clinique, was established upon the new medical praxis of verifiable observation, which is scientifically more accurate than the old medical praxis based upon religious interpretations of disease.

In the 18th century, the professional authority of the doctor was based upon his command of the organised medical knowledge of his time; in the 19th century, a doctor's authority derived from his command of the new, verifiable clinical medicine. An 18th-century doctor would examine a diseased organ as would a 19th-century doctor, yet, because of their different medical cultures, these doctors would reach different conclusions about the cause and treatment of the disease. Despite their perceptual differences of diagnosis, each medical report would be "true", because each doctor diagnosed according to a generally accepted way of thinking (an episteme) in which their respective forms of organised medical knowledge were considered factual. Hence, despite their medical researches having occurred thirty years apart, the father of anatomical pathology, Giovanni Battista Morgagni (1682–1771), and the father of histology, Xavier Bichat (1771–1802), did not practise the same human anatomy.

== See also ==
- The Archaeology of Knowledge
