= Foucault (Deleuze book) =

1986 book by Gilles Deleuze

- Authors: Gilles Deleuze
- Translators: Seán Hand
- Language: French
- Subject: Michel Foucault
- Published: 1986 (Les Éditions de Minuit, in French); 1988 (University of Minnesota Press, in English)
- Publication place: France
- Media type: Print (Hardcover and Paperback)
- Pages: 141 (French edition); 157 (University of Minnesota Press edition)
- ISBN: 0-8166-1674-4 (University of Minnesota Press edition)
- Followed by: The Fold: Leibniz and the Baroque (1988)

Foucault is a 1986 book on the work of Michel Foucault by the philosopher Gilles Deleuze. Deleuze, like in his other works on major philosophers, thinks along with Foucault instead of trying to write a guide to his philosophy. The book focuses on the conceptual underpinnings of Foucault's extensive work by considering in depth two of his paradigmatic works, The Archaeology of Knowledge (1969) and Discipline and Punish (1975).
