= Genealogy (philosophy) =

Historical technique in philosophy

In philosophy, genealogy is a historical technique in which one questions the commonly understood emergence of various philosophical and social beliefs by attempting to account for the scope, breadth, or totality of discourse, thus extending the possibility of analysis. Moreover, a genealogy often attempts to look beyond the discourse in question toward the conditions of their possibility (particularly in Michel Foucault's genealogies). It has been developed as a continuation of the works of Friedrich Nietzsche. Genealogy is opposed to the Marxist use of ideology to explain the totality of historical discourse within the time period in question by focusing on a singular or dominant discourse (ideology).

For example, tracking the lineages of a concept such as 'globalization' can be called a 'genealogy' to the extent that the concept is located in its changing constitutive setting. This entails not just documenting its changing meaning (etymology) but the social basis of its changing meaning.

== Nietzsche ==
Nietzsche criticized "the genealogists" in On the Genealogy of Morals and proposed the use of a historic philosophy to critique modern morality by supposing that it developed into its current form through power relations. However, scholars note that he emphasizes that, rather than being purely necessary developments of power relations, these developments are to be exposed as at least partially contingent, the upshot being that the present conception of morality could always have been constituted otherwise. Even though the philosophy of Nietzsche has been characterized as genealogy, he only uses the term in On the Genealogy of Morals. The later philosophy that has been influenced by Nietzsche, and which is commonly described as genealogy, shares several fundamental aspects of Nietzschean philosophical insight. Nietzschean historic philosophy has been described as "a consideration of oppositional tactics" that embraces, as opposed to forecloses, the conflict between philosophical and historical accounts.

== Foucault ==
In the late twentieth century, Michel Foucault expanded the concept of genealogy into a counter-history of the position of the subject which traces the development of people and societies through history. His genealogy of the subject accounts "for the constitution of knowledges, discourses, domains of objects, and so on, without having to make reference to a subject which is either transcendental in relation to the field of events or runs in its empty sameness throughout the course of history."

As Foucault discussed in his essay "Nietzsche, Genealogy, History", Foucault's ideas of genealogy were greatly influenced by the work that Nietzsche had done on the development of morals through power. Foucault also describes genealogy as a particular investigation into those elements which "we tend to feel [are] without history". This would include things such as sexuality, and other elements of everyday life. Genealogy is not the search for origins, and is not the construction of a linear development. Instead, it seeks to show the plural and sometimes contradictory past that reveals traces of the influence that power has had on truth.

As one of the important theories of Michel Foucault, genealogy deconstructs truth, arguing that truth is, more often than not, discovered by chance, backed up by the operation of Power/knowledge or the consideration of interest. Furthermore, all truths are questionable. Pointing out the unreliability of truth, which is often accused of "having a tendency of relativity and nihilism", the theory flatly refuses the uniformity and regularity of history, emphasizing the irregularity and inconstancy of truth and toppling the notion that history progresses in a linear order.

The practice of genealogy is also closely linked to what Foucault called the "archaeological method":

In short, it seems that from the empirical observability for us of an ensemble to its historical acceptability, to the very period of time in which it is actually observable, the analysis goes by way of the knowledge-power nexus, supporting it, recouping it at the point where it is accepted, moving toward what makes it acceptable, of course, not in general, but only where it is accepted. This is what can be characterized as recouping it in its positivity. Here, then, is a type of procedure, which, unconcerned with legitimizing and consequently excluding the fundamental point of view of the law, runs through the cycle of positivity by proceeding from the fact of acceptance to the system of acceptability analyzed through the knowledge-power interplay. Let us say that this is, approximately, the archaeological level [of analysis].

== See also ==
- History of ideas
- The Archaeology of Knowledge
- Geistesgeschichte
- Hermeneutics
- Diachrony
- Untimely Meditations – 1873–76 collection of essays by Friedrich Nietzsche
