= Chloë Taylor (philosopher) =

Canadian philosopher (born 1976)

Chloë Taylor (born 1976) is a Canadian philosopher and scholar of women's and gender studies. She is a Professor of Women’s and Gender Studies at the University of Alberta, where she has worked since 2009. Her areas of research include Michel Foucault, prison abolition, feminist philosophy, and critical animal studies.

== Education and career ==
Taylor studied for a BA in philosophy at the University of Victoria from 1995 to 1998, before studying for a BA at McGill University, majoring in the history of art and minoring in German studies from 1998 to 2000. She remained at McGill to read for an MA in art history, graduating in 2002 having written a thesis entitled The Aesthetics of Sadism and Masochism in Italian Renaissance Painting. From 2002 until 2006, she read for a PhD in philosophy at the University of Toronto. Her thesis was entitled The Culture of Confession. Taylor was supervised by Rebecca Comay, and her other committee members were Amy Mullin and Matthias Fritsch.

After completing her studies, Taylor returned to McGill as a Social Sciences and Humanities Research Council and Tomlinson Postdoctoral Fellow in the Department of Philosophy. In 2008, she published her first monograph, The Culture of Confession from Augustine to Foucault, which was a revised version of her doctoral thesis. In the book, she interrogates Michel Foucault's account of confession. In the same year, she took up a tenure track assistant professorship in the philosophy of race and gender at the University of North Florida; the following year, she moved to the University of Alberta as an assistant professor of philosophy. In 2011, she became an assistant professor in philosophy and women's and gender studies. Asian Perspectives on Animal Ethics, which Taylor co-edited with Neil Dalal, was published in 2014.

Taylor was promoted to associate professor in 2015. She published second edited volume, Feminist Philosophies of Life, co-edited with Hasana Sharp, in 2016, as well as a guidebook to Foucault's The History of Sexuality. Taylor became solely affiliated with women's and gender studies in 2017. In 2019, she was promoted to full professor. In the same year, she published Foucault, Feminism, and Sex Crimes, in which she applies Foucault's analyses of sexuality and punishment to contemporary responses to sex crimes. She went on to publish four further edited collections: Colonialism and Animality (with Kelly Struthers Montford) in 2020; Disability and Animality (with Stephanie Jenkins and Kelly Struthers Montford) in 2021; Building Abolition (with Kelly Struthers Montford) in 2022; and The Routledge Companion to Gender and Animals in 2024.

== Selected works ==
=== Authored books ===
- Taylor, Chloë (2010). The Culture of Confession from Augustine to Foucault: A Genealogy of the 'Confessing Animal'. Abingdon: Routledge.
- Taylor, Chloë (2016). The Routledge Guidebook to Foucault's The History of Sexuality. Abingdon: Routledge.
- Taylor, Chloë (2019). Foucault, Feminism, and Sex Crimes: An Anti-Carceral Analysis. Abingdon: Routledge.

=== Edited books ===
- Dalal, Neil, and Chloë Taylor, eds. (2014). Asian Perspectives on Animal Ethics: Rethinking the Nonhuman. Abingdon: Routledge.
- Sharp, Hasana, and Chloë Taylor, eds. (2016). Feminist Philosophies of Life. Montreal and Kingston: McGill-Queen's University Press.
- Montford, Kelly Struthers, and Chloë Taylor, eds. (2020). Colonialism and Animality: Anti-Colonial Perspectives in Critical Animal Studies. Abingdon: Routledge.
- Jenkins, Stephanie, Kelly Struthers Montford, and Chloë Taylor, eds. (2020). Disability and Animality: Crip Perspectives in Critical Animal Studies. Abingdon: Routledge.
- Montford, Kelly Struthers, and Chloë Taylor, eds. (2022). Building Abolition: Decarceration and Social Justice. Abingdon: Routledge.
- Taylor, Chloë, ed. (2024). The Routledge Companion to Gender and Animals. Abingdon: Routledge.
