= François Ewald =

French philosopher (born 1946)

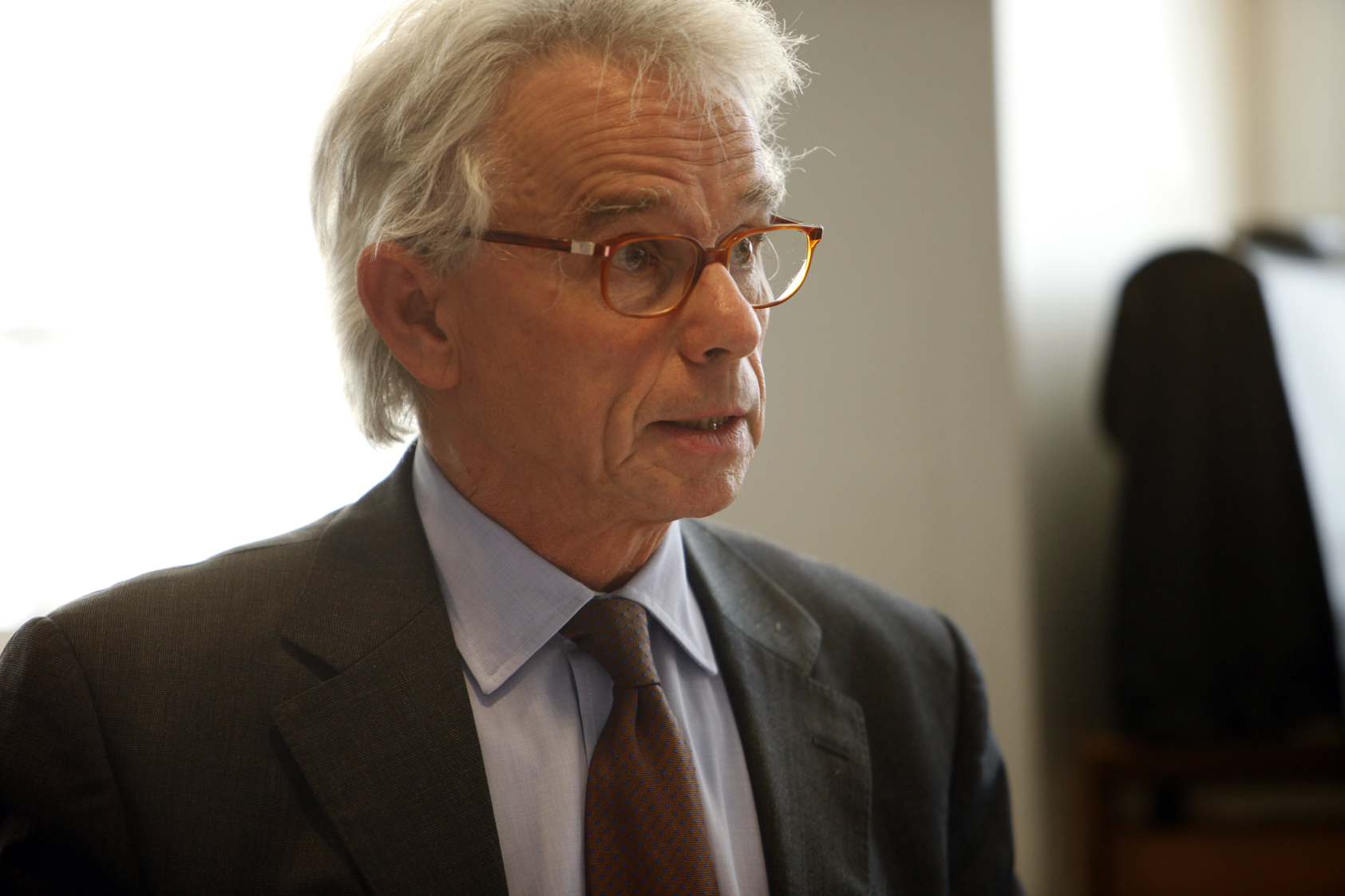
François Ewald

François (Robert) Ewald (born 29 April 1946, in Boulogne-Billancourt) is a French philosopher. An assistant to Michel Foucault in the 1970s, he has overseen the publication of much of Foucault's literary estate. Ewald's own work has applied Foucault's notion of governmentality to a history of the welfare state.

== Life ==
Ewald studied philosophy at the Sorbonne in the mid-1960s. After the events of May 1968, he joined the Maoist Gauche prolétarienne (GP). Teaching philosophy at a Bruay-en-Artois lycée in the early 1970s, he was at the centre of the political drama which unfolded when a middle-class lawyer was arrested for the mutilation and murder of a local miner's daughter: La Cause du Peuple, the GP's paper, publicized the case with the headline 'Bruay: And Now They Are Massacring Our Children!'

Foucault met Ewald when visiting to inspect the scene of the murder in June 1972, and after the GP imploded Ewald turned to Foucault to reconstruct his intellectual outlook. Ewald was Foucault's assistant from 1976 until Foucault's death in 1984, and has co-edited posthumous volumes of Foucault's writings and lectures.

Invited by Daniel Defert to contribute to a government report on workplace accidents, Ewald came to view the 1898 Law on Accidents at Work — with an actuarial concept of risk replacing juridical concepts of responsibility — as crucial to the modern welfare state. Ewald interpreted Foucault's analysis of power as showing the need for political struggle without any "reference to the Revolution", and moved closer to the New Philosophers in a call "to marry the points of view of Nietzsche and Solzhenitsyn". By the early 1990s Ewald "had become the house intellectual of the French insurance industry and ideological standard-bearer of the Medef, France's primary employers' organization."

François Ewald was part of the "Coppens commission" who prepared the French Charter for the Environment of 2004. In 2006 he received the Legion d'Honneur.

== Works ==
- L'état providence [The Welfare State], Paris: B. Grasset, 1986.
- (ed. with Florence Bellivier et al.) Naissance du Code civil: la raison du législateur [The birth of the Civil Code: the legislator's reason], Paris: Flammarion, 1989.
- 'Norms, Discipline and the Law', Representations 30 (Spring 1990), pp. 138–61
- 'Insurance and Risk', in Graham Burchell, Colin Gordon & Peter Miller, eds., The Foucault Effect, Chicago, 1991
- Histoire de l'Etat providence: Les Origines de la solidarité [History of the welfare state: the origins of solidarity], 1996.
- (ed. with Jean-Hervé Lorenzi) Encyclopédie de l'assurance [Encyclopedia of insurance], Paris: Economica, 1997.
- (ed. with T. McGleenan & Urban Wiesing) Genetics and insurance, Oxford, UK: Bios Scientific Publishers, 1999.
- 'Foucault and the contemporary scene', Philosophy and Social Criticism 25: 3 (1999), pp. 81–91
- Le principe de précaution [The precautionary principle], 2001.
