= Clinical gaze =

Clinical gaze may refer to:

- General clinical experience by a physician
- Medical gaze, a dehumanizing medical separation of the patient's body from the patient's person (identity)
