= Daniel Defert =

French sociologist and AIDS activist (1937–2023)

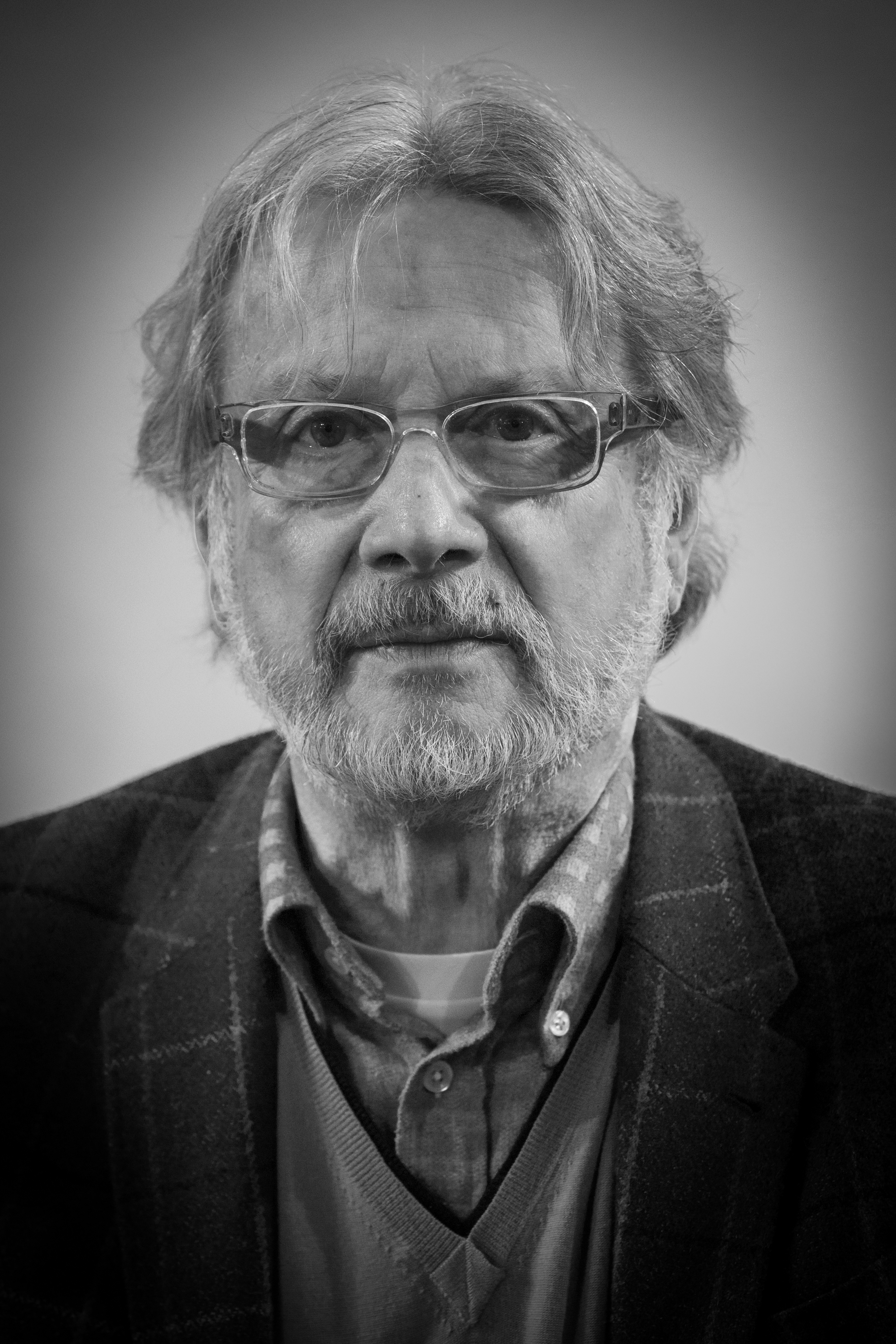
- Defert in 2015
- Born: Daniel André Defert; 10 September 1937; Avallon, France
- Died: 7 February 2023 (aged 85); Paris, France
- Education: École normale supérieure de Saint-Cloud
- Occupation: Sociologist
- Partner: Michel Foucault

Daniel Defert (French: [danjɛl dəfɛʁ]; 10 September 1937 – 7 February 2023) was a French sociologist and HIV/AIDS activist. Partner to the late Michel Foucault, Defert co-founded France's first AIDS advocacy group, AIDES, following Foucault's death from complications related to the disease. Defert was the heir to Foucault's estate.

== Early life ==
Daniel Defert was born on 10 September 1937. He graduated from the École normale supérieure de Saint-Cloud. He earned the agrégation in philosophy. Defert met Foucault while he was his philosophy student at the University of Clermont-Ferrand in France and their relationship lasted from 1963 until Foucault's death in 1984.

== Early academic career ==
A professor of sociology, Daniel Defert was assistant (1969–1970), maître-assistant (1971–1985), then maître de conférence (from 1985) at the Centre Universitaire of Vincennes, which became in 1972 Université Paris VIII Vincennes.

== AIDS research and activism ==
After the death of his partner Michel Foucault from complications related to AIDS, Defert founded AIDES, the first AIDS awareness organization in France. The name invokes the French word for "help" as well as the English acronym for the disease (the French acronym is SIDA). Defert served as president of AIDES from 1984 to 1991.

Defert was a member of the scientific committee for human sciences of the International Conference on AIDS (1986–94); member of the World Commission for AIDS (World Health Organization) (1988–93); member of the National Committee for AIDS (1989–98), of the Global AIDS Policy Coalition of Harvard University (1994–1997), and of the French Haut Comité de la Santé Publique (from 1998).

Defert was the author of numerous articles in the domain of ethno-iconography and public health. He was awarded the decoration of Knight of Legion of Honour and received the Alexander Onassis prize for the creation of AIDES in 1998.

== Foucault estate ==
After Foucault's death, Defert inherited his estate despite the fact that their partnership preceded French government recognition of gay couples through civil unions (1999) or marriage (2013) and Foucault left no official will; however Foucault had written a letter indicating his intention to bequeath his apartment and all its contents, which included his archive and corrected proofs for an unpublished manuscript, to Defert. Other family members deferred to Foucault's wishes, but without government recognition, Defert, like other surviving partners in a similar position, was still subject to much higher inheritance taxes than he would have been as a recognized family member.

Defert co-edited, with François Ewald, volume 4 of Dits et Ecrits of Michel Foucault (1994), a posthumous collection of Foucault's writing.

In 2013, Defert sold for €3.8m ($4.0m, May 2022) Foucault's archives to France's national library, making the material available to researchers; subsequently the family, which owns the literary rights, elected to publish the manuscript (Confessions of the Flesh, 2018, the fourth and final volume of Foucault's History of Sexuality), despite Foucault's instruction that no work be published posthumously. Defert explained the decision that after the material became available to researchers with the credentials to acquire a reader card at the national library, Defert and others close to Foucault felt that access should be either available "to everyone or no one". Additionally, many previous posthumous works had already been published, and Defert felt this new addition did not make any encroachment on Foucault's intimate life, but strictly contributed to the corpus of his intellectual contributions; by contrast, the letters exchanged between the two of them, Defert said in 2012, he intended to "take to his grave."

== Death ==
Defert died in Paris on 7 February 2023, at the age of 85.
