= Visibilités =

Philosophical term

Visibilités (French for "visibilities") is a term used by Michel Foucault to designate all that carries meaning other than énoncés/statements.
