= Episteme =

Philosophical term referring to systems of understanding (i.e. knowledge)

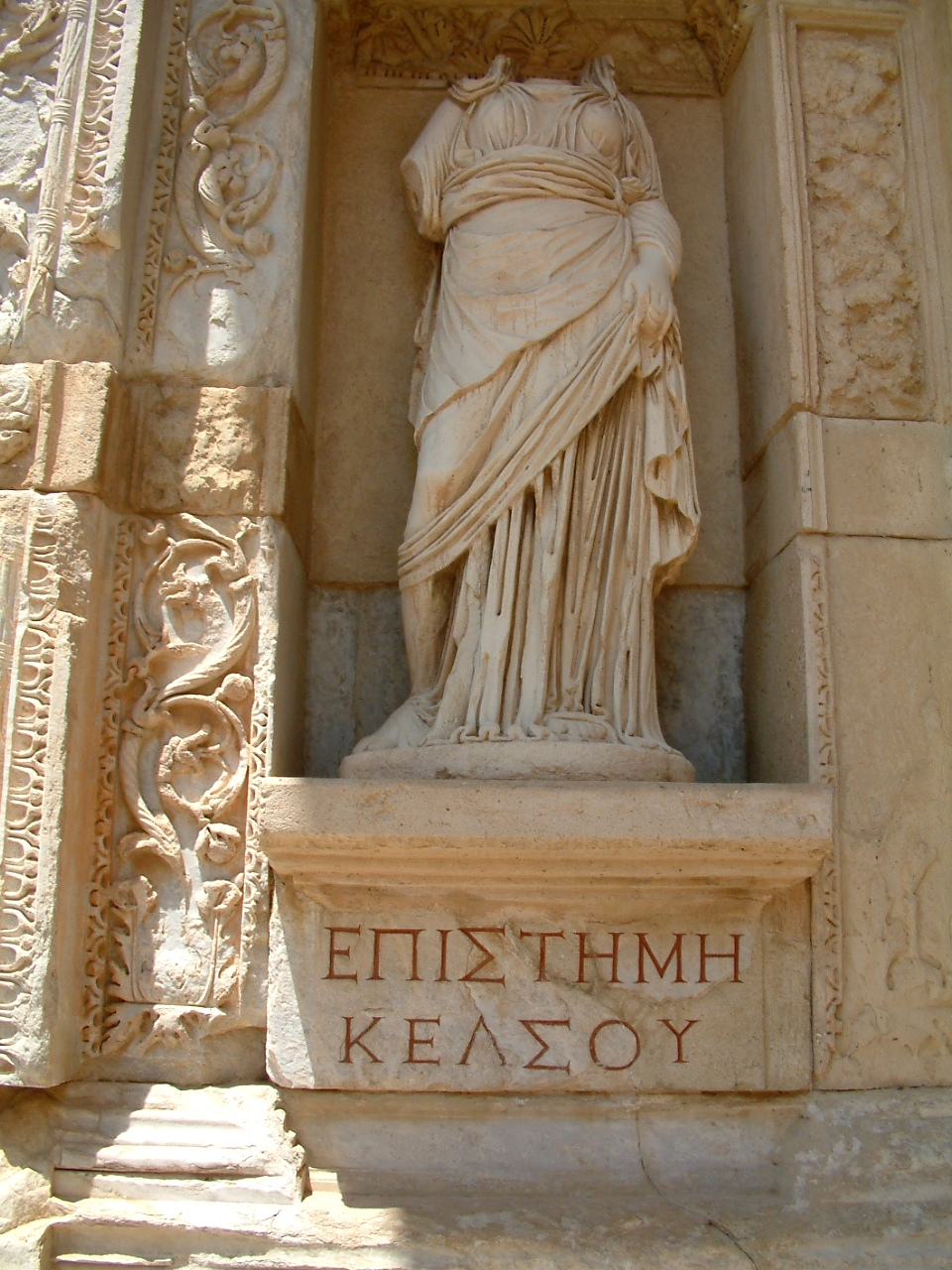
Personification of Episteme in Celsus Library in Ephesus, Turkey (modern copy).

In philosophy, episteme (Ancient Greek: ἐπιστήμη, romanized: epistēmē, lit. 'science, knowledge'; French: épistème) is knowledge or understanding. The term epistemology, a branch of philosophy concerning knowledge, is derived from episteme.

== History ==
=== Plato ===
Plato, following Xenophanes, contrasts episteme with doxa: common belief or opinion. The term episteme is also distinguished from techne: a craft or applied practice. In the Protagoras, Plato's Socrates notes that nous and episteme are prerequisites for prudence (phronesis).

=== Aristotle ===
Aristotle distinguished between five virtues of thought: technê, epistêmê, phronêsis, sophia, and nous, with techne translating as "craft" or "art" and episteme as "knowledge". A full account of epistêmê is given in Posterior Analytics, where Aristotle argues that knowledge of necessary, rather than contingent, truths regarding causation is foundational for episteme. To emphasize the necessity, he uses geometry. Aristotle uses the notion of cause (aitia) in a broader sense than contemporary thought. For example, understanding how geometrical axioms lead to a theorem about properties of triangles counts as understanding the cause of the proven property of the right triangle. As a result, episteme is a virtue of thought that deals with what cannot be otherwise, while techne and phronesis deal with what is contingent.

== Contemporary interpretations ==
=== Michel Foucault ===
For Foucault, an épistémè is the guiding unconsciousness of subjectivity within a given epoch – subjective parameters which form an historical a priori. He uses the term épistémè (French pronunciation: [epistemɛ]) in his The Order of Things, in a specialized sense to mean the historical, non-temporal, a priori knowledge that grounds truth and discourses, thus representing the condition of their possibility within a particular epoch. In the book, Foucault describes épistémè:

In any given culture and at any given moment, there is always only one épistémè that defines the conditions of possibility of all knowledge, whether expressed in a theory or silently invested in a practice.

In his genealogical writings, he makes it clear that several épistémès may co-exist and interact at the same time, being discursive parts of dispositifs. Foucault attempts to demonstrate the constitutive limits of discourse, and in particular, the rules enabling their productivity; however, Foucault maintains that, though ideology may infiltrate and form science, it need not do so: it must be demonstrated how ideology actually forms the science in question; contradictions and lack of objectivity are not an indicator of ideology. Jean Piaget has compared Foucault's use of épistémè with Thomas Kuhn's notion of a paradigm.

In the 1970s, Foucault’s research shifted from archaeological analysis to genealogical investigations. The archaeological method focused on discursive statements and archives (épistémès), whereas the genealogical approach re-centres the problem of the production of knowledge around questions of power and is grounded in an institutional analysis (dispositifs). Foucault introduced dispositifs into his research, notes Judith Revel, to “include institutions and practices, that is, ‘all the non-discursive social aspects.’” As a core concept in this later stage of his research, he uses them to examine how the discursive and material dimensions of power/knowledge are assembled together in a heterogeneous network of instruments, procedures, techniques, and strategies. Examples include his analysis of the "dispositif disciplinaire" in Discipline and Punish and the "dispositif de sexualité" in The History of Sexuality. Foucault clarified this shift from epistemes to dispositifs in “The Confession of the Flesh” 1977 interview, when asked about the meaning of the "dispositif" in his first study on sexuality. Foucault states that “the episteme is a specifically discursive” dispositif, whereas a dispositif is a much broader and more heterogeneous device that consists of “discursive and non-discursive” elements.

== See also ==
- Doxa – Greek word meaning common belief or popular opinion
