= AIDES =

French HIV/AIDS organization

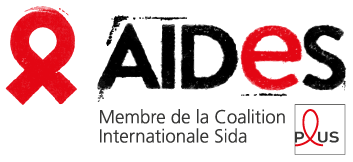

AIDES (Note: Aides means "support" in French, pronounced [ɛd]) is a French community-based non-profit organisation that was founded in 1984 by Daniel Defert, following the death of his partner Michel Foucault from HIV/AIDS. The name is a play on "aides" (French for "help") and the English acronym "AIDS".

Its aim is to bring people living with HIV/AIDS, together with their loved ones and peers, into an organised entity dedicated to fighting HIV/AIDS, and to defend the rights of people and communities affected by the disease.

As of 2007, AIDES is active in France in 100 cities with 400 staff members and more than 1000 registered and trained volunteers. By the number of activists and its budget, it is the largest non-governmental organisation in France working on HIV issues. It is considered to be one of the main analysts of the epidemic in France.

Internationally, AIDES has developed strong partnerships with fellow community-based NGOs in Africa, in Europe and in Canada (Quebec), to strengthen the role of civil society by sharing best practices, and to jointly advocate for global access to care and prevention. It also developed a partnership with the UN Programme on HIV/AIDS.

== Name ==
The name of the organization is a reference to the French noun "aide", from the verb "aider", 'to help or assist'. The founder chose to pluralize the word because it could be said that there are multiple types of help that the association can provide.

== History ==
=== The origins ===
The first signs of the epidemic date back to the late 1970s, when doctors in New York and San Francisco noticed that many of their homosexual patients were suffering from asthenia, weight loss and sometimes even rare and atypical cancer (such as Kaposi's sarcoma). In France, the first article on AIDS appeared in 1982 in the weekly Gai Pied, then in 1983 Liberation devoted its front page to this "gay cancer" and Paris Match published a first account. But the denial is still very strong. The first French association, Vaincre le sida, was created by homosexual activists in 1983. In 1984, the sociologist Daniel Defert, following the death of his companion Michel Foucault, took the initiative to found an association linked to the fight against AIDS.

In January 2021, 15 employees testify in the press about what they have suffered and denounce what they call "a real culture of rape" within the association for the fight against HIV. According to streetpress, the victims remained silent for a long time for fear of harming the fight and the actions carried out by the association.

== Actions by the organization ==
- Male and female condom distribution (about one million in 2005)
- Awareness campaigns on television
- Syringe exchange programs
- Home help
- Publishing of the first French AIDS-related magazine Remaides
- Legal advising to HIV positive people
- Help Free phone line "Sida info service"

One of their video projects is an AIDS awareness cartoon. The cartoon, produced by Goodby, Silverstein and Partners and presented in the style of 1920's era animation, features the comically exaggerated sexual adventures of a cat named "Smutley" and ends with the message, "He has nine lives. You only have one. Protect yourself." Posted on AIDES' YouTube channel on 16 March 2011, it has logged over 1.3 million views as of 3 June 2012.

=== Album Message ===
AIDES released the album Message in February 2010 with the participation of 33 artists covering various songs as well as 15 radio personalities. Collectif Artistes performs "If" credited to Collectif Artistes, namely Daniel Powter, M. Pokora, Caroline Costa, Natasha St. Pier, Justin Nozuka, Sofia Essaidi, Lara Fabian, Anggun, Tom Frager, Christophe Willem, Jenifer, Bob Sinclar, Joachim Garraud. On the other hand, Animateur FM Matinales contribute their comments under the title "No Comment". The album also contains 14 covers of songs by individual artists and one new track "Peace Song" contributed by Bob Sinclar.
