= Michel Foucault =

French philosopher (1926–1984)

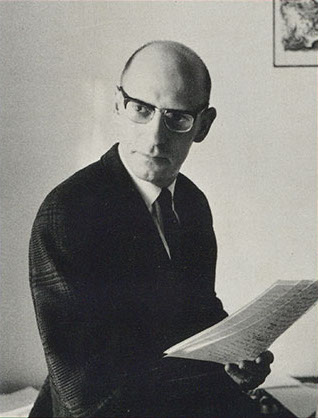
- Foucault, c. 1970
- Born: Paul-Michel Foucault; 15 October 1926; Poitiers, France
- Died: 25 June 1984 (aged 57); Paris, France
- Occupations: Historian of ideas, philosopher, sociologist
- Political party: PCF (1950s)
- Partner: Daniel Defert

Education
- Education: École Normale Supérieure (BA, MA); University of Paris (BA, SpDip, PhD)
- Theses: La constitution d'un transcendantal historique dans la Phénoménologie de l'esprit de Hegel : mémoire du diplôme d'études supérieures de philosophie (1949); Folie et déraison : Histoire de la folie à l'âge classique (1960)
- Doctoral advisor: Georges Canguilhem; Maurice de Gandillac
- Other advisors: Louis Althusser; Jean-Toussaint Desanti; Jean Hyppolite; Maurice Merleau-Ponty

Philosophical work
- Region: Western philosophy
- School: Continental philosophy; French Nietzscheanism; Post-structuralism
- Institutions: École Normale Supérieure (1951–55); Université de Lille (1953–54); Uppsala University; University of Warsaw; Institut français Hamburg; University of Clermont-Ferrand; Tunis University; University of Paris VIII; Collège de France; University at Buffalo; University of California, Berkeley; New York University
- Doctoral students: François Delaporte
- Main interests: Ethics, historical epistemology, history of ideas, philosophy of literature, philosophy of technology, political philosophy
- Notable works: Madness and Civilization (1961); The Birth of the Clinic (1963); The Order of Things (1966); Discipline and Punish (1975); The History of Sexuality (1976)
- Notable ideas: Biopower (biopolitics), disciplinary institution, discourse analysis, discursive formation, dispositif, épistémè, "archaeology", "genealogy", carceral archipelago, governmentality, heterotopia, gaze, limit-experience, power-knowledge, panopticism, subjectivation (assujettissement), parrhesia, epimeleia heautou, visibilités, regimes of truth, Foucault's boomerang, critical ontology, trans-subjectivation

Paul-Michel Foucault, known as Michel Foucault, (UK: /ˈfuːkoʊ/ FOO-koh, US: /fuːˈkoʊ/ foo-KOH; French: [pɔl miʃɛl fuko]; 15 October 1926 – 25 June 1984) was a French philosopher, literary critic, and historian of ideas who analyzed the relationships between power, knowledge, and liberty, and how they are used as a form of social control through institutions. Sometimes called a structuralist or postmodernist, he rejected these labels and sought to critique authority without limiting himself. His thought has influenced academics in many areas of study, including anthropology, communication studies, criminology, cultural studies, feminism, literary theory, psychology, and sociology. His arguments against homophobia, racial prejudice, and other ideological doctrines have also shaped scholarship on critical theory and Marxism.

Born in Poitiers, France, into an upper-middle-class family, Foucault was educated at the Lycée Henri-IV, at the École Normale Supérieure, developing an interest in philosophy and coming under the influence of his tutors Jean Hyppolite and Louis Althusser. At the University of Paris (Sorbonne), he earned degrees in philosophy and psychology. After several years as a cultural diplomat abroad, he returned to France and published his first major book, The History of Madness (1961). While working at the University of Clermont-Ferrand (1960–66), he produced The Birth of the Clinic (1963) and The Order of Things (1966), which have a structuralist affinity from which he later distanced himself. These first three histories exemplified "archeology", a historiographical technique he was developing.

Foucault lectured at the University of Tunis (1966–68), before returning to France, becoming head of the philosophy department at the new experimental university of Paris VIII, and publishing The Archaeology of Knowledge (1969). He was admitted to the Collège de France (1970), a membership he retained until his death. He also became active in several left-wing groups involved in anti-racist human rights campaigns, including penal reform. He later published Discipline and Punish (1975) and The History of Sexuality (1976), developing archaeological and genealogical methods that emphasize the role power plays in society.

Foucault died in Paris from complications of HIV/AIDS. He became the first public figure in France to die from complications of the disease, with his charisma and career influence changing mass awareness of the pandemic and influencing HIV/AIDS activism. His partner, Daniel Defert, founded the AIDES charity in his memory.

== Early life ==
=== Early years: 1926–1938 ===
Paul-Michel Foucault was born on 15 October 1926 in the city of Poitiers, west-central France, as the second of three children in a prosperous, socially conservative, upper-middle-class family. Family tradition prescribed naming him after his father, Paul Foucault (1893–1959), but his mother insisted on the addition of Michel; referred to as Paul at school, he expressed a preference for "Michel" throughout his life.

His father, a successful local surgeon born in Fontainebleau, moved to Poitiers, where he set up his own practice. He married Anne Malapert, the daughter of prosperous surgeon Prosper Malapert, who owned a private practice and taught anatomy at the University of Poitiers' School of Medicine. Paul Foucault eventually took over his father-in-law's medical practice, while Anne took charge of their large mid-19th-century house, Le Piroir, in the village of Vendeuvre-du-Poitou. Together the couple had three children—a girl named Francine and two boys, Paul-Michel and Denys—who all shared the same fair hair and bright blue eyes. The children were raised to be nominal Catholics, attending mass at the Church of Saint-Porchaire, and while Michel briefly became an altar boy, none of the family was devout.

In later life, Foucault revealed very little about his childhood. Describing himself as a "juvenile delinquent", he said his father was a "bully" who sternly punished him. In 1930, two years early, Foucault began his schooling at the local Lycée Henry-IV. There he undertook two years of elementary education before entering the main lycée, where he stayed until 1936. Afterwards, he took his first four years of secondary education at the same establishment, excelling in French, Greek, Latin, and history, though doing poorly at mathematics, including arithmetic.

=== Teens to young adulthood: 1939–1945 ===
In 1939, the Second World War began, followed by Nazi Germany's occupation of France in 1940. Foucault's parents opposed the occupation and the Vichy regime, but did not join the Resistance. That year, Foucault's mother enrolled him in the Collège Saint-Stanislas, a strict Catholic institution run by the Jesuits. Although he later described his years there as an "ordeal", Foucault excelled academically, particularly in philosophy, history, and literature. In 1942, he entered his final year, the terminale, where he focused on the study of philosophy, earning his baccalauréat in 1943.

Returning to the local Lycée Henry-IV, he studied history and philosophy for a year, aided by a personal tutor, the philosopher Louis Girard. Rejecting his father's wishes that he become a surgeon, in 1945 Foucault went to Paris, where he enrolled in one of the country's most prestigious secondary schools, which was also known as the Lycée Henri-IV. Here he studied under the philosopher Jean Hyppolite, an existentialist and expert on the work of 19th-century German philosopher Georg Wilhelm Friedrich Hegel. Hyppolite had devoted himself to uniting existentialist theories with the dialectical theories of Hegel and Karl Marx. These ideas influenced Foucault, who adopted Hyppolite's conviction that philosophy must develop through a study of history.

=== University studies: 1946–1951 ===
I wasn't always smart, I was actually very stupid in school. ... [T]here was a boy who was very attractive who was even stupider than I was. And to ingratiate myself with this boy who was very beautiful, I began to do his homework for him—and that's how I became smart, I had to do all this work to just keep ahead of him a little bit, to help him. In a sense, all the rest of my life I've been trying to do intellectual things that would attract beautiful boys.

— Michel Foucault, 1983

In autumn 1946, attaining excellent results, Foucault was admitted to the élite École Normale Supérieure (ENS), for which he undertook exams and an oral interrogation by Georges Canguilhem and Pierre-Maxime Schuhl to gain entry. Of the hundred students entering the ENS, Foucault ranked fourth based on his entry results, and encountered the highly competitive nature of the institution. Like most of his classmates, he lived in the school's communal dormitories on the Parisian Rue d'Ulm.

He remained largely unpopular, spending much time alone, reading voraciously. His fellow students noted his love of violence and the macabre; he decorated his bedroom with images of torture and war drawn during the Napoleonic Wars by Spanish artist Francisco Goya, and on one occasion chased a classmate with a dagger. Prone to self-harm, Foucault allegedly attempted suicide in 1948; his father sent him to see the psychiatrist Jean Delay at the Sainte-Anne Hospital Center. Obsessed with the idea of self-mutilation and suicide, Foucault attempted the latter several times in ensuing years, praising suicide in later writings. The ENS's doctor examined Foucault's state of mind, suggesting that his suicidal tendencies emerged from the distress surrounding his homosexuality, because same-sex sexual activity was socially taboo in France. At the time, Foucault engaged in homosexual activity with men whom he encountered in the underground Parisian gay scene, also indulging in drug use; according to biographer James Miller, he enjoyed the thrill and sense of danger that these activities offered him.

Although studying various subjects, Foucault soon gravitated towards philosophy, reading not only Hegel and Marx but also Immanuel Kant, Edmund Husserl and most significantly, Martin Heidegger. He began reading the publications of philosopher Gaston Bachelard, taking a particular interest in his work exploring the history of science. He graduated from the ENS with a B.A. (licence) in Philosophy in 1948 and a Diplôme d'études supérieures (DES), roughly equivalent to an M.A. degree, in Philosophy in 1949. His DES thesis under the direction of Hyppolite was titled La Constitution d'un transcendental dans La Phénoménologie de l'esprit de Hegel (The Constitution of a Historical Transcendental in Hegel's Phenomenology of Spirit).

In 1948, the philosopher Louis Althusser became a tutor at the ENS. A Marxist, he influenced both Foucault and a number of other students, encouraging them to join the French Communist Party. Foucault did so in 1950, but never became particularly active in its activities, and never adopted an orthodox Marxist viewpoint, rejecting core Marxist tenets such as class struggle. He soon became dissatisfied with the bigotry that he experienced within the party's ranks; he personally faced homophobia and was appalled by the antisemitism exhibited during the 1952–53 "doctors' plot" in the Soviet Union. He left the Communist Party in 1953, but remained Althusser's friend and defender for the rest of his life. Although failing at the first attempt in 1950, he passed his agrégation in philosophy on the second try, in 1951. Excused from national service on medical grounds, he decided to start a doctorate at the Fondation Thiers in 1951, focusing on the philosophy of psychology, but he relinquished it after only one year in 1952.

Foucault was also interested in psychology and he attended Daniel Lagache's lectures at the University of Paris, where he obtained a B.A. (licence) in psychology in 1949 and a Specialist Diploma in Psychopathology (Diplôme de psychopathologie) from the university's institute of psychology (now called the Institut de psychologie de l'université Paris Descartes) in June 1952.

== Early career (1951–1960) ==
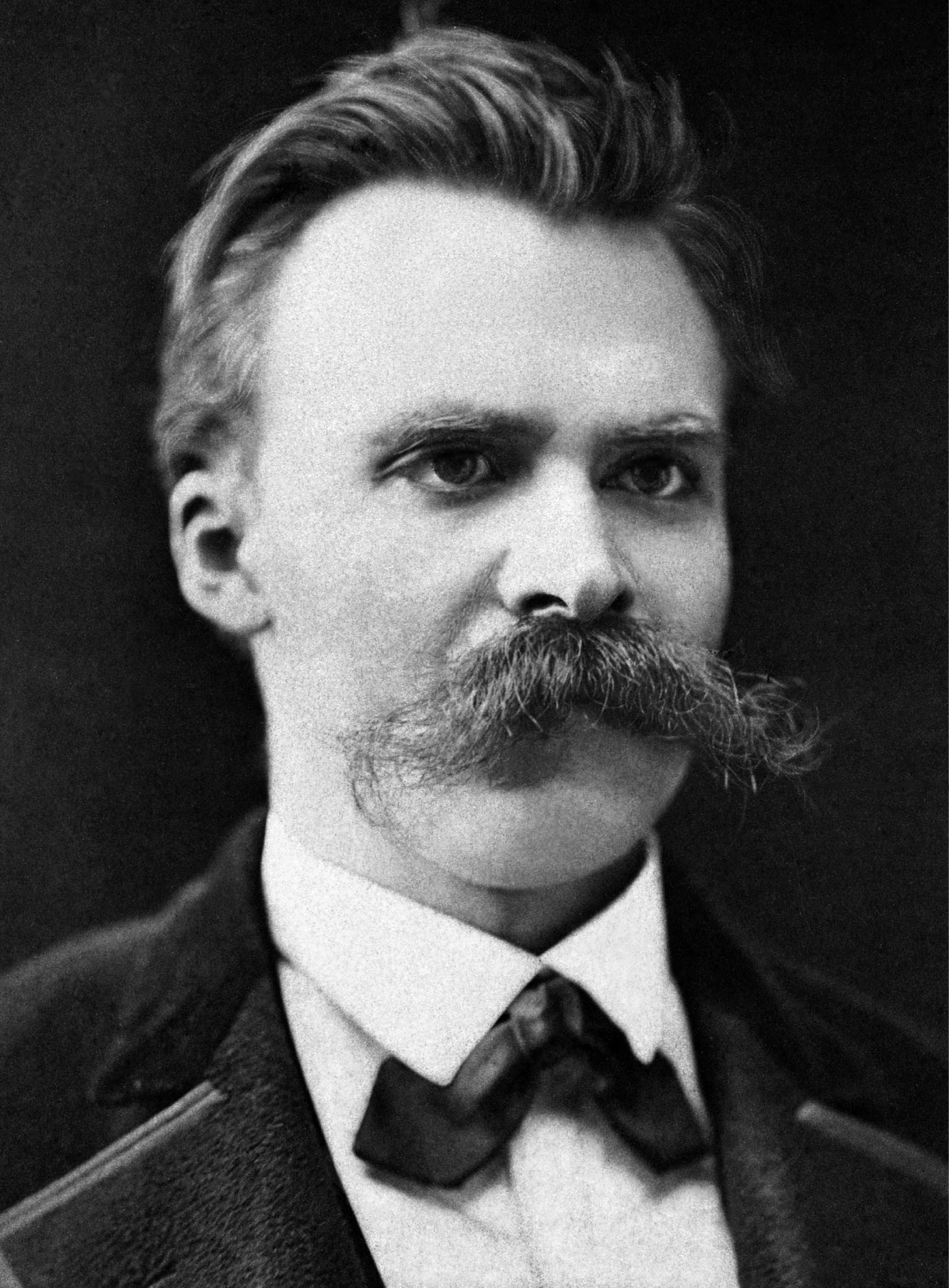
In the early 1950s, Foucault came under the influence of German philosopher Friedrich Nietzsche, who remained a core influence on his work throughout his life.

=== France: 1951–1955 ===
Over the following few years, Foucault embarked on a variety of research and teaching jobs. From 1951 to 1955, he worked as a psychology instructor at the ENS at Althusser's invitation. In Paris, he shared a flat with his brother, who was training to become a surgeon, but for three days in the week commuted to the northern town of Lille, teaching psychology at the Université de Lille from 1953 to 1954. Many of his students liked his lecturing style. Meanwhile, he continued working on his thesis, visiting the Bibliothèque Nationale every day to read the work of psychologists such as Ivan Pavlov, Jean Piaget and Karl Jaspers. Undertaking research at the psychiatric institute of the Sainte-Anne Hospital, he became an unofficial intern, studying the relationship between doctor and patient and aiding experiments in the electroencephalographic laboratory. Foucault adopted many of the theories of the psychoanalyst Sigmund Freud, undertaking psychoanalytical interpretation of his dreams and making friends undergo Rorschach tests.

Embracing the Parisian avant-garde, Foucault entered into a romantic relationship with the serialist composer Jean Barraqué. Together, they tried to produce their greatest work, heavily used recreational drugs and engaged in sado-masochistic sexual activity. In August 1953, Foucault and Barraqué holidayed in Italy, where the philosopher immersed himself in Untimely Meditations (1873–1876), a set of four essays by the philosopher Friedrich Nietzsche. Later describing Nietzsche's work as "a revelation", he felt that reading the book deeply affected him, being a watershed moment in his life. Foucault subsequently experienced another groundbreaking self-revelation when watching a Parisian performance of Samuel Beckett's new play, Waiting for Godot, in 1953.

Interested in literature, Foucault was an avid reader of the philosopher Maurice Blanchot's book reviews published in Nouvelle Revue Française. Enamoured of Blanchot's literary style and critical theories, in later works he adopted Blanchot's technique of "interviewing" himself. Foucault also came across Hermann Broch's 1945 novel The Death of Virgil, a work that obsessed both him and Barraqué. While the latter attempted to convert the work into an epic opera, Foucault admired Broch's text for its portrayal of death as an affirmation of life. The couple took a mutual interest in the work of such authors as the Marquis de Sade, Fyodor Dostoyevsky, Franz Kafka and Jean Genet, all of whose works explored the themes of sex and violence.

I belong to that generation who, as students, had before their eyes, and were limited by, a horizon consisting of Marxism, phenomenology and existentialism. For me the break was first Beckett's Waiting for Godot, a breathtaking performance.

— Michel Foucault, 1983

Interested in the work of Swiss psychologist Ludwig Binswanger, Foucault aided family friend Jacqueline Verdeaux in translating his works into French. Foucault was particularly interested in Binswanger's studies of Ellen West who, like himself, had a deep obsession with suicide, eventually killing herself. In 1954, Foucault authored an introduction to Binswanger's paper "Dream and Existence", in which he argued that dreams constituted "the birth of the world" or "the heart laid bare", expressing the mind's deepest desires. That same year, Foucault published his first book, Maladie mentale et personalité (Mental Illness and Personality), in which he exhibited his influence from both Marxist and Heideggerian thought, covering a wide range of subject matter from the reflex psychology of Pavlov to the classic psychoanalysis of Freud. Referencing the work of sociologists and anthropologists such as Émile Durkheim and Margaret Mead, he presented his theory that illness was culturally relative. Biographer James Miller noted that while the book exhibited "erudition and evident intelligence", it lacked the "kind of fire and flair" that Foucault exhibited in subsequent works. It was largely critically ignored, receiving only one review at the time. Foucault grew to despise it, unsuccessfully attempting to prevent its republication and translation into English.

=== Sweden, Poland, and West Germany: 1955–1960 ===
Foucault spent the next five years abroad, first in Sweden, working as cultural diplomat at the University of Uppsala, a job obtained through his acquaintance with historian of religion Georges Dumézil. At Uppsala, he was appointed a Reader in French language and literature, while simultaneously working as director of the Maison de France, thus opening the possibility of a cultural-diplomatic career. Although finding it difficult to adjust to the "Nordic gloom" and long winters, he developed close friendships with two Frenchmen, biochemist Jean-François Miquel and physicist Jacques Papet-Lépine, and entered into romantic and sexual relationships with various men. In Uppsala he became known for his heavy alcohol consumption and reckless driving in his new Jaguar car. In spring 1956, Barraqué broke from his relationship with Foucault, announcing that he wanted to leave the "vertigo of madness". In Uppsala, Foucault spent much of his spare time in the university's Carolina Rediviva library, making use of their Bibliotheca Walleriana collection of texts on the history of medicine for his ongoing research. Finishing his doctoral thesis, Foucault hoped that Uppsala University would accept it, but Sten Lindroth, a positivistic historian of science there, remained unimpressed, asserting that it was full of speculative generalisations and was a poor work of history; he refused to allow Foucault to be awarded a doctorate at Uppsala. In part because of this rejection, Foucault left Sweden. Later, Foucault admitted that the work was a first draft with certain lack of quality.

Again at Dumézil's behest, in October 1958 Foucault arrived in Warsaw, the capital of the Polish People's Republic, and took charge of the University of Warsaw's Centre Français. Foucault found life in Poland difficult due to the lack of material goods and services following the destruction of the Second World War. Witnessing the aftermath of the Polish October of 1956, when students had protested against the governing communist Polish United Workers' Party, he felt that most Poles despised their government as a puppet regime of the Soviet Union, and thought that the system ran "badly". Considering the university a liberal enclave, he traveled the country giving lectures; proving popular, he adopted the position of de facto cultural attaché. Like France and Sweden, Poland legally tolerated but socially frowned on homosexual activity, and Foucault undertook relationships with a number of men; one was with a Polish security agent who hoped to trap Foucault in an embarrassing situation, which therefore would reflect badly on the French embassy. Wracked in diplomatic scandal, he was ordered to leave Poland for a new destination. Various positions were available in West Germany, and so Foucault relocated to the Institut français Hamburg (where he served as director in 1958–1960), teaching the same courses he had given in Uppsala and Warsaw. Spending much time in the Reeperbahn red-light district, he entered into a relationship with a transvestite.

== Growing career (1960–1970) ==
=== Madness and Civilization: 1960 ===
Histoire de la folie is not an easy text to read, and it defies attempts to summarise its contents. Foucault refers to a bewildering variety of sources, ranging from well-known authors such as Erasmus and Molière to archival documents and forgotten figures in the history of medicine and psychiatry. His erudition derives from years pondering, to cite Poe, 'over many a quaint and curious volume of forgotten lore', and his learning is not always worn lightly.

— Foucault biographer David Macey, 1993

In West Germany, Foucault completed in 1960 his primary thesis (thèse principale) for his State doctorate, titled Folie et déraison : Histoire de la folie à l'âge classique (trans. "Madness and Insanity: History of Madness in the Classical Age"), a philosophical work based upon his studies into the history of medicine. The book discussed how West European society had dealt with madness, arguing that it was a social construct distinct from mental illness. Foucault traces the evolution of the concept of madness through three phases: the Renaissance, the later 17th and 18th centuries, and the modern experience. The work alludes to the work of French poet and playwright Antonin Artaud, who exerted a strong influence over Foucault's thought at the time.

Histoire de la folie was an expansive work, consisting of 943 pages of text, followed by appendices and a bibliography. Foucault submitted it at the University of Paris, although the university's regulations for awarding a State doctorate required the submission of both his main thesis and a shorter complementary thesis. Obtaining a doctorate in France at the period was a multi-step process. The first step was to obtain a rapporteur, or "sponsor" for the work: Foucault chose Georges Canguilhem. The second was to find a publisher, and as a result Folie et déraison was published in French in May 1961 by the company Plon, whom Foucault chose over Presses Universitaires de France after being rejected by Gallimard. In 1964, a heavily abridged version was published as a mass market paperback, then translated into English for publication the following year as Madness and Civilization: A History of Insanity in the Age of Reason.

Folie et déraison received a mixed reception in France and in foreign journals focusing on French affairs. Although it was critically acclaimed by Maurice Blanchot, Michel Serres, Roland Barthes, Gaston Bachelard, and Fernand Braudel, it was largely ignored by the leftist press, much to Foucault's disappointment. It was notably criticised for advocating metaphysics by young philosopher Jacques Derrida in a March 1963 lecture at the University of Paris. Responding with a vicious retort, Foucault criticised Derrida's interpretation of René Descartes. The two remained bitter rivals until reconciling in 1981. In the English-speaking world, the work became a significant influence on the anti-psychiatry movement during the 1960s; Foucault took a mixed approach to this, associating with a number of anti-psychiatrists but arguing that most of them misunderstood his work.

Foucault's secondary thesis (thèse complémentaire), written in Hamburg between 1959 and 1960, was a translation and commentary on German philosopher Immanuel Kant's Anthropology from a Pragmatic Point of View (1798); the thesis was titled Introduction à l'Anthropologie. Largely consisting of Foucault's discussion of textual dating—an "archaeology of the Kantian text"—he rounded off the thesis with an evocation of Nietzsche, his biggest philosophical influence. This work's rapporteur was Foucault's old tutor and then-director of the ENS, Hyppolite, who was well acquainted with German philosophy. After both theses were championed and reviewed, he underwent his public defense of his doctoral thesis (soutenance de thèse) on 20 May 1961. The academics responsible for reviewing his work were concerned about the unconventional nature of his major thesis; reviewer Henri Gouhier noted that it was not a conventional work of history, making sweeping generalisations without sufficient particular argument, and that Foucault clearly "thinks in allegories". They all agreed however that the overall project was of merit, awarding Foucault his doctorate "despite reservations".

=== University of Clermont-Ferrand, The Birth of the Clinic, and The Order of Things: 1960–1966 ===
In October 1960, Foucault took a tenured post in philosophy at the University of Clermont-Ferrand, commuting to the city every week from Paris, where he lived in a high-rise block on the rue du Dr Finlay. Responsible for teaching psychology, which was subsumed within the philosophy department, he was considered a "fascinating" but "rather traditional" teacher at Clermont. The department was run by Jules Vuillemin, who soon developed a friendship with Foucault. Foucault then took Vuillemin's job when the latter was elected to the Collège de France in 1962. In this position, Foucault took a dislike to another staff member whom he considered stupid: Roger Garaudy, a senior figure in the Communist Party. Foucault made life at the university difficult for Garaudy, leading the latter to transfer to Poitiers. Foucault also caused controversy by securing a university job for his lover, the philosopher Daniel Defert, with whom he retained a non-monogamous relationship for the rest of his life.

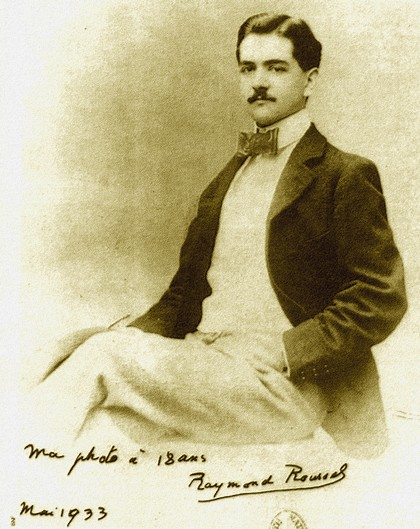
Foucault adored the work of Raymond Roussel and wrote a literary study of it.

Foucault maintained a keen interest in literature, publishing reviews in literary journals, including Tel Quel and Nouvelle Revue Française, and sitting on the editorial board of Critique. In May 1963, he published a book devoted to poet, novelist, and playwright Raymond Roussel. It was written in under two months, published by Gallimard, and was described by biographer David Macey as "a very personal book" that resulted from a "love affair" with Roussel's work. It was published in English in 1983 as Death and the Labyrinth: The World of Raymond Roussel. Receiving few reviews, it was largely ignored. That same year he published a sequel to Folie et déraison, titled Naissance de la Clinique, subsequently translated as The Birth of the Clinic: An Archaeology of Medical Perception. Shorter than its predecessor, it focused on the changes that the medical establishment underwent in the late 18th and early 19th centuries. Like his preceding work, Naissance de la Clinique was largely critically ignored, but later gained a cult following. It was of interest within the field of medical ethics, as it considered the ways in which the history of medicine and hospitals, and the training that those working within them receive, bring about a particular way of looking at the body: the 'medical gaze'. Foucault was also selected to be among the "Eighteen Man Commission" that assembled between November 1963 and March 1964 to discuss university reforms that were to be implemented by Christian Fouchet, the Gaullist Minister of National Education. Implemented in 1967, they brought staff strikes and student protests.

In April 1966, Gallimard published Foucault's Les Mots et les choses (Words and Things), later translated as The Order of Things: An Archaeology of the Human Sciences. Exploring how man came to be an object of knowledge, it argued that all periods of history have possessed certain underlying conditions of truth that constituted what was acceptable as scientific discourse. Foucault argues that these conditions of discourse have changed over time, from one period's épistémè to another. Although designed for a specialist audience, the work gained media attention, becoming a surprise bestseller in France. Appearing at the height of interest in structuralism, Foucault was quickly grouped with scholars such as Jacques Lacan, Claude Lévi-Strauss, and Roland Barthes, as the latest wave of thinkers set to topple the existentialism popularized by Jean-Paul Sartre. Although initially accepting this description, Foucault soon vehemently rejected it, because he "never posited a universal theory of discourse, but rather sought to describe the historical forms taken by discoursive practices". Foucault and Sartre regularly criticised one another in the press. Both Sartre and Simone de Beauvoir attacked Foucault's ideas as "bourgeois", while Foucault retaliated against their Marxist beliefs by proclaiming that "Marxism exists in nineteenth-century thought as a fish exists in water; that is, it ceases to breathe anywhere else."

=== University of Tunis and Vincennes: 1966–1970 ===
I lived [in Tunisia] for two and a half years. It made a real impression. I was present for large, violent student riots that preceded by several weeks what happened in May in France. This was March 1968. The unrest lasted a whole year: strikes, courses suspended, arrests. And in March, a general strike by the students. The police came into the university, beat up the students, wounded several of them seriously, and started making arrests ... I have to say that I was tremendously impressed by those young men and women who took terrible risks by writing or distributing tracts or calling for strikes, the ones who really risked losing their freedom! It was a political experience for me.

— Michel Foucault, 1983

In September 1966, Foucault took a position teaching psychology at the University of Tunis in Tunisia. His decision to do so was largely because his lover, Defert, had been posted to the country as part of his national service. Foucault moved a few kilometres from Tunis, to the village of Sidi Bou Saïd, where fellow academic Gérard Deledalle lived with his wife. Soon after his arrival, Foucault announced that Tunisia was "blessed by history", a nation which "deserves to live forever because it was where Hannibal and St. Augustine lived". His lectures at the university proved very popular, and were well attended. Although many young students were enthusiastic about his teaching, they were critical of what they believed to be his right-wing political views, viewing him as a "representative of Gaullist technocracy", even though he considered himself a leftist.

Foucault was in Tunis during the anti-government and pro-Palestinian riots that rocked the city in June 1967, and which continued for a year. Although highly critical of the violent, ultra-nationalistic and anti-semitic nature of many protesters, he used his status to try to prevent some of his militant leftist students from being arrested and tortured for their role in the agitation. He hid their printing press in his garden, and tried to testify on their behalf at their trials, but was prevented when the trials became closed-door events. While in Tunis, Foucault continued to write. Inspired by a correspondence with the surrealist artist René Magritte, Foucault started to write a book about the impressionist artist Édouard Manet, but never completed it.

In 1968, Foucault returned to Paris, moving into an apartment on the Rue de Vaugirard. After the May 1968 student protests, Minister of Education Edgar Faure responded by founding new universities with greater autonomy. Most prominent of these was the Centre Expérimental de Vincennes in Vincennes on the outskirts of Paris. A group of prominent academics were asked to select teachers to run the centre's departments, and Canguilheim recommended Foucault as head of the Philosophy Department. Becoming a tenured professor of Vincennes, Foucault's desire was to obtain "the best in French philosophy today" for his department, employing Michel Serres, Judith Miller, Alain Badiou, Jacques Rancière, François Regnault, Henri Weber, Étienne Balibar, and François Châtelet; most of them were Marxists or ultra-left activists.

Lectures began at the university in January 1969, and straight away its students and staff, including Foucault, were involved in occupations and clashes with police, resulting in arrests. In February, Foucault gave a speech denouncing police provocation to protesters at the Maison de la Mutualité. Such actions marked Foucault's embrace of the ultra-left, undoubtedly influenced by Defert, who had gained a job at Vincennes' sociology department and who had become a Maoist. Most of the courses at Foucault's philosophy department were Marxist oriented, although Foucault himself gave courses on Nietzsche, "The end of Metaphysics", and "The Discourse of Sexuality", which were highly popular and over-subscribed. While the right-wing press was heavily critical of this new institution, new Minister of Education Olivier Guichard was angered by its ideological bent and the lack of exams, with students being awarded degrees in a haphazard manner. He refused national accreditation of the department's degrees, resulting in a public rebuttal from Foucault.

== Later life (1970–1984) ==
=== Collège de France and Discipline and Punish: 1970–1975 ===
Foucault desired to leave Vincennes and become a fellow of the prestigious Collège de France. He requested to join, taking up a chair in what he called the "history of systems of thought", and his request was championed by members Dumézil, Hyppolite, and Vuillemin. In November 1969, when an opening became available, Foucault was elected to the Collège, though with opposition by a large minority. He gave his inaugural lecture in December 1970, which was subsequently published as L'Ordre du discours (The Discourse of Language). He was obliged to give 12 weekly lectures a year—and did so for the rest of his life—covering the topics that he was researching at the time; these became "one of the events of Parisian intellectual life" and were repeatedly packed out events. On Mondays, he also gave seminars to a group of students; many of them became a "Foulcauldian tribe" who worked with him on his research. He enjoyed this teamwork and collective research, and together they published a number of short books. Working at the Collège allowed him to travel widely, giving lectures in Brazil, Japan, Canada, and the United States over the next 14 years. In 1970 and 1972, Foucault served as a professor in the French Department of the University at Buffalo in Buffalo, New York.

In February 1971, Foucault co-founded the Groupe d'Information sur les Prisons (GIP) along with historian Pierre Vidal-Naquet and journalist Jean-Marie Domenach. The GIP aimed to investigate and expose poor conditions in prisons and give prisoners and ex-prisoners a voice in French society. It was highly critical of the penal system, believing that it converted petty criminals into hardened delinquents. The GIP gave press conferences and staged protests surrounding the events of the Toul prison riot in December 1971, alongside other prison riots that it sparked off; in doing so it faced a police crackdown and repeated arrests. The group became active across France, with 2,000 to 3,000, members, but disbanded in December 1972. Also campaigning against the death penalty, Foucault co-authored a short book on the case of the convicted murderer Pierre Rivière. After his research into the penal system, Foucault published Surveiller et punir: Naissance de la prison (Discipline and Punish: The Birth of the Prison) in 1975, offering a history of the system in western Europe. In it, Foucault examines the penal evolution away from corporal and capital punishment to the penitentiary system that began in Europe and the United States around the end of the 18th century. Biographer Didier Eribon described it as "perhaps the finest" of Foucault's works, and it was well received.

Foucault was also active in anti-racist campaigns; in November 1971, he was a leading figure in protests following the perceived racist killing of Arab migrant Djellali Ben Ali. In this he worked alongside his old rival Sartre, the journalist Claude Mauriac, and one of his literary heroes, Jean Genet. This campaign was formalised as the Committee for the Defence of the Rights of Immigrants, but there was tension at their meetings as Foucault opposed the anti-Israeli sentiment of many Arab workers and Maoist activists. At a December 1972 protest against the police killing of Algerian worker Mohammad Diab, both Foucault and Genet were arrested, resulting in widespread publicity. Foucault was also involved in founding the Agence de Press-Libération (APL), a group of leftist journalists who intended to cover news stories neglected by the mainstream press. In 1973, they established the daily newspaper Libération, and Foucault suggested that they establish committees across France to collect news and distribute the paper, and advocated a column known as the "Chronicle of the Workers' Memory" to allow workers to express their opinions. Foucault wanted an active journalistic role in the paper, but this proved untenable, and he soon became disillusioned with Libération, believing that it distorted the facts; he did not publish in it until 1980.

In 1975, he had an LSD experience with Simeon Wade and Michael Stoneman in Death Valley, California, and later wrote "it was the greatest experience of his life, and that it profoundly changed his life and his work". In front of Zabriskie Point they took LSD while listening to a well-prepared music program: Richard Strauss's Four Last Songs, followed by Charles Ives's Three Places in New England, ending with a few avant-garde pieces by Stockhausen. According to Wade, as soon as he came back to Paris, Foucault scrapped the second The History of Sexuality's manuscript, and totally rethought the whole project.

=== The History of Sexuality and Iranian Revolution: 1976–1979 ===
In 1976, Gallimard published Foucault's Histoire de la sexualité: la volonté de savoir (The History of Sexuality: The Will to Knowledge), a short book exploring what Foucault called the "repressive hypothesis". It revolved largely around the concept of power, rejecting both Marxist and Freudian theory. Foucault intended it as the first in a seven-volume exploration of the subject. Histoire de la sexualité was a best-seller in France and gained positive press, but lukewarm intellectual interest, something that upset Foucault, who felt that many misunderstood his hypothesis. He soon became dissatisfied with Gallimard after being offended by senior staff member Pierre Nora. Along with Paul Veyne and François Wahl, Foucault launched a new series of academic books, known as Des travaux (Some Works), through the company Seuil, which he hoped would improve the state of academic research in France. He also produced introductions for the memoirs of Herculine Barbin and My Secret Life.

Foucault's Histoire de la sexualité concentrates on the relation between truth and sex. He defines truth as a system of ordered procedures for the production, distribution, regulation, circulation, and operation of statements. Through this system of truth, power structures are created and enforced. Though Foucault's definition of truth may differ from other sociologists before and after him, his work with truth in relation to power structures, such as sexuality, has left a profound mark on social science theory. In his work, he examines the heightened curiosity regarding sexuality that induced a "world of perversion" during the elite, capitalist 18th and 19th century in the western world. According to Foucault in History of Sexuality, society of the modern age is symbolized by the conception of sexual discourses and their union with the system of truth. In the "world of perversion", including extramarital affairs, homosexual behavior, and other such sexual promiscuities, Foucault concludes that sexual relations of the kind are constructed around producing the truth. Sex became not only a means of pleasure, but an issue of truth. Sex is what confines one to darkness, but also what brings one to light.

Similarly, in The History of Sexuality, society validates and approves people based on how closely they fit the discursive mold of sexual truth. As Foucault reminds us, in the 18th and 19th centuries, the Church was the epitome of power structure within society. Thus, many aligned their personal virtues with those of the Church, further internalizing their beliefs on the meaning of sex. However, those who unify their sexual relation to the truth become decreasingly obliged to share their internal views with those of the Church. They will no longer see the arrangement of societal norms as an effect of the Church's deep-seated power structure.

There exists an international citizenry that has its rights, and has its duties, and that is committed to rise up against every abuse of power, no matter who the author, no matter who the victims. After all, we are all ruled, and as such, we are in solidarity.

— Michel Foucault, 1981

Foucault remained a political activist, focusing on protesting government abuses of human rights around the world. He was a key player in the 1975 protests against the Spanish government who were set to execute 11 militants sentenced to death without fair trial. It was his idea to travel to Madrid with six others to give a press conference there; they were subsequently arrested and deported back to Paris. In 1977, he protested the extradition of Klaus Croissant to West Germany, and his rib was fractured during clashes with riot police. In July that year, he organised an assembly of Eastern Bloc dissidents to mark the visit of Soviet general secretary Leonid Brezhnev to Paris. In 1979, he campaigned for Vietnamese political dissidents to be granted asylum in France.

In 1977, Italian newspaper Corriere della sera asked Foucault to write a column for them. In doing so, in 1978 he travelled to Tehran in Iran, days after the Black Friday massacre. Documenting the developing Iranian Revolution, he met with opposition leaders such as Mohammad Kazem Shariatmadari and Mehdi Bazargan, and discovered the popular support for Islamism. Returning to France, he was one of the journalists who visited the Ayatollah Khomeini, before visiting Tehran. His articles expressed awe of Khomeini's Islamist movement, for which he was widely criticised in the French press, including by Iranian expatriates. Foucault's response was that Islamism was to become a major political force in the region, and that the West must treat it with respect rather than hostility. In April 1978, Foucault traveled to Japan, where he studied Zen Buddhism under Omori Sogen at the Seionji temple in Uenohara.

=== Final years: 1980–1984 ===
Although remaining critical of power relations, Foucault expressed cautious support for the Socialist Party government of François Mitterrand following its electoral victory in 1981. But his support soon deteriorated when that party refused to condemn the Polish government's crackdown on the 1982 demonstrations in Poland orchestrated by the Solidarity trade union. He and sociologist Pierre Bourdieu authored a document condemning Mitterrand's inaction that was published in Libération, and they also took part in large public protests on the issue. Foucault continued to support Solidarity, and with his friend Simone Signoret traveled to Poland as part of a Médecins du Monde expedition, taking time out to visit the Auschwitz concentration camp. He continued his academic research, and in June 1984 Gallimard published the second and third volumes of Histoire de la sexualité. Volume two, L'Usage des plaisirs, dealt with the "techniques of self" prescribed by ancient Greek pagan morality in relation to sexual ethics, while volume three, Le Souci de soi, explored the same theme in the Greek and Latin texts of the first two centuries CE. A fourth volume, Les Aveux de la chair, was to examine sexuality in early Christianity, but it was not finished.

In October 1980, Foucault became a visiting professor at the University of California, Berkeley, giving the Howison Lectures on "Truth and Subjectivity", while in November he lectured at the Humanities Institute at New York University. His growing popularity in American intellectual circles was noted by Time magazine, while Foucault went on to lecture at University of California, Los Angeles in 1981, the University of Vermont in 1982, and Berkeley again in 1983, where his lectures drew huge crowds. Foucault spent many evenings in the San Francisco gay scene, frequenting sado-masochistic bathhouses, engaging in unprotected sex. He praised sado-masochistic activity in interviews with the gay press, describing it as "the real creation of new possibilities of pleasure, which people had no idea about previously". Foucault contracted HIV and eventually developed AIDS. Little was known of the virus at the time; the first cases had only been identified in 1980. Foucault initially referred to AIDS as a "dreamed-up disease". In summer 1983, he developed a persistent dry cough, which concerned friends in Paris, but Foucault insisted it was just a pulmonary infection. Only when hospitalized was Foucault correctly diagnosed as being HIV-positive; treated with antibiotics, he delivered a final set of lectures at the Collège de France. Foucault entered Paris' Hôpital de la Salpêtrière—the same institution that he had studied in Madness and Civilisation—on 10 June 1984, with neurological symptoms complicated by sepsis. He died in the hospital on 25 June.

== Death ==
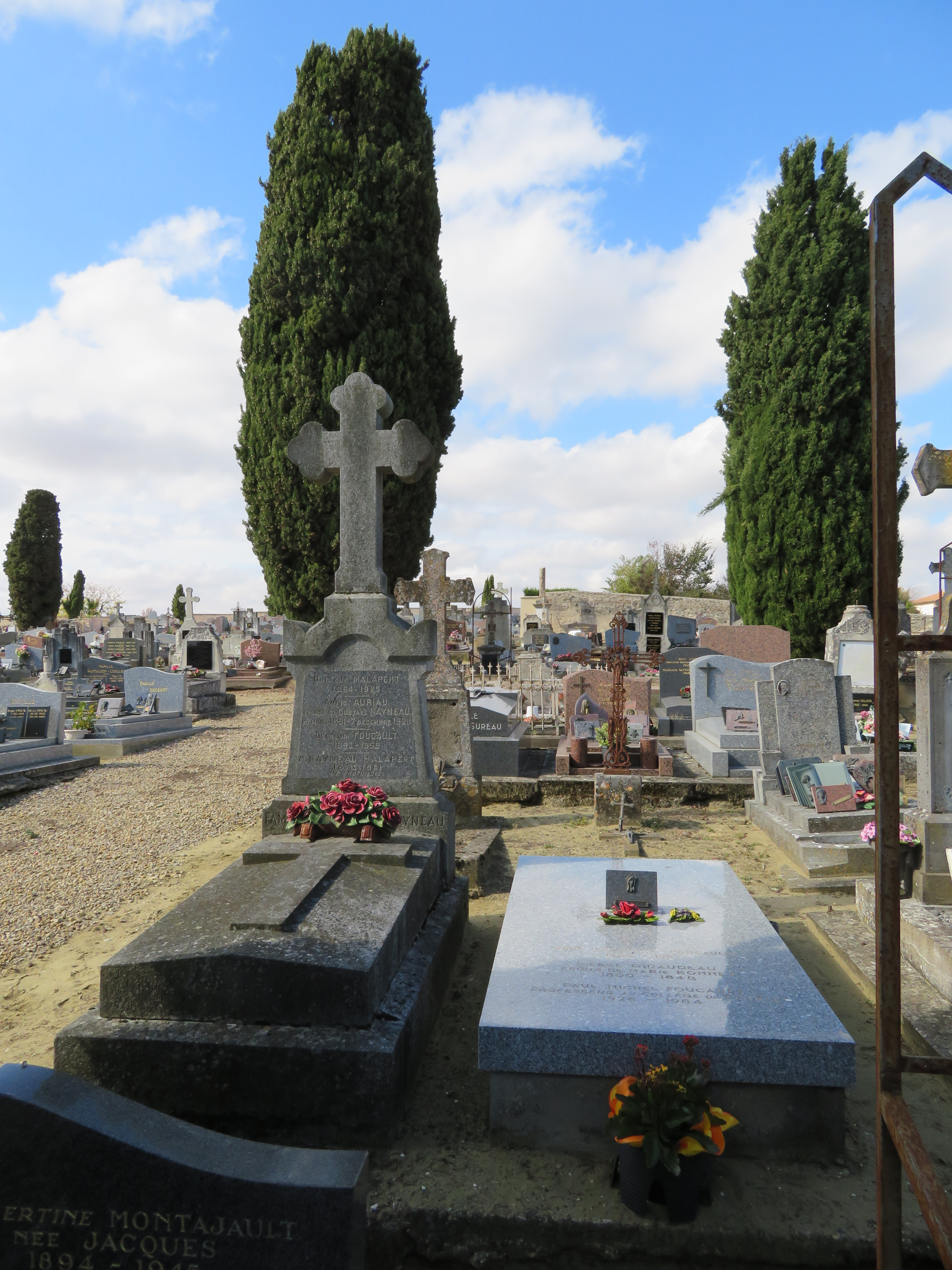
Graves of Michel Foucault, his mother (right) and his father (left) in Vendeuvre-du-Poitou

On 26 June 1984, Libération announced Foucault's death, mentioning the rumour that it had been brought on by AIDS. The following day, Le Monde issued a medical bulletin cleared by his family that made no reference to HIV/AIDS. On 29 June, Foucault's la levée du corps ceremony was held, in which the coffin was carried from the hospital morgue. Hundreds attended, including activists and academic friends, while Gilles Deleuze gave a speech using excerpts from The History of Sexuality. His body was then buried at Vendeuvre-du-Poitou in a small ceremony. Soon after his death, Foucault's partner Daniel Defert founded the first national HIV/AIDS organisation in France, AIDES; a play on the French word for "help" (aide) and the English-language acronym for the disease. On the second anniversary of Foucault's death, Defert publicly revealed in The Advocate that Foucault's death was AIDS-related.

== Personal life ==
Foucault's first biographer, Didier Eribon, described the philosopher as "a complex, many-sided character", and that "under one mask there is always another". He also noted that he exhibited an "enormous capacity for work". At the ENS, Foucault's classmates unanimously summed him up as a figure who was both "disconcerting and strange" and "a passionate worker". As he aged, his personality changed: Eribon noted that while he was a "tortured adolescent", post-1960, he had become "a radiant man, relaxed and cheerful", even being described by those who worked with him as a dandy. He noted that in 1969, Foucault embodied the idea of "the militant intellectual".

Foucault was an atheist. He loved classical music, particularly enjoying the work of Johann Sebastian Bach and Wolfgang Amadeus Mozart, and became known for wearing turtleneck sweaters. After his death, Foucault's friend Georges Dumézil described him as having possessed "a profound kindness and goodness", also exhibiting an "intelligence [that] literally knew no bounds". His life-partner Daniel Defert inherited his estate, whose archive was sold in 2012 to the National Library of France for €3.8 million ($4.5 million in April 2021).

=== Politics ===
Politically, Foucault was a leftist throughout much of his life, though his particular stance within the left often changed. In the early 1950s, while never adopting an orthodox Marxist viewpoint, Foucault had been a member of the French Communist Party, leaving the party after three years as he expressed disgust in the prejudice within its ranks against Jews and homosexuals. After spending some time working in Poland, he became further disillusioned with communist ideology. As a result, in the early 1960s, Foucault was considered to be "violently anticommunist" by some of his detractors, even though he was involved in leftist campaigns along with most of his students and colleagues.

== Philosophical work ==
Foucault's colleague Pierre Bourdieu summarized the philosopher's thought as "a long exploration of transgression, of going beyond social limits, always inseparably linked to knowledge and power".

The theme that underlies all Foucault's work is the relationship between power and knowledge, and how the former is used to control and define the latter. What authorities claim as 'scientific knowledge' are really just means of social control. Foucault shows how, for instance, in the eighteenth century 'madness' was used to categorize and stigmatize not just the mentally ill but the poor, the sick, the homeless and, indeed, anyone whose expressions of individuality were unwelcome.

— Philip Stokes, Philosophy: 100 Essential Thinkers (2004)

Philosopher Philip Stokes of the University of Reading noted that overall, Foucault's work was "dark and pessimistic". Though it does, however, leave some room for optimism, in that it illustrates how the discipline of philosophy can be used to highlight areas of domination. In doing so, as Stokes claimed, the ways in which we are being dominated become better understood, so that we may strive to build social structures that minimise this risk of domination. In all of this development there had to be close attention to detail; it is the detail which eventually individualizes people.

Later in his life, Foucault explained that his work was less about analyzing power as a phenomenon than about trying to characterize the different ways in which contemporary society has expressed the use of power to "objectivise subjects". These have taken three broad forms: one involving scientific authority to classify and 'order' knowledge about human populations; the second has been to categorize and 'normalise' human subjects (by identifying madness, illness, physical features, and so on); and the third relates to the manner in which the impulse to fashion sexual identities and train one's own body to engage in routines and practices ends up reproducing certain patterns within a given society.

=== Literature ===
In addition to his philosophical work, Foucault also wrote on literature. Death and the Labyrinth: The World of Raymond Roussel, published in 1963 and translated in English in 1986, is Foucault's only book-length work on literature. He described it as "by far the book I wrote most easily, with the greatest pleasure, and most rapidly". Foucault explores theory, criticism, and psychology with reference to the texts of Raymond Roussel, one of the first notable experimental writers. Foucault also gave a lecture responding to Roland Barthes' famous essay "The Death of the Author" titled "What Is an Author?" in 1969, later published in full. According to literary theoretician Kornelije Kvas, for Foucault, "denying the existence of a historical author on account of his/her irrelevance for interpretation is absurd, for the author is a function of the text that organizes its sense".

=== Power ===
Foucault's analysis of power comes in two forms: empirical and theoretical. The empirical analyses concern themselves with historical (and modern) forms of power and how these emerged from previous forms of power. Foucault describes three types of power in his empirical analyses: sovereign power, disciplinary power, and biopower.

Foucault is generally critical of "theories" that try to give absolute answers to "everything". Therefore, he considered his own "theory" of power to be closer to a method than a typical "theory". According to Foucault, most people misunderstand power. For this reason, he makes clear that power cannot be completely described as:

- A group of institutions and/or mechanisms whose aim it is for a citizen to obey and yield to the state (a typical liberal definition of power);
- Yielding to rules (a typical psychoanalytical definition of power); or
- A general and oppressing system where one societal class or group oppresses another (a typical feminist or Orthodox Marxist definition of power).

Foucault is not critical of considering these phenomena as "power", but claims that these theories of power cannot completely describe all forms of power. Foucault also claims that a liberal definition of power has effectively hidden other forms of power to the extent that people have uncritically accepted them.

Foucault's power analysis begins on micro-level, with singular "force relations". Richard A. Lynch defines Foucault's concept of "force relation" as "whatever in one's social interactions that pushes, urges or compels one to do something". According to Foucault, force relations are an effect of difference, inequality or unbalance that exists in other forms of relationships (such as sexual or economic). Force, and power, is however not something that a person or group "holds" (such as in the sovereign definition of power), instead power is a complex group of forces that comes from "everything" and therefore exists everywhere. That relations of power always result from inequality, difference or unbalance also means that power always has a goal or purpose. Power comes in two forms: tactics and strategies. Tactics is power on the micro-level, which can for example be how a person chooses to express themselves through their clothes. Strategies on the other hand, is power on macro-level, which can be the state of fashion at any moment. Strategies consist of a combination of tactics. At the same time, power is non-subjective according to Foucault. This posits a paradox, according to Lynch, since "someone" has to exert power, while at the same time there can be no "someone" exerting this power. According to Lynch this paradox can be solved with two observations:

- By looking at power as something which reaches further than the influence of single people or groups. Even if individuals and groups try to influence fashion, for example, their actions will often get unexpected consequences.
- Even if individuals and groups have a free choice, they are also affected and limited by their context/situation.

According to Foucault, force relations are constantly changing, constantly interacting with other force relations which may weaken, strengthen or change one another. Foucault writes that power always includes resistance, which means there is always a possibility that power and force relations will change in some way. According to Richard A. Lynch, the purpose of Foucault's work on power is to increase peoples' awareness of how power has shaped their way of being, thinking and acting, and by increasing this awareness making it possible for them to change their way of being, thinking and acting.

==== Sovereign power ====
With "sovereign power" Foucault alludes to a power structure that is similar to a pyramid, where one person or a group of people (at the top of the pyramid) holds the power, while the "normal" (and oppressed) people are at the bottom of the pyramid. In the middle parts of the pyramid are the people who enforce the sovereign's orders. A typical example of sovereign power is absolute monarchy.

In historical absolute monarchies, crimes had been considered a personal offense against the sovereign and his/her power. The punishment was often public and spectacular, partly to deter others from committing crimes, but also to reinstate the sovereign's power. This was however both expensive and ineffective—it led far too often to people sympathizing with the criminal. In modern times, when disciplinary power is dominant, criminals are instead subjected to various disciplinary techniques to "remold" the criminal into a "law abiding citizen".

According to Chloë Taylor, a characteristic for sovereign power is that the sovereign has the right to take life, wealth, services, labor and products. The sovereign has a right to subtract—to take life, to enslave life, etc.—but not the right to control life in the way that later happens in disciplinary systems of power. According to Taylor, the form of power that the philosopher Thomas Hobbes is concerned about, is sovereign power. According to Hobbes, people are "free" so long they are not literally placed in chains.

==== Disciplinary power ====
What Foucault calls "disciplinary power" aims to use bodies' skills as effectively as possible. The more useful the body becomes, the more obedient it also has to become. The purpose of this is not only to use the bodies' skills, but also prevent these skills from being used to revolt against the power.

Disciplinary power has "individuals" as its object, target and instrument. According to Foucault, "individual" is however a construct created by disciplinary power. The disciplinary power's techniques create a "rational self-control", which in practice means that the disciplinary power is internalized and therefore doesn't continuously need external force. Foucault says that disciplinary power is primarily not an oppressing form of power, but rather so a productive form of power. Disciplinary power doesn't oppress interests or desires, but instead subjects bodies to reconstructed patterns of behavior to reconstruct their thoughts, desires and interests. According to Foucault this happens in factories, schools, hospitals and prisons. Disciplinary power creates a certain type of individual by producing new movements, habits and skills. It focuses on details, single movements, their timing and speed. It organizes bodies in time and space, and controls every movement for maximal effect. It uses rules, surveillance, exams and controls. The activities follow certain plans, whose purpose it is to lead the bodies to certain pre-determined goals. The bodies are also combined with each other, to reach a productivity that is greater than the sum of all bodies activities.

Disciplinary power has according to Foucault been especially successful due to its usage of three technologies: hierarchical observation, normalizing judgement and exams. By hierarchical observation, the bodies become constantly visible to the power. The observation is hierarchical since there is not a single observer, but rather so a "hierarchy" of observers. An example of this is mental asylums during the 19th century, when the psychiatrist was not the only observer, but also nurses and auxiliary staff. From these observations and scientific discourses, a norm is established and used to judge the observed bodies. For the disciplinary power to continue to exist, this judgement has to be normalized. Foucault mentions several characteristics of this judgement: (1) all deviations, even small ones, from correct behavior are punished, (2) repeated rule violations are punished extra, (3) exercises are used as a behavior correcting technique and punishment, (4) rewards are used together with punishment to establish a hierarchy of good and bad behavior/people, (5) rank/grades/etc. are used as punishment and reward. Examinations combine the hierarchical observation with judgement. Exams objectify and individualize the observed bodies by creating extensive documentation about every observed body. The purpose of the exams is therefore to gather further information about each individual, track their development and compare their results to the norm.

According to Foucault, the "formula" for disciplinary power can be seen in philosopher Jeremy Bentham's plan for the "optimal prison": the panopticon. Such a prison consists of a circle-formed building where every cell is inhabited by only one prisoner. In every cell there are two windows—one to let in light from outside and one pointing to the middle of the circle-formed building. In this middle there is a tower where a guard can be placed to observe the prisoners. Since the prisoners will never be able to know whether they are being watched or not at a given moment, they will internalize the disciplinary power and regulate their own behavior (as if they were constantly being watched). Foucault says this construction (1) creates an individuality by separating prisoners from each other in the physical room, (2) since the prisoners cannot know if they are being watched at any given moment, they internalize the disciplinary power and regulate their own behavior as if they were always watched, (3) the surveillance makes it possible to create extensive documentation about each prisoner and their behavior. According to Foucault the panopticon has been used as a model also for other disciplinary institutions, such as mental asylums in the 19th century.

==== Biopower ====
With "biopower" Foucault refers to power over bios (life)—power over populations. Biopower primarily rests on norms which are internalized by people, rather than external force. It encourages, strengthens, controls, observes, optimizes and organize the forces below it. Foucault has sometimes described biopower as separate from disciplinary power, but at other times he has described disciplinary power as an expression of biopower. Biopower can use disciplinary techniques, but in contrast to disciplinary power its target is populations rather than individuals.

Biopower studies populations regarding (for example) number of births, life expectancy, public health, housing, migration, crime, which social groups are over-represented in deviations from the norm (regarding health, crime, etc.) and tries to adjust, control or eliminate these norm deviations. One example is the age distribution in a population. Biopower is interested in age distribution to compensate for future (or current) lacks of labor power, retirement homes, etc. Yet another example is sex: because sex is connected to population growth, sex and sexuality have been of great interest to biopower. On a disciplinary level, people who engaged in non-reproductive sexual acts have been treated for psychiatric diagnoses such as "perversion", "frigidity" and "sexual dysfunction". On a biopower-level, the usage of contraceptives has been studied, some social groups have (by various means) been encouraged to have children, while others (such as poor, sick, unmarried women, criminals or people with disabilities) have been discouraged or prevented from having children.

In the era of biopower, death has become a scandal and a catastrophe, but despite this biopower has according to Foucault killed more people than any other form of power has ever done before it. Under sovereign power, the sovereign king could kill people to exert his power or start wars simply to extend his kingdom, but during the era of biopower wars have instead been motivated by an ambition to "protect life itself". Similar motivations has also been used for genocide. For example, Nazi Germany motivated its attempt to eradicate Jews, the mentally ill and disabled with the motivation that Jews were "a threat to the German health", and that the money spent on healthcare for mentally ill and disabled people would be better spent on "viable Germans". Chloë Taylor also mentions the Iraq War was motivated by similar tenets. The motivation was at first that Iraq was thought to have weapons of mass destruction and connections to Al-Qaeda. However, when the Bush and Blair administrations did not find any evidence to support either of these theories, the motivation for the war was changed. In the new motivation, the cause of the war was said to be that Saddam Hussein had committed crimes against his own population. Taylor means that in modern times, war has to be "concealed" under a rhetoric of humanitarian aid, despite the fact that these wars often cause humanitarian crises.

During the 19th century, slums were increasing in number and size across the western world. Criminality, illness, alcoholism and prostitution was common in these areas, and the middle class considered the people who lived in these slums as "unmoral" and "lazy". The middle class also feared that this underclass sooner or later would "take over" because the population growth was greater in these slums than it was in the middle class. This fear gave rise to the scientific study of eugenics, whose founder Francis Galton had been inspired by Charles Darwin and his theory of natural selection. According to Galton, society was preventing natural selection by helping "the weak", thus causing a spread of the "negative qualities" into the rest of the population.

=== The body and sexuality ===
According to Foucault, the body is not something objective that stands outside history and culture. Instead, Foucault argues, the body has been and is continuously shaped by society and history—by work, diet, body ideals, exercise, medical interventions, etc. Foucault presents no "theory" of the body, but does write about it in Discipline and Punish as well as in The History of Sexuality. Foucault was critical of all purely biological explanations of phenomena such as sexuality, madness and criminality. Further, Foucault argues, that the body is not sufficient as a basis for self-understanding and understanding of others.

In Discipline and Punish, Foucault shows how power and the body are tied together, for example by the disciplinary power primarily focusing on individual bodies and their behavior. Foucault argues that power, by manipulating bodies/behavior, also manipulates people's minds. Foucault turns the platonic saying "the body is the prison of the soul" (Phaedo, 66a–67d) and instead posits that "the soul is the prison of the body".

According to Foucault, sexology has tried to exert itself as a "science" by referring to the material (the body). In contrast to this, Foucault argues that sexology is a pseudoscience, and that "sex" is a pseudo-scientific idea. For Foucault the idea of a natural, biologically grounded and fundamental sexuality is a normative historical construct that has also been used as an instrument of power. By describing sex as the biological and fundamental cause to people's gender identity, sexual identity and sexual behavior, power has effectively been able to normalize sexual and gendered behavior. This has made it possible to evaluate, pathologize and "correct" peoples' sexual and gendered behavior, by comparing bodies behaviors to the constructed "normal" behavior. For Foucault, a "normal sexuality" is as much of a construct as a "natural sexuality". Therefore, Foucault was also critical of the popular discourse that dominated the debate over sexuality during the 1960s and 1970s. During this time, the popular discourse argued for a "liberation" of sexuality from a cultural, moral and capitalistic oppression. Foucault, however, argues that peoples' opinions about and experiences of sexuality are always a result of cultural and power mechanisms. To "liberate" sexuality from one group of norms only means that another group of norms takes its place. This, however, does not mean that Foucault considers resistance to be futile. What Foucault argues for is rather that it is impossible to become completely free from power, and that there is simply no "natural" sexuality. Power always involves a dimension of resistance, and therefore also a possibility for change. Although Foucault considers it impossible to step outside of power-networks, it is always possible to change these networks or navigate them differently.

According to Foucault, the body is not only an "obedient and passive object" that is dominated by discourses and power. The body is also the "seed" to resistance against dominant discourses and power techniques. The body is never fully compliant, and experiences can never fully be reduced to linguistic descriptions. There is always a possibility to experience something that is not possible to describe with words, and in this discrepancy there is also a possibility for resistance against dominant discourses.

Foucault's view of the historical construction of the body has influenced many feminist and queer-theorists. According to Johanna Oksala, Foucault's influence on queer theory has been so great than he can be considered one of the founders of queer theory. The fundamental idea behind queer theory is that there is no natural fundament that lies behind identities such as gay, lesbian, heterosexual, etc. Instead these identities are considered cultural constructions that have been constructed through normative discourses and relations of power. Feminists have with the help of Foucault's ideas studied different ways that women form their bodies: through plastic surgery, diet, eating disorders, etc. Foucault's historization of sex has also affected feminist theorists such as Judith Butler, who used Foucault's theories about the relation between subject, power and sex to question gendered subjects. Butler follows Foucault by saying that there is no "true" gender behind gender identity that constitutes its biological and objective fundament. However, Butler is critical of Foucault, arguing that Foucault "naively" presents bodies and pleasures as a ground for resistance against power without extending his historization of sexuality to gendered subjects/bodies. Foucault has received criticism from other feminists, such as Susan Bordo and Kate Soper.

Johanna Oksala argues that Foucault, by saying that sex/sexuality are constructed, doesn't deny the existence of sexuality. Oksala also argues that the goal of critical theories such as Foucault's is not to liberate the body and sexuality from oppression, but rather to question and deny the identities that are posited as "natural" and "essential" by showing how these identities are historical and cultural constructions.

In May 1977, Foucault signed a petition to the French parliament, calling for the lowering of the homosexual age of consent from 21 to 15 to match with the heterosexual one. In a 1978 broadcast, Foucault argued that children could give sexual consent, saying that "to assume that a child is incapable of explaining what happened and was incapable of giving his consent are two abuses that are intolerable, quite unacceptable."

=== Subjectivity ===
Foucault considered his primary project to be the investigation of how people through history have been made into "subjects". Subjectivity, for Foucault, is not a state of being, but a practice—an active "being". According to Foucault, "the subject" has, by western philosophers, usually been considered as something given; natural and objective. On the contrary, Foucault considers subjectivity to be a construction created by power. Foucault talks of "assujettissement", which is a French term that for Foucault refers to a process where power creates subjects while also oppressing them using social norms. For Foucault "social norms" are standards that people are encouraged to follow, that are also used to compare and define people. As an example of "assujettissement", Foucault mentions "homosexual", a historically contingent type of subjectivity that was created by sexology. Foucault writes that sodomy was previously considered a serious sexual deviation, but a temporary one. Homosexuality, however, became a "species", a past, a childhood and a type of life. "Homosexuals" have by the same power that created this subjectivity been discriminated against, due to homosexuality being considered as a deviation from the "normal" sexuality. However, Foucault argues, the creation of a subjectivity such as "homosexuality" does not only have negative consequences for the people who are subjectivised—subjectivity of homosexuality has also led to the creation of gay bars and the pride parade.

According to Foucault, scientific discourses have played an important role in the disciplinary power system, by classifying and categorizing people, observing their behavior and "treating" them when their behavior has been considered "abnormal". He defines discourse as a form of oppression that does not require physical force. He identifies its production as "controlled, selected, organized and redistributed by a certain number of procedures", which are driven by individuals' aspiration of knowledge to create "rules" and "systems" that translate into social codes. Moreover, discourse creates a force that extends beyond societal institutions and could be found in social and formal fields such as health care systems, education and law enforcement. The formation of these fields may seem to contribute to social development; however, Foucault warns against discourses' harmful aspects on society.

Sciences such as psychiatry, biology, medicine, economics, psychoanalysis, psychology, sociology, ethnology, pedagogy and criminology have all categorized behaviors as rational, irrational, normal, abnormal, human, inhuman, etc. By doing so, they have all created various types of subjectivity and norms, which are then internalized by people as "truths". People have then adapted their behavior to get closer to what these sciences has labeled as "normal". For example, Foucault claims that psychological observation/surveillance and psychological discourses have created a type of psychology-centered subjectivity, which has led to people considering unhappiness a fault in their psychology rather than in society. This has also, according to Foucault, been a way for society to resist criticism—criticism against society has been turned against the individual and their psychological health.

==== Self-constituting subjectivity ====
According to Foucault, subjectivity is not necessarily something that is forced upon people externally—it is also something that is established in a person's relation to themselves. This can, for example, happen when a person is trying to "find themselves" or "be themselves", something Edward McGushin describes as a typical modern activity. In this quest for the "true self", the self is established in two levels: as a passive object (the "true self" that is searched for) and as an active "searcher". The ancient Cynics and the 19th-century philosopher Friedrich Nietzsche posited that the "true self" can only be found by going through great hardship and/or danger. The ancient Stoics and 17th-century philosopher René Descartes, however, argued that the "self" can be found by quiet and solitary introspection. Yet another example is Socrates, who argued that self-awareness can only be found by having debates with others, where the debaters question each other's foundational views and opinions. Foucault, however, argued that "subjectivity" is a process, rather than a state of being. As such, Foucault argued that there is no "true self" to be found. Rather so, the "self" is constituted/created in activities such as the ones employed to "find" the "self". In other words, exposing oneself to hardships and danger does not "reveal" the "true self", according to Foucault, but rather creates a particular type of self and subjectivity. However, according to Foucault the "form" for the subject is in great part already constituted by power, before these self-constituting practices are employed. Schools, workplaces, households, government institutions, entertainment media and the healthcare sector all, through disciplinary power, contribute to forming people into being particular types of subjects.

=== Freedom ===
Todd May defines Foucault's concept of freedom as: that which we can do of ourselves within our specific historical context. A condition for this, according to Foucault, is that we are aware of our situation and how it has been created/affected (and is still being affected) by power. According to May, two of the aspects of how power has shaped peoples' way of being, thinking and acting are described in the books where Foucault deals with disciplinary power and the history of sexuality. However, May argues, there will always be aspects of peoples' formation that will be unknown to them, hence the constant necessity for the type of analyses that Foucault did.

Foucault argues that the forces that have affected people can be changed; people always have the capacity to change the factors that limit their freedom. Freedom is thus not a state of being, but a practice—a way of being in relation to oneself, to others and to the world. According to Todd May, Foucault's concept of freedom also includes constructing histories like the ones Foucault did about the history of disciplinary power and sexuality—histories that investigate and describe the forces that have influenced people into becoming who they are. From the knowledge that is reached through such investigations, people can thereafter decide which forces they believe are acceptable and which they consider to be intolerable and has to be changed. Freedom is for Foucault a type of "experimentation" with different "transformations". Since these experiments cannot be controlled completely, May argues they may either lead to the reconstruction of intolerable power relations or the creation of new ones. Thus, May argues, it is always necessary to continue with such experimentation and Foucauldian analyses.

==== Practice of critique ====
Foucault's "alternative" to the modern subjectivity is described by Cressida Heyes as "critique". For Foucault there are no "good" and "bad" forms of subjectivity, since they are all a result of power relations. In the same way, Foucault argues there are no "good" and "bad" norms. All norms and institutions are at the same time enabling as they are oppressing. Therefore, Foucault argues, it is always crucial to continue with the practice of "critique". Critique is for Foucault a practice that searches for the processes and events that led to our way of being—a questioning of who we "are" and how this "we" came to be. Such a "critical ontology" of the present shows that peoples' current "being" is in fact a historically contingent, unstable and changeable construction. Foucault emphasizes that since the current way of being is not a necessity, it is also possible to change it. Critique also includes investigating how and when people are being enabled and when they are being oppressed by the current norms and institutions, finding ways to reduce limitations on freedom, resist normalization and develop new and different way of relating to oneself and others. Foucault argues that it is impossible to go beyond power relations, but that it is always possible to navigate power relations in a different way.

==== Epimeleia heautou, "care for the self" ====
As an alternative to the modern "search" for the "true self", and as a part of "the work of freedom", Foucault discusses the antique Greek term epimeleia heautou, "care for the self" (ἐπιμέλεια ἑαυτοῦ). According to Foucault, among the ancient Greek philosophers, self-awareness was not a goal in itself, but rather something that was sought after in order to "care for oneself". Care for the self consists of what Foucault calls "the art of living" or "technologies of the self". The goal of these techniques was, according to Foucault, to transform oneself into a more ethical person. As an example of this, Foucault mentions meditation, the stoic activity of contemplating past and future actions and evaluating if these actions are in line with one's values and goals, and "contemplation of nature". Contemplation of nature is another stoic activity, that consists of reflecting on how "small" one's existence is when compared to the greater cosmos.

=== Knowledge ===
Foucault is described by Mary Beth Mader as an epistemological constructivist and historicist. Foucault is critical of the idea that humans can reach "absolute" knowledge about the world. A fundamental goal in many of Foucault's works is to show how that which has traditionally been considered as absolute, universal and true in fact are historically contingent. To Foucault, even the idea of absolute knowledge is a historically contingent idea. This does however not lead to epistemological nihilism; rather, Foucault argues that we "always begin anew" when it comes to knowledge. At the same time Foucault is critical of modern western philosophy for lacking "spirituality". With "spirituality" Foucault refers to a certain type of ethical being, and the processes that lead to this state of being. Foucault argues that such a spirituality was a natural part of the ancient Greek philosophy, where knowledge was considered as something that was only accessible to those that had an ethical character. According to Foucault this changed in the "cartesian moment", the moment when René Descartes reached the "insight" that self-awareness was something given (Cogito, ergo sum, "I think, therefore I am"), and from this "insight" Descartes drew conclusions about God, the world, and knowledge. According to Foucault, since Descartes knowledge has been something separate from ethics. In modern times, Foucault argues, anyone can reach "knowledge", as long as they are rational beings, educated, willing to participate in the scientific community and use a scientific method. Foucault is critical of this "modern" view of knowledge.

Foucault describes two types of "knowledge": "savoir" and "connaissance", two French terms that both can be translated as "knowledge" but with separate meanings for Foucault. By "savoir" Foucault is referring to a process where subjects are created, while at the same time these subjects also become objects for knowledge. An example of this can be seen in criminology and psychiatry. In these sciences, subjects such as "the rational person", "the mentally ill person", "the law abiding person", "the criminal", etc. are created, and these sciences center their attention and knowledge on these subjects. The knowledge about these subjects is "connaissance", while the process in which subjects and knowledge are created is "savoir". A similar term in Foucault's corpus is "pouvoir/savoir" (power/knowledge). With this term Foucault is referring to a type of knowledge that is considered "common sense", but that is created and withheld in that position (as "common sense") by power. The term power/knowledge comes from Jeremy Bentham's idea that panopticons wouldn't only be prisons, but would be used for experiments where the criminals' behaviour would be studied. Power/knowledge thus refers to forms of power where the power compares individuals, measures differences, establishes a norm and then forces this norm unto the subjects. This is especially successful when the established norm is internalized and institutionalized (by "institutionalized" Foucault refers to when the norm is omnipresent). Because then, when the norm is internalized and institutionalized, it has effectively become a part of peoples' "common sense"—the "obvious", the "given", the "natural". When this has happened, this "common sense" also affects the explicit knowledge (scientific knowledge), Foucault argues. Ellen K. Feder states that the premise "the world consists of women and men" is an example of this. This premise, Feder argues, has been considered "common sense", and has led to the creation of the psychiatric diagnosis gender identity disorder (GID). For example, during the 1970s, children with behavior that was not considered appropriate for their gender was diagnosed with GID. The treatment then consisted of trying to make the child adapt to the prevailing gender norms. Feder argues that this is an example of power/knowledge since psychiatry, from the "common sense" premise "the world consists of women and men" (a premise which is upheld in this status by power), created a new diagnosis, a new type of subject and a whole body of knowledge surrounding this new subject.

== Influence and reception ==
Foucault's works have exercised a powerful influence over numerous humanistic and social scientific disciplines as one of the most influential and controversial scholars of the post-World War II period. According to a London School of Economics' analysis in 2016, his works Discipline and Punish and The History of Sexuality were among the 25 most cited books in the social sciences of all time, at just over 100,000 citations. In 2007, Foucault was listed as the single most cited scholar in the humanities by the ISI Web of Science among a large quantity of French philosophers, the compilation's author commenting that "What this says of modern scholarship is for the reader to decide—and it is imagined that judgments will vary from admiration to despair, depending on one's view".

According to Gary Gutting, Foucault's "detailed historical remarks on the emergence of disciplinary and regulatory biopower have been widely influential". Leo Bersani wrote that:

"[Foucault] is our most brilliant philosopher of power. More originally than any other contemporary thinker, he has attempted to define the historical constraints under which we live, at the same time that he has been anxious to account for—if possible, even to locate—the points at which we might resist those constraints and counter some of the moves of power. In the present climate of cynical disgust with the exercise of political power, Foucault's importance can hardly be exaggerated."

Foucault's work on "biopower" has been widely influential within the disciplines of philosophy and political theory, particularly for such authors as Giorgio Agamben, Roberto Esposito, Antonio Negri, and Michael Hardt. His discussions on power and discourse have inspired many critical theorists, who believe that Foucault's analysis of power structures could aid the struggle against inequality. They claim that through discourse analysis, hierarchies may be uncovered and questioned by way of analyzing the corresponding fields of knowledge through which they are legitimated. This is one of the ways that Foucault's work is linked to critical theory. His work Discipline and Punish influenced his friend and contemporary Gilles Deleuze, who published the paper "Postscript on the Societies of Control", praising Foucault's work but arguing that contemporary western society has in fact developed from a 'disciplinary society' into a 'society of control'. Deleuze went on to publish a book dedicated to Foucault's thought in 1988 under the title Foucault.

Foucault's discussions of the relationship between power and knowledge has influenced postcolonial critiques in explaining the discursive formation of colonialism, particularly in Edward Said's work Orientalism. Foucault's work has been compared to that of Erving Goffman by the sociologist Michael Hviid Jacobsen and Soren Kristiansen, who list Goffman as an influence on Foucault. Foucault's writings, particularly The History of Sexuality, have also been very influential in feminist philosophy and queer theory, particularly the work of the major Feminist scholar Judith Butler due to his theories regarding the genealogy of maleness and femaleness, power, sexuality, and bodies.

=== Critiques and engagements ===
==== Crypto-normativity, self-refutation, defeatism ====
A prominent critique of Foucault's thought concerns his refusal to propose positive solutions to the social and political issues that he critiques. Since no human relation is devoid of power, freedom becomes elusive—even as an ideal. This stance which critiques normativity as socially constructed and contingent, but which relies on an implicit norm to mount the critique led philosopher Jürgen Habermas to describe Foucault's thinking as "crypto-normativist", covertly reliant on the very Enlightenment principles he attempts to argue against. A similar critique has been advanced by Diana Taylor, and by Nancy Fraser who argues that "Foucault's critique encompasses traditional moral systems, he denies himself by recourse to concepts such as 'freedom' and 'justice', and therefore lacks the ability to generate positive alternatives."

==== Genealogy as historical method ====
The philosopher Richard Rorty has argued that Foucault's "archaeology of knowledge" is fundamentally negative, and thus fails to adequately establish any "new" theory of knowledge per se. Rather, Foucault simply provides a few valuable maxims regarding the reading of history. Rorty writes:

As far as I can see, all he has to offer are brilliant redescriptions of the past, supplemented by helpful hints on how to avoid being trapped by old historiographical assumptions. These hints consist largely of saying: "do not look for progress or meaning in history; do not see the history of a given activity, of any segment of culture, as the development of rationality or of freedom; do not use any philosophical vocabulary to characterize the essence of such activity or the goal it serves; do not assume that the way this activity is presently conducted gives any clue to the goals it served in the past".

Genealogy emerged in Foucault's writing in the early 1970s as a corrective to what he saw as deficiencies in the previous methodology he described as archaeology. Specifically Genealogy allowed Foucault a method to explain how "the epistemological succession of discursive formations" could occur within the methodology of the older Archaeology.

Foucault has frequently been criticized by historians for what they consider to be a lack of rigor in his analyses. For example, Hans-Ulrich Wehler harshly criticized Foucault in 1998. According to Wehler, Foucault's works are not only insufficient in their empirical historical aspects, but also often contradictory and lacking in clarity. For example, Foucault's concept of power is "desperatingly undifferentiated", and Foucault's thesis of a "disciplinary society" is, according to Wehler, only possible because Foucault does not properly differentiate between authority, force, power, violence and legitimacy.

T'Jampens and Versieren describe Foucault as having experienced a severe personal crisis at the start of his "Il faut défendre la société" lecture series on the basis of the account of Gilles Deleuze. They describe this crisis as the culmination of Foucault's own doubts regarding "certain key aspects of the genealogical method." They describe these lectures as the construction of a dialectic between the older archaeological method and the newer genealogical one, using the methodological tools of the first to correct Foucault's self-identified flaws in the second.

==== Feminist critiques ====
Though American feminists have built on Foucault's critiques of the historical construction of gender roles and sexuality, some feminists note the limitations of the masculinist subjectivity and ethical orientation that he describes. A related issue raised by scholars Elizabeth Povinelli and Kathryn Yusoff is the almost complete absence of any discussion of race in his writings. Yusoff (2018, p. 211) says "Povinelli draws our attention to the provinciality of Foucault's project in its conceptualization of a Western European genealogy".

==== Sexuality ====
The philosopher Roger Scruton argues in Sexual Desire (1986) that Foucault was incorrect to claim, in The History of Sexuality, that sexual morality is culturally relative. He criticizes Foucault for assuming that there could be societies in which a "problematisation" of the sexual did not occur, concluding that, "No history of thought could show the 'problematisation' of sexual experience to be peculiar to certain specific social formations: it is characteristic of personal experience generally, and therefore of every genuine social order."

Foucault's approach to sexuality, which he sees as socially constructed, has become influential in queer theory. Foucault's resistance to identity politics, and his rejection of the psychoanalytic concept of "object choice", stand at odds with some theories of queer identity.

==== Social constructionism and human nature ====
Foucault is sometimes criticized for his purported social constructionism, which some see as an affront to the concept of truth. In Foucault's 1971 televised debate with Noam Chomsky, Foucault argued against the possibility of any fixed human nature, as posited by Chomsky's concept of innate human faculties. Chomsky argued that concepts of justice were rooted in human reason, whereas Foucault rejected the universal basis for a concept of justice. Following the debate, Chomsky was stricken with Foucault's total rejection of the possibility of a universal morality, stating "He struck me as completely amoral, I'd never met anyone who was so totally amoral [...] I mean, I liked him personally, it's just that I couldn't make sense of him. It's as if he was from a different species, or something."

==== Defeatism in education and authority ====
Peruvian writer Mario Vargas Llosa, while acknowledging that Foucault contributed to give a right of citizenship in cultural life to certain marginal and eccentric experiences (of sexuality, of cultural repression, of madness), asserts that his radical critique of authority was detrimental to education.

==== Forget Foucault ====
Jean Baudrillard's 1977 tract Oublier Foucault (trans. Forget Foucault) made Baudrillard instantly infamous within France, as it was a devastating critical analysis of Foucault's book the History of Sexuality—and of Foucault's entire oeuvre. In 1976, Jean Baudrillard sent this essay to the French magazine Critique, where Michel Foucault was an editor. Foucault was asked to reply, but remained silent. In it Baudrillard also launched attacks on those philosophers, like Gilles Deleuze and Félix Guattari, who believed that sexual desire and sexual liberation could be a revolutionary force. Baudrillard asserted that "Foucault's discourse is a mirror of the powers it describes." Since "it is possible at last to talk with such definitive understanding about power, sexuality, the body, and discipline [...] it is because at some point all this is here and now over with." Therefore, with "the coincidence between this new version of power and the new version of desire proposed by Deleuze and Lyotard [...] [which was] not accidental: it's simply that in Foucault power takes the place of desire [...] That is why there is no desire in Foucault: its place is already taken [...] When power blends into desire and desire blends into power, let's forget them both."

Oublier Foucault was published in English in 1998 as part of the Semiotext(e) Foreign Agents series as Forget Foucault.

== See also ==
- Foucault's lectures at the Collège de France
- List of atheist philosophers
- List of French philosophers
- Postsexualism
- Spatial turn
- The Frenchmen, Or, My Life in Theory by Emily Eakin
