= The History of Sexuality =

Four-volume book by Michel Foucault

- Cover of the first edition of volume 1
- Author: Michel Foucault
- Original title: Histoire de la sexualité
- Translator: Robert Hurley
- Language: French
- Subject: History of human sexuality
- Publisher: Éditions Gallimard
- Publication date: 1976 (vol. 1); 1984 (vol. 2); 1984 (vol. 3); 2018 (vol. 4)
- Publication place: France
- English publication date: 1978 (vol. 1); 1985 (vol. 2); 1986 (vol. 3); 2021 (vol. 4)
- Media type: Print (hardcover and paperback), audio (vol. 1-3)
- Pages: 168 (English ed., vol. 1); 293 (English ed., vol. 2); 279 (English ed., vol. 3); 416 (English ed., vol. 4)
- ISBN: 0-14-012474-8 (vol. 1); 0-14-013734-5 (vol. 2); 0-14-013735-1 (vol. 3); 978-1-52-474803-6 (vol. 4)

The History of Sexuality (French: L'Histoire de la sexualité) is a four-volume study of sexuality in the Western world by the French historian and philosopher Michel Foucault, in which the author examines the emergence of "sexuality" as a discursive object and separate sphere of life and argues that the notion that every individual has a sexuality is a relatively recent development in Western societies. The first volume, The Will to Knowledge (La volonté de savoir), was first published in 1976; an English translation appeared in 1978. The Use of Pleasure (L'usage des plaisirs) and The Care of the Self (Le souci de soi) were published in 1984. The fourth volume, Confessions of the Flesh (Les aveux de la chair), was published posthumously in 2018.

== Volume I: The Will to Knowledge ==
=== Part I: We "Other Victorians" ===
In Part One, Foucault discusses the "repressive hypothesis", the widespread belief among late 20th-century westerners that sexuality, and the open discussion of sex, was socially repressed during the late 17th, 18th, 19th and early 20th centuries, a by-product of the rise of capitalism and bourgeois society, before the partial liberation of sexuality in modern times. Arguing that sexuality was never truly repressed, Foucault asks why modern westerners believe the hypothesis, noting that in portraying past sexuality as repressed, it provides a basis for the idea that in rejecting past moral systems, future sexuality can be free and uninhibited, a "garden of earthly delights". The title of the section is inspired by Steven Marcus's book The Other Victorians: A Study of Sexuality and Pornography in Mid-Nineteenth-Century England.

=== Part II: The Repressive Hypothesis ===
We must ... abandon the hypothesis that modern industrial societies ushered in an age of increased sexual repression. We have not only witnessed a visible explosion of unorthodox sexualities; but – and this is the important point – a deployment quite different from the law, even if it is locally dependent on procedures of prohibition, has ensured, through a network of interconnecting mechanisms, the proliferation of specific pleasures and the multiplication of disparate sexualities.

— Foucault, 1976.

In Part Two, Foucault notes that from the 17th century to the 1970s, there had actually been a "veritable discursive explosion" in the discussion of sex, albeit using an "authorized vocabulary" that codified where one could talk about it, when one could talk about it, and with whom. He argues that this desire to talk so enthusiastically about sex in the western world stems from the Counter-Reformation, when the Roman Catholic Church called for its followers to confess their sinful desires as well as their actions. As evidence for the obsession of talking about sex, he highlights the publication of the book My Secret Life, anonymously written in the late 19th century and detailing the sex life of a Victorian gentleman. Indeed, Foucault states that at the start of the 18th century, there was an emergence of "a political, economic, and technical incitement to talk about sex", with self-appointed experts speaking both moralistically and rationally on sex, the latter sort trying to categorize it. He notes that in that century, governments became increasingly aware that they were not merely having to manage "subjects" or "a people" but a "population", and that because of this they had to concern themselves with such topics as birth and death rates, marriage, and contraception, thereby increasing their interest and changing their discourse on sexuality.

Foucault argues that prior to the 18th century, discourse on sexuality focuses on the productive role of the married couple, which is monitored by both canonical and civil law. In the 18th and 19th centuries, he argues, society ceases discussing the sex lives of married couples, instead taking an increasing interest in sexualities that did not fit within this union; the "world of perversion" that includes the sexuality of children, the mentally ill, the criminal and the homosexual. He notes that this had three major effects on society. Firstly, there was increasing categorization of these "perverts"; where previously a man who engaged in same-sex activities would be labeled as an individual who succumbed to the sin of sodomy, now they would be categorised into a new "species," that of homosexual. Secondly, Foucault argues that the labeling of perverts conveyed a sense of "pleasure and power" on to both those studying sexuality and the perverts themselves. Thirdly, he argues that bourgeois society exhibited "blatant and fragmented perversion," readily engaging in perversity but regulating where it could take place.

=== Part III: Scientia Sexualis ===
In part three, Foucault explores the development of the scientific study of sex, the attempt to unearth the "truth" of sex, a phenomenon which Foucault argues is peculiar to the West. In contrast to the West's sexual science, Foucault introduces the ars erotica, which he states has only existed in Ancient and Eastern societies. Furthermore, he argues that this scientia sexualis has repeatedly been used for political purposes, being utilized in the name of "public hygiene" to support state racism. Returning to the influence of Catholic confession, he looks at the relationship between the one confessing and the authoritarian figure that he confesses to, arguing that as Roman Catholicism was eclipsed in much of Western and Northern Europe following the Reformation, the concept of confession survived and became more widespread, entering into the relationship between parent and child, patient and psychiatrist and student and educator. By the 19th century, he maintains, the "truth" of sexuality was being readily explored both through confession and scientific enquiry. Foucault proceeds to examine how the confession of sexuality then comes to be "constituted in scientific terms," arguing that scientists begin to trace the cause of all aspects of human psychology and society to sexual factors.

=== Part IV: The Deployment of Sexuality ===
In part four, Foucault explores the question as to why western society wishes to seek for the "truth" of sex. Foucault argues for the need to develop an "analytics" of power through which to understand sex. Highlighting that power controls sex by laying down rules for others to follow, he discusses how power demands obedience through domination, submission, and subjugation, and also how power masks its true intentions by disguising itself as beneficial. As an example, he highlights the manner in which the feudal absolute monarchies of historical Europe, themselves a form of power, disguised their intentions by claiming that they were necessary to maintain law, order, and peace. As a leftover concept from the days of feudalism, Foucault argues that westerners still view power as emanating from law, but he rejects this, stressing the need to "construct an analytics of power that no longer takes law as a model and a code," and announcing that a different form of power governs sexuality. "We must," Foucault states, "at the same time conceive of sex without the law, and power without the king."

Foucault explains that he does not mean power as the domination or subjugation exerted on society by the government or the state. Rather, power should be understood "as the multiplicity of force relations immanent in the sphere in which they operate." In this way, he argues, "Power is everywhere ... because it comes from everywhere," emanating from all social relationships and being imposed throughout society bottom-up rather than top-down.

=== Part V: Right of Death and Power over Life ===
In part five, Foucault asserts that the motivations for power over life and death have changed. As in feudal times the "right to life" was more or less a "right to death" because sovereign powers were able to decide when a person died. This has changed to a "right to live," as sovereign states are more concerned about the power of how people live. Power becomes about how to foster life. For example, a state decides to execute someone as a safe guard to society not as justified, as it once was, as vengeful justice. This new emphasis on power over life is called Biopower and comes in two forms. First, Foucault says it is "centered on the body as a machine: its disciplining, the optimization of its capabilities, the extortion of its forces, the parallel increase of its usefulness and its docility, its integration into systems of efficient and economic controls." The second form, Foucault argues, emerged later and focuses on the "species body, the body imbued with the mechanics of life and serving as the basis of the biological processes: propagation, births and mortality, the level of health, life expectancy and longevity, with all the conditions that cause these to vary." Biopower, it is argued, is the source of the rise of capitalism, as states became interested in regulating and normalizing power over life and not as concerned about punishing and condemning actions.

== Volume II: The Use of Pleasure ==
Exploring works of ancient philosophers such as Seneca, Xenophon, Plato, and many more, Foucault explains the aim of this volume to unravel the process of the structuralization of sexuality as an ethical practice in Greek culture. To do so, the book inspects four Greek practices: dietetics to understand the relation of the self with the body, economics as the management of marriage and households, erotics to explore the codes of conduct between men and boys, and finally, the understanding of true love in philosophy. For Foucault, this exploration of classical practices illustrates a "history of the desiring subject", which is crucial for understanding the modern construction of sexuality.

== Volume IV: Confessions of the Flesh ==
In this draft version of the fourth volume, published and translated after his death, Foucault traces the adoption and adaptation by early Christian societies of earlier pre-Christian ideas of pleasure. He discusses Saint Augustine of Hippo.

== Publication history ==
Three volumes of The History of Sexuality were published before Foucault's death in 1984. The first volume, The Will to Knowledge (previously known as An Introduction in English—Histoire de la sexualité, 1: la volonté de savoir in French) was published in France in 1976, and translated in 1977, focusing primarily on the last two centuries, and the functioning of sexuality as an analytics of power related to the emergence of a science of sexuality, and the emergence of biopower in the West.

The second two volumes, The Use of Pleasure (Histoire de la sexualité, II: l'usage des plaisirs) and The Care of the Self (Histoire de la sexualité, III: le souci de soi) dealt with the role of sex in Greek and Roman antiquity. The latter volume deals considerably with the ancient technological development of the hypomnema which was used to establish a permanent relationship to oneself. Both were published in 1984, the year of Foucault's death, the second volume being translated in 1985, and the third in 1986.

The fourth volume, Confessions of the Flesh was published posthumously in 2018. Emerging from the planned second volume of his original scheme for the Histoire, the theme of the book were developed in his lecture series from 1979 to 1980 where Foucault extended his analysis of government and biopolitics to its "wider sense of techniques and procedures designed to direct the behaviour of men", which involved a new consideration of the "examination of conscience" and confession in early Christian literature. These themes of early Christian literature seemed to dominate Foucault's work, alongside his study of Greek and Roman literature, until the end of his life. The planned fourth volume of The History of Sexuality was accordingly entitled Confessions of the Flesh (Les aveux de la chair), addressing Christianity.

Foucault's death in 1984 left the work incomplete, and the publication was delayed due to the restrictions of Foucault's estate. The volume was almost finished at the time of his death, and a copy was held in the Foucault archive. The work first became available to researchers when both handwritten and typed manuscripts of Confessions of the Flesh were sold by Daniel Defert, Foucault's partner, to the National Library of France in 2013 as part of the Foucault archive. Foucault's family decided that as the material was already partially accessible, it should be published for everyone to read. It was edited and finally published in February 2018, despite Foucault explicitly disallowing posthumous publication of his works, and was published in English for the first time by Penguin in Feb 2021, translated by Robert Hurley who had translated Penguin's earlier volumes in the series, and was released straight into their Penguin Classics imprint.

== See also ==
- Dispositif
- Foucauldian discourse analysis
- Greek love
- Postsexualism
