= Postsexualism =

Michel Foucault's sexual political views

Postsexualism is understood to mean the French philosopher Michel Foucault's sexual political views influenced by consciously artificial life identities, which is characterized by the escape of the "confessional" structure of sexuality. The term "postsexual" also refers to a broader effort to exceed the "sexual" and "non-sexual" boundaries in culture – either in theoretical considerations or in social practices.

From a postsexual point of view, the division between "sexual" and "non-sexual" is arbitrary, and it is not possible to measure the authenticity of any kind of interactions between people. Therefore, it is central to the postsexual way of life to escape this division and the associated "confessions", or alternatively to criticize this division, and related social confessional rituals by means of irony or parody.

== Postsexual practices ==
The Postgender Association in Finland sought to challenge prevailing sexual classifications by questioning practices. Additionally, to seek recognition, the Postgender Association introduced new concepts intended to call into question so-called normal and natural sexual categories and to make them sound more artificial and perverse. An example of such a concept, which has become internationally recognized, is the term queer heterosexual, which refers to the heterosexual preferences of any person with a politically queer identity and who perceives their heterosexuality as if it were but "one perversion among many others."

Another of the concepts is "homeovestism," which questions the naturalness of heterosexual normativity. Homeovestism refers to a particular sexual preference for "same-sex" clothing, as opposed to cross-dressing. One who identifies as a homeovestite would derive sexual pleasure from clothing and behavior that is considered normative to their "own" gender.
