= The Order of Things =

1966 book by French philosopher Michel Foucault

- Cover of the French edition
- Author: Michel Foucault
- Original title: Les Mots et les Choses – Une archéologie des sciences humaines
- Language: French
- Subject: Human science
- Published: 1966 (Éditions Gallimard); 1970 (Pantheon Books, English); 1970 (Tavistock Publications, UK ed.)
- Publication place: France
- Media type: Print (Hardcover and paperback)
- Pages: 404
- ISBN: 2-07-022484-8
- OCLC: 256703056

The Order of Things: An Archaeology of the Human Sciences (French: Les Mots et les Choses – Une archéologie des sciences humaines) is a 1966 book by French philosopher Michel Foucault. It proposes that every historical period has underlying epistemic assumptions, ways of thinking, which determine what is truth and what is acceptable discourse about a subject, by delineating the origins of biology, economics, and linguistics. The introduction to the origins of the human sciences begins with detailed, forensic analyses and discussion of the complex networks of sightlines, hidden-ness, and representation that exist in the group painting Las Meninas (The Ladies-in-waiting, 1656) by Diego Velázquez. Foucault's application of the analyses shows the structural parallels in the similar developments in perception that occurred in researchers' ways of seeing the subject in the human sciences.

== The concept of episteme ==
In The Order of Things: An Archaeology of the Human Sciences Foucault wrote that a historical period is characterized by epistemes — ways of thinking about truth and about discourse — which are common to the fields of knowledge, and determine what ideas it is possible to conceptualize and what ideas it is acceptable to affirm as true. That the acceptable ideas change and develop in the course of time, manifested as paradigm shifts of intellectualism, for instance between the "Classical Age" and "Modernity" (from Kant onwards) — which is the period considered by Foucault in the book — is support for the thesis that every historical period has underlying epistemic assumptions, ways of thinking that determined what is truth and what is rationally acceptable.

- Concerning language: from general grammar to linguistics
- Concerning living organisms: from natural history to biology
- Concerning money: from the science of wealth to economics

Foucault analyzes three epistemes:

1. The episteme of the Renaissance, characterized by resemblance and similitude
2. The episteme of the Classical era, characterized by representation and ordering, identity and difference, as categorization and taxonomy
3. The episteme of the Modern era, the character of which is the subject of the book

In the Classical-era episteme, the concept of "man" was not yet defined. Man was not subject to a distinct epistemological awareness. Classical thinkers, and thinkers of previous epistems, could talk about the mind and the body, about the human being, and about his very limited place in the universe; they could talk about all the limits of knowledge and his freedom. However, none of them have ever known man as modern thought has done. The humanism of the Renaissance, the rationalism of the "classics" assigned human beings a privileged place in the order of the world, but they did not think of man. This happened only with Kant's Critique of Pure Reason, when the entire Western episteme was overturned. The connection between "positivity and finitude", the duplication of the empirical and the transcendental, the "perpetual reference of the cogito to the unthought", the "retreat and the return of the origin", define, for Foucault, man's way of being, because now reflection tries to philosophically find the possibility of knowledge on the analysis of this way of being and no longer on that of representation.

== Epistemic interpretation ==
Las Meninas (The Ladies-in-waiting, 1656), by Diego Velázquez. (Museo del Prado, Madrid)

The Order of Things (1966) is about the "cognitive status of the modern human sciences" in the production of knowledge — the ways of seeing that researchers apply to a subject under examination. Foucault's introduction to the epistemic origins of the human sciences is a forensic analysis of the painting Las Meninas (The Ladies-in-waiting, 1656), by Diego Velázquez, as an objet d'art. For the detailed descriptions, Foucault uses language that is "neither prescribed by, nor filtered through the various texts of art-historical investigation." Ignoring the 17th-century social context of the painting — the subject (a royal family); the artist's biography, technical acumen, artistic sources and stylistic influences; and the relationship with his patrons (King Philip IV of Spain and Queen Mariana of Austria) — Foucault analyzes the conscious, artistic artifice of Las Meninas as a work of art, to show the network of complex, visual relationships that exist among the painter, the subjects, and the spectator who is viewing the painting:

We are looking at a picture in which the painter is, in turn, looking out at us. A mere confrontation, eyes catching one another's glance, direct looks superimposing themselves upon one another as they cross. And yet, this slender line of reciprocal visibility embraces a whole complex network of uncertainties, exchanges, and feints. The painter is turning his eyes towards us only in so far as we happen to occupy the same position as his subject.

As a representational painting Las Meninas is a new episteme (way of thinking) that is at the midpoint between two "great discontinuities" in European intellectualism, the Classical and the modern: "Perhaps there exists, in this painting by Velázquez, the representation, as it were, of Classical representation, and the definition of the space it opens up to us . . . representation freed, finally, from the relation that was impeding it, can offer itself as representation, in its pure form."

Now he [Velázquez the painter] can be seen, caught in a moment of stillness, at the neutral centre of his oscillation. His dark torso and bright face are half-way between the visible and the invisible: emerging from the canvas, beyond our view, he moves into our gaze; but when, in a moment, he makes a step to the right, removing himself from our gaze, he will be standing exactly in front of the canvas he is painting; he will enter that region where his painting, neglected for an instant, will, for him, become visible once more, free of shadow and free of reticence. As though the painter could not, at the same time, be seen on the picture where he is represented, and also see that upon which he is representing something.

The Order of Things concludes with Foucault's explanation of why he did the forensic analysis:

Let us, if we may, look for [representation] the previously existing law of that interplay in the painting of Las Meninas. . . . In Classical thought, the personage for whom the representation exists, and who represents himself within it, recognizing himself, therein, as an image or reflection, he who ties together all the interlacing threads of the "representation in the form of a picture or table" — he is never to be found in that table himself. Before the end of the eighteenth century, Man did not exist — any more than the potency of life, the fecundity of labour, or the historical density of language. He is a quite recent creature, which the demiurge of knowledge fabricated with its own hands, less than two hundred years ago: but he has grown old so quickly that it has been only too easy to imagine that he had been waiting for thousands of years in the darkness for that moment of illumination in which he would finally be known.

== Influence ==
The critique of epistemic practices presented in The Order of Things: An Archaeology of the Human Sciences expanded and deepened the research methodology of cultural history. Foucault, with his presentation and explanation of cultural shifts in awareness about ways of thinking, prompted the historian of science Theodore Porter to investigate and examine the contemporary bases for the production of knowledge. This yielded a critique of how scientific researchers psychologically project modern categories of knowledge upon past people and things that remain intrinsically unintelligible, despite contemporary historical knowledge of the past under examination.

In France, The Order of Things established Foucault's intellectual pre-eminence among the national intelligentsia; in a review of which, the philosopher Jean-Paul Sartre said that Foucault was "the last barricade of the bourgeoisie." Responding to Sartre, Foucault said, "poor bourgeoisie; if they needed me as a 'barricade', then they had already lost power!" In the book Structuralism (Le Structuralisme, 1968) Jean Piaget compared Foucault's episteme to the concept of paradigm shift, which the philosopher of science Thomas Kuhn presented in The Structure of Scientific Revolutions (1962).

== See also ==
- Le Monde's 100 Books of the Century
- The Archaeology of Knowledge
- dispositif
