= The Archaeology of Knowledge =

1969 book by Michel Foucault

- Author: Michel Foucault
- Original title: L'archéologie du savoir
- Language: French
- Subject: Philosophy
- Genre: Intellectual history
- Publisher: Éditions Gallimard
- Publication date: 1969
- Publication place: France
- Media type: Book
- Pages: 275
- ISBN: 2-07-026999-X
- OCLC: 435143715

The Archaeology of Knowledge (French: L’archéologie du savoir) by Michel Foucault is a 1969 treatise about the methodology and historiography of the systems of thought (epistemes) and of knowledge (discursive formations). Foucault argues that these systems follow hidden rules that shape the limits of language and thought in any period or domain. The archaeology of knowledge is the analytical method that Foucault used in Madness and Civilization: A History of Insanity in the Age of Reason (1961), The Birth of the Clinic: An Archaeology of Medical Perception (1963), and The Order of Things: An Archaeology of the Human Sciences (1966).

== Summary ==
The contemporary study of the history of Ideas concerns the transitions between historical world-views, but ultimately depends upon narrative continuities that break down under close inspection. The history of ideas marks points of discontinuity between broadly defined modes of knowledge, but those existing modes of knowledge are not discrete structures among the complex relations of historical discourse. Discourses emerge and transform according to a complex set of relationships (discursive and institutional) defined by discontinuities and unified themes.

An énoncé (statement) is a discourse, a way of speaking; the methodology studies only the “things said” as emergences and transformations, without speculation about the collective meaning of the statements of the things said. A statement is the set of rules that makes an expression — a phrase, a proposition, an act of speech — into meaningful discourse, and is conceptually different from signification; thus, the expression “The gold mountain is in California” is discursively meaningless if it is unrelated to the geographic reality of California. Therefore, the function of existence is necessary for an énoncé (statement) to have a discursive meaning.

As a set of rules, the statement has special meaning in the archaeology of knowledge, because it is the rules that render an expression discursively meaningful, while the syntax and the semantics are additional rules that make an expression significative. The structures of syntax and the structures of semantics are insufficient to determine the discursive meaning of an expression; whether or not an expression complies with the rules of discursive meaning, a grammatically correct sentence might lack discursive meaning; inversely, a grammatically incorrect sentence might be discursively meaningful; even when a group of letters are combined in such a way that no recognizable lexical item is formulated can possess discursive meaning, e.g. QWERTY identifies a type of keyboard layout for typewriters and computers.

The meaning of an expression depends upon the conditions in which the expression emerges and exists within the discourse of a field or the discourse of a discipline; the discursive meaning of an expression is determined by the statements that precede and follow it. To wit, the énoncés (statements) constitute a network of rules that establish which expressions are discursively meaningful; the rules are the preconditions for signifying propositions, utterances, and acts of speech to have discursive meaning. The analysis then deals with the organized dispersion of statements, discursive formations, and Foucault reiterates that the outlined archaeology of knowledge is one possible method of historical analysis.

== Reception ==
The philosopher Gilles Deleuze describes The Archaeology of Knowledge as, "the most decisive step yet taken in the theory-practice of multiplicities."

== See also ==
- Foucauldian discourse analysis
