= Hanna Mikhail =

Palestinian scholar and activist (1935–unknown)

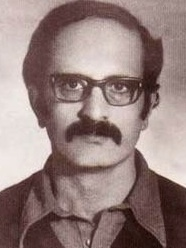
- Born: Hanna Ibrahim Mikhail; 1935; Ramallah, Mandatory Palestine
- Disappeared: 1 July 1976 (aged 41); Lebanon
- Status: Missing for 50 years, 10 months and 14 days
- Other name: Abu Omar
- Education: Haverford College; Harvard University
- Occupation: Academic
- Notable work

Academic background
- Thesis: Politics and Revelation: Mawardi and After
- Doctoral advisor: Nadav Safran

Academic work
- Institutions: Princeton University; University of Washington
- Spouse: Jehan Helou

Hanna Mikhail, nome de guerre Abu Omar, (Arabic: حنا ميخائيل, romanized: Ḥannā Mīḫāʾīl; 1935–unknown) was a Palestinian scholar and a Fatah member who disappeared in 1976.

== Early life and education ==
Mikhail was born in Ramallah, Mandatory Palestine, in 1935. He hailed from a Christian family whose members were part of the Quaker community in Ramallah. Hanan Ashrawi is Hanna's cousin.

Mikhail graduated from the Friends School in Ramallah. Then he went to the US for university education when he got a scholarship. There he obtained a degree in chemistry from Haverford College and his Ph.D. in political science from Harvard University. His thesis was entitled Politics and Revelation: Mawardi and After, and Mikhail's supervisor was the Israeli Orientalist Nadav Safran. It was published by the Edinburgh University Press in 1995. The preface of the book was written by Edward Said. Its Arabic edition was also published.

== Career and activities ==
Following his graduation Mikhail joined Princeton University as a lecturer. He then taught at the University of Washington.

Mikhail left his teaching position in the summer of 1969 and settled in Jordan where he became a member of the Fatah movement. He was part of the left wing of the group. Mikhail was active in the formation of the Palestine Liberation Organization's (PLO) international relations and information departments. He acted as a spokesperson of the Fatah and accompanied foreign journalists visiting the refugee camps, the military bases and camps. He helped the production of an Italian film on the Palestinian resistance movement for which the script was written by Romano Ledda in collaboration with Wael Zwaiter. Mikhail also arranged various conferences, festivals, and collaborative committees and was active in the management of the International Solidarity Camp based in Amman to improve the relations between Western Europeans and the Palestinian revolutionaries.

Mikhail and other PLO members left Jordan in 1971 after the events known as Black September and resided in Beirut. There, Mikhail served at the PLO's Palestinian Research Centre and the Planning Centre. He was made a member of the editorial board of Shu'un Filastiniyya. He was also information adviser to the PLO leader Yasser Arafat.

Mikhail's scholarly work was destroyed during the invasion of Beirut by the Israeli forces in 1982.

== Personal life ==
Mikhail's first wife was an American woman, and they divorced in 1966. He married Jehan Helou in Beirut in 1972. She was also part of the PLO. Their wedding ceremony was officiated by Edward Said's father-in-law, Emile Cortas.

One of Mikhail's close friends was Edward Said. Another was the French writer Jean Genet.

== Disappearance ==
Mikhail was sent by Yasser Arafat to a refugee camp in Tripoli to investigate ongoing turmoil in July 1976. The area was under the control of the Phalange forces. He was accompanied by nine PLO members and two sailors. The group attempted to go to the camp by sea from Beirut. However, the fiberglass boat carrying them went missing. After this incident no news about him has been received.

The case was examined by the International Committee of the Red Cross, but it did not reach a conclusion. It is thought that he was arrested by the Phalange members and murdered by or surrendered to the Syrians. The Christian Science Monitor reported in September 1976 that Mikhail and his companions were secretly imprisoned by either Syrian or the Phalange forces.

== Legacy ==
The PLO gave Mikhail the title of martyr. In Jean Genet's Un captif amoureux (1986; French: Prisoner of Love) the main character is Abu Omar referring to Hanna Mikhail. A seminar entitled Intellectuals and Revolution: On the 40th Anniversary of the Disappearance of Hanna Mikhail (Abu Omar) was organized by the Birzeit University in cooperation with the Institute for Palestine Studies in Birzeit on 22 November 2016.

== See also ==
- List of people who disappeared mysteriously: 1910–1990
- Jean Zaru
