= Rondelet (surname) =

Rondelet is a French surname. Notable people with the surname include:

- Guillaume Rondelet (1507–1566), French professor of medicine
- Jean-Baptiste Rondelet (1743–1829), French architectural theorist
