= Carceral archipelago =

Concept introduced by social theorist Michel Foucault

The concept of a carceral archipelago was first used by the French historian and philosopher Michel Foucault in his 1975 publication, Surveiller et Punir, to describe the modern penal system of the 1970s, embodied by the well-known penal institution at Mettray in France. The phrase combines the adjective "carceral", which means that which is related to jail or prison, with archipelago—a group of islands. Foucault referred to the "island" units of the "archipelago" as a metaphor for the mechanisms, technologies, knowledge systems and networks related to a carceral continuum. The 1973 English publication of the book by Solzhenitsyn called The Gulag Archipelago referred to the forced labor camps and prisons that composed the sprawling carceral network of the Soviet Gulag.

Concepts developed in Foucault's Discipline and Punish have been widely used by researchers in the growing, multi-disciplinary field of "carceral state" studies, as part of the "carceral turn" in the 1990s. Foucault, who died in the 1980s, did not witness the "unparalleled escalation of prison populations" of the carceral state in the United States. In the last quarter of the twentieth century, the incarceration rate in the US increased by a factor of five, reaching an incarceration rate of 1 in 100 by 2008. Until the carceral turn, scholars propose how what they describe as the American mass incarcerations and prison-industrial complex were almost invisible. In 1993, the international criminologist, Nils Christie, who was one of the first to warn of the perceived dangers of the alarming growth and danger of the crime control industry in the United States, compared the size and scope of the industry to Western style gulags.

== Etymology of the term ==
Foucault first used the phrase "carceral archipelago" to describe the penal institution at Mettray, France. Foucault said that Mettray was the "most famous of a whole series of institutions which, well beyond the frontiers of criminal law, constituted what one might call the carceral archipelago." Carceral comes from the Latin "carcer", which means jail or prison and archipelago refers to a group of islands.

"Archipelago", as used by Foucault, refers to Alexander Solzhenitsyn's book, The Gulag Archipelago: An Experiment in Literary Investigation, about the Soviet carceral system of forced labor. The book described the Russian Gulag's vast network of dozens of camps and hundreds of labour colonies scattered across the Soviet Union. The Gulag Archipelago, written between 1958 and 1968, was first published in English in 1974 and was based on Solzhenitsyn's own experience as a prisoner. It has been described as the book that "brought down an empire", the most powerful indictment of a "political regime...in modern times", and "a head-on challenge to the Soviet state."

== Discipline and Punish ==
Foucault was writing Discipline and Punish: The Birth of the Prison in the early 1970s, against the backdrop of prison revolts "throughout the world" that protested a century-old system of cold, suffocation, overcrowding, hunger, physical maltreatment, so-called "model prisons", tranquilizers, and isolation.

As a co-founder of the Groupe d'Information sur les Prisons (GIP)—a group that was active in France for several years in the early 1970s—Foucault was highly critical of the French penal system, believing that it converted petty criminals into hardened delinquents. A year after the GIP folded, Foucault published Discipline and Punish, in which he examined the evolution of the penal system, away from corporal and capital punishment, into the modern carceral system that began in Europe and the United States around the end of the 18th century. His biographer Didier Eribon described Discipline and Punish as "perhaps the finest" of Foucault's works.

Foucault described Discipline and Punish as providing a "historical background" to the "formation of knowledge in modern society". It provides a "history of the modern soul." He provided a "genealogy of the present scientifico-legal complex from which the power to punish derives its bases, justifications and rules." In both Discipline and Punish (1975) and The History of Sexuality (1976), Foucault developed archaeological and genealogical methods which emphasized the role that power plays in society. The carceral network, with its mechanisms of normalizing social control, made the human sciences "historically possible" through its analytical investment into "knowable man"—his "soul, individuality, consciousness, and conduct. Foucault refers to the term "discipline" as used within punitive penal systems. In his 1969 publication, The Archaeology of Knowledge, and again in Discipline and Punish, he investigates the origins of the "disciplines" in the humanities and social sciences. In the chapter on "Science and Knowledge", he suggested that 'disciplines' could be called "groups of statements that borrow their organization from scientific models" that once they were accepted, became "institutionalized, transmitted, and sometimes taught as sciences." He goes on to challenge these disciplines—which he also does in Discipline and Punish—asking "[C]ould one not say that archaeology describes disciplines that are not really sciences, while epistemology describes sciences that have been formed on the basis of (or in spite of) existing disciplines?"

In his final chapter entitled simply "Carceral", Foucault described how, within the penal system, disciplinary networks expanded to include carceral mechanisms and technologies, the carceral city, culture, society, system, and network—that are all part of the carceral archipelago. "Medicine, psychology, education, public assistance", and social work began to assume "judicial functions" with an "ever greater share of the powers of supervision and assessment". Foucault called these disciplines, "mechanisms of normalization" and described them as "becoming ever more rigorous in their application". He said that the knowledge generated by the disciplines of "psychology, psychiatry, pedagogy, criminology, and so many other strange sciences" have a "terrible power of investigation" that developed the technologies and procedures of panopticism.

Foucault described how new forms of punishment in the 19th century became transformed into general techniques and procedures for controlling populations and how twentieth century society normalized social control, through constant and permanent surveillance and monitoring.

American historian, Peter Linebaugh, author of The London Hanged: Crime and Civil Society in the Eighteenth Century wrote that Foucault's "great confinement"—was a contemporary form of "'enclosure', an important interpretative idea for understanding neoliberalism." "Enclosure indicates private property and capital: it seems to promise both individual ownership and social productivity, but in fact the concept of enclosure is inseparable from terror and the destruction of independence and community". In The London Hanged, Linebaugh described how the population in London had become criminalized in the 18th century—"People were so impoverished, they had to steal to survive." As the meaning of property changed, property laws were rewritten.

== From a culture of spectacle to a carceral society ==
In Discipline and Punish, Foucault traced the genealogy of contemporary forms of the penal or carceral system, from the eighteenth century until the mid-1970s in the Western world.

The "culture of spectacle" included public displays of torture, dismemberment, and obliteration of the human body as punishment. Foucault opened Discipline and Punish with a detailed description of the execution of the French citizen, Robert-François Damiens in 1757 as punishment for regicide in a public display of drawing and quartering.

According to Foucault, punishment and the criminal become an integral part of 'western' scientific rationality by the late 18th century. Reformers called for "better punishments. It was based it on a model 'cure' for reforms—to "punish with an attenuated severity perhaps, but in order to punish with more universality and necessity; to insert the power to punish more deeply into the social body." This involved the submission of bodies through the control of ideas and the analysis of representations as a principle in a politics of bodies. Foucault quoted Servan—a member of the influential group called the Idéologues—Parisian intellectuals in the 1790s who developed ideology as a "science of ideas". Servan described how a "true politician" guides citizens by forming a "chain of ideas" on [crime and punishment] that is "strongly linked" with the "stable point of reason" securing the "end of the chain."

By 1810, in France, detention in the large "enclosed, complex and hierarchized structure", had replaced the scaffold as the "essential form of punishment" and punishment was "integrated into the very body of the state apparatus." The modern carceral system, was taking form with the publication by 1838, of books on prison reform by Charles Lucas, Louis-Mathurin Moreau-Christophe, and Léon Faucher. In his book House of Young Prisoners, Faucher prescribed "strict discipline, exact rules, surveillance and rehabilitation". From the late 18th century through the early decades of the 19th century, modern criminal codes were implemented in Europe and North America. By 1838, with the publication of Leon Faucher's book on prison reform, society had transitioned—the public execution was replaced by the "timetable".

The carceral society—in which "punishment and discipline" was "internalized and directed to the constitution and, when necessary, rehabilitation of social subjects"—had replaced the culture of spectacle.

According to Foucault, modern penal theories—including their inherent power structures—originate with the Mettray, a French penal colony for children and youth, that operated from January 22, 1840, until 1937. To Foucault, the carceral system is personified in the French penal institutions like Mettray. Foucault described Mettray as the "most famous of a whole series of institutions which, well beyond the frontiers of criminal law, constituted what one might call the carceral archipelago." These penal systems included the prison, the school, the Church, and the work-house. Foucault said, "Were I to fix the date of completion of the carceral system... [t]he date I would choose would be 22 January 1840, the date of the official opening of Mettray. Or better still, perhaps, that glorious day, unremarked and unrecorded, when a child in Mettray remarked as he lay dying: 'What a pity I left the colony so soon.'"

The body of knowledge based on prisoners in institutions, such as Mettray and Neufchatel, was the origin of the concept of the "delinquent" class. In his discussion on illegalities and delinquency, Foucault illustrated how "programmes for correcting delinquents" and "mechanisms that reinforce delinquency" were are all part of the carceral system that "combines discourses, architectures, regulations and scientific propositions, and social effects." Foucault described three characters caught in this system, Eugène François Vidocq, (Note: Vidocq, was a former criminal who became the first director of the crime-detection Sûreté nationale and the head of the first known private detective agency. Victor Hugo, Edgar Allan Poe, and Honoré de Balzac wrote about Vidocq's life story. He is considered to be the father of modern criminology.) Pierre François Lacenaire (1803 – 1836), and a 13-year-old charged with vagabondage who was sentenced to two years in a reformatory. Vidocq's contemporary, Lecenaire, was the typical "delinquent" according to what the dominant class considered to constitute delinquency, in the first third of the nineteenth century.

=== Panopticon to panopticism in a carceral culture ===
By "carceral culture, Foucault refers to a culture in which the panoptic model of surveillance has been diffused as a principle of social organization."

Foucault used Jeremy Bentham's prison reforms, which included architectural plans for the Panopticon as a "representative model for what happens to society in the nineteenth century." Although few of Bentham's Panopticon's were actually built, his plans included a central tower with individual cells that prevent interaction with each other while being constantly under the gaze of the panoptic tower, which can "pan" and see everything. Foucault quoted a 19th-century legal scholar who argued that Bentham's design was an event 'in the history of the human mind'. It was the "birth certificate" of "disciplinary society". Foucault said that the idea of the Panopticon became used in many different settings in diverse ways, including the university classroom, prison schools, some classroom auditoriums, hospital and factory architecture and in "urban planning—organized on a grid structure to facilitate movement but also to discourage concealment."

The Panopticon is "an architectural plan", while panopticism is a "set of general ideas about the control of populations".

In the chapter entitled, Panopticism, Foucault argued that the procedures and technology for the control of the plague established around 1700 became a template for a more general form of social control. In order to control the plague, a village was sequestered and every street was put under constant surveillance. The plague, he says, "stands for all forms of confusion and disorder".

Foucault explains how the "panoptic schema, without disappearing as such or losing any of its properties, was destined to spread throughout the social body" and to "become a generalized function." "We are neither in the amphitheatre, nor on the stage, but in the panoptic machine, invested by its effects of power, which we bring to ourselves since we are part of its mechanism."

=== Beyond panoptic forms of control ===
In his work after Discipline and Punish, Foucault became interested in a related question. Instead of looking at panoptic forms of control, he became interested in how people use information to think about themselves. He sometimes referred to this as a study of 'ethics', other times he used the grander title: 'technologies of the self'. Foucault studied two related issues: what information was on hand and what people chose to do with the information. In many ways, this took him in a new direction, suggesting perhaps ways of living in the carceral archipelago without striving to escape from it.

Foucault elaborated the notion of Biopower and Biopolitics to describe the practice of modern nation states and their regulation of their subjects through "an explosion of numerous and diverse techniques for achieving the subjugations of bodies and the control of populations". Biopower refers to a "set of mechanisms through which the basic biological features of the human species became the object of a political strategy, of a general strategy of power." "Starting from the 18th century, modern Western societies took on board the fundamental biological fact that human beings are a species." Foucault called this phenomenon biopower. In contemporary US political science studies, poststructuralists use "biopower" to denote social and political power over life.

== The carceral state ==
In the 1960s, 1970s, and 1980s prisoner coalitions — including the Chicano Movement and Black Power organizations — in American prisons protested together under the banner of "slaves of the state". Their legal challenge to prison conditions was successful. In response, the state introduced a "new prison regime" with paramilitary equipment and practices, the increased use of privatized prisons, "massive prison building programs", and new levels of punishment, such as "23-hour cell isolation". Author Robert Chase called this the "'Sunbelt' militarized carceral state approach that became exemplary of national prison trends."

Nils Christie, a criminology professor at the University of Oslo in Norway, in his 1993 book Crime control as industry: towards gulags, Western style? - a modern classic of criminology - argued that crime control was more dangerous to societal future than crime itself. In his 1994 review of Crime control as industry, Andrew Rutherford described Christie as a criminologist of "international renown", who has written prolifically about punishment and the role of law for decades. Rutherford said that Christie "exemplified the enlightened humanist tradition" and called for criminal law with a "minimalist intervention". Rutherford said that Christie's writing had become much "darker" by 1993, as he warned of the "rapaciously devouring crime control industry" particularly in the United States. In a reference to Foucault's "Great Confinement" in Discipline and Punish, Christie says that these "new great confinements" are part of an "unparalleled escalation of prison populations" with "combat-style probation officers", and "widespread privatization" of prisons.

In her widely cited 2006 book, The Prison and the Gallows: The Politics of Mass Incarceration in America, Marie Gottschalk, an American political scientist and professor of political science at the University of Pennsylvania, traced the origins and construction of the carceral state in the United States from the 1920s through the 1960s. In The Prison and the Gallows she made reference to Foucault's "carceral archipelago". She described how

"a tenacious carceral state has sprouted in the shadows of mass imprisonment and has been extending its reach far beyond the prison gate. It includes not only the country’s vast archipelago of jails and prisons, but also the far-reaching and growing penal punishments and controls that lies in the never-never land between the prison gate and full citizenship. As it sunders families and communities and radically reworks conceptions of democracy, rights, and citizenship, the carceral state poses a formidable political and social challenge."

She said that until the carceral turn in the social sciences in the late 1990s, "mass imprisonment was largely an invisible issue in the United States". By 2014, there was widespread criticism of mass incarceration but very modest reform.

According to Ruth Wilson Gilmore, a geographer, whose 2007 book entitled, Golden Gulag: Prisons, Surplus, Crisis, and Opposition in Globalizing California, in 2007, California had the largest prison-population in the United States. Gilmore, who co-founded Critical Resistance (an U.S.-based prison-abolition group), links carceral policies to economic and social factors. She described the nine-hundred miles of prisons along "prison alley" with "old and new prisons" clustered along California Highway 99, on land that was once farmlands. She called it an "archipelago of concrete and steel cages" with 33 "major" and 57 minor prisons. Forty-three of these prisons were constructed after 1984. Brett Story, who wrote and directed the 2017 feature documentary The Prison in Twelve Landscapes, also wrote the book Prison Land: Mapping Carceral Power across Neoliberal America. In Prison Land, Story says that carceral space "stretches into the ordinary—where people gather in "courtrooms and in mess halls, in visiting centers, at public defenders' offices, and on visitors' buses that take care givers to and from "prison visiting centers that dot the carceral landscape."

Both Gilmore and Gottschalk are "established in their fields"; their ideas and assumptions reflect their home disciplines and not necessarily those of criminology, for example. The interdisciplinary field of carceral-state scholarship began to emerge in the 1970s in the United States as a critique of the penal system. Carceral-state scholarship, an area of study whose "boundaries are notoriously difficult to map", includes "cognate disciplines" such as history and sociology, as well as critical theory, journalism and literature.

Foucault's Discipline and Punish has been a critical work for those whose work on geographies of power examines how the state uses detention and confinement to exclude populations. Geographer Anne Bonds investigated how social and criminal justice policies had become "increasingly punitive" as class and race inequalities became more entrenched. She argued that discourse on the poor obscures how poverty is produced or increased because of the "neoliberal restructuring of rural economies and governance".

By 2017, the concept of a penal or carceral state - with varying definitions and parameters - had become widely used in "punishment and criminal justice literature".

According to a 2017 article in Theoretical criminology, the carceral state is far from being a "single, unified, and actor-less state responsible for punishment". As a result, the phrase, the carceral state, has a "proliferation of meanings and is frequently undefined."

According to Dan Berger, author of The Struggle Within: Prisons, Political Prisoners, and Mass Movements in the United States (2014), the phrases "carceral state", "mass incarceration", and "prison-industrial complex" are sometimes interchanged and are frequently used by scholars in the field without providing clear definitions of their meaning. They describe the "brutal history of extreme state punishment" in the United States that has led to an exponential increase in the number of incarcerated individuals in the United States since the mid-1970s. With a U.S. incarceration rate of 1 in 100, (Note: "In 2008, the Pew Center on the States reported that incarceration levels had risen to a point where one in 100 American adults was behind bars. A second Pew study the following year added another disturbing dimension to the picture, revealing that one in 31 adults in the United States was either incarcerated or on probation or parole.") the United States has imprisoned more of its citizens than any other Western democracy. Its prison population represents 25 percent of global incarceration. According to Berger, while there is much disagreement about the definition of the term "carceral state", analyses of the topic all agree "that the United States has a lot of people in prison, that a disproportionate number of them are people of color, that police exert too much power with too much weaponry, and that the country's prison system is held together by an overriding investment in harsh and degrading punishment."

For geographers Stefano Bloch and Enrique Olivares-Pelayo and sociologists Loïc Wacquant, Robert Weide, and Patrick Lopez-Aguado, the Carceral State maintains racial segregation as part of enforcing prison control.

== See also ==
- Police state
- Prison-industrial complex
- Prison of the peoples
- Surveillance
