= Poison (1991 film) =

1991 film by Todd Haynes

- DVD cover
- Directed by: Todd Haynes
- Screenplay by: Todd Haynes
- Based on: Three novels by Jean Genet: Our Lady of the Flowers (1943); Miracle of the Rose (1946); Thief's Journal (1949)
- Produced by: Christine Vachon
- Starring: Edith Meeks; Larry Maxwell; Susan Gayle Norman; Scott Renderer; John Leguizamo; James Lyons
- Narrated by: Richard Hansen
- Cinematography: Maryse Alberti
- Edited by: Todd Haynes; James Lyons
- Music by: James Bennett
- Production companies: Killer Films; Bronze Eye Productions
- Distributed by: Zeitgeist Films
- Release dates: January 11, 1991 (Sundance); April 5, 1991 (United States)
- Running time: 85 minutes
- Country: United States
- Language: English
- Budget: $250,000
- Box office: $787,280

Poison is a 1991 American science fiction drama horror film written and directed by Todd Haynes, starring Edith Meeks, Larry Maxwell, Susan Gayle Norman, Scott Renderer, and James Lyons.

Composed of three intercut narratives inspired by the novels of Jean Genet, the gay themes in Poison marked an emerging "queer new wave" in cinema. The film received generally positive reviews.

== Plot ==
Three stories intertwine throughout the film, named in the closing credits:

- Hero: A seven-year-old, Richie Beacon, shoots his abusive father and then flies away, depicted in the style of a 1980s tabloid television news magazine.
- Horror: A scientist, Dr. Graves, isolates the "elixir of human sexuality" and, after drinking it, is transformed into a murderous leper, portrayed in the style of a psychotropic 1960s sci-fi horror B movie.
- Homo: A prisoner, John Broom finds himself attracted to another inmate, reunited after meeting as youth in a juvenile facility, with scenes alternating between a gritty prison film and recollections evoked as pastoral fantasy.

This film is a work of experimental, transgressive fiction, which lacks a clear plot, but brings up themes of isolation, violence, and social rejection, and, in the case of “Homo”, homosexuality. There is also an implicit critique of the role of media in editing and denaturing reality, through the juxtapositions of three narrative styles: newscasts, horror movies, and melodrama.

In “Hero”, Richie Beacon is bullied by those his age, beaten by his father, and then pathologized by his community during talking heads interview segments. In “Horror”, Dr. Graves is chased out of town by an angry mob. In “Homo”, John Broom falls into an intense, consuming relationship with a fellow inmate named Jack Bolton.

The movie closes with a quote from Jean Genet's Funeral Rights: “A man must dream a long time in order to act with grandeur, and dreaming is nursed in darkness.”

== Cast ==
Segment: Hero

- Edith Meeks as Felicia Beacon
- Millie White as Millie Sklar
- Buck Smith as Gregory Lazar
- Anne Giotta as Evelyn McAlpert
- Lydia Lafleur as Sylvia Manning
- Ian Nemser as Sean White
- Rob LaBelle as Jay Wete
- Evan Dunsky as Dr. MacArthur
- Marina Lutz as Hazel Lamprecht
- Barry Cassidy as Officer Rilt
- Richard Anthony as Edward Comacho
- Angela M. Schreiber as Florence Giddens

Segment: Horror

- Larry Maxwell as Dr. Graves
- Susan Gayle Norman as Dr. Nancy Olsen
- Al Quagliata as Deputy Hansen

Segment: Homo

- Scott Renderer as John Broom
- James Lyons as Jack Bolton
- John R. Lombardi as Rass
- Tony Pemberton as Young Broom
- Andrew Harpending as Young Bolton
- John Leguizamo (credited 'Damien Garcia') as Chanchi

== Conception ==
Each section is loosely inspired by a work of French writer Jean Genet. Most notably, "Homo" is a from the 1946 semi-autobiographical book Miracle of the Rose and its non-linear writing style.

== Themes ==
=== Queerness and Politics ===
In both Hero and Homo, Poison directly creates a connection between Queerness and what is perceived as criminal. Film critic Jonathan Rosenbaum, in his 1991 review of the film for the Chicago Reader, interpreted the film's first line, "The whole world is dying of a panicky fright", as part of its social critiques.

Jean Genet's influence on the film is also a part of this usage of crime as a theme, with Homo being a loose adaptation of the Jean Genet novel The Miracle of the Rose. Genet frequently wrote about the sexual elements to crime and the sexual impulses behind it, writing, "I was hot for crime." In an interview with Film Quarterly in 1993, Haynes stated, on Genet's influence: “Genet wrote about a strangely united political and erotic charge that he experienced with regard to homosexuality that was violent, that was based on upsetting the norm and not about finding a nice safe space that society will give you.”

=== HIV/AIDS and the Body ===
The story of Horror has been interpreted by many scholars as a direct allegory for the HIV/AIDS epidemic: Dr. Graves, the scientist at its core, becomes a social pariah and stigmatized after becoming infected, connecting this illness, stigmatization, and his sexuality. Rosenbaum wrote that the film in its entirety can be seen as a direct allusion to HIV/AIDS, and other scholars have noted that the wedding scene in Homo and its inclusion of exchanging fluids could also be taken as a direct reference to the contraction of HIV/AIDS.

Throughout the film, the body of each of the stories core figures is also central to the plot itself. Outside of Horror's direct exploration of body horror and the morphing of one's body, Homo's portrayals of sexuality and exploration of the male body is through trapped men and their bodies in prison, and the main character of Richie's flying out the window in Hero can be interpreted as a sort of escaping from one's body.

=== Acceptance and Rejection ===
Despite rejection from wider society, each story has a character who is able to persist as long as they do thanks to the acceptance of them as they are by an individual. While "Horror" and "Homo" do this through romantic and/or sexual love, their stories both end in tragic ways. However, Richie, the child, experiences unbridled love and acceptance by his mother. Once he kills his abusive father, his mother still calls him her "baby." It is only after this that Richie is able to fly away, and his mother becomes his steadfast defender in the documentary segments. The final scene depicts the moment Richie flies away from a first person point of view, leaving the viewing with a bittersweet but hopeful ending to the child's story.

== Release ==
After a world premiere at the Sundance Film Festival on January 11, 1991, Zeitgeist Films acquired distribution rights, giving Poison a limited release starting April 5, 1991. The Motion Picture Association of America gave the movie an NC-17 rating due to its "explicit sexuality" with some critics even calling it "soft-porn"

=== Controversy ===
U.S. culture war conservatives such as Senator Jesse Helms and Rev. Donald Wildmon of the American Family Association denounced the "explicit porno scenes of homosexuals involved in anal sex". It also received controversy as the National Endowment for the Arts, an independent government agency, donated $25,000 towards the cost of editing. Then chairman of the NEA, John Frohnmayer, defended the movie as "the work of a serious artist."

== Reception ==
The film received generally positive reviews. On the review aggregator website Rotten Tomatoes, 80% of 25 critics' reviews are positive, with an average rating of 7.3/10. The website's consensus reads: "Claustrophobic and quirky horror, this is a decently dirty debut for director Todd Haynes." Metacritic, which uses a weighted average, assigned the film a score of 67 out of 100, based on 18 critics, indicating "generally favorable" reviews.

== Awards and nominations ==
- Berlin International Film Festival Teddy Award for Best Feature Film, 1991 (winner)
- Fantasporto Critics' Award, 1992 (winner); International Fantasy Film Award Best Film, 1992 (nominated)
- Independent Spirit Awards Best Director, 1992 (nominated); Best First Feature, 1992 (nominated)
- Locarno International Film Festival Golden Leopard, 1991 (nominated)
- Sitges - Catalan International Film Festival Special Prize of the Jury, 1991, "For keeping the subversive values inherent to any genuine poetry in force"
- Sundance Film Festival Grand Jury Prize - Dramatic, 1991 (winner)

Awards
| Preceded by Chameleon Street | Sundance Grand Jury Prize: U.S. Dramatic; 1991 | Succeeded by In the Soup |
