= Criminal menopause =

Theory about age and anti-social behavior

Criminal menopause is an informal term describing a decrease in anti-social behavior that correlates with human aging. In the United States, for example, people over 60 years are responsible for less than one percent of crime. Another study found that only two percent of convicts paroled after age 55 are ever imprisoned again. The term criminal menopause alludes the human female biological process of menopause, in which ovulation and menstruation slow and then cease, eventually resulting in natural infecundity. There is no generally accepted method for assessing whether or not a convicted criminal has entered a state of criminal menopause.

Marie Gottschalk writes in Caught: The Prison State and the Lockdown of American Politics:

The evidence that people age out of crime is compelling. Researchers have persistently found that age is one of the most important predictors of criminality. Criminal activity tends to peak in late adolescence or early adulthood and then declines as a person ages, a process that some have termed criminal menopause. Finally, many lifers are first-time offenders convicted of homicide. The phrase one, then done is commonly used to sum up their criminal proclivities.

According to the author of a Los Angeles Review of Books article on prison reform in California, "Ed Bunker, the celebrated novelist who spent 18 years behind bars, including a stint in San Quentin as the youngest prisoner ever to enter the institution, would always tell me: 'crime is a young man's game.'"

There is a complicated moral, financial and social calculus to be made by states that hold large populations of aging criminals. The country of the United States is expected to have 400,000 elderly incarcerated people by 2030. One study found that the recidivism rate of ex-convicts who had served more than 25 years of prison time was "essentially zero." In 1992 a manager of Louisiana's Department of Public Safety and Corrections recommending releasing prisoners over 45 years of age who had already served 20 or more years. In 2010, a 90-year-old man who bludgeoned to death his 89-year-old wife was said the defy "the theories about criminal menopause."

== See also ==
- Frontal lobe
