= Claire Deluca =

French actress (1933–2020)

- Born: 5 June 1933
- Died: 7 April 2020 (aged 86); Paris, France
- Occupations: Actress, theatre director

Claire Deluca (5 June 1933 – 7 April 2020) was a French actress and director.

== Career ==
Deluca acted in several plays written by Marguerite Duras, such as Les Eaux et Forêts, La Musica, Yes, peut-être, and Le Shaga. She also adapted a theatrical adaptation of La Vie matérielle. She won the Prix d'interprétation féminine at the Festival de Barcelona for her role in La Musica.

In 1993, Deluca participated in the Centre culturel international de Cerisy-la-Salle's dedication to Marguerite Duras. The following year, she contributed to the Comédie-Française by recounting memories of Le Shaga rehearsals in 1967 at Neauphle-le-Château.

In 2008, she offered a lecture-spectacle of Le Shaga at the Théâtre du Temps. She directed the play in 2011 at the Théâtre de l'Athénée alongside Jean-Marie Lehec and Karine Martin-Hulewicz. She became a member of the judicial committee for the Prix Marguerite-Duras.

== Personal life ==
On 7 April 2020, Deluca died in Paris, France, at the age of 86.

== Theatre ==
- Et jusqu'à Béthanie (1963)
- Les Eaux et Forêts (1965–1989)
- The Brothers Karamazov (1967)
- The Devil and the Good Lord (1968)
- Yes, peut-être (1968)
- Quelque chose comme Glenariff (1969)
- The Mousetrap (1970–1971)
- Clérambard (1972)
- Antigone (1974)
- Les Larbins (1974)
- La Belle Vie (1977)
- À la nuit, la nuit (1979)
- Deburau (1980–1982)
- Le Paradis à l'amiable (1983)
- Les illes de la voix (1989)
- Héritage (1992)
- Le Shaga (2011)
- La Vie qui va (2013)
