= List of awards and nominations received by Todd Haynes =

List of Todd Haynes awards
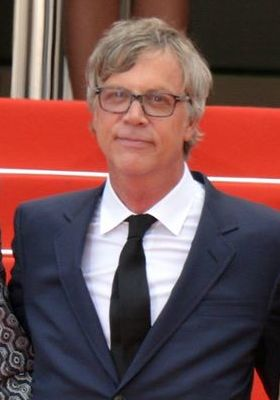
Award	Wins	Nominations
Academy Awards	0	1
British Academy Film Awards	0	1
Golden Globe Awards	0	2
Independent Spirit Awards	2	9
Primetime Emmy Awards	0	3

Todd Haynes is an American filmmaker.

Haynes is known for directing such films as Velvet Goldmine (1998), Far from Heaven (2002), I'm Not There (2007), Carol (2015) and Wonderstruck (2017).

He has received nominations from the Academy Awards, British Academy Film Awards, Golden Globe Awards, and Independent Spirit Awards for his film work. He also received three Primetime Emmy Award nominations for his HBO limited series Mildred Pierce (2011)

His films have also premiered and competed at the Berlin International Film Festival, Cannes Film Festival, Sundance Film Festival, and Venice International Film Festival.

In 2024, Haynes was named Wilde Artist of the Year by GALECA: The Society of LGBTQ Entertainment Critics via the group's Dorian Awards. He had previously received the honor, which goes to "a truly groundbreaking force in entertainment," in 2016.

== Major associations ==
=== Academy Awards ===
Year	Category	Nominated work	Result	Ref.
2002	Best Original Screenplay	Far from Heaven	Nominated	

=== British Academy Film Awards ===
Year	Category	Nominated work	Result	Ref.
2015	Best Director	Carol	Nominated	

=== Golden Globe Awards ===
Year	Category	Nominated work	Result	Ref.
2002	Best Screenplay	Far from Heaven	Nominated	
2015	Best Director	Carol	Nominated	

=== Independent Spirit Award ===
Year	Category	Nominated work	Result
1991	Best First Feature	Poison	Nominated
1991	Best Director	Poison	Nominated
1995	Best Director	Safe	Nominated
1995	Best Screenplay	Safe	Nominated
1998	Best Director	Velvet Goldmine	Nominated
2002	Best Director	Far From Heaven	Won
2007	Best Director	I'm Not There	Nominated
2007	Robert Altman Award	I'm Not There	Won
2015	Best Director	Carol	Nominated
2024	Best Director	May December	Nominated

=== Primetime Emmy Awards ===
Year	Category	Nominated work	Result	Ref.
2011	Outstanding Limited Series	Mildred Pierce	Nominated	
2011	Outstanding Directing for a Limited Series	Mildred Pierce	Nominated	
2011	Outstanding Writing for a Limited Series	Mildred Pierce	Nominated	

== Festival awards ==
=== Berlin Film Festival ===
Year	Category	Nominated work	Result	Ref.
1991	Teddy Award - Best Feature Film	Poison	Won	
2025	Teddy Award - Special Award	—N/a	Honored	

=== Cannes Film Festival ===
Year	Category	Nominated work	Result	Ref.
1998	Palme d'Or	Velvet Goldmine	Nominated	
1998	Best Artistic Contribution	Velvet Goldmine	Won	
2015	Queer Palm	Carol	Won	
2015	Palme d'Or	Carol	Nominated	
2017	Palme d'Or	Wonderstruck	Nominated	
2023	Palme d'Or	May December	Nominated	
2025	Carrosse d’Or	—N/a	Honored	

=== Sundance Film Festival ===
Year	Category	Nominated work	Result	Ref.
1991	Grand Jury Prize – Dramatic	Poison	Won	

=== Venice Film Festival ===
Year	Category	Nominated work	Result	Ref.
2002	Golden Lion	Far From Heaven	Nominated	
2002	SIGNIS Award	Far From Heaven	Won	
2007	Golden Lion	I'm Not There	Nominated	
2007	Queer Lion	I'm Not There	Nominated	
2007	Special Jury Prize	I'm Not There	Won	
2007	CinemAvvenire Award	I'm Not There	Won	

== Critics awards ==
List of accolades
Year	Award	Work	Result	Ref(s)
1995	Seattle International Film Festival American Independent Award	Safe	Won	
2002	New York Film Critics Circle Award for Best Director	Far from Heaven	Won	
2015	Alliance of Women Film Journalists EDA Award for Best Director	Carol	Nominated	
2015	Austin Film Critics Association Award for Best Director	Carol	Nominated	
2015	Boston Society of Film Critics Award for Best Director	Carol	Won	
2015	Chicago Film Critics Association Award for Best Director	Carol	Nominated	
2015	Critics' Choice Movie Award for Best Director	Carol	Nominated	
2015	Dallas-Fort Worth Film Critics Association Award for Best Director	Carol	Nominated	
2015	Florida Film Critics Circle Award for Best Director	Carol	Nominated	
2015	GALECA: The Society of LGBTQ Entertainment Critics Dorian Awards for Director of the Year and Wilde Artist of the Year	Carol	Won	
2015	London Film Critics' Circle Award for Director of the Year	Carol	Nominated	
2015	Los Angeles Film Critics Association Award for Best Director	Carol	Runner-up	
2015	National Society of Film Critics Award for Best Director	Carol	Won	
2015	New York Film Critics Circle Award for Best Director	Carol	Won	
2015	Online Film Critics Society Award for Best Director	Carol	Nominated	
2015	San Francisco Film Critics Circle Award for Best Director	Carol	Nominated	
2015	St. Louis Film Critics Association Award for Best Director	Carol	Nominated	
2015	Toronto Film Critics Association Award for Best Director	Carol	Won	
2015	Vancouver Film Critics Circle Award for Best Director	Carol	Nominated	
2015	Washington D.C. Area Film Critics Association Award for Best Director	Carol	Nominated	
2024	GALECA: The Society of LGBTQ Entertainment Critics Dorian Awards for Director of the Year	May December	Nominated	
