= Guillaume-Abel Blouet =

French architect (1795–1853)

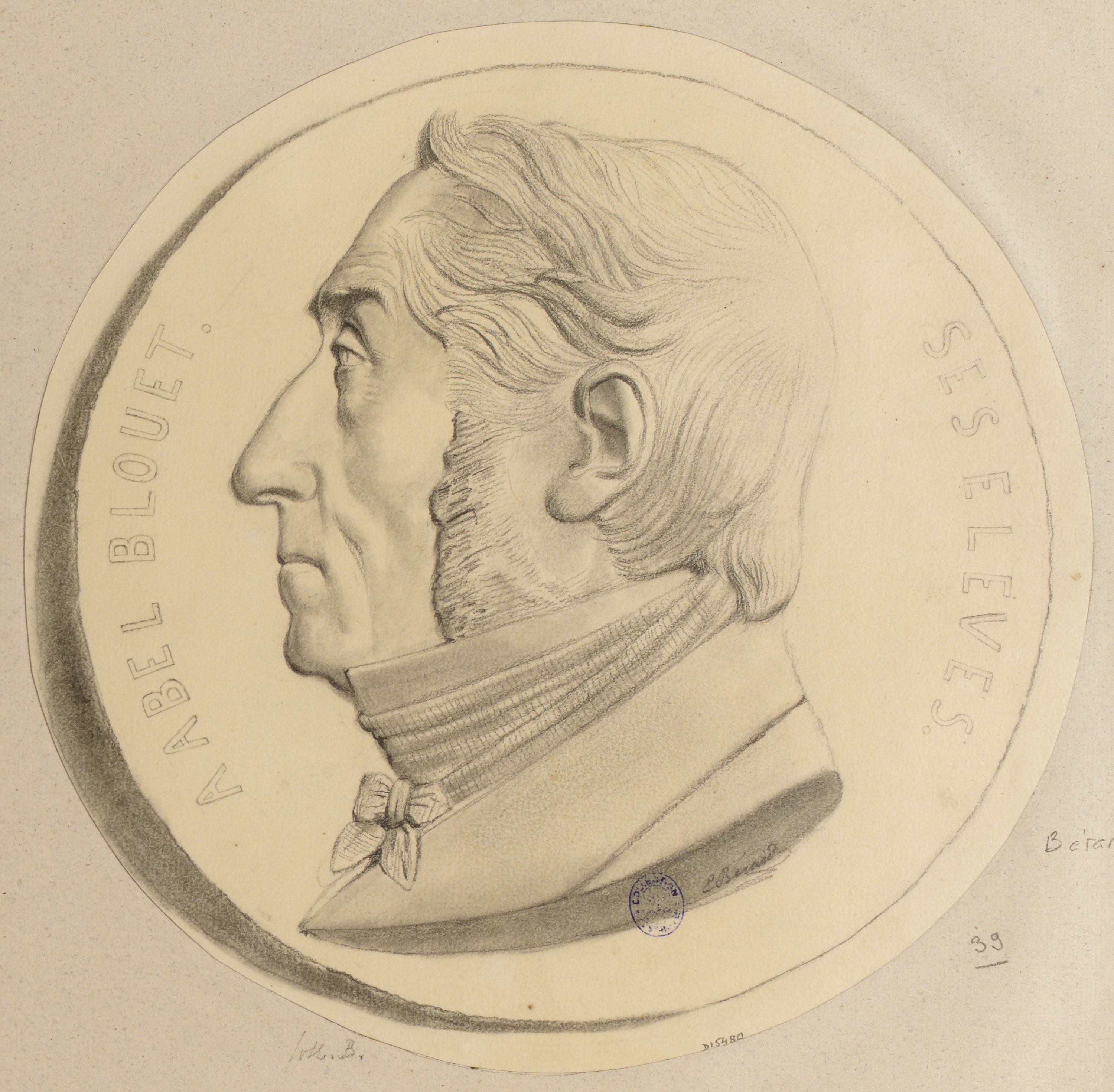
Guillaume-Abel Blouet

Guillaume-Abel Blouet (French pronunciation: [ɡijom abɛl bluɛ]; 6 October 1795 – 7 May 1853) was a French architect.

== Biography ==
Blouet was born at Passy. He won the Grand Prix de Rome in 1821 at the École des Beaux-Arts, entitling him to five years of study at the French Academy in Rome. The study of Roman architecture that was expected from students at the French Academy at Rome resulted in his speculative restoration of the original construction of the Baths of Caracalla, Restauration des thermes d'Antonin Caracalla, à Rome, présentée en 1826 et dédiée en 1827 à l'Académie des Beaux-Arts (1828).

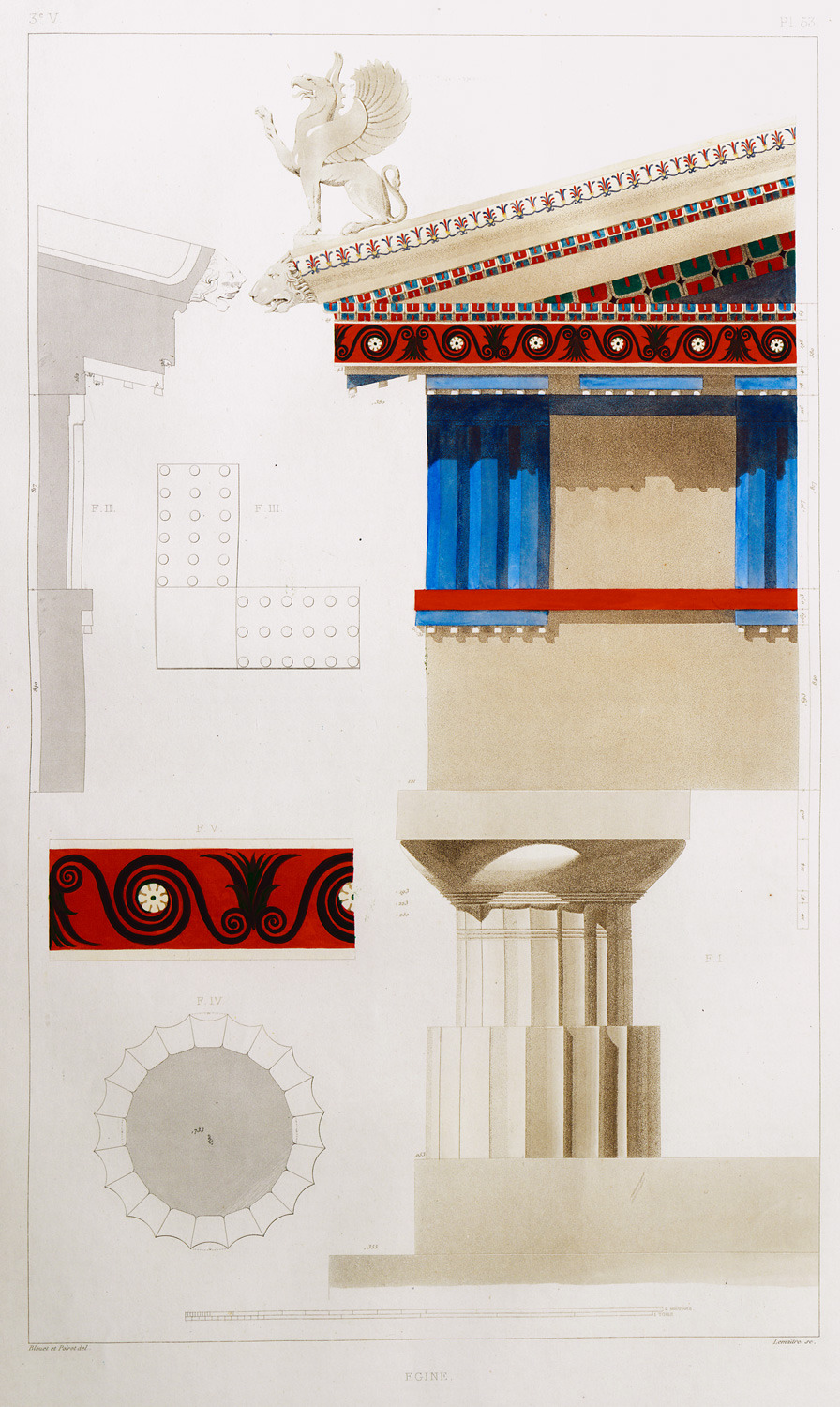
Morea expedition (1828–1833): Temple of Jupiter Panhellenius

The Institut de France appointed Blouet the head of the fine arts section of the French Morea expedition 1828–1833, the second of three great military-scientific expeditions led by France in the first half of the 19th century, in which geologists and antiquarians accompanied an expedition with military objectives, in this case to deport all Ottoman nationals from the Morea, a turning-point in the Greek War of Independence. In the course of the expedition he established the identity of the Temple of Zeus at Olympia (1829), which was measured and carefully drawn and published.

Having overseen the completion of the Arc de Triomphe (1831–36), he toured the United States in 1836, together with Frédéric-Auguste Demetz, a penal reformer and lawyer at the French Royal Court, to study American prison architecture and administration for the French Ministry of the Interior.

Upon Blouet's return to Paris he devoted himself to the reform of prison design and in 1838 was appointed to the new post of Inspector General of French Prisons, which brought with it, ex officio, a seat on the Conseil des bâtiments civiles, the official national body that succeeded the Bâtiments du Roi of the Ancien Régime. Blouet believed in using architecture to realize social reform and together with Demetz worked on the design and layout of the buildings for the Mettray Penal Colony, an agricultural reform school, which was initially directed by Demetz after its opening in July 1839. It was noted as being officially opened on 22 January 1840.

In 1846 he was appointed a professor at the École nationale supérieure des Beaux-Arts, where his pupils included Jules Pellechet. In 1848, when his post of Inspector General of Prisons was eliminated in a reorganization, he was given in compensation the position of architect in charge of the Palais de Fontainebleau, which was to be a center of court life under the French Second Empire. He revised and completed the Traité théorique et pratique de l'art de bâtir of Jean-Baptiste Rondelet (1847). He was elected to the Académie des Beaux-Arts in 1850.

He died in Paris in 1853.

== Principal publications ==
- Restauration des thermes d'Antonin Caracalla, à Rome, présentée en 1826 et dédiée en 1827 à l'Académie des Beaux-Arts (1828)
- Expedition scientifique de Morée ordonnée par le Gouvernement Français; Architecture, Sculptures, Inscriptions et Vues du Péloponèse, des Cyclades et de l'Attique, mesurées, dessinées, recueillies et publiées (Abel Blouet, with Amable Ravoisié, Achille Poirot, Félix Trézel and Frédéric de Gournay) (3 volumes, 1831–1838)
- Rapports à M. le Comte de Montalivet, sur les pénitenciers des États-Unis, by Frédéric-Auguste Demetz and Abel Blouet (1837)
- Chutes du Niagara (Niagara Falls), drawn from nature in March 1837 by A. Blouet, lithographed by C. Remond (1838)
- Instruction Et Programme Pour La Construction Des Maisons D'Arrêt Et De Justice: Atlas De Plans De Prisons Cellulaires by Abel Blouet, Romain Harou and Hector Horeau (1841)
- Projet de prison cellulaire pour 585 condamnés, précédé d'Observations sur le système pénitentiaire (1843) The design had been shown at the Paris Salon of 1843
- Traité théorique et pratique de l'art de bâtir by Jean-Baptiste Rondelet, 5 volumes (1802–1817). Supplément (plates) by G.-Abel Blouet (1847)
