= Our Lady of the Flowers =

1943 debut novel by Jean Genet

- Author: Jean Genet
- Original title: Notre Dame des Fleurs
- Translator: Bernard Frechtman
- Language: French
- Genre: Roman à clef
- Publisher: Marc Barbezat – L'Arbalete (Original French), Editions Paul Morbien (English Translation)
- Publication date: 1943
- Publication place: France
- English publication date: 1949
- Media type: Print
- ISBN: 0-571-25115-3
- Followed by: The Miracle of the Rose

Our Lady of the Flowers (Notre-Dame-des-Fleurs) is the debut novel of French writer Jean Genet, first published in 1943. The free-flowing, poetic novel is a largely autobiographical account of a man's journey through the Parisian underworld. The characters are drawn after their real-life counterparts, who are mostly homosexuals living on the fringes of society.

== Plot summary ==
The novel tells the story of Divine, a transvestite who, when the novel opens, has died of tuberculosis and been canonised as a result. The narrator tells us that the stories he is telling are mainly to amuse himself whilst he passes his sentence in prison –and the highly erotic, often explicitly sexual, stories are spun to assist his masturbation. Jean-Paul Sartre called it "the epic of masturbation".

Divine lives in an attic room overlooking Montmartre cemetery, which she shares with various lovers, the most important of whom is a pimp called Darling Daintyfoot ("Mignon-les-Petits-Pieds" in French). One day Darling brings home a young hoodlum and murderer, dubbed Our Lady of the Flowers. Our Lady is eventually arrested, tried, and executed. Death and ecstasy accompany the acts of every character; Genet performs a transvaluation of all values, making betrayal the highest moral value and murder an act of virtue and sexual appeal.

== Publication history and reception ==
Our Lady of the Flowers was written in prison. Genet wrote it on sheets of brown paper which prison authorities provided to prisoners – with the intention that they would make bags of it. As recounted by Sartre in his foreword to Our Lady of the Flowers, a prison guard discovered that the prisoner Genet had been making this "unauthorized" use of the paper, confiscated the manuscript and burned it. Undaunted, Genet wrote it all over again. The second version survived and Genet took it with him when leaving the prison.

Largely completed in 1942, the book was first published anonymously by Robert Denoël and Paul Moribien at the end of 1943, though only about 30 copies of the first edition were bound in that year (most began to be bound and sold in August 1944, during the Liberation). The first printing was designed for sale to well-to-do collectors of erotica; it circulated by private sales lists and under the counter. But Genet never intended his work as mere pornography and later excised more graphic passages. In November 1943, he sent a copy of the first printing to Marc Barbezat, publisher of the literary journal L'Arbalete, who published the book in 1944 and again in 1948. Genet revised the novel when it was published by Gallimard in 1951; the Gallimard edition omits some of the more pornographic passages in the novel. Later L'Arbalete editions include a number of smaller revisions.

The novel is dedicated to the convicted and executed murderer Maurice Pilorge.

== Literary influence ==
The novel was an enormous influence on the Beats, with its free-flowing, highly poetic language mixed with argot/slang, and its celebration of lowlifes and explicit descriptions of homosexuality. It is elegantly transgressive, and its self-reflexive nature prefigures the approach to language developed later by the post-structuralists. Jacques Derrida wrote on Genet in his book Glas, and Hélène Cixous celebrated his work as an example of écriture feminine. Jean-Paul Sartre wrote his famous Saint Genet as an analysis of Genet's work and life but most especially of Our Lady of the Flowers. Our Lady of the Flowers made Genet, in Sartre's mind at least, a poster child of existentialism and most especially an embodiment of that philosophy's views on freedom.

== Adaptations ==
Lindsay Kemp created a production called "Flowers - A pantomime for Jean Genet" (based on Our Lady of the Flowers by Jean Genet) in 1974 at the Bush Theatre, London, inspired by Genet's words: "The saga of Divine should be danced or mimed." This production had evolved from earlier versions beginning in 1969 in Edinburgh. "Flowers" subsequently transferred to New York, Australia, Japan and all over Europe and South America... its last performance being in 1992 in Buenos Aires.

== In popular culture ==
In Nigel Williams' Scenes from a Poisoner's Life (1994), the main protagonist gives Our Lady of the Flowers to his homosexual brother as a Christmas present.

The performer, actor, and drag queen Divine was named after the main character of the book. Filmmaker John Waters gave him this nickname after reading Genet's novel.

The Pogues have a song titled "Hell's Ditch", which contains references to the novel.

Placebo's self-titled 1996 debut album features a song called "Lady of the Flowers."

David Bowie was under the influence of this novel and referred to it in his 1972 song "The Jean Genie".

== See also ==
- Le Monde's 100 Books of the Century
