= James Lyons (film editor) =

American film editor and actor

- Born: James K. Lyons; October 8, 1960; New York, United States
- Died: April 12, 2007 (aged 46); Manhattan, New York City, New York, United States
- Occupations: Film editor, screenwriter, actor
- Known for: Velvet Goldmine; The Virgin Suicides
- Partner: Terrence Savage

James Lyons (October 8, 1960 – April 12, 2007) was an American film editor, screenwriter and actor who frequently collaborated with Todd Haynes. He is probably best known for editing The Virgin Suicides and editing and co-writing Velvet Goldmine. As an actor, Lyons played the role of Jack Bolton in Poison (1991 film), directed by Todd Haynes, the adult David Wojnarowicz in Steve McClean's Postcards from America in 1995, and also in other films such as the 1996 film I Shot Andy Warhol as Billy Name.

== Filmography as editor ==
- Poison (1991)
- The Debt (1993)
- Late Fall (1994)
- Safe (1995)
- Ratchet (1996)
- Strawberry Fields (1997)
- Shooting Porn (1997)
- First Love, Last Rites (1997)
- Velvet Goldmine (1998)
- The Virgin Suicides (1999)
- Spring Forward (1999)
- The Château (2001)
- Prozac Nation (2001)
- Far from Heaven (2002)
- Ghostlight (2003)
- Imaginary Heroes (2004)
- A Walk Into the Sea: Danny Williams and the Warhol Factory (2007)

== Personal life ==
Lyons was involved in a long-term relationship with filmmaker Todd Haynes.

== Death ==
He died in Manhattan of squamous cell carcinoma, at the age of 46, after more than a decade of treatment for HIV.
