= Willem Hendrik Suringar =

Dutch philanthropist

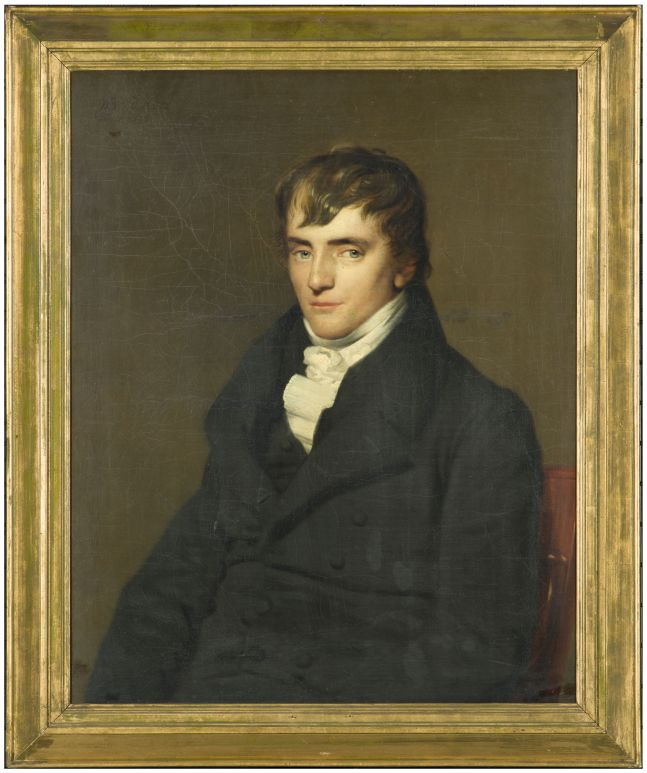
William Suringar

Willem Hendrik Suringar (3 August 1790 – 17 September 1872) was a Dutch philanthropist who established the Netherlands Mettray, the equivalent of the French Mettray Penal Colony.

== Selected publications ==
- My Visit to Mettray in 1845: A Speech
