= Nadav Safran =

American expert in Arab and Middle East politics (1925–2003)

- Born: August 25, 1925; Cairo, Kingdom of Egypt
- Died: July 5, 2003 (aged 77); Daytona Beach, Florida, U.S.
- Education: Brandeis University (BA); Harvard University (PhD)
- Known for: Middle East security analysis; Expertise on Arab-Israeli relations; Director of Harvard CMES
- Scientific career
- Fields: Political science, Middle East studies

Nadav Safran (Arabic: نداف صفران, Hebrew: נדב ספרן; August 25, 1925, Cairo – July 5, 2003, State College, PA) was an expert in Arab and Middle East politics and a director of Harvard's Center for Middle Eastern Studies.

== Life ==
Safran was born in Cairo in 1925 to Joseph and Jeanne (Abadi) Safran, parents of oriental Jewish heritage. He married Anita Balicka on June 9, 1955 and had three daughters — Abigail, Nina, and Elizabeth.

Safran worked on a kibbutz in 1946 and fought as a lieutenant in the 1948 Arab–Israeli War. After the armistice was signed in 1949, he moved to the United States in 1950 and attended Brandeis University, graduating with a B.A. in 1954, and received his Ph.D. from Harvard University in 1958.

He remained at Harvard to teach government for two years and then worked as a research fellow at the university's Center for Middle East Studies. He became director of the Center for Middle East Studies and was also at that time an adviser to the White House on Middle East issues. He was a professor in Harvard's Government department until his retirement in 2002.

Safran was the thesis supervisor of the Palestinian scholar Hanna Mikhail.

== Scandal ==
In the early 1980s, it came to light that he had accepted large sums of funding from the CIA without disclosing the fact to the university. According to Zachary Lockman:

The scandal erupted when it became known that Safran had taken $45,700 from the Central Intelligence Agency to fund a major international conference he was hosting at Harvard on "Islam and Politics in the Contemporary Muslim World"—a hot topic at the time and one of obvious interest to the CIA. Not only had Safran secretly used CIA funding for this conference, he had not told the invitees, a number of whom were coming from the Middle East, that the CIA was picking up the tab. It then came out that Safran had also received a $107,430 grant from the CIA for the research project that led to his 1985 book Saudi Arabia: The Ceaseless Quest for Security. Safran's contract with the CIA stipulated that the agency had the right to review and approve the manuscript before publication and that its role in funding the book would not be disclosed. And indeed, the book as published made no mention of the fact that the research for it had been partially funded by the CIA.
When the scandal broke, about half the invitees to Safran's conference withdrew, and many of the faculty and students associated with Harvard's Center for Middle Eastern Studies publicly expressed their opposition to Safran's actions. A month later the Middle East Studies Association censured Safran on the grounds that his actions had violated its 1982 resolution calling on scholars to disclose their sources of research funding. Safran intimated that his critics were motivated by anti-Semitism, but after an internal investigation at Harvard he agreed to step down as center director at the end of the academic year.

== Later life and death ==
After the ensuing scandal was extensively covered in The Harvard Crimson and The Boston Globe, Safran resigned his position as the head of the Middle East Center. He retired as a professor from Harvard in 2002, and died of cancer in 2003 at the age of 77.

== Honors ==
Safran had been honored with fellowships from Harvard, Yale and Princeton Universities, from the Sheldon, Guggenheim, Rockefeller and Ford Foundations, and from the Center for Advanced Study in the Behavioral Sciences.

== Publications ==
- (January 1961) Egypt in Search of Political Community : An Analysis of the Intellectual and Political Evolution of Egypt, 1804-1952 (Harvard Middle Eastern Studies) ISBN 0-674-24150-9
- (January 1963) United States and Israel ISBN 0-674-92490-8
- (January 1969) From War to War: The Arab-Israeli Confrontation, 1948-1967: A Study of the Conflict from the Perspective of Coercion in the Context of Inter-Arab and Big Power Relations ISBN 0-672-63540-2
- (August 1981) Israel: The Embattled Ally ISBN 0-674-46882-1
- (September 1985) Saudi Arabia: The Ceaseless Quest for Security ISBN 0-674-78985-7
- Israeli politics since the 1967 war ASIN B0007AE89W
- Israel today; a profile (1965) ASIN B0006BN3FM
