= The Devil and the Good Lord =

1951 play by Jean-Paul Sartre

- The French edition
- Original language: French
- Written by: Jean-Paul Sartre

Premiere
- Date: 7 June 1951
- Place: Théâtre-Antoine, Paris

The Devil and the Good Lord (French: Le Diable et le Bon Dieu) is a 1951 play by French philosopher Jean-Paul Sartre. The play concerns the moral choices of its characters, warlord Goetz, clergy Heinrich, communist leader Nasti and others during the German Peasants' War. The first act follows Goetz' transformation from vicious war criminal to a "good" person of noble deeds, as during a siege of the town of Worms, he decides not to massacre its citizens.

The play was first performed at the Théâtre-Antoine in Paris, where it opened on 7 June 1951 and ran until March 1952. This production was directed by Louis Jouvet. Of all his dramatic writings, The Devil and the Good Lord was Sartre's favourite. He based the character of Goetz on his analysis of the psychology and morality of the writer Jean Genet, which he had developed more substantially in his Saint Genet (1952).

== Sources ==
- White, Edmund. 1993. Genet. Corrected edition. London: Picador, 1994. ISBN 0-330-30622-7.
