= Miracle of the Rose =

1946 book by Jean Genet

- First US edition
- Author: Jean Genet
- Original title: Miracle de la rose
- Translator: Bernard Frechtman
- Language: French
- Genre: Semi-autobiographical novel
- Publisher: Marc Barbezat - L'Arbalete (Original French); Grove Press (US); A. Blond (UK)
- Publication date: 1946
- Publication place: France
- English publication date: 1966
- Media type: Print
- ISBN: 978-1-1270-5464-0 (English hardcover)
- Preceded by: Our Lady of the Flowers
- Followed by: Funeral Rites

Miracle of the Rose (French: Miracle de la rose) is a 1946 book by Jean Genet about experiences as a detainee in Mettray Penal Colony and Fontevrault prison, although there is no direct evidence of Genet ever having been imprisoned in the latter establishment. This autobiographical work has a non-linear structure: stories from Genet's adolescence are mixed in with his experiences as a thirty-year-old man at Fontevrault prison. At Mettray, Genet describes homosexual erotic desires for his fellow adolescent detainees. There is also a fantastical dimension to the narrative, particularly in Fontevrault passages concerning a prisoner called Harcamone who is condemned to death for murder. Genet idolises Harcamone and writes poetically about the rare occasions on which he catches a glimpse of this character. Genet was detained in Mettray Penal Colony between 2 September 1926 and 1 March 1929, after which, at the age of 18, he joined the Foreign Legion.

== In popular culture ==
The Pogues released a song titled "Hell's Ditch", which contains references to the novel. The composer Hans Werner Henze composed a piece with a title of the same name 'Le Miracle de la Rose'.

Poison (1991), written and directed by Todd Haynes, adapts scenes from Genet's novel.

William S. Burroughs used the title "The Miracle of the Rose" as a chapter in his novel "The Wild Boys: A Book of the Dead".

Pete Doherty recites an excerpt from Genet's novel in his 2009 debut solo single The Last of the English Roses.
