= Mettray Penal Colony =

Youth penal colony in Mettray, France from 1840 to 1937

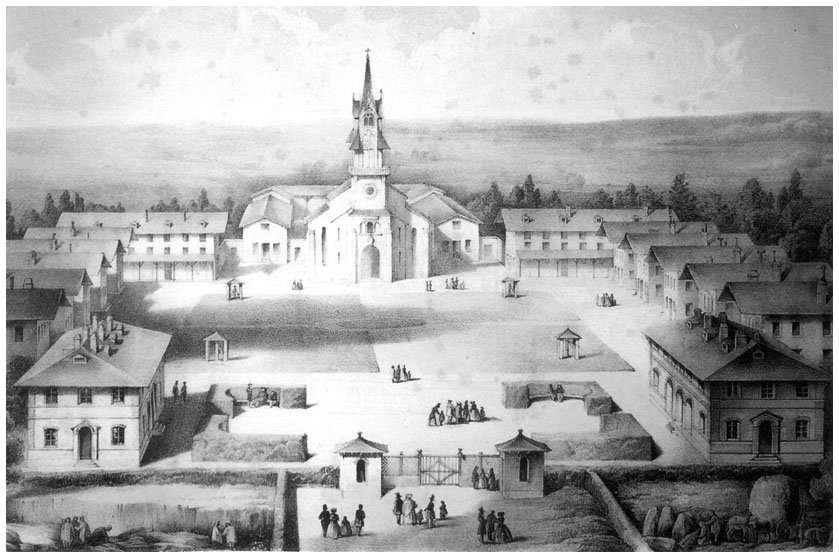
Mettray in 1844.

Mettray Penal Colony, situated in the small village of Mettray, in the French département of Indre-et-Loire, just north of the city of Tours, was a private reformatory, without walls, opened in 1840 for the rehabilitation of young male delinquents aged between 6 and 21. At that time, children and adolescents were normally imprisoned together with adults. Aspects of the progressive way in which the Colony was organized anticipated the English borstal system established at the beginning of the 20th century.

== History ==
Frédéric-Auguste Demetz (1796–1873), a penal reformer and lawyer at the French Royal Court, together with the architect Guillaume-Abel Blouet (1795–1853), toured the United States together in 1836 to study American prison architecture and administration for the French government. Today Blouet is probably best known as the architect who completed the Arc de Triomphe in Paris. Upon Blouet's return to Paris he devoted himself to the reform of prison design and in 1838 was appointed Inspector General of French Prisons. Blouet believed in using architecture to realize social reform and together with Demetz worked on the design and layout of the buildings for the Colony which was initially directed by Demetz after its opening in July 1839. It was noted as being officially opened on 22 January 1840.

== Layout ==
The layout of the Colony was characterised by a sense of order and community. From the entrance to the Colony a large central square, dominated symbolically by a chapel on one side, lies at the end of a long tree-lined avenue. The entrance to the square has the director's house on one side and the preparatory school, where the instructors were trained, on the other. Ten identical, three-storey pavilions are arranged on the two sides of the square. These were referred to as houses and were the places where the boys lived and worked. There were workshops on the ground floor where the boys who did not work in the fields learnt a trade. The first floor functioned as a dormitory at night, with the boys sleeping in hammocks, and as a refectory during the day time. The second floor contained a separate dormitory for the younger children.

Each house was occupied by a family of 40 boys under the supervision of a young man (chef de famille) and his assistant (sous chef) specially chosen by Demetz and trained at the Colony's own preparatory school. The Colony was deliberately organised to imitate the structure of a family because it was felt that the failure of the boys' biological families was the reason for them to be sent to Mettray. Besides the pavilions there were flower gardens, accommodation for visitors, stables, a farm with animals and extensive cultivated fields, and a quarry. A replica of a sailing ship, complete with masts and rigging, was set in the square and used for training boys, many of whom would enter the navy on leaving Mettray. There were around 400 inmates in total and the Colony was largely self-sufficient.

== Formative years ==
Demetz believed in the healing properties of nature and his motto was ameliorer l'homme par la terre et la terre par l'homme, sous le regard de Dieu which translated means improve man by the land and the land by man, under the watch of God. The Colony's mission was to reform, through manual agricultural work and through prayer, the young inmates; many of whom had already been corrupted by their stay in traditional prisons. At first the Colony thrived and Demetz's work attracted favorable notice in England, and following the passage of the first Youthful Offenders Act (1854), which greatly stimulated the building of reform and industrial schools, he became the hero of the British philanthropic world. A number of similar penal colonies, modelled on Mettray, were established in other countries including Poland, the Nederlandsche Mettray (by William Suringar) in the Netherlands and the Philanthropic Society's Farm School for Boys at Redhill, Surrey, in England.

The boys had their heads shaved, wore uniforms, and up to the age of 12 spent most of the day studying arithmetic, writing and reading. The older boys had just one hour of classes and the rest of the day was spent working. Some were employed in trades, or in the orchards and vineyards, but the majority performed hard agricultural labour including digging and crushing stones for roads. The work was hard, the food mediocre and any misdeeds were severely punished. This discipline could not, however, prevent the vices encouraged by the overcrowded conditions in which the boys lived.

Apart from the reformatory for boys who were mostly deprived, disadvantaged or abandoned children, many of whom had committed only petty crimes, there was a separate institution, the Maison Paternelle, where wealthy families paid to have their wayward children looked after. The writer Jules Verne sent his son Michel to Mettray for a period of 6 months in 1876.

== Decline ==
In his book The Miracle of the Rose (1946), the French writer Jean Genet described his experience of nearly three years of detention in the Colony (between 2 September 1926 and 1 March 1929) which ended when he joined the Foreign Legion at age 18. In the 1920s Mettray was no longer the radical liberal institution run by Demetz, who had died in 1873, and was now widely criticized for its harsh discipline.

This criticism, combined with financial problems, led to the Colony's closure in 1937, by which time more than 17,000 boys had passed its doors, and it had become the most well-known institution of its kind.

The site is still accessible to visitors at 47°26′57″N 0°39′31″E

== Mettray in Discipline and Punish ==
Mettray Penal colony has become more than just a model prison for boys in the work of Michel Foucault. In Discipline and Punish Foucault denotes the opening of Mettray prison as the most significant change in the modern status of prisons. He writes: "Were I to fix the date of completion of the carceral system... [t]he date I would choose would be 22 January 1840, the date of the official opening of Mettray. Or better still, perhaps, that glorious day, unremarked and unrecorded, when a child in Mettray remarked as he lay dying: 'What a pity I left the colony so soon'." Mettray became the focal point for Foucault because of the various systems and expressions of power which it exhibited, something which became very important for the investigations of Michel Foucault in his works. The precursors to his works can be seen in the structures inherent in Mettray. Despite its relatively unremarkable place in penal lore, this notation by Foucault sets Mettray apart from many other prisons. For if Foucault is to be believed, it was at this French penal colony where began our descent into modern penal theories and the inherent power structures they entail.

== See also ==
- Timeline of children's rights in the United Kingdom
