= Hanan Ashrawi =

Palestinian legislator, activist, and scholar (born 1946)

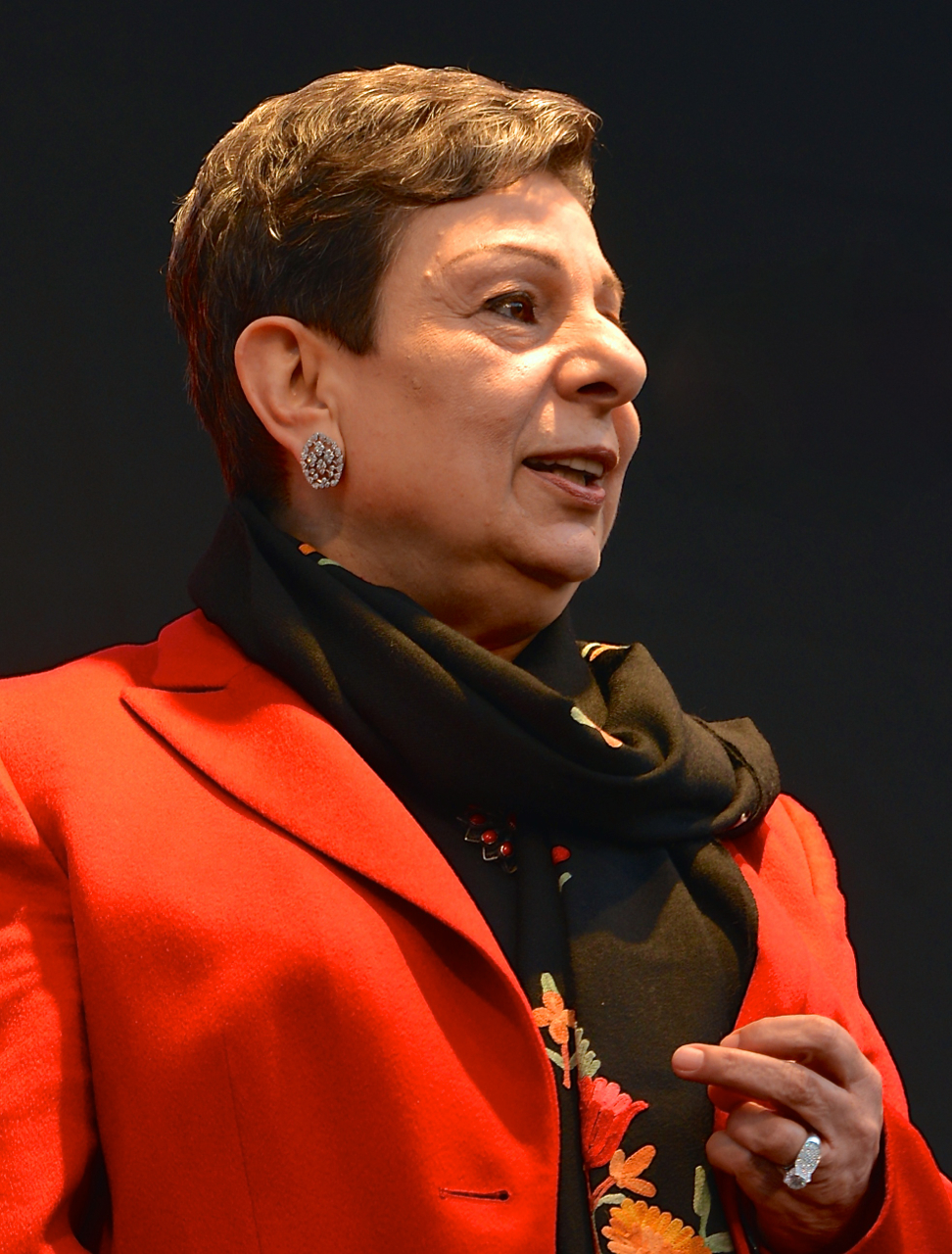
- Ashrawi in 2013

Member of the Palestinian Legislative Council for Jerusalem Governorate
- Incumbent
- Assumed office 7 March 1996

Minister of Higher Education and Scientific Research
- In office 17 May 1996 – 9 August 1998
- President: Yasser Arafat
- Preceded by: Office established
- Succeeded by: Munther Salah

Personal details
- Born: Hanan Daoud Mikhael Ashrawi; 8 October 1946 (age 80) Nablus, Mandatory Palestine
- Party: Third Way (2005–present)
- Other political affiliations: Independent (before 2005)
- Spouse: Emile Ashrawi (m. 1976)
- Children: 2
- Parent(s): Daoud Mikhail (father); Wadi'a Ass'ad (mother)
- Relatives: Hanna Mikhail (cousin)
- Education: American University of Beirut (BA, MA); University of Virginia (Ph.D.)
- Occupation: Politician, activist, scholar

Hanan Daoud Mikhael Ashrawi (Arabic: حنان داوود مخايل عشراوي; born 8 October 1946) is a Palestinian politician, activist, and scholar.

Ashrawi began her career at Birzeit University. Beginning in the 1990s, Ashrawi was a member of the PLO's Leadership Committee, serving as the official spokesperson of the Palestinian delegation during the Madrid Peace Conference of 1991. In 1996, Ashrawi was appointed as the Minister of Higher Education and Scientific Research of the Palestinian Authority in the second Arafat cabinet. Ashrawi was elected to the Palestinian Legislative Council representing Jerusalem in 1996 and was re-elected in 2006. She was elected as member of the Executive Committee of the Palestine Liberation Organization (PLO) in 2009 and 2018, becoming the body's first female member. She resigned in 2020.

As a civil society activist, she founded the Independent Commission for Human Rights in 1994 and served as its Commissioner-General until 1995. In 1998, she also founded MIFTAH, the Palestinian Initiative for the Promotion of Global Dialogue and Democracy, and she continues to serve as head of its board of directors. In 1999, Ashrawi founded the National Coalition for Accountability and Integrity (AMAN).

She is the author of several books, articles, poems and short stories on Palestinian politics, culture and literature. Her book This Side of Peace (Simon & Schuster, 1995) earned worldwide recognition.

== Early life ==
Ashrawi was born to Palestinian Christian parents on 8 October 1946 in the city of Nablus, British Mandate of Palestine, now part of the occupied West Bank. Her father, Daoud Mikhail, was a physician and one of the founders of the Palestine Liberation Organization, and her mother Wadi'a Ass'ad Mikhail, was an ophthalmic nurse. Hanna Mikhail, a scholar and Fatah revolutionary, was her cousin.

== 1948 war and education ==
The Ashrawi family lived in Nablus. From there, they moved to Tiberias, where they remained until Israel became a state in 1948. In 1948, the Mikhail family fled from Tiberias to Amman, Jordan as a result of the 1948 Arab–Israeli War. Initially, her father, Daoud Mikhail, remained behind in what became Israel, but he later rejoined the family in Jordan.

In 1950, her family were able to settle in Ramallah, at the time part of the Jordanian annexed West Bank. Here, she attended the Ramallah Friends Girls School, a Quaker school. She was inspired to activism by her father, who favored a greater role for women in society and was repeatedly imprisoned by the Jordanian authorities for his activities with the Arab Nationalist Socialist Party and the PLO. She received her bachelor's and master's degrees in literature in the Department of English at the American University of Beirut (AUB).

While a graduate student in literature at the American University in Beirut, she dated Peter Jennings of ABC News, who was stationed there as ABC's Beirut bureau chief. When the Six-Day War broke out in 1967, Ashrawi, then a 22-year-old student in Lebanon, was declared an absentee by Israel and denied re-entry to the West Bank. For the next six years, Ashrawi traveled and completed her education, gaining a Ph.D. in Medieval and Comparative Literature from the University of Virginia. Ashrawi was finally allowed to re-join her family in 1973 under the family reunification plan.

== Politics and activism ==
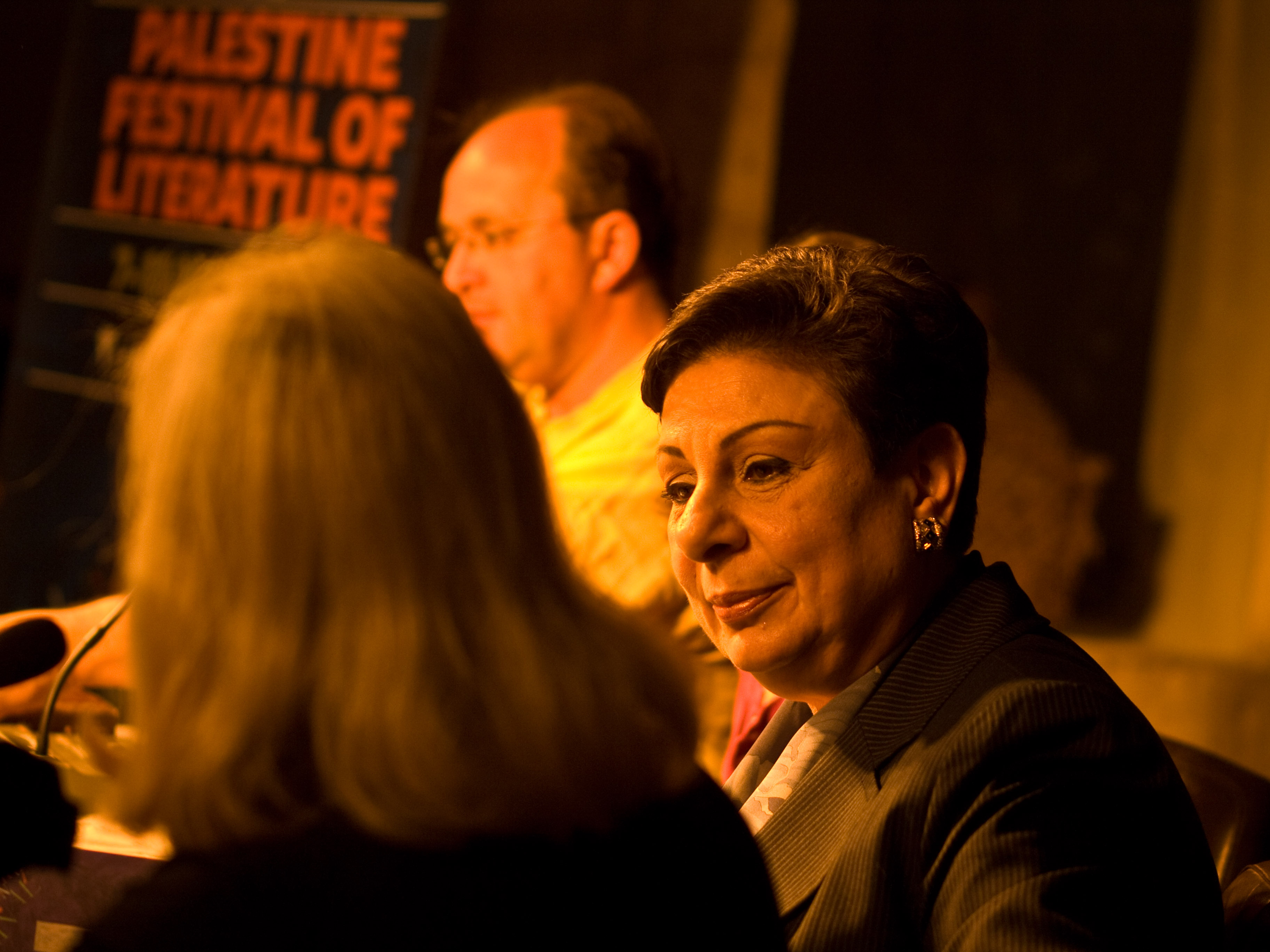
Ashrawi in 2008

While voluntarily a student but denied re-entry to the West Bank, she became the spokesperson for the General Union of Palestinian Students in Lebanon, helped organize women's revolutionary groups and served as a guide to foreign reporters visiting Palestinian refugee camps.

Ashrawi returned to the West Bank under the family reunification plan in 1973 and established the Department of English at Birzeit University. She served as chair of that department from 1973 to 1978, and again from 1981 through 1984; and from 1986 to 1990 she served the university as Dean of the Faculty of Arts. She remained a faculty member at Birzeit University until 1995, publishing numerous poems, short stories, papers and articles on Palestinian culture, literature, and politics.

Ashrawi's political activism in the Palestinian territories began almost as early as her academic career at Birzeit. In 1974, she founded the Birzeit University Legal Aid Committee and Human Rights Action Project. Her political work took a greater leap in 1988 during the First Intifada, when she joined the Intifada Political Committee, serving on its Diplomatic Committee until 1993. From 1991 to 1993 she served as the official spokesperson of the Palestinian Delegation to the Middle East peace process and a member of the Leadership/Guidance Committee and executive committee of the delegation.

From 1993 to 1995, with the signing of the Oslo Accords by Yasser Arafat and Yitzhak Rabin, Palestinian self-rule was established, and Ashrawi headed the Preparatory Committee of the Palestinian Independent Commission for Citizens' Rights in Jerusalem. Ashrawi has also served since 1996 as an elected member of the Palestinian Legislative Council for the Jerusalem Governorate.

In 1996, Ashrawi was appointed the Palestinian Authority Minister of Higher Education and Research in the second Arafat cabinet, but she resigned the post in 1998 in protest against political corruption, specifically Arafat's handling of peace talks and later that year founded MIFTAH—the Palestinian Initiative for the Promotion of Global Dialogue and Democracy, an initiative which works towards respect for Palestinian human rights, democracy and peace.

Speaking to the United Nations in 2018, Ashrawi said that the actions of the Trump Administration, including the United States recognition of Jerusalem as capital of Israel, its movement of its embassy and its promised "Deal of the century" had made the two state solution "very much in doubt," adding "Unless there is the will to engage, to intervene effectively – not just to end settlement activities but to begin to dismantle settlements – Israel will have succeeded in super-imposing Greater Israel on all of historical Palestine".

In August 2020, Ashrawi lambasted the peace agreement between Israel and the United Arab Emirates, writing on Twitter that "Israel got rewarded for not declaring openly what it's been doing to Palestine illegally and persistently since the beginning of the occupation."

On 26 September 2009, in an interview on Riz Khan's One on One on Al Jazeera English, Ashrawi defined her current role in the following way: "I think of myself essentially as a human being with a multidimensional mission. Basically, I am a Palestinian, I am a woman, I am an activist and a humanist, more than being a politician. And at the same time I feel that quite often things are thrust upon us rather than come as a result of a calm and deliberate choice."

== Awards and appointments ==
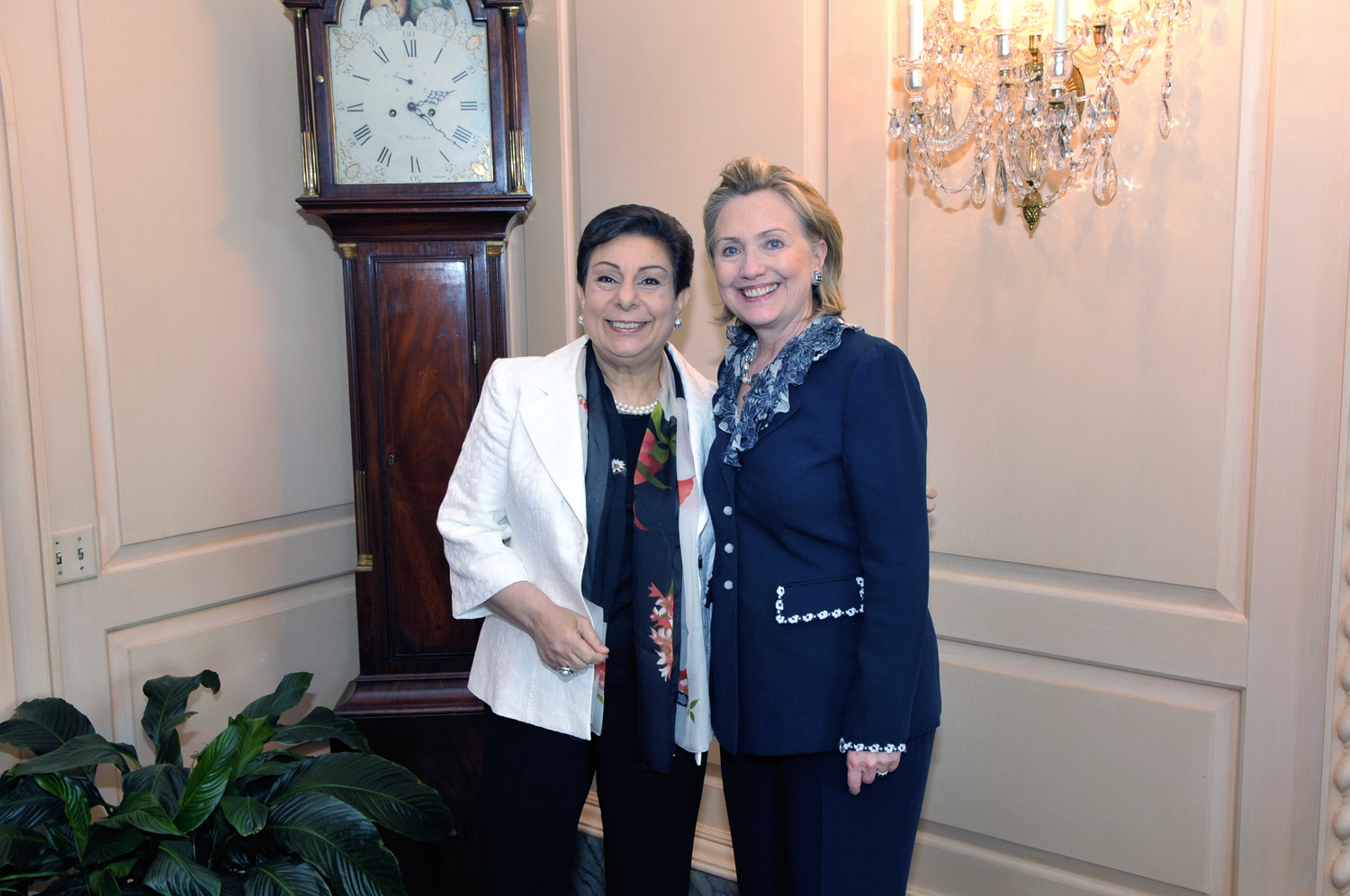
Ashrawi with U.S. Secretary of State Hillary Clinton in 2010

Ashrawi is the recipient of numerous awards from all over the world, including the French Legion of Honour in 2006; the 2005 Mahatma Gandhi International Award for Peace and Reconciliation; the 2003 Sydney Peace Prize; the 2002 Olof Palme Prize; the 1999 International Women of Hope "Bread and Roses"; the Defender of Democracy Award – Parliamentarians for Global Action; the 50 Women of the Century; the 1996 Jane Addams International Women's Leadership Award; the Pearl S. Buck Foundation Women's Award; the 1994 Pio Manzù Gold Medal Peace Award; and the 1992 Marissa Bellisario International Peace Award.

Ashrawi is the recipient of eleven honorary doctorates from universities in the U.S., Canada, Europe, and the Arab world. These include: The American University of Beirut (AUB) – Lebanon (June 2008); The American University in Cairo (AUC), Doctor of Humane Letters – Cairo, Egypt (June 2003); Saint Mary's University, Doctor of Civil Law – Halifax, Canada (October 2000); Smith College, Doctor of Humane Letters – Northampton, Massachusetts (1999); Earlham College, Doctor of Humane Letters – Richmond, Indiana (1999); Vrije Universiteit Brussel – Belgium (1997); Bath University, Doctor of Laws – Bath, England (1993); and The Virginia Theological Seminary – Alexandria, Virginia (1993).

She is a member of various international advisory boards and councils. Her past and present memberships include the following: U.S./Middle East Project (USMEP); TAKREEM Arab Achievement Awards; Center for Transregional Studies "Advisory Council" – Princeton University; Council on Foreign Relations – Washington D.C.; Deir Yassin Remembered – New York; Fund for the Future of Our Children – Washington D.C.; Initiative for Peace and Cooperation in the Middle East – Special project of The Search for Common Ground; International Commission on Intervention and State Sovereignty; International Institute for Democracy and Electoral Assistance (IDEA)- Stockholm, Sweden; Member of the UN Secretary General's Group for Dialogue Among Civilizations; Mercy Corps International – WashingtonPeace Works – U.S.; Task Force on Higher Education (A World Bank, Harvard University and UNESCO initiative); The Carter Center (Human Rights Center); The Dialogue Center – The Netherlands; The World Bank Middle East and North Africa Region (MENA); United Nations Research Institute for Social Development (UNRISD); Palestine Institute for Public Diplomacy (PIPD); The Holy Land Christian Ecumenical Foundation – Know Thy Heritage Advisory Board; CAABU – Honorary Patron; Beyond Conflict (formerly The Project on Justice in Times of Transition) – New York, U.S.; and the UN Women Executive Directors Civil Society Advisory Group.

=== Sydney Peace prize ===
In 2003, Ashrawi was awarded the Sydney Peace Prize. Her selection drew praise from Mary Robinson (former United Nations High Commissioner for Human Rights, and former President of Ireland), and Archbishop Desmond Tutu. Madeleine Albright, former US Secretary of State also supported the selection and said: "She [Ashrawi] is a brilliant spokeswoman for her cause."

Her selection was controversial among some Jewish political organisations. Michael Kapel, a member of the board of the Australia/Israel & Jewish Affairs Council called her "an apologist for Islamic terror." Activist Antony Loewenstein argued in his book My Israel Question that the Australian media, and various Jewish organizations, defamed and vilified Ashrawi in order to prevent her winning the Peace Prize. Of the controversy, Israeli politician Yael Dayan said: "And this Hanan Ashrawi... I think she's very courageous, and she contributes quite a lot to the peace process." Baruch Kimmerling, a sociologist from the Hebrew University, wrote: "As an Israeli, as a Jew and as an academic I am deeply sorry and ashamed that members of the Australian Jewish community are acting against this rightful nomination."

== Personal life ==
On 8 August 1975, Ashrawi married Emile Ashrawi, a Christian Jerusalemite who is now a photographer and a theater director. They have two daughters, Amal and Zeina.

== Works published ==
External videos
- Booknotes interview with Ashrawi on This Side of Peace, June 4, 1995, C-SPAN

- Anthology of Palestinian Literature (ed).
- The Modern Palestinian Short Story: An Introduction to Practical Criticism
- Contemporary Palestinian Literature under Occupation
- Contemporary Palestinian Poetry and Fiction
- Literary Translation: Theory and Practice
- This Side of Peace: A Personal Account (ISBN 0-684-80294-5)

== Notes ==
Political offices
New office	Minister of Higher Education and Scientific Research; 1996–1998	Succeeded by Munther Salah
