= The Thief's Journal =

1949 novel by Jean Genet

- Author: Jean Genet
- Original title: Journal du voleur
- Translator: Bernard Frechtman
- Language: French
- Genre: Novel
- Publisher: Gallimard (original French), Grove Press (English translation)
- Publication date: 1949
- Publication place: France
- English publication date: 1964
- Media type: Print

The Thief's Journal (Journal du voleur, published in 1949) is a novel by Jean Genet. Although autobiographical to some degree, Genet's exploitation of poetic language results in an ambiguity throughout the text. Superficially, the novel follows the author's progress though 1930s Europe, wearing little and enduring hunger, contempt, and fatigue: "the life of the vermin". The protagonist is "hot for crime" and romanticizes criminality as well as homosexuality, two facets of his identity that keep him ostracized from the general public.

== About the author's life ==
Jean Genet was born on December 19, 1910, and died aged 75 on April 15, 1986. He was abandoned by his mother, who worked as a sex worker, to a foundling home, and then was later taken in by a foster family. When his foster mother died, however, his status within the house changed and he was seen as a domestic servant. He stole and ran away from reformatory school repeatedly between the ages of fifteen and eighteen, was imprisoned, and ultimately got sent back to the reformatory institution from which he had fled.

Genet enlisted in the French army in March 1929 and was dispatched to Syria. He left the army in 1936 and started living as a burglar and vagabond. While imprisoned in 1940, he started working on the novel Our Lady of the Flowers. Upon his detention in 1943 at a camp that served as a notorious deportation hub for Nazi concentration camps, almost forty prominent writers and artists persuaded him of his amazing penmanship and made a stand for him. After being set free in March 1944, he never went back to jail. The president of France pardoned Genet in 1949 for his crime of leaving the military. The French Ministry of Culture awarded him the National Grand Prize for Literature in 1983.

After falling and striking his head, Genet died at a tiny Parisian hotel on April 15, 1986. Ten days later, he was buried in Morocco.

He was one of the most prolific French writers of the century, despite starting to write at the age of thirty-two. He wrote poetry, the autobiographical book The Thief's Journey, the novels: Our Lady of the Flowers and Miracle of the Rose, Querelle of Brest, and Funeral Rites. Deathwatch, The Maids, The Balcony, The Blacks, The Screens, and Splendid's (the manuscript for which was only recovered in 1993) are the six plays he composed.

== The outsider ==
First, the concept of the outsider is embodied in Genet as narrator and protagonist. Indeed, Genet establishes a "constructed reader," a fictional personification of the bourgeois values of the late 1940s, against which to measure his deviance from the "norms" of society. refers to the reader in the accusatory second person. This is manifest in his denoting of the reader as “you.”

== Homosexual love affairs ==
The novel is structured around a series of homosexual love affairs between the author/anti-hero and various criminals, con artists, pimps, and a detective. Genet is in love with “theft and thieves” and describes the ins and outs of his homosexual lifestyle with little filter.

The first of Genet’s relationships evident in the novel develops after Salvador, a fellow vagrant, offers to beg for Genet, a testament to his status as “the more loving of the two”. Salvador’s act of service is dramatically romanticized, his “torn and tattered jacket” cape-like. The description also functions as an example of Genet’s poeticism of his situation as opposed to its actuality. Indeed, Salvador is the very archetype of “poverty”, and it could be argued that their relationship is nothing but a mutually beneficial agreement as a result of their social circumstances: “Salvador took care of me, but at night, by candlelight, I hunted for lice, our pets, in the seam of his trousers”. Thus, their amorous entanglement is not necessarily evidence of either’s sexuality. This is reinforced in Salvador’s reaction to Genet’s attempt to publicly show him affection: “Are you crazy? People’ll take us for mariconas!”. It is clear, therefore, that although the two function to some extent as a male couple, queerness does not resonate with Salvador, whether that be out of shame, or because he himself is not homosexual.

In fact, shame is a recurring theme in Genet’s homosexual relationships: the author stating that “It is when I have made him come that I feel him hating me” in reference to his affair with Java, and that “After coming (perhaps, without daring to tell me so)” one of his hookups disappears to wash himself. This reiterates Genet’s status as the other, not in the sense that he is alone in his desire for male-loving-male relationships, but in that he is unusual in his willingness to openly discuss the topic.

Genet’s pride is optimised in his use of bodily language to describe homosexual acts. Indeed, there is a sense that the greater the reference to “sperm, sweat and blood,” the more notable the grandeur of the act is. Perhaps the most telling example of this is Genet’s argument that it is “the spittle [Stilitano] passed from one cheek to the other and which he would sometimes draw out in front of his mouth like a veil” which makes him so attractive. Genet goes on to compare his own spit, “spun glassware, transparent and fragile”, with that of Stilitano, which he imagines smeared on his penis.

Like with Salvador, however, Genet questions the extent to which Stilitano owes “all that beauty to my fallen state,”. reiterating the relationship queer identity has with one’s social situation throughout the entire novel.

== Criminality and homosexuality ==
Homosexuality is part and parcel of criminality in Genet's The Thief's Journal. This can be attributed to some extent to the legal status of homosexuality at the time but is primarily a result of the way "the queers" facilitate theft. For example, despite his open hatred of homosexuality, René, makes "the queer who was broke [...] get down on his knees before him", insinuating that, upon realizing his prospective victim has nothing to give him in the form of physical possessions, René has taken payment in the form of a blowjob. Furthermore, "the thieves", and thus Genet's friends, prey specifically on queer people: "René asked me whether I knew any queers he could rob. 'Not your pals, naturally. Your friends are out.'". Indeed, social marginalization, shame and private queer spaces manifest in a vulnerability which makes queer people an easy target. It is interesting, therefore, that a distinction is made between queer people generally, and queer people that are friends with Genet. Indeed, it is only Genet's social situation that has made him the perpetrator of "queers", rather than a queer victim of someone like René. Indeed, Genet himself acknowledges that “My excitement seems to be due to my assuming within me the role of both victim and criminal. Indeed, as a matter of fact, I emit, I project at night the victim and criminal born of me; I bring them together somewhere, and toward morning I am thrilled to learn that the victim came very close to getting the death penalty and the criminal to being sent to the colony or guillotined”, suggesting that regardless of who emerges victorious, the perspective of the criminal and the homosexual are equally resonant with Genet. Equally, when Señorita Dora is overheard as saying, “What bitches they are, those awful she-men!”, Genet experiences a “brief but profound, meditation on their despair”, which is also his despair.

Genet is proud of his dual identity as a thief and a homosexual. Indeed, despite being ridiculed by the police after a tube of Vaseline is found in his pocket (“Watch out you don’t catch cold. You’d give your guy whooping cough”), Genet describes the tube as “a banner telling the invisible legions of my triumph over the police”.

== Poeticism as opposed to realism ==
Finally, Genet appropriates Christian language and concepts to pursue an alternative form of sainthood with its own trinity of virtues – homosexuality, theft, and betrayal. Each burglary is set up as quasi-religious ritual, and the narrator describes the preparation for criminality as like that of a monk in a vigil of prayer, readying himself for a holy life. Indeed, Genet says that “Never did I try to make of it something other than what it was, I did not try to adorn it, to mask it, but on the contrary, I wanted to affirm it in its exact sordidness, and the most sordid signs became for me signs of grandeur”, inverting traditional, societal ideals. This is reiterated in the description that "there is a close relationship between flowers and convicts. The fragility and delicacy of the former are of the same nature as the brutal insensitivity of the latter". Moreover, it is Stilitano’s "broke" status that is attractive to Genet, as opposed to Salvador's "cheerless poverty".

Genet’s decision to invert traditional ideals is further complicated by his use of poetic language, Sartre highlighting the contradiction between Genet’s superficial openness, and the resulting “enveloping myth" that this is manifest in.

Regardless, Sartre's 1952 essay Saint Genet proposes that, once interpreted, Genet's The Thief's Journal provides perhaps the most truthful portrayal of homosexuality ever written.

== Poverty in Spain ==
As stated above, The Thief's Journal is a semi-autobiographical novel, so when the narrator commits to a life of crime, the same way Genet did, we know we are reading a first-hand account of a working-class, queer person in the 1930s. However, poverty isn't seen as one of the central themes of the novel as it's mostly represented explicitly at the beginning; this is because Genet was adopted into a community of artists within Europe, so he became protected. The community would not let him go back to jail, so he physically could not be arrested even though he was still committing crimes. In order to understand Genet's artistic life between the 50s and 60s, we must look at the poverty-stricken life he led and his impoverish travels around Europe in the 1930s that ended him in jail where he found his people.

Firstly, a law was implemented around the 30s in some parts of Europe called the 'Three-strike Policy', which essentially meant that if you committed three crimes, no matter how small or tedious, you were put into prison. This mean that a lot of starving, working-class people were put into prison for stealing food to simply stay alive. Everyone, then, turned to begging.

On page 11 of The Thief's Journal, we see this struggle with homelessness in Spain. This particular entry gives us an insight into the true economic crisis of Europe in the 30s, as the narrator explains that "Spain at the time was covered with vermin, its beggars". Here, we see the reality of being in poverty and living in Spain, as the narrators lover, Salvador, "went out into the freezing street, wearing a torn and tattered jacket- the pockets were ripped and hung down- and a shirt stiff with dirt" to beg for him. This was typical for a lot of people in the 1930s; the world's economic systems were still trying to recover after World War 1 and poverty was inevitable. Genet is trying to get readers to understand his struggle not only as a queer person, but also his struggle to survive in an impoverish world.

Beggars, like himself, are presented as disgusting and dirty within the novel by Genet, and, for the narrator, the lice that infested his, and everyone else's bodies, were seen as jewels. "Having become as useful as the knowledge of our decline as jewels for the knowledge of what is called triumph, the lice were precious". This is an extremely hard-hitting metaphor, as lice are blood-sucking creatures who feed on humans. Despite this, the beggars still appreciate their company and view the lice as highly as Crown Jewels. At this time, society condemned beggars and saw them as the lowest form of human, so it feels as though the beggars are glad that the lice want to suck their blood; at least someone wants to touch and crawl all over them. This grotesque imagery helps readers to imagine the truly horrific living conditions of those in poverty, and helps shape the rest of the novel.

Thus, Genet's poverty is an important part of the novel as, if he did not live an impoverish life and have extreme struggles, he would not have found his community and writing The Thief's Journal, would not have been possible. Using gruesome descriptions of an unhygienic body and lice, Genet manages to significantly highlight how truly dehumanising living in poverty can be. Therefore, Genet was not only dehumanised for his queerness, he was dehumanised for his poverty and the life he led, in which we see in The Thief's Journal.
