= Prisoner of Love (book) =

1986 book by Jean Genet (posthumous)

- Author: Jean Genet
- Translator: Barbara Bray
- Publication date: May 1986

Prisoner of Love is Jean Genet's final book, which was posthumously published from manuscripts he was working on at the time of his death. Under its French title, Un captif amoureux, the book was first published in Paris by Gallimard in May 1986. Translated into English by Barbara Bray and with an introduction by Edmund White it was published by Picador. Prisoner of Love was subsequently published in 2003 by New York Review Books. with a new lengthy introduction by Ahdaf Soueif.

The book is a memoir of Genet's encounters with Palestinian fighters and Black Panthers. Starting in 1970, he had spent two years in the Palestinian refugee camps in Jordan. Visiting Beirut in September 1982, he found himself in the midst of the Israeli invasion of the city. He was one of the first foreigners to enter Shatila refugee camp after the massacre of hundreds of its inhabitants.

== Reception ==
According to Edmund White, "For a book about one of the most ideologically heated conflicts of modern times, Prisoner of Love is curiously cool and unpolemical." As described by Publishers Weekly, "Part anti-Zionist tract, part memoir and philosophical discourse, this uninhibited cascade of images and associations is less a political document than a map of Genet's mental landscape." Edward Said in The Observer called it "one of the strangest and most extraordinary books of the decade", and the Washington Post Book World review said: "Written with pain’s steel nib, it is a product of long incubation, tender and philosophical and almost Proustian." For the Los Angeles Reader, it is "An undeniable masterpiece, written with assurance and the fine white heat of lifelong rage."

== Stage adaptation ==
Prisoner of Love was staged as a performance piece by JoAnne Akalaitis at the New York Theatre Workshop from 12 May to 25 June 1995, with an original score composed by Philip Glass.
