= Saint Genet =

1952 book by Jean-Paul Sartre

Saint Genet, Actor and Martyr
- Author: Jean-Paul Sartre
- Original title: Saint Genet, comédien et martyr
- Translator: Bernard Frechtman
- Language: French
- Series: Collection Blanche
- Subject: Jean Genet
- Publisher: Librairie Gallimard
- Publication date: 1952
- Publication place: France
- English publication date: 1963
- Media type: Print
- Pages: 625 (English edition)
- LC Class: 63-15828

Saint Genet, Actor and Martyr (French: Saint Genet, comédien et martyr) is a book by the French philosopher Jean-Paul Sartre about the writer Jean Genet, especially on his The Thief's Journal. It was first published in 1952. Sartre described it as an attempt "to prove that genius is not a gift but the way out that one invents in desperate cases." Sartre also based his character Goetz in his play The Devil and the Good Lord (1951) on his analysis of Genet's psychology and morality.

== Sources ==
- Sartre, Jean-Paul. 1952. Saint Genet, comédien et martyr. In Oeuvres complètes de Jean Genet I. By Jean Genet. Paris: Éditions Gallimard.
- White, Edmund. 1993. Genet. Corrected edition. London: Picador, 1994. ISBN 0-330-30622-7.
