= Marie Gottschalk =

American political scientist

Academic work
- Discipline: Political science
- Institutions: University of Pennsylvania
- Main interests: criminal justice health policy race the welfare state
- Notable works: The Prison and the Gallows (2006); Caught (2016); Crime and No Punishment (2025)
- Notable ideas: History and critique of the American carceral state

Marie Gottschalk is an American political scientist and professor of political science at the University of Pennsylvania, known for her work on mass incarceration in the United States. Gottschalk is the author of The Prison and the Gallows: The Politics of Mass Incarceration in America (2006), Caught: the Prison State and the Lockdown of American Politics (2016) and Crime and No Punishment: Wealth, Power, and Violence in America (2025). Her research investigates the origins of the carceral state in the United States, the critiques of the scope and size of the carceral network, and the intersections of the carceral state with race and economic inequality.

== Career ==
In the 1980s she spent two years in China as a university lecturer and published on international relationships between China and the United States under the Bush administration. By 1992, after having worked as a journalist, she was associate editor of World Policy Journal (WPJ). In a 1992 WPJ article she echoed concerns expressed by Washington Post journalist, Colman McCarthy that the American media, which were under "unprecedented restrictions" during the Gulf War, was—like the "American consumer, corporation and Congress"—being profoundly re-shaped by the Bush administration. Before joining the University of Pennsylvania, she also worked as a visiting scholar at the Russell Sage Foundation and as a Fulbright Program Distinguished Lecturer in Japan. She served on the American Academy of Arts and Sciences' National Task Force on Mass Incarceration and the National Academy of Sciences' Committee on the Causes and Consequences of High Rates of Incarceration. She was featured among the experts interviewed in the Academy Award-nominated 2016 documentary 13th.

== Selected publications ==
In her widely cited 2006 book entitled, The Prison and the Gallows: The Politics of Mass Incarceration in America, Gottschalk traced the nationalization and politicization of law and order, the relationship between power and punishment, the origins and construction of the carceral state in the United States from the 1920s through the 1960s, prison activism and prison rights, public policies in the penal system, and capital punishment.

In her 2008 Annual Review of Political Science article, "Hiding in Plain Sight: American Politics and the Carceral State", she traced the "emergence, consolidation and "explosive growth" of the American carceral state as a "major milestone in American political development", that was "unprecedented" among Western countries and in US history." She called for more research on the causes and consequences of the "retributive turn" in American penal policies. She described the carceral turn in academic research from the late 1990s onwards, with disciplines, such as criminology, sociology, law, and political science, investigating "politics and the origins of the carceral state." By the 2000s, new research expanded the scope of the literature on the carceral state to include its "political consequences" and to analyse its implications. The sheer size of the carceral state was beginning to "transform fundamental democratic institutions." According to Gottschalk, democratic "free and fair elections" and "accurate and representative census" were no longer assured. The literature on American politics and the carceral state which has expanded far beyond criminal justice, included "voter turnout", the "vanishing voter," the role of neoliberalism in the economic policies of the 1990s, and the rise of the national Republican Party. She wrote that this new "scholarship on the carceral state" also raises concerns regarding "power and resistance for marginalized and stigmatized groups."

Her 2014 online publication, Caught, Gottschalk, was a scathing critique of the American carceral state, which she described as "metastasizing". She investigated the carceral phenomenon through the lens of race, sex offenders, political and economic inequality, the criminalization of immigration, recidivism, and the continuum of the carceral network beyond prison walls. It was re-published with the title, Caught: the Prison State and the Lockdown of American Politics, by Princeton University Press in 2016. She examined the impact of the Great Recession—the 2008 financial crisis— on the "Great Confinement".

In the first chapter Gottschalk described how "a tenacious carceral state has sprouted in the shadows of mass imprisonment and has been extending its reach far beyond the prison gate. It includes not only the country’s vast archipelago of jails and prisons, but also the far-reaching and growing penal punishments and controls that lies in the never-never land between the prison gate and full citizenship. As it sunders families and communities and radically reworks conceptions of democracy, rights, and citizenship, the carceral state poses a formidable political and social challenge." She said that until the carceral turn in the social sciences in the late 1990s, "mass imprisonment was largely an invisible issue in the United States". By 2014, there was widespread criticism of mass incarceration but very modest reform.

In her 2025 book Crime and No Punishment: Wealth, Power, and Violence in America, Gottschalk argues that the United States is an extremely militarized, violent and lethal country characterized by the almost complete lack of corporate accountability, the increased financialization of the economy, unchecked neoliberalism, a militarized police force, very high rates of incarceration and a gargantuan prison system, and endless wars in Iraq, Afghanistan and beyond. It punishes and incarcerates the poor and marginalized while white collar and corporate crime goes unnoticed and unpunished, even though it is far more impactful on people’s lives than street and drug crimes. She contends the increased concentration of economic, military and political power is draining communities of much needed resources which has the effect of normalizing death and violence, with rising deaths of despair among the working class and decreased life expectancy. This is undermining the legitimacy of the economic and political institutions of the United States, fostering political instability and paving the way for the country to descend into a failed state.

== Reviews and mentions ==
Gottschalk is widely cited in research related to the carceral state. Peter K. Enns, who is the author of Incarceration Nation: How the United States Became the Most Punitive Democracy in the World (2016) described Gottschalk's 2006 The Prison and the Gallows, as "pathbreaking." Enns agrees with Gottschalk's conclusion that policymakers overestimate the public's opinion on crime as more punitive than it is. He cites Gottschalk's Caught, saying that statistics on the millions in America's jails and prisons, understate the "scope of the carceral state", which more than triples when including those on probation and parole.

=== 13th and Supreme Court citation ===
Gottschalk is seen as one of the experts interviewed for the 2016 Netflix documentary, 13th by director Ava DuVernay. The film explores the "intersection of race, justice, and mass incarceration in the United States." Its title refers to the 1865 Thirteenth Amendment to the United States Constitution, which abolished slavery, "except as a punishment for crime whereof the party shall have been duly convicted." Gottschalk's Caught was cited by Supreme Court Justice Sonia Sotomayor in her dissenting opinion in Utah v. Strieff (2016).

== Awards and honors ==
The Prison and the Gallows won the 2007 Ellis W. Hawley Prize from the Organization of American Historians,

Caught won the 2016 Michael Harrington Book Award from the New Political Science Section of the American Political Science Association.
