= Frédéric-Auguste Demetz =

French penal reformer (1796-1873)

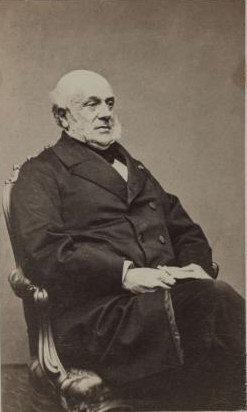

Frédéric-Auguste Demetz (1796–1873) was a French penal reformer and jurist. He toured the United States in 1836, together with the architect Guillaume-Abel Blouet, to study progressive American prison architecture and administration for the French Ministry of the Interior. Upon their return, they published a detailed and laudatory report. The result was Blouet's appointment as Inspecteur général des prisons in 1838, and a prison farm for juvenile offenders at Mettray, on the outskirts of Tours, founded in 1839; it was conceived by both men and directed by Demetz, as a prison without walls, with the backing of the vicomte de Bretignières de Courteilles.
