= Jean-Baptiste Rondelet =

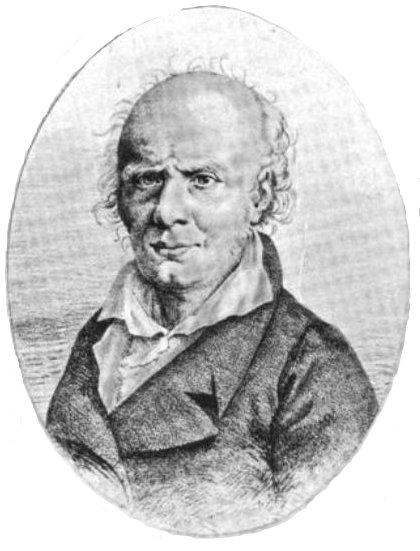
- Born: 4 June 1743; Lyon, France
- Died: 25 September 1829 (aged 86); Paris, France
- Occupation: Architect
- Buildings: Church of Sainte-Geneviève

Jean-Baptiste Rondelet (French pronunciation: [ʒɑ̃ batist ʁɔ̃dlɛ]; 4 June 1743 – 25 September 1829) was an architectural theorist of the late Enlightenment era and chief architect of the church of Sainte-Geneviève after the death of Jacques Germain Soufflot of cancer in 1780.

Rondelet published a treatise on architecture between 1805 and 1816.
