= List of Jewish atheists and agnostics =

This page lists well-known Jewish atheists and agnostics. Based on Jewish law's emphasis on matrilineal descent, religiously conservative Orthodox Jewish authorities would accept an atheist born to a Jewish mother as fully Jewish. A 2011 study found that half of all American Jews have doubts about the existence of God, compared to 10–15% of other American religious groups.

== Entertainment ==
=== Cinema ===
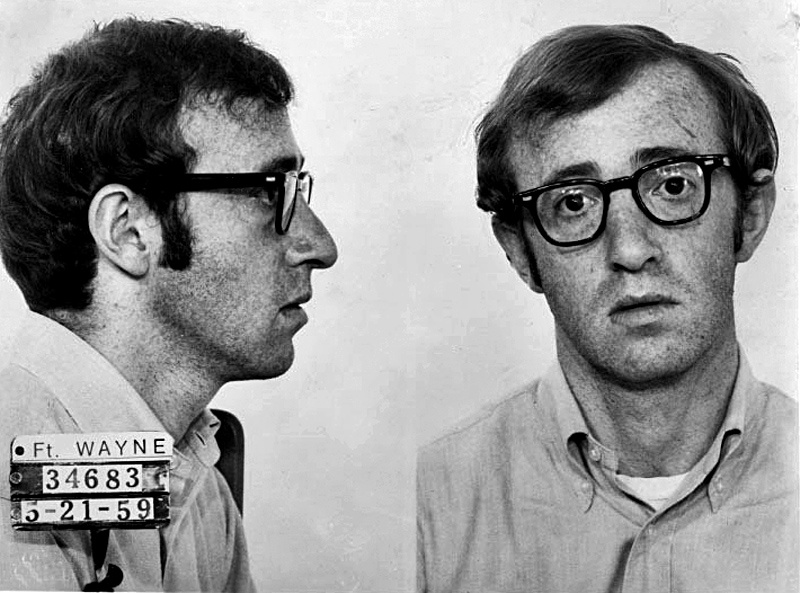
Woody Allen in Take the Money and Run (1969)

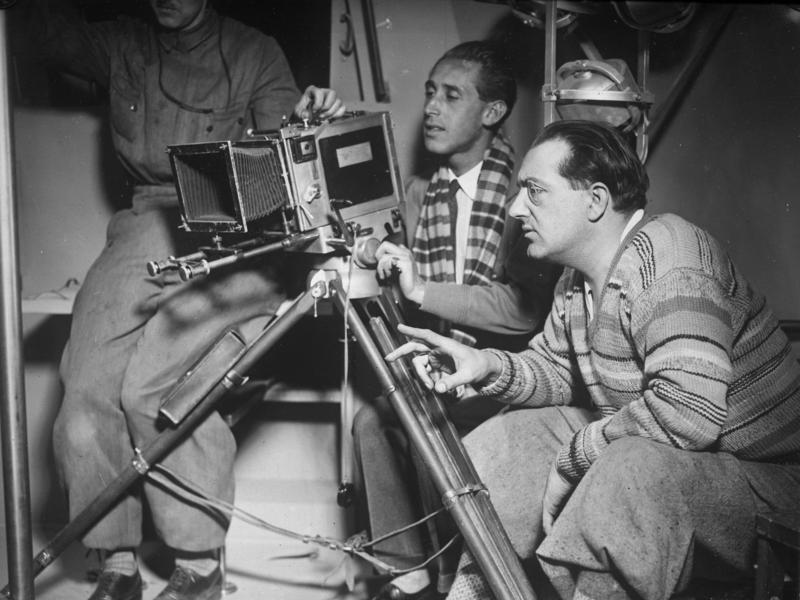
Fritz Lang

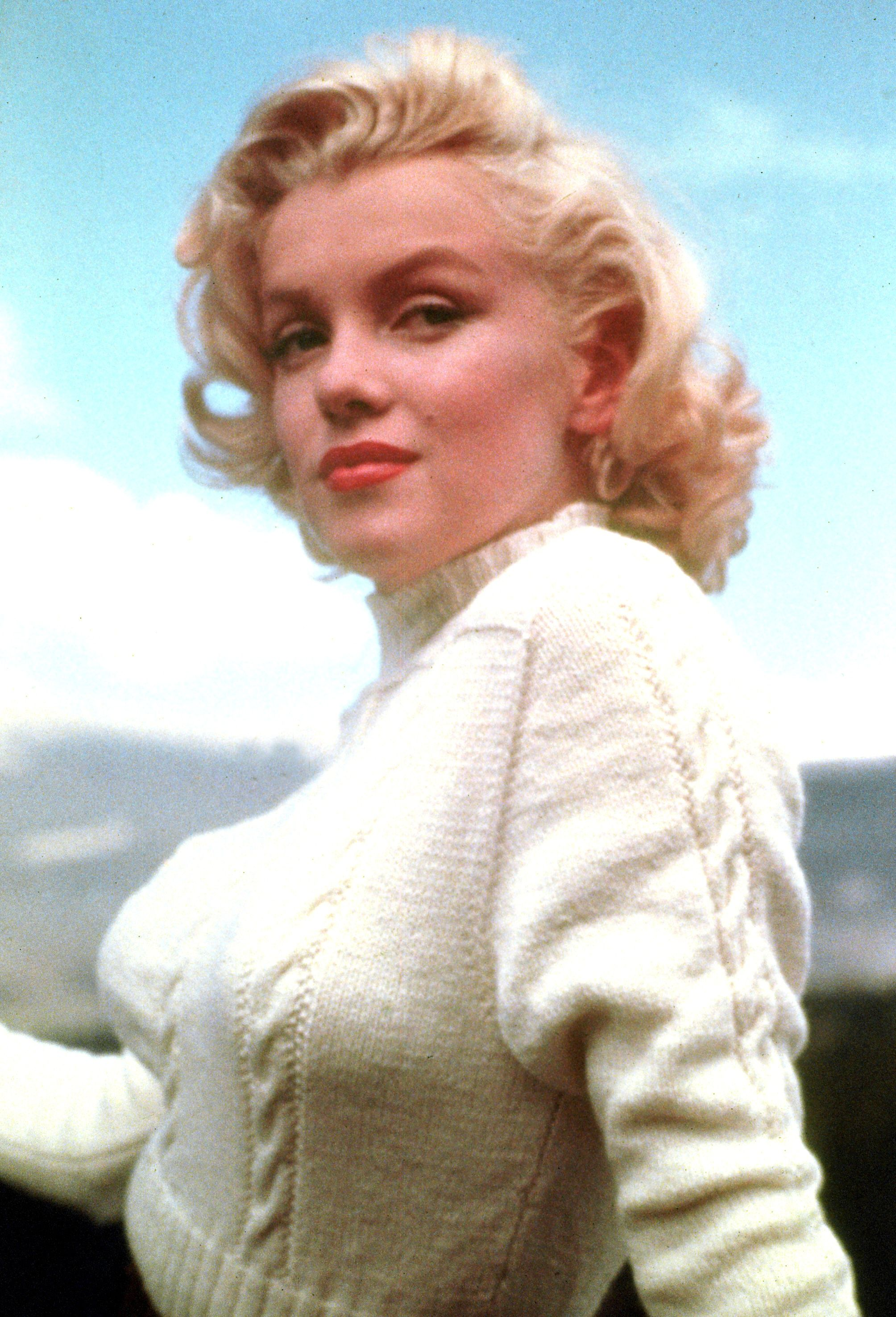
Marilyn Monroe

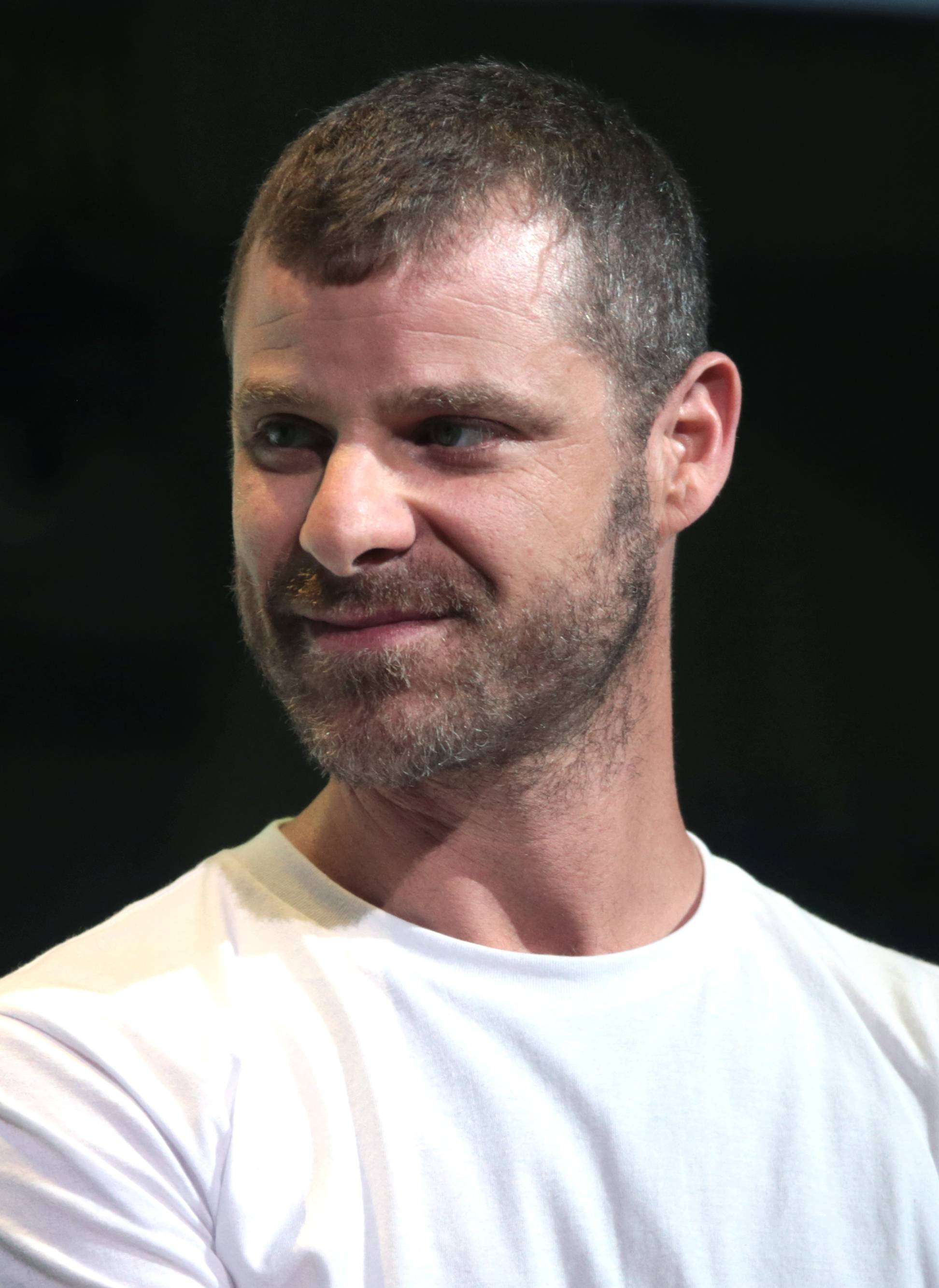
Matt Stone

- Woody Allen – American screenwriter, director, actor, comedian, author, playwright, and musician
- David Cronenberg – Canadian filmmaker, screenwriter and actor, one of the principal originators of what is commonly known as the body horror or venereal horror genre
- Stanley Donen – film director and choreographer whose most celebrated works are Singin' in the Rain and On the Town
- Richard Dreyfuss (self-described agnostic) – American actor
- Sergei Eisenstein – Soviet Russian film director and film theorist
- Harvey Fierstein – American actor, playwright, winner of two Tony Awards
- Stephen Fry – English actor, screenwriter, author, playwright, journalist, poet, comedian, television presenter, film director and a director of Norwich City Football Club
- Keith Gordon – American actor and film director
- Nina Hartley – American pornographic actress, pornographic film director, sex educator, feminist, and author
- Alejandro Jodorowsky – Chilean director
- Walter Koenig - American actor and screenwriter.
- Stanley Kubrick – American film director, writer, film producer, and photographer
- John Landis – American film director, screenwriter, actor, producer, collaborated with Michael Jackson
- Fritz Lang – Austrian-American filmmaker, screenwriter, and occasional film producer and actor.
- Marilyn Monroe (1926–1962) – American actress, model, and singer (converted to Reform Judaism to marry Arthur Miller, and remained within Judaism even after her divorce from him).
- Daniel Radcliffe (self-described atheist) – English actor, protagonist of Harry Potter film series
- Harold Ramis (irreligious, agnostic) – American actor, director, and writer specializing in comedy.
- Carl Reiner (self-described Jewish atheist) – American actor, film director, producer, writer, comedian, won nine Emmy Awards and one Grammy Award
- Rob Reiner – American actor, film director, producer, and political activist
- Wallace Shawn, American actor, playwright, essayist, screenwriter, atheist.
- Adrienne Shelly (agnostic) – American actor, screenwriter and director
- Todd Solondz – American independent film screenwriter and director known for his style of dark, thought-provoking, socially conscious satire
- Matt Stone – American actor, voice actor, animator, screenwriter, producer, musician, South Park
- Gene Wilder – American actor

=== Comedy ===
- Eric Andre (atheist and practitioner of Transcendental Meditation) – American comedian, actor, producer, and musician.
- David Baddiel ("fundamentalist Jewish atheist") – British comedian and television presenter
- Jack Black – American comedian, actor and musician, Frat Pack comedian group, Golden Globe award
- Michael Ian Black – American comedian, actor, writer, director.
- Rodney Dangerfield (self-described "Logical atheist") – American stand-up comedian.
- David Cross – American actor and comedian
- Larry David (1947–) – American actor, writer, comedian, and producer
- Jay Foreman (1984–) – English YouTuber, singer-songwriter, and comedian.
- Myq Kaplan – American stand-up comedian
- Fran Lebowitz (1950–) – American author, humorist and public speaker.
- Marc Maron (negative atheist) – American stand-up comedian, radio and podcast host
- Sarah Silverman (irreligious agnostic) – American comedian, writer, actor, singer, musician
- Jon Stewart – American comedian, writer, producer, director, political commentator, actor, and television host.

=== Comic book writers ===
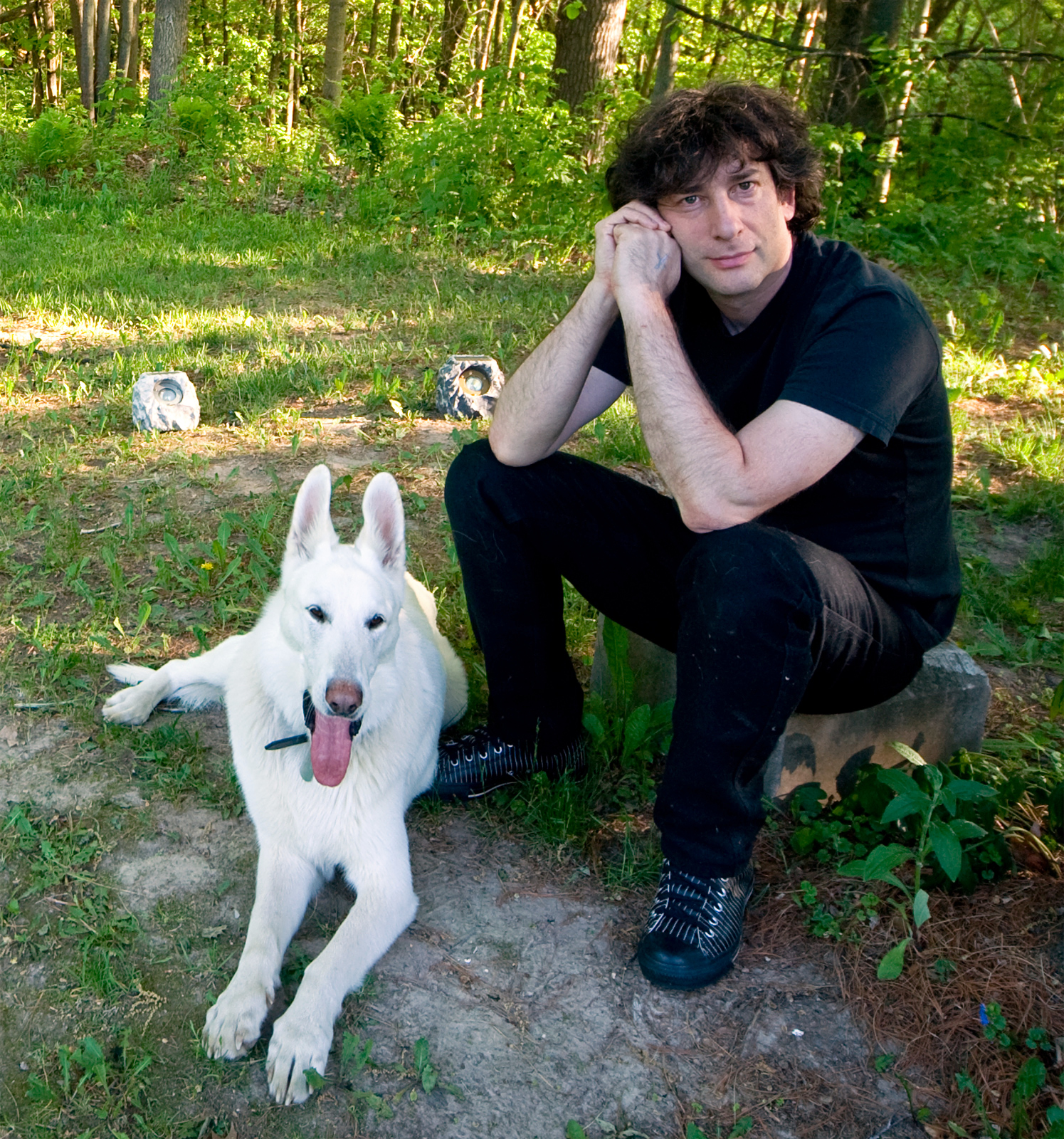
Neil Gaiman

- Neil Gaiman (agnostic) – English author of short fiction, novels, comic books, graphic novels, audio theatre and films; works include the comic book series The Sandman and novels Stardust, American Gods, Coraline, and The Graveyard Book

=== Comic book editors ===
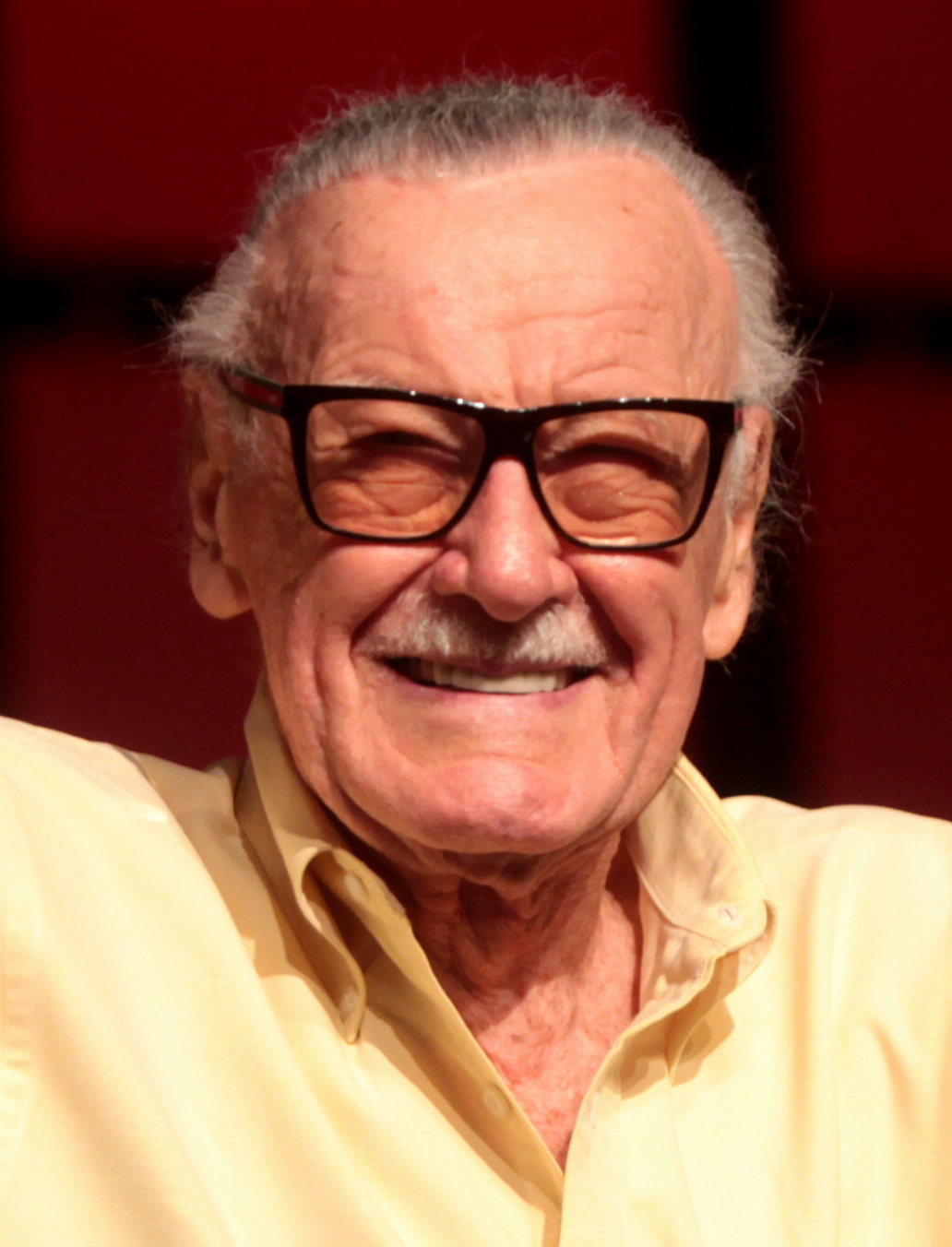
Stan Lee

- Stan Lee (agnostic) – American comic book writer, editor, actor, producer, publisher, television personality, and the former president and chairman of Marvel Comics

=== Music ===
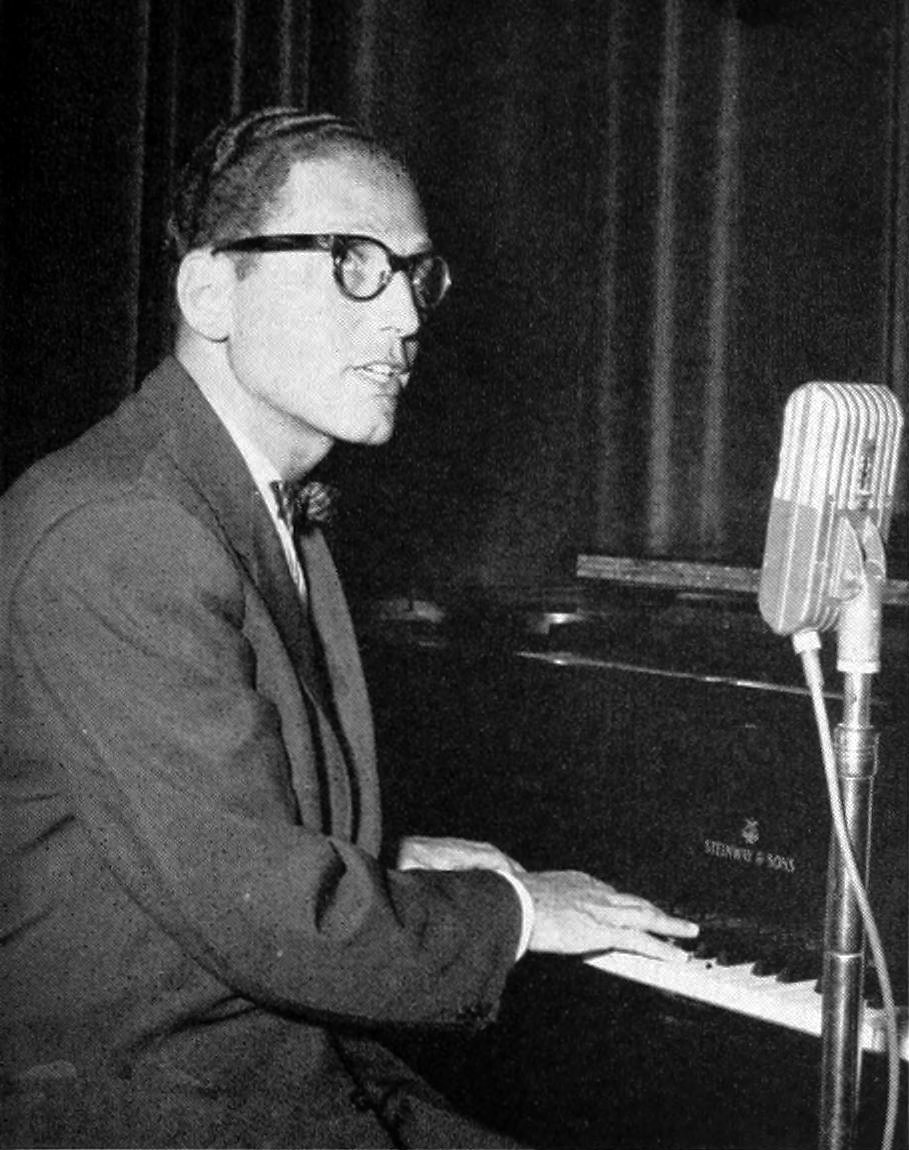
Tom Lehrer

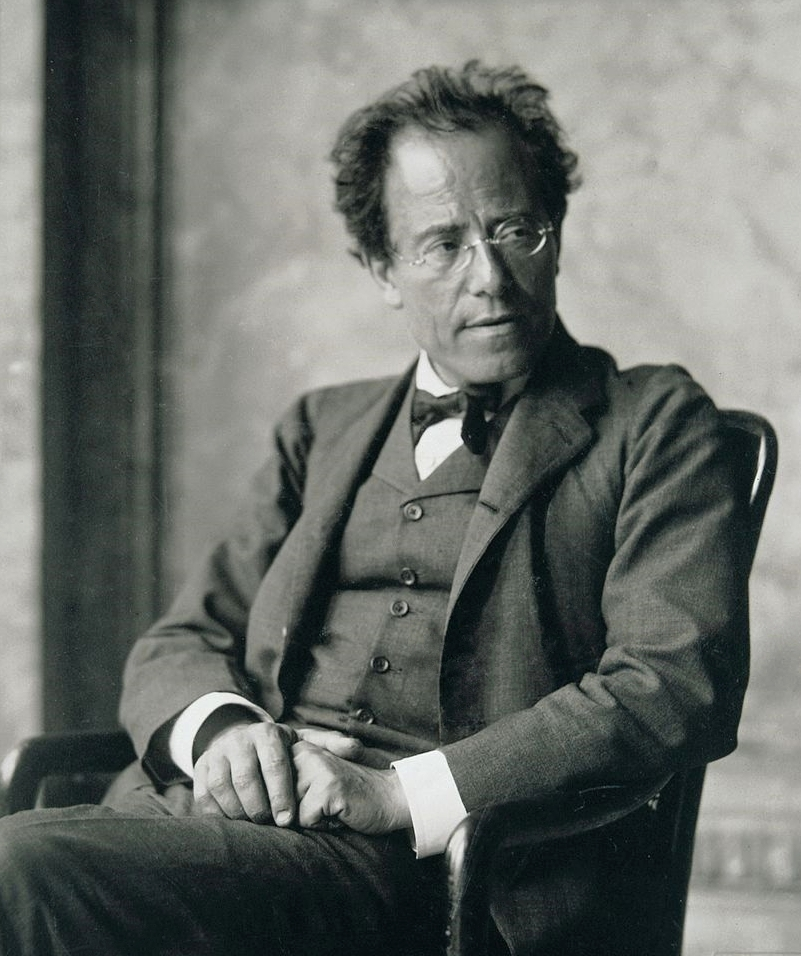
Gustav Mahler

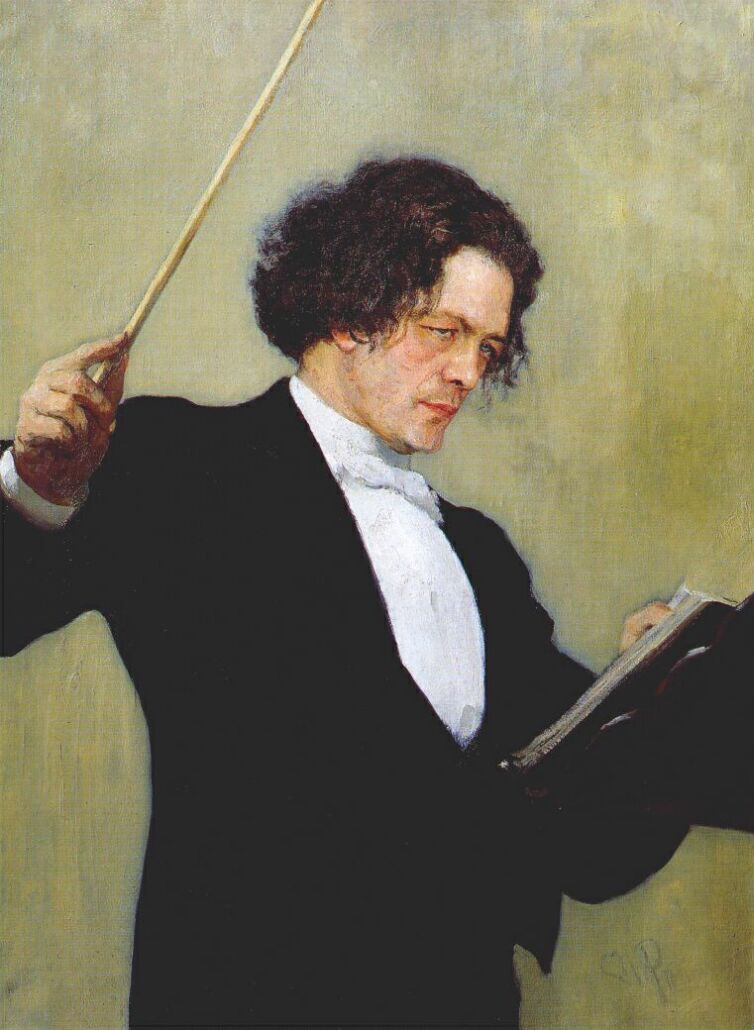
Anton Rubinstein

- Larry Adler – American musician, widely acknowledged as one of the world's most skilled harmonica players
- Irving Berlin (agnostic) – American composer and lyricist of Jewish heritage, widely considered one of the greatest songwriters in American history
- Aaron Copland (agnostic) – American composer
- Shalom Hanoch – Israeli rock singer, lyricist, composer, father of Israeli rock
- Richard Hell – American singer, songwriter, bass guitarist, and writer
- Billy Joel (1949–) – American pianist, singer-songwriter and composer.
- Howard Kaylan – American rock and roll musician, best known as a founding member and lead singer of the 1960s band The Turtles, and as "Eddie" in the 1970s rock band Flo & Eddie.
- Geddy Lee – Canadian musician, best known as the lead vocalist, bassist, and keyboardist for the Canadian rock group Rush
- Tom Lehrer (agnostic atheist) – American singer-songwriter, satirist, pianist, and mathematician
- Jenny Lewis – American singer-songwriter musician and actress
- Gustav Mahler (agnostic) – Late-Romantic Austrian composer and one of the leading conductors of his generation
- Randy Newman – American singer-songwriter, arranger, composer, and pianist, known for his distinctive voice, mordant (and often satirical) pop songs and for film scores
- Anton Rubinstein – Russian pianist, composer and conductor who became a pivotal figure in Russian culture when he founded the Saint Petersburg Conservatory.
- Kurt Weill (agnostic) – German composer

=== Radio ===
- Ira Glass – host of This American Life
- Larry King – American television and radio host.

=== Sports/games ===
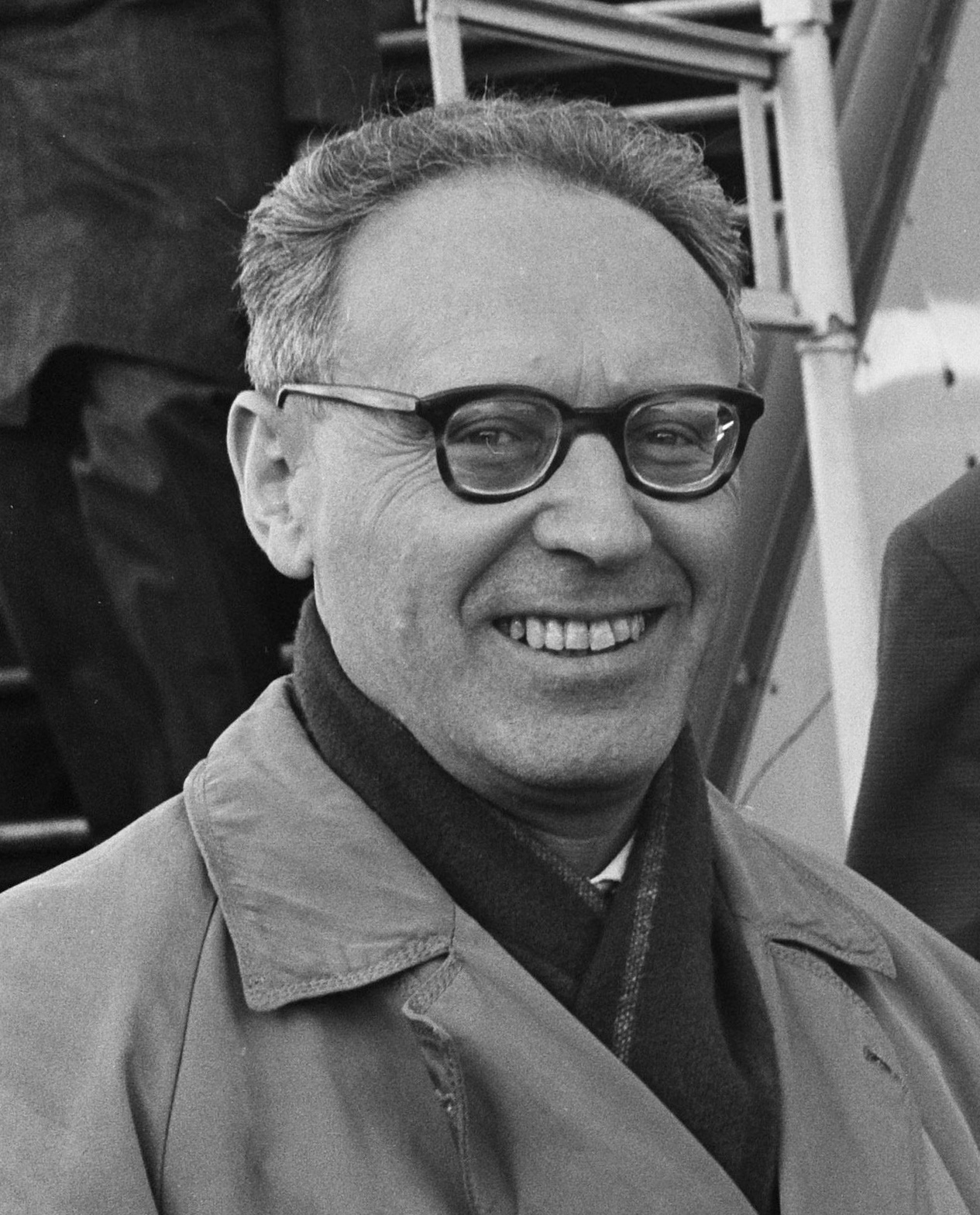
Mikhail Botvinnik

- Mikhail Botvinnik (1911–1995) – Soviet and Russian grandmaster and three-time World Chess Champion, widely considered one of the greatest chess players of all time

== Humanities ==
=== Archaeology ===
- Eleazar Sukenik – Israeli archaeologist and professor of Hebrew University in Jerusalem, undertaking excavations in Jerusalem, and recognising the importance of the Dead Sea Scrolls to Israel

=== Arts ===
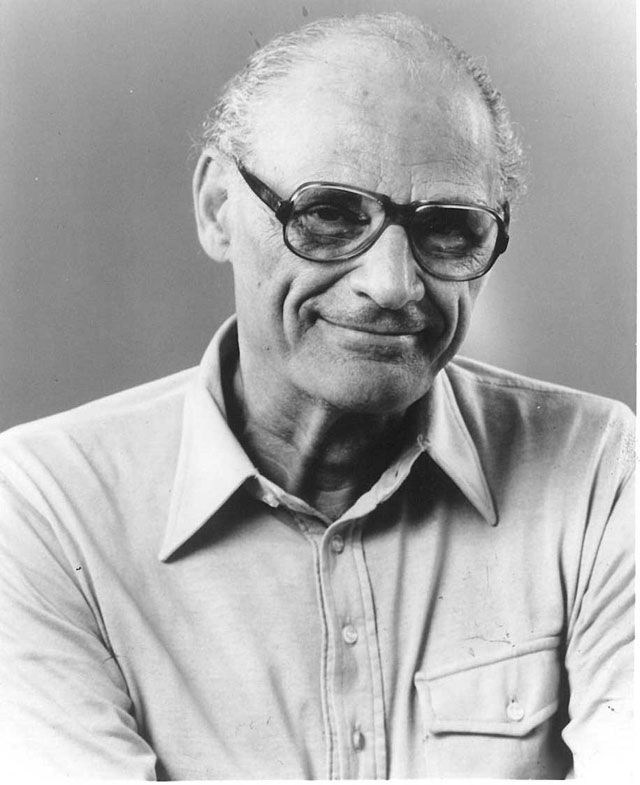
Arthur Miller

- Ernst L. Freud – Austrian architect, youngest son of Austrian psychoanalyst Sigmund Freud
- James Lipton – American writer, actor, dean emeritus of the Actors Studio Drama School at Pace University and host of Inside the Actors Studio
- Arthur Miller – American playwright and essayist.
- Jonathan Miller – English theatre and opera director.
- Hannah Moscovitch – Canadian playwright
- Julia Pascal – British playwright and theater director
- Harold Rubin (positive atheist) – South African-born Israeli visual artist and free jazz clarinettist

=== Historians ===
- Isaiah Berlin (agnostic) – British social and political theorist, philosopher and historian of ideas of Russian-Jewish origin, thought by many to be the dominant scholar of his generation
- Raul Hilberg – Austrian-born American political scientist, scholar of the Holocaust, The Destruction of the European Jews
- Derek J. de Solla Price – British-American historian of science
- Adam Bruno Ulam (agnostic) – Polish and American historian and political scientist at Harvard University; one of the world's foremost authorities on Russia and the Soviet Union; author of twenty books and many articles
- Howard Zinn – American historian, playwright, and activist.
- Yuval Noah Harari – Israeli historian and popular science author. "History began when humans invented gods, and will end when humans become gods"
- Jessica Riskin - American historian of science.

=== Law ===
- Cesare Lombroso – Italian criminologist and physician, founder of the Italian School of Positivist Criminology

=== Literature ===
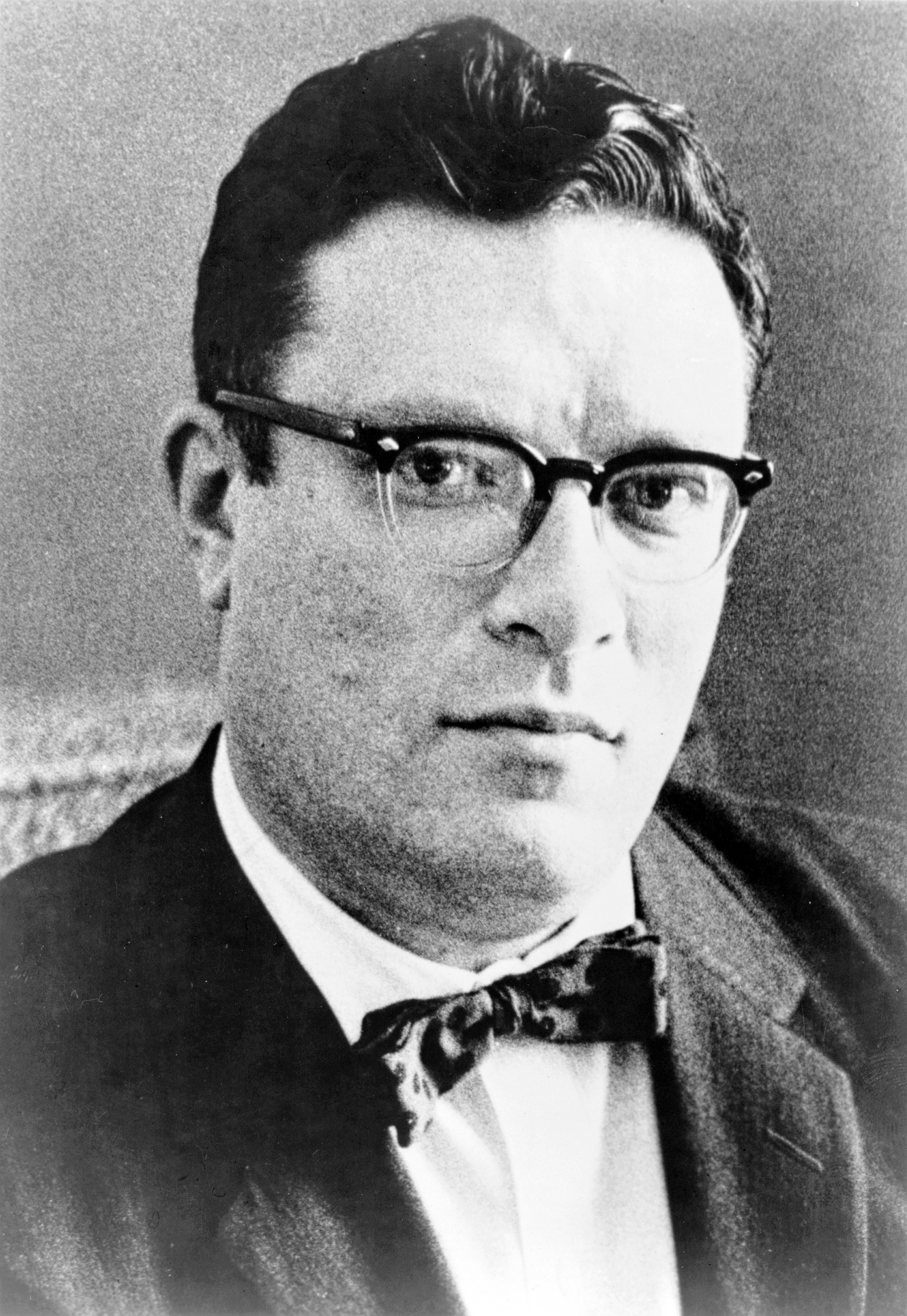
Isaac Asimov

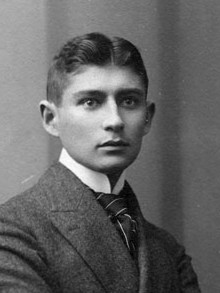
Franz Kafka

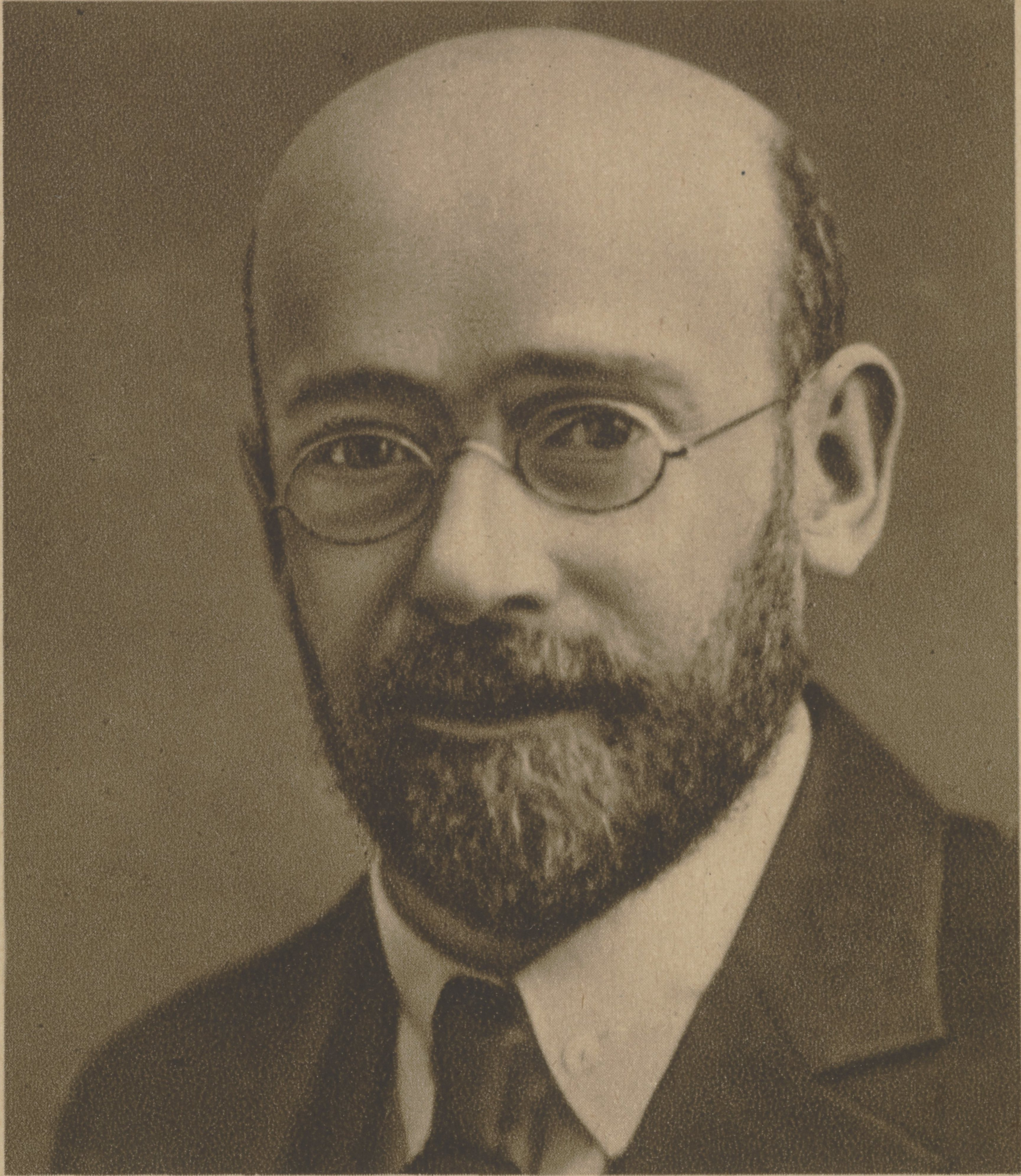
Janusz Korczak

Primo Levi

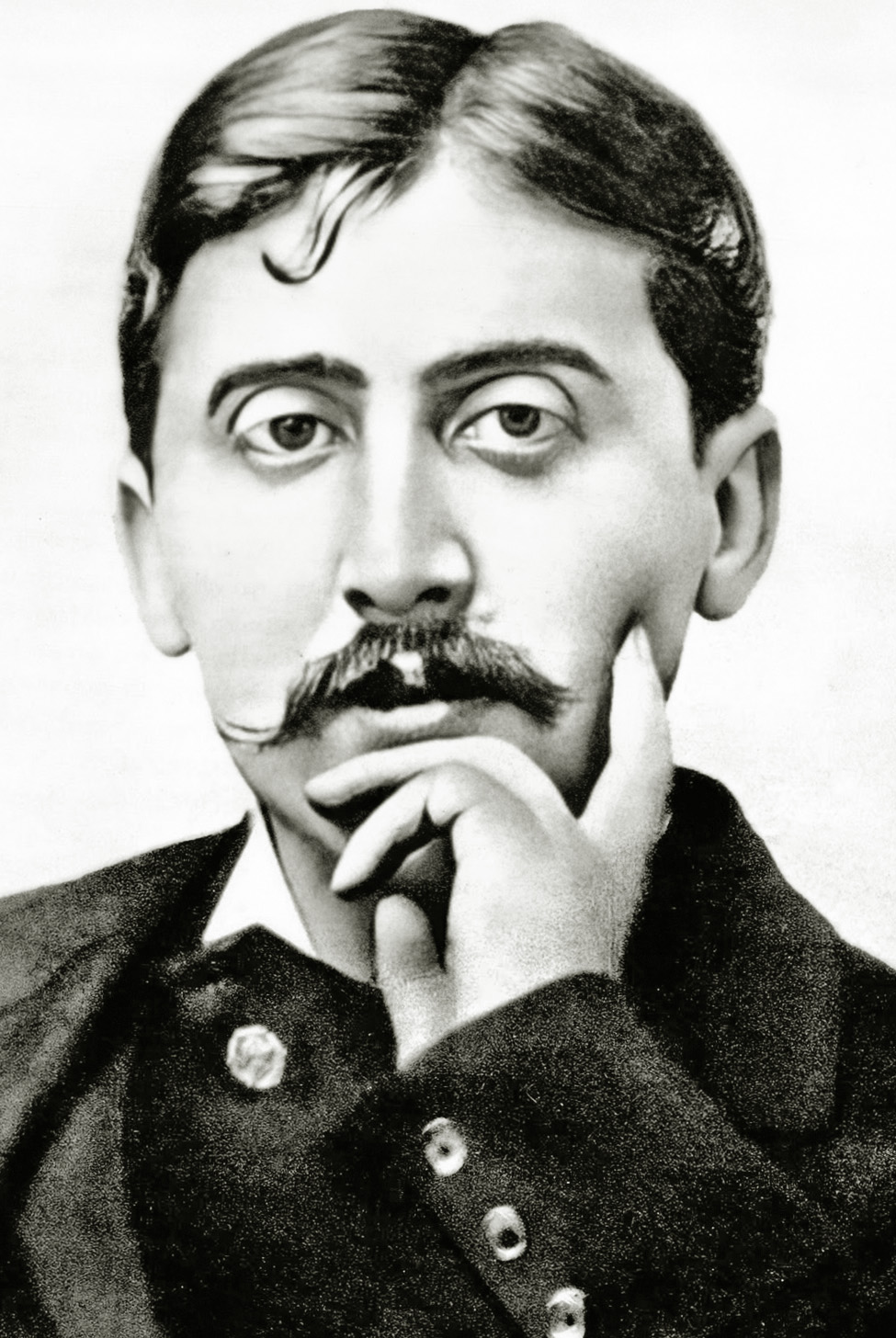
Marcel Proust

- Isaac Asimov (atheist, humanist and rationalist, identified as "non-observant Jew") – American author and professor of biochemistry at Boston University, best known for his works of science fiction and for his popular science books
- Howard Bloom – American author and scientific thinker
- Alain de Botton – Swiss writer, philosopher, television presenter and entrepreneur, resident in the United Kingdom, author of Religion for Atheists
- Lawrence Bush – author of several books of Jewish fiction and non-fiction, including Waiting for God: The Spiritual Explorations of a Reluctant Atheist and Bessie: A Novel of Love and Revolution
- Daniel Handler – American author better known under the pen name of Lemony Snicket; has declared himself to be "pretty much an atheist" and a secular humanist; has hinted that the Baudelaires in his children's book series A Series of Unfortunate Events might be atheists
- Franz Kafka (agnostic atheist) – influential Czech-born German-language author of novels and short stories
- Janusz Korczak (agnostic) – Polish-Jewish educator, children's author and pediatrician; after spending many years working as director of an orphanage in Warsaw, he refused freedom and remained with the orphans as they were sent to Treblinka extermination camp during the Grossaktion Warsaw of 1942
- Primo Levi – Italian chemist and writer best known for If This Is a Man, an account of his year in Auschwitz
- Albert Memmi - a French-Tunisian Jewish writer and essayist.
- Sami Michael – Iraqi-Israeli author, President of the Association for Civil Rights in Israel (ACRI)
- Leonard Peikoff – author, philosopher, founder of the Ayn Rand Institute
- Harold Pinter* – Nobel Prize-winning English playwright, screenwriter, director and actor; one of the most influential modern British dramatists, his writing career spanned more than 50 years
- Maurice Bernard Sendak – American writer and illustrator of children's literature, Where the Wild Things Are
- Israel Zangwill – British humorist and writer

==== Literary critics ====
- Calel Perechodnik (1916–1943) – Polish Jewish diarist and Jewish Ghetto policeman at the Warsaw Ghetto
- Marcel Reich-Ranicki – Polish-born German literary critic and member of the literary group Gruppe 47
- Susan Sontag (1933–2004) – American writer, critic and public intellectual.

==== Novelists ====
- Rebecca Goldstein – American philosophical novelist, essayist, and "New New Atheist" who authored 36 Arguments for the Existence of God: A Work of Fiction
- Stanisław Lem – Polish science fiction novelist and essayist
- Marcel Proust (agnostic atheist) – French novelist, critic, and essayist; best known for his work In Search of Lost Time
- Ayn Rand – Russian-American novelist, playwright, screenwriter, ethical egoist, rationalist, free-market capitalist, founder of the Objectivist philosophy
- Philip Roth – American novelist: Goodbye, Columbus; Portnoy's Complaint
- Boris Strugatsky (agnostic atheist) – Russian science fiction novelist; known for co-writing the science fiction novel Roadside Picnic

=== Philosophy ===
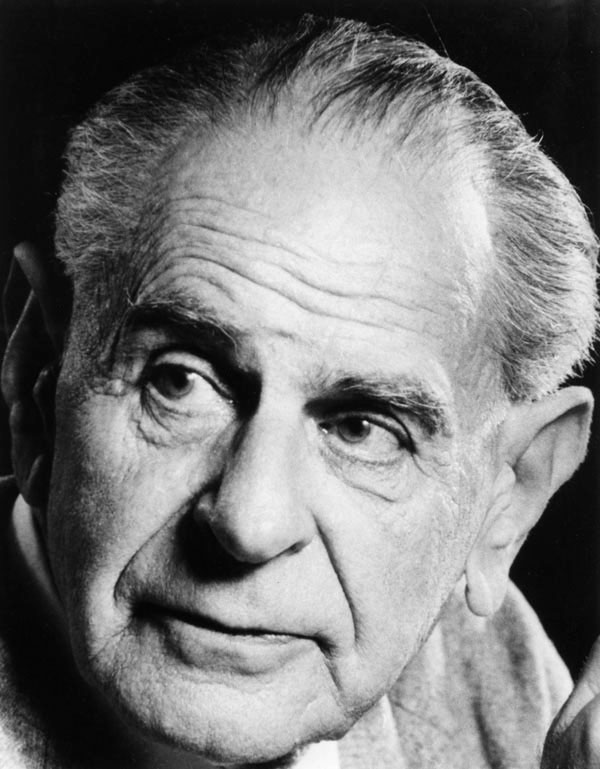
Karl Popper

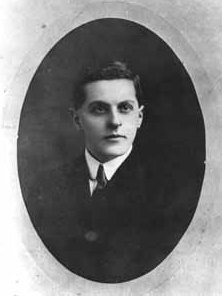
Ludwig Wittgenstein

- Jacques Derrida – French philosopher, deconstruction, continental philosophy
- Paul Edwards – Austrian-American ethicist
- Sidney Hook (agnostic) – American philosopher of the Pragmatist school, known for his contributions to the philosophy of history, the philosophy of education, political theory, and ethics
- Karl Popper (agnostic) – Austro-British philosopher, advocate of liberal democracy and free markets, founding member of the Mont Pelerin Society, professor at London School of Economics, falsifiability
- Peter Singer – Australian ethicist at Princeton University, animal rights advocate
- Ludwig Wittgenstein (agnostic) – Austrian-British philosopher who worked primarily in logic, the philosophy of mathematics, the philosophy of mind, and the philosophy of language.

== Formal, natural and applied sciences ==
Nobel laureates are marked with an asterisk (*).

=== Astronomy and cosmology ===
- Ralph Alpher (agnostic/humanist) – American cosmologist; known for the seminal paper on Big Bang nucleosynthesis, the Alpher–Bethe–Gamow paper
- Hermann Bondi – Anglo-Austrian mathematician and cosmologist, developed steady-state theory, contributed to general theory of relativity
- Carl Sagan (agnostic nontheist) – American astronomer, astrophysicist, cosmologist, author, science popularizer, and science communicator in astronomy and natural sciences, Cornell University
- Dennis W. Sciama (1926–1999) – British physicist who played a major role in developing British physics after the Second World War. His most significant work was in general relativity, with and without quantum theory, and black holes. He helped revitalize the classical relativistic alternative to general relativity known as Einstein-Cartan gravity. He is considered one of the fathers of modern cosmology.

=== Biology and medicine ===
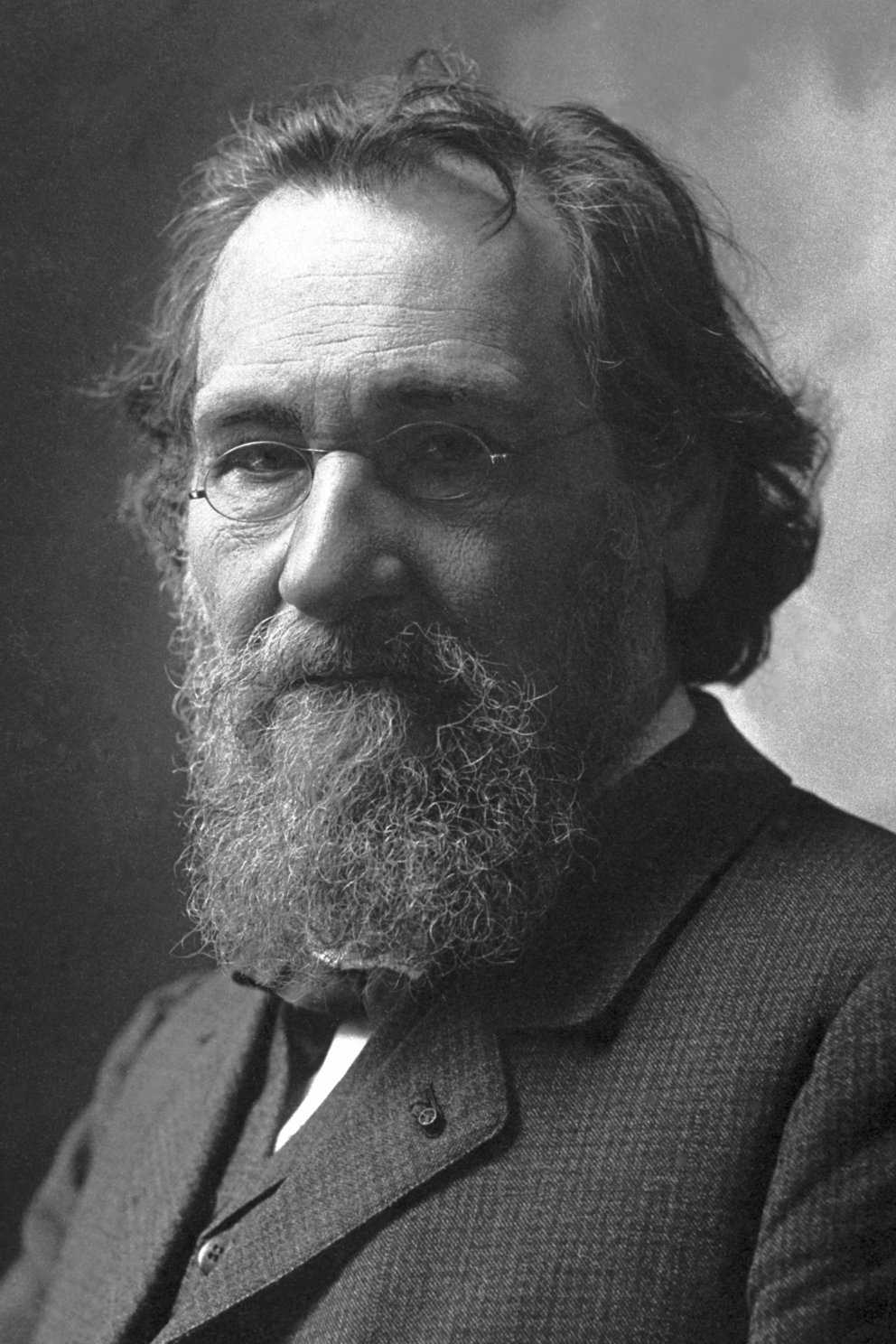
Élie Metchnikoff

- Julius Axelrod* – American biochemist, reuptake of catecholamine neurotransmitters, pineal gland, share of the Nobel Prize in Physiology or Medicine
- Rosalind Franklin (agnostic) – British biophysicist and X-ray crystallographer who made critical contributions to the understanding of the fine molecular structures of DNA, RNA, viruses, coal and graphite
- Stephen Jay Gould (agnostic) – American paleontologist, evolutionary biologist, science historian and popularizer. Gould called himself a "Jewish agnostic".
- François Jacob* – French biologist; with Jacques Monod, originated the idea that control of enzyme levels in all cells occurs through feedback on transcription; Nobel Prize in Medicine
- Rita Levi-Montalcini* (1909–2012) – Italian neurologist; with colleague Stanley Cohen, received the 1986 Nobel Prize in Physiology or Medicine for their discovery of nerve growth factor
- Élie Metchnikoff* – Russian biologist, zoologist and protozoologist; known for his research into the immune system; received the Nobel Prize in Medicine in 1908, shared with Paul Ehrlich
- Max Perutz* – Austrian-born British molecular biologist; shared the 1962 Nobel Prize for Chemistry with John Kendrew, for their studies of the structures of hemoglobin and globular proteins
- Oliver Sacks – British neurologist, who has written popular books about his patients, the most famous of which is Awakenings.
- Robert Sapolsky – American neuroscientist, author, Stanford University
- George Wald* – American scientist; known for his work with pigments in the retina; won a share of the 1967 Nobel Prize in Physiology or Medicine with Haldan Keffer Hartline and Ragnar Granit
- Lewis Wolpert – developmental biologist, author, and broadcaster

=== Chemistry ===
- Roald Hoffmann* – American theoretical chemist; recipient of the 1981 Nobel Prize in Chemistry
- Jerome Karle* (agnostic) – American physical chemist; with Herbert A. Hauptman, was awarded the Nobel Prize in Chemistry in 1985, for the direct analysis of crystal structures using X-ray scattering techniques
- Harry Kroto* ("devout atheist") – British chemist, share of the Nobel Prize in Chemistry
- George Olah* (agnostic) – 1994 Nobel Laureate in Chemistry, discoverer of superacids
- Dan Shechtman* – 2011 recipient of the Nobel Prize in Chemistry

=== Computer science and artificial intelligence ===
- Scott Aaronson (self-described "disbelieving atheist infidel heretic") – American theoretical computer scientist and professor at University of Texas at Austin
- Jacob Appelbaum – American computer security researcher and hacker; a core member of the Tor project
- John McCarthy – American computer scientist and cognitive scientist; coined the term "artificial intelligence" (AI) and was influential in its early development; developed the Lisp programming language family; significantly influenced the design of the ALGOL programming language; popularized timesharing; won the Turing Award in 1971
- Marvin Minsky – American cognitive scientist and computer scientist in the field of artificial intelligence (AI) at MIT; won the Turing Award in 1969
- Judea Pearl – Israeli American computer scientist and philosopher; known for championing the probabilistic approach to artificial intelligence and the development of Bayesian networks; won the Turing Award in 2011
- Richard Stallman – American software freedom activist, hacker, and software developer
- Aaron Swartz (1986–2012) – American computer programmer, writer, political organizer and Internet activist; was involved in the development of the web feed format RSS, the organization Creative Commons, the website framework web.py, and the social news site Reddit, in which he was an equal partner after its merger with his company Infogami
- Eliezer Yudkowsky – American artificial intelligence researcher concerned with the singularity and an advocate of friendly artificial intelligence

=== Engineering ===
- Hertha Marks Ayrton (agnostic) – English engineer, mathematician and inventor
- Emile Berliner (agnostic) – German-born American inventor; known for developing the disc record gramophone (phonograph)
- Dennis Gabor* – Hungarian-British electrical engineer and inventor; known for his invention of holography; received the 1971 Nobel Prize in Physics

=== Mathematics ===
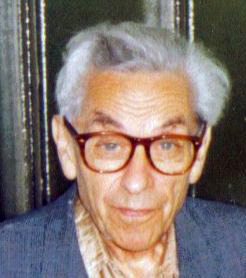
Paul Erdős

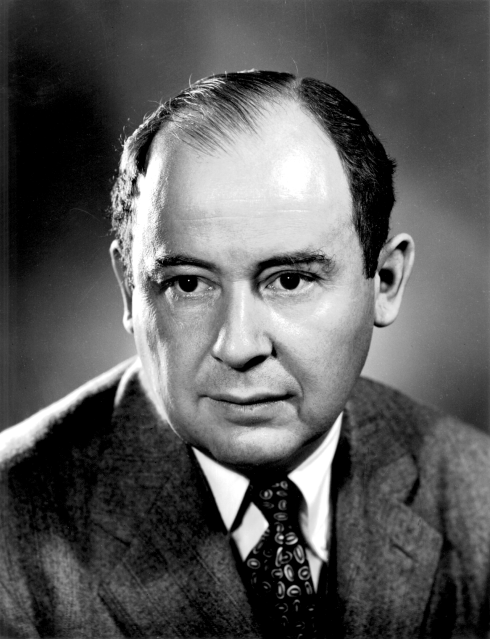
John von Neumann

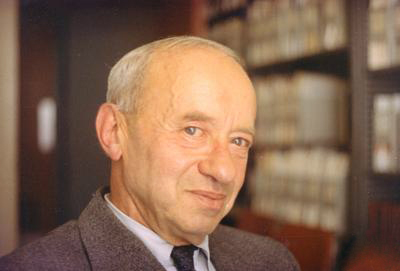
Alfred Tarski

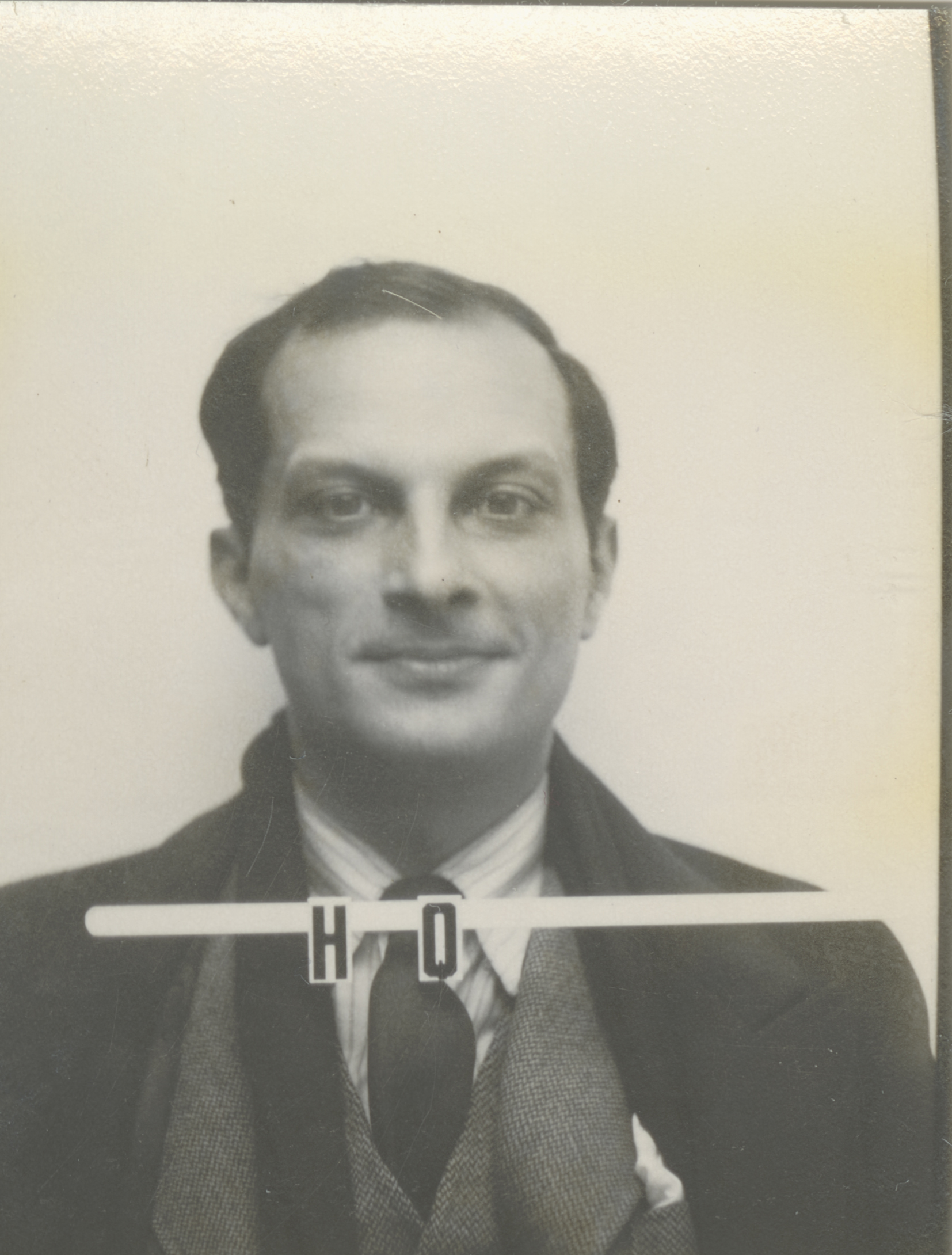
Stanislaw Ulam

- Richard E. Bellman – American applied mathematician, known for his invention of dynamic programming in 1953, and important contributions in other fields of mathematics.
- Jacob Bronowski (agnostic) – Polish-Jewish British mathematician, biologist, historian of science, theatre author, poet and inventor; presenter and writer of the 1973 BBC television documentary series The Ascent of Man, and the accompanying book
- Paul Erdős – (agnostic atheist) Hungarian mathematician, published more papers than any other mathematician in history
- Jacques Hadamard – French mathematician; made major contributions in number theory, complex function theory, differential geometry and partial differential equations
- Herbert A. Hauptman* – American mathematician; with Jerome Karle, won the Nobel Prize in Chemistry in 1985
- Samuel Karlin – American mathematician, Stanford University
- John von Neumann (agnostic; converted to Roman Catholicism in his final days) – Hungarian-American mathematician and polymath who made major contributions to a vast number of fields, including mathematics, physics, economics, and statistics
- George Pólya (agnostic) – Hungarian Jewish mathematician; professor of mathematics from 1914 to 1940 at ETH Zürich and from 1940 to 1953 at Stanford University; made fundamental contributions to combinatorics, number theory, numerical analysis and probability theory; noted for his work in heuristics and mathematics education
- Laurent Schwartz (1915–2002) – French mathematician; awarded the Fields Medal for his work on distributions
- William James Sidis – American mathematician, cosmologist, inventor, linguist, historian and child prodigy
- Alan Sokal (1955–) – American professor of mathematics at University College London and professor of physics at New York University; known for his criticism of postmodernism, resulting in the Sokal affair in 1996
- Hugo Steinhaus – Polish mathematician and educator
- Alfred Tarski – Polish logician and mathematician; prolific author known for his work on model theory, metamathematics, and algebraic logic
- Stanislaw Ulam (agnostic) – Polish-Jewish mathematician; participated in America's Manhattan Project, originated the Teller–Ulam design of thermonuclear weapons, invented the Monte Carlo method of computation, and suggested nuclear pulse propulsion
- André Weil (agnostic) – French mathematician; known for his foundational work in number theory and algebraic geometry
- Norbert Wiener (agnostic) – American mathematician and child prodigy; regarded as the originator of cybernetics
- Oscar Zariski (1899–1986) – American mathematician and one of the most influential algebraic geometers of the 20th century

=== Physics ===
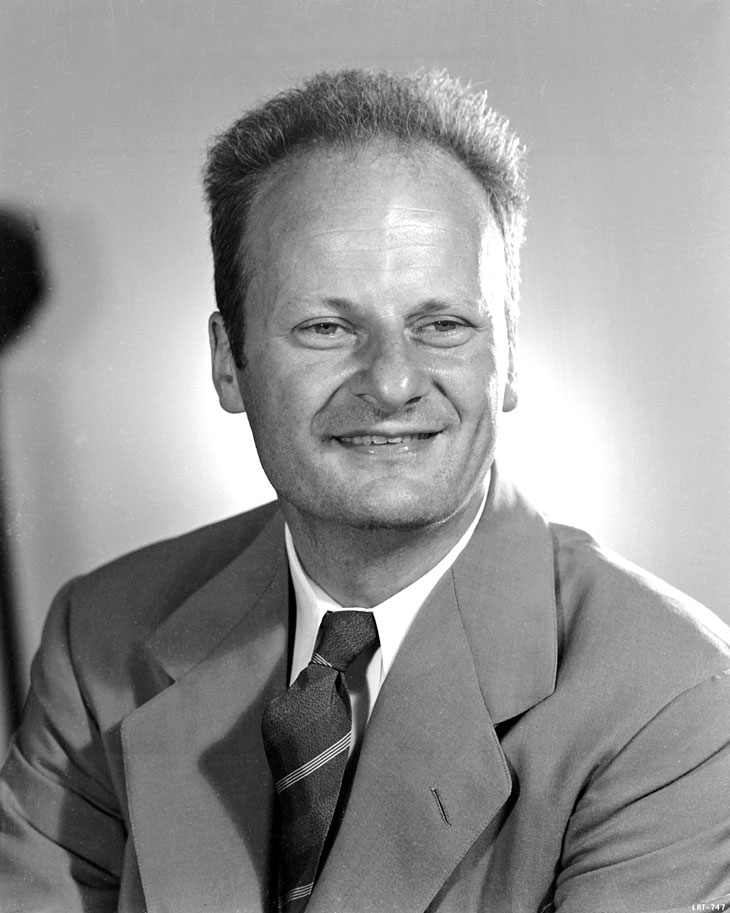
Hans Bethe

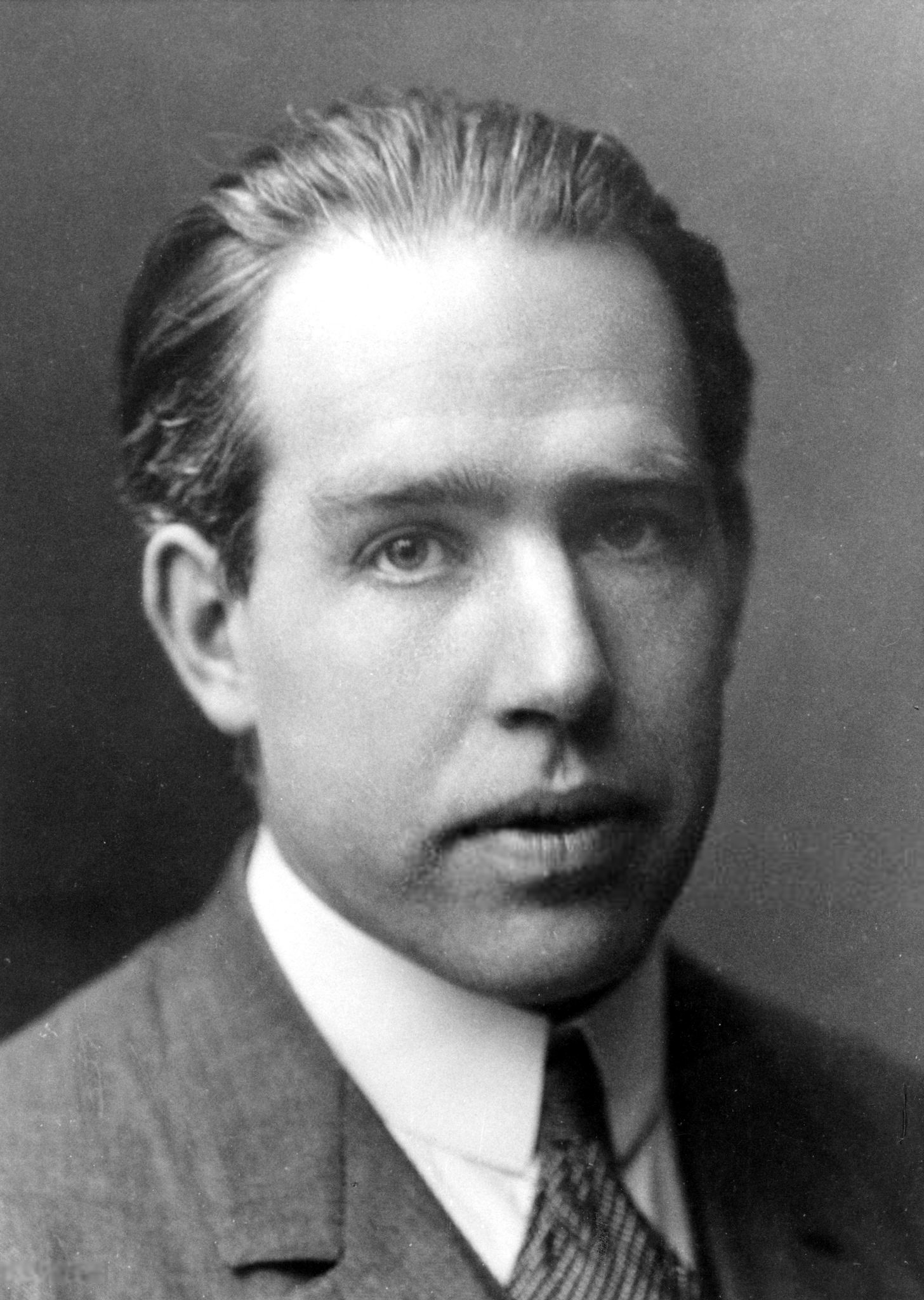
Niels Bohr

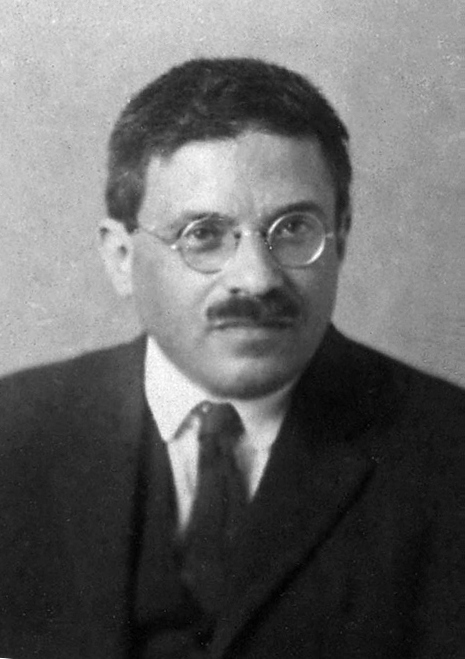
Paul Ehrenfest

Richard Feynman

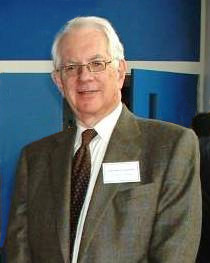
Sheldon Glashow

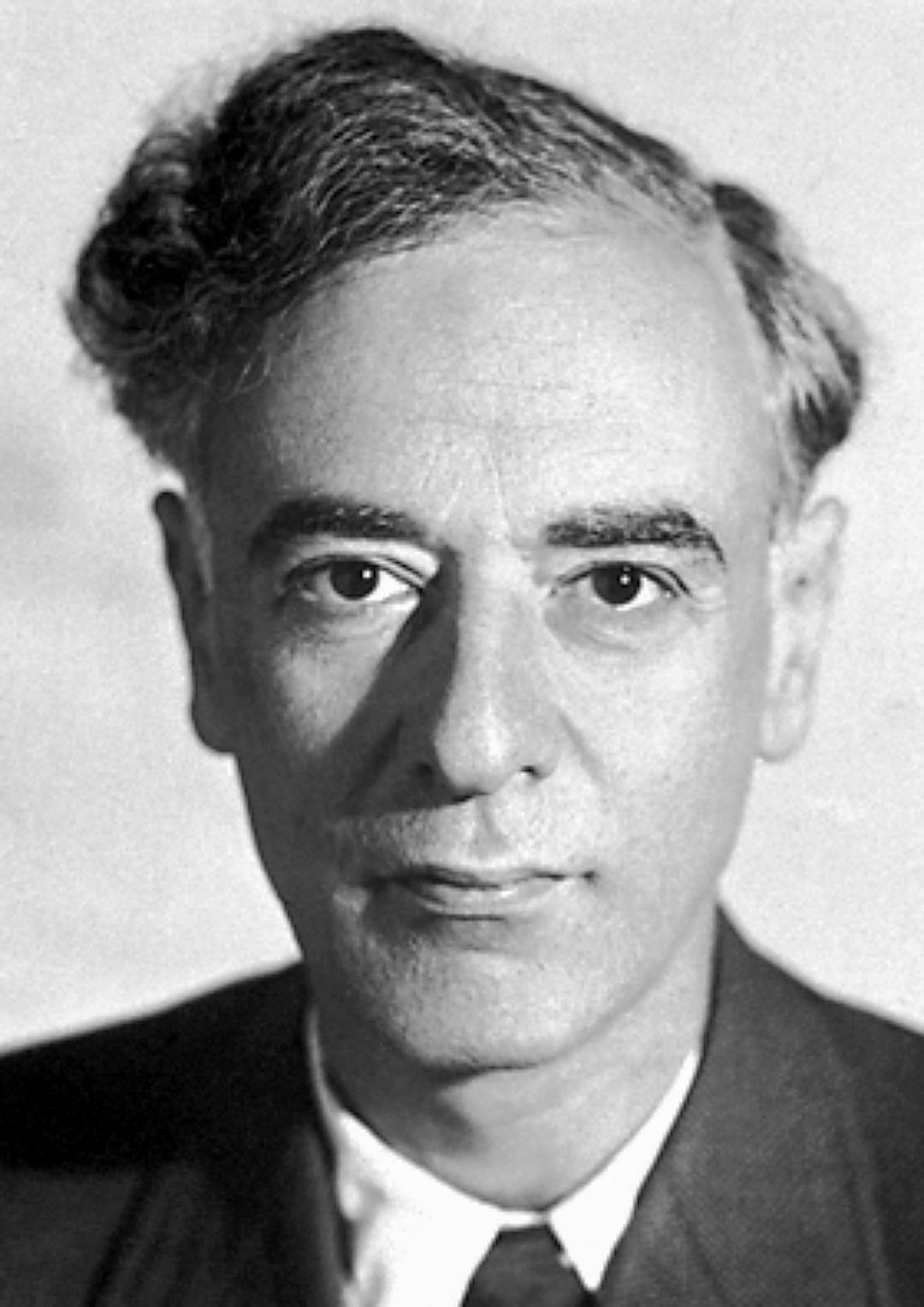
Lev Landau

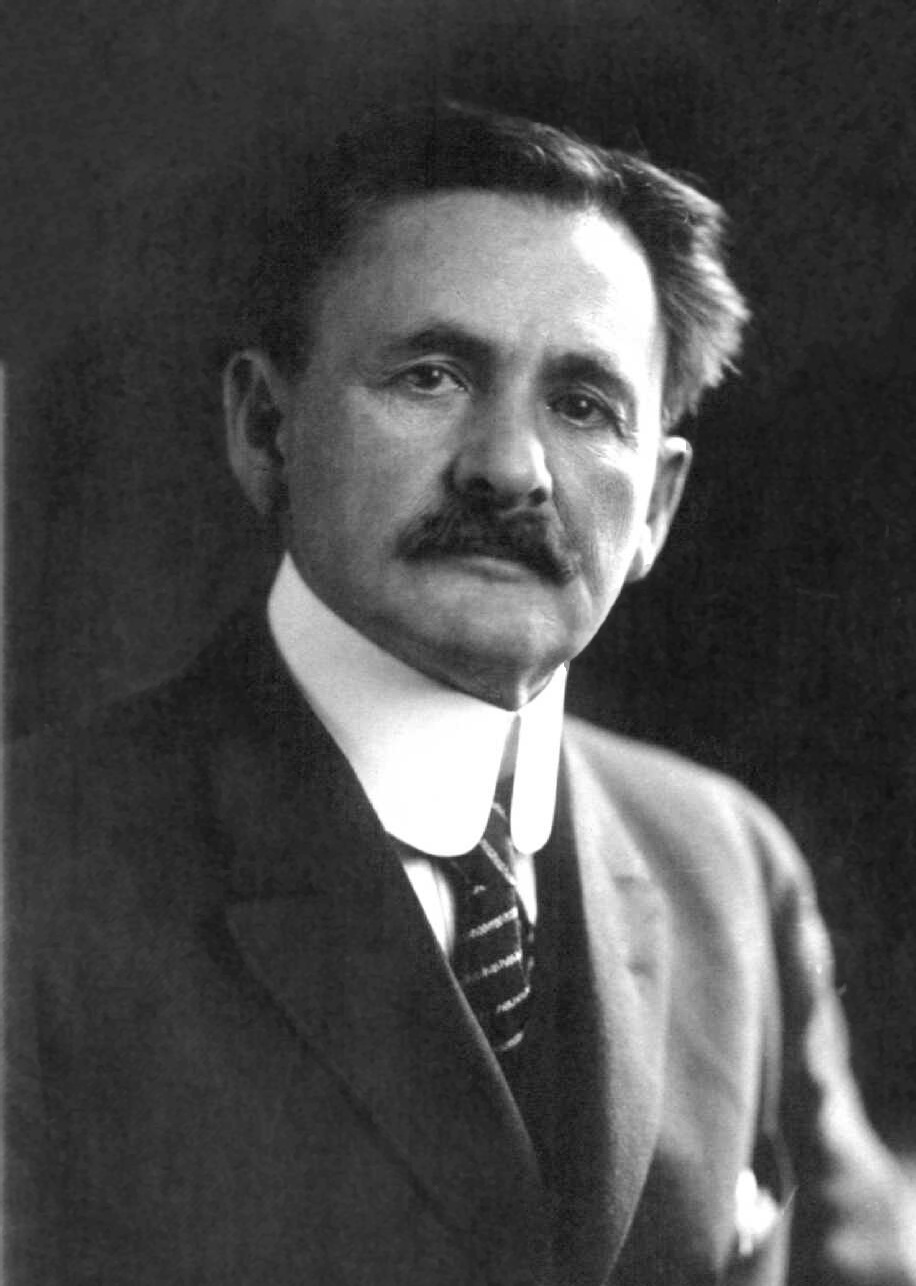
Albert A. Michelson

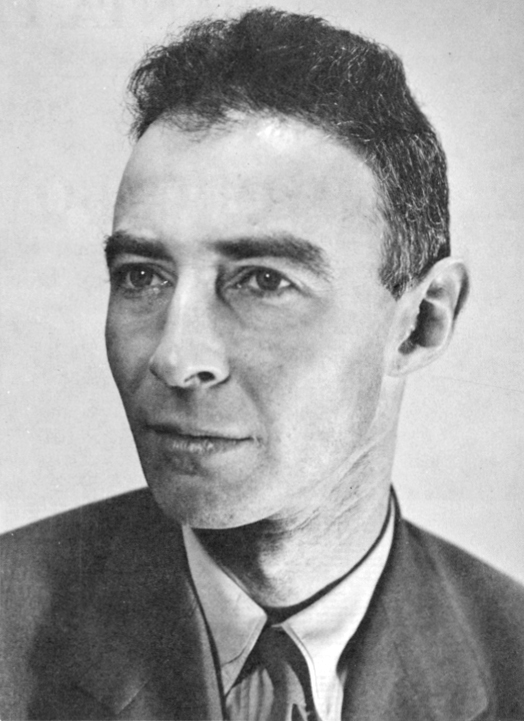
J. Robert Oppenheimer

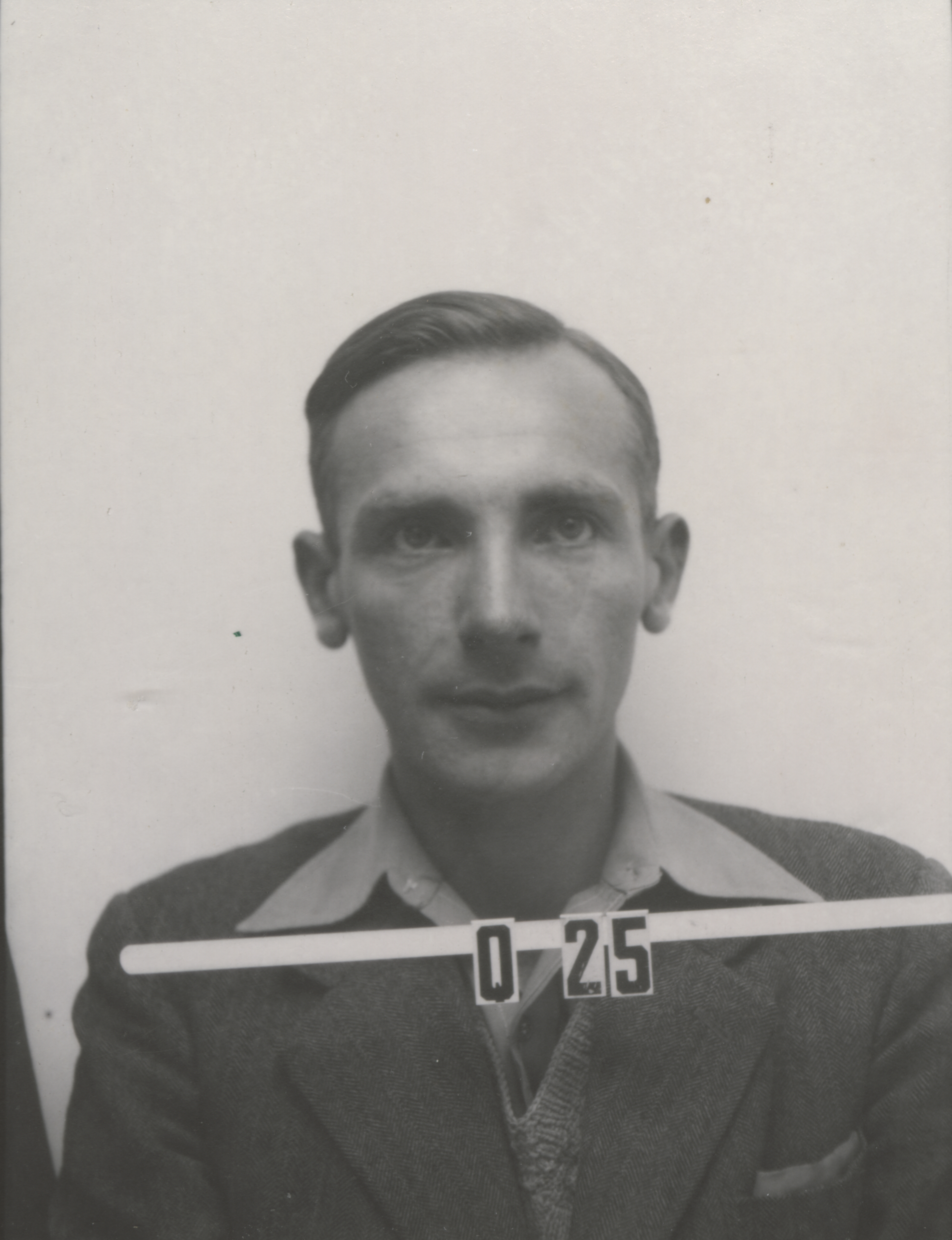
Joseph Rotblat

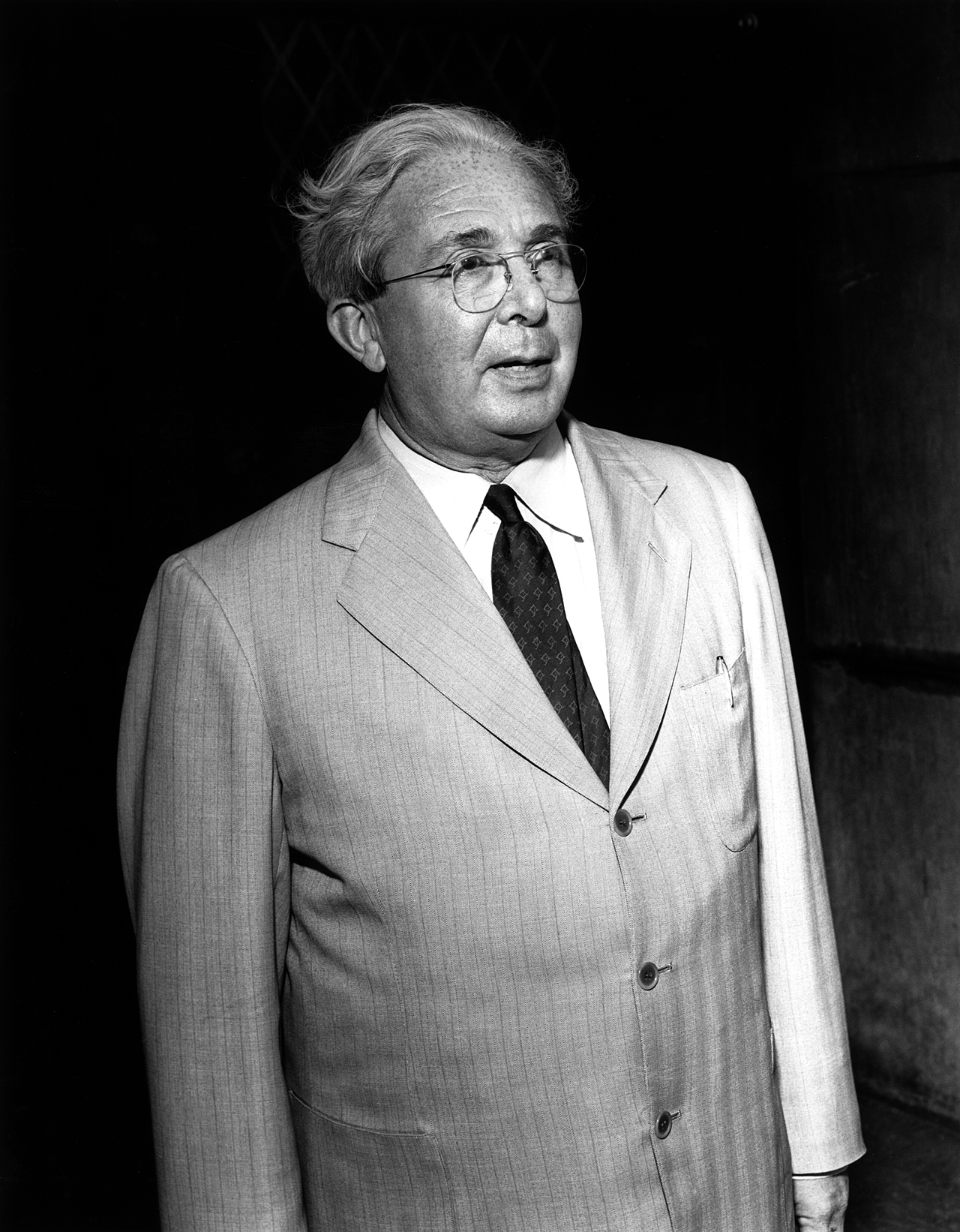
Leo Szilard

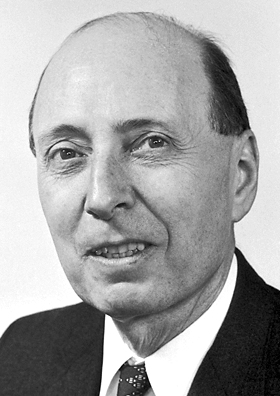
Eugene Wigner

- Zhores Alferov* – Soviet and Russian physicist and academic who contributed significantly to the creation of modern heterostructure physics and electronics; inventor of the heterotransistor; winner of 2000 Nobel Prize in Physics
- Hans Bethe* – German-American nuclear physicist; Nobel laureate in physics for his work on the theory of stellar nucleosynthesis; versatile theoretical physicist; made important contributions to quantum electrodynamics, nuclear physics, solid-state physics and astrophysics; during World War II, he was head of the Theoretical Division at the secret Los Alamos laboratory which developed the first atomic bombs; there he played a key role in calculating the critical mass of the weapons, and did theoretical work on the implosion method used in both the Trinity test and the "Fat Man" weapon dropped on Nagasaki, Japan
- David Bohm (agnostic) – American-born British quantum physicist who contributed to theoretical physics, philosophy of mind, and neuropsychology
- Niels Bohr* (1885–1962) – Danish physicist; known for his foundational contributions to understanding atomic structure and quantum mechanics, for which he received the Nobel Prize in Physics in 1922
- David Deutsch – Israeli-British physicist at the University of Oxford; pioneered the field of quantum computation by being the first person to formulate a description for a quantum Turing machine, as well as specifying an algorithm designed to run on a quantum computer
- Paul Ehrenfest (1880–1933) – Austrian-Dutch physicist; made major contributions to the field of statistical mechanics and its relations with quantum mechanics
- Albert Einstein (1879–1955) – German theoretical physicist; best known for developing the theory of relativity. He received the 1921 Nobel Prize in Physics. Although his religious views are subject of debate among scholars, he called himself an agnostic several times.
- Richard Feynman* (positive atheist) – American theoretical physicist known for his work in the path integral formulation of quantum mechanics, the theory of quantum electrodynamics, and the physics of the superfluidity of supercooled liquid helium, as well as in particle physics, Nobel Prize in Physics
- James Franck* – German physicist; won the Nobel Prize in Physics in 1925
- Jerome Isaac Friedman* (agnostic) – American physicist; in 1968–1969, commuting between MIT and California, he conducted experiments with Henry W. Kendall and Richard E. Taylor at the Stanford Linear Accelerator Center which gave the first experimental evidence that protons had an internal structure, later known to be quarks; for this, they shared the 1990 Nobel Prize in Physics; Institute Professor at the Massachusetts Institute of Technology; member of the Board of Sponsors of the Bulletin of the Atomic Scientists
- Murray Gell-Mann* (agnostic) – American physicist and linguist who received the 1969 Nobel Prize in Physics for his work on the theory of elementary particles
- Vitaly Ginzburg* – Soviet theoretical physicist; astrophysicist; member of the Russian Academy of Science; a father of the Soviet hydrogen bomb; Nobel Prize in Physics
- Sheldon Glashow* (1932–) – American theoretical physicist. He shared the 1979 Nobel Prize in Physics with Steven Weinberg and Abdus Salam for his contribution to the electroweak unification theory.
- Roy J. Glauber* (agnostic) – American theoretical physicist; awarded half of the 2005 Nobel Prize in Physics "for his contribution to the quantum theory of optical coherence", with the other half shared by John L. Hall and Theodor W. Hänsch
- David Gross* (agnostic) – American particle physicist and string theorist; with Frank Wilczek and David Politzer, was awarded the 2004 Nobel Prize in Physics for their discovery of asymptotic freedom
- Alan Guth – American theoretical physicist and cosmologist
- Lawrence Krauss (1954–) – professor of physics at Arizona State University; popularizer of science; speaks regularly at atheist conferences like Beyond Belief and Atheist Alliance International
- Lev Landau* – Soviet physicist; received the 1962 Nobel Prize in Physics for his development of a mathematical theory of superfluidity
- Leon M. Lederman* – American physicist; with Melvin Schwartz and Jack Steinberger, received the Nobel Prize in Physics in 1988 for their joint research on neutrinos
- Albert A. Michelson* (agnostic) – American physicist known for his work on the measurement of the speed of light and especially for the Michelson–Morley experiment; in 1907 he received the Nobel Prize in Physics
- Yuval Ne'eman (1925–2006) – Israeli theoretical physicist, military scientist, and politician; one of his greatest achievements in physics was his 1961 discovery of the classification of hadrons through the SU(3) flavour symmetry, now named the eightfold way, which was also proposed independently by Murray Gell-Mann
- Frank Oppenheimer (1912–1985) – American particle physicist; professor of physics at the University of Colorado; founder of the Exploratorium in San Francisco; a younger brother of renowned physicist J. Robert Oppenheimer, Frank conducted research on aspects of nuclear physics during the time of the Manhattan Project, and made contributions to uranium enrichment
- J. Robert Oppenheimer (1904–1967) – American theoretical physicist and professor of physics at the University of California, Berkeley; along with Enrico Fermi, he is often called the "father of the atomic bomb" for his role in the Manhattan Project
- Saul Perlmutter* (agnostic) – American astrophysicist; shared both the 2006 Shaw Prize in Astronomy and the 2011 Nobel Prize in Physics with Brian P. Schmidt and Adam Riess for providing evidence that the expansion of the universe is accelerating
- Marshall Rosenbluth – American physicist, nicknamed "the Pope of Plasma Physics"; created the Metropolis algorithm in statistical mechanics, derived the Rosenbluth formula in high-energy physics, and laid the foundations for instability theory in plasma physics
- Joseph Rotblat* (agnostic) – Polish-British physicist; along with the Pugwash Conferences on Science and World Affairs, he received the Nobel Peace Prize in 1995
- Dennis W. Sciama British physicist who played a major role in developing British physics after the Second World War. His most significant work was in general relativity, with and without quantum theory, and black holes. He helped revitalize the classical relativistic alternative to general relativity known as Einstein–Cartan gravity. He is considered one of the fathers of modern cosmology.
- Ethan Siegel* (atheist) – American theoretical astrophysicist and science writer, who studies the Big Bang theory. In the past he has been a professor at Lewis & Clark College and a blogger at Starts With a Bang, on ScienceBlogs and also on Forbes.com since 2016.
- Lee Smolin – American theoretical physicist; researcher at the Perimeter Institute for Theoretical Physics; adjunct professor of physics at the University of Waterloo
- Jack Steinberger* (atheist/humanist) – German-American-Swiss physicist; co-discovered the muon neutrino, along with Leon Lederman and Melvin Schwartz, for which they were given the 1988 Nobel Prize in Physics
- Leo Szilard (agnostic) – Austro-Hungarian physicist and inventor
- Edward Teller (agnostic) – Hungarian-American theoretical physicist, known colloquially as "the father of the hydrogen bomb"; made numerous contributions to nuclear and molecular physics, spectroscopy (the Jahn–Teller and Renner–Teller effects), and surface physics
- Joseph Weber – American physicist; gave the earliest public lecture on the principles behind the laser and the maser; developed the first gravitational wave detectors (Weber bars)
- Steven Weinberg* – American theoretical physicist, unification of the weak force and electromagnetic interaction between elementary particles, share of the Nobel Prize in Physics
- Victor Weisskopf – Austrian-born American theoretical physicist
- Eugene Wigner* – Hungarian American theoretical physicist and mathematician; with Maria Goeppert Mayer and J. Hans D. Jensen, received a share of the Nobel Prize in Physics in 1963 "for his contributions to the theory of the atomic nucleus and the elementary particles, particularly through the discovery and application of fundamental symmetry principles"; laid the foundation for the theory of symmetries in quantum mechanics; researched the structure of the atomic nucleus; first identified Xenon-135 "poisoning" in nuclear reactors (sometimes referred to as "Wigner poisoning"); important for his work in pure mathematics, having authored a number of theorems
- Yakov Zeldovich – Soviet physicist born in Belarus; played an important role in the development of Soviet nuclear and thermonuclear weapons; made important contributions to the fields of adsorption and catalysis, shock waves, nuclear physics, particle physics, astrophysics, physical cosmology, and general relativity

== Public figures ==
Nobel laureates are marked with an asterisk (*).

=== Activism ===
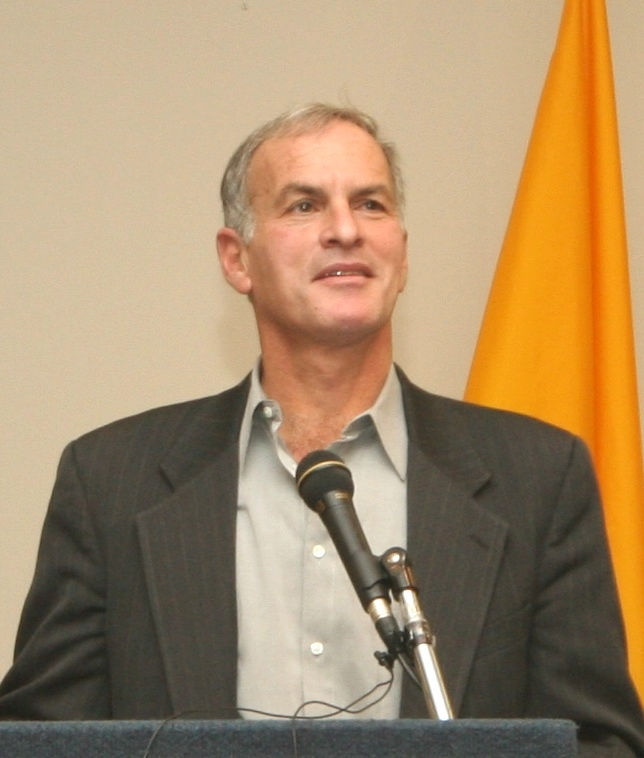
Norman Finkelstein

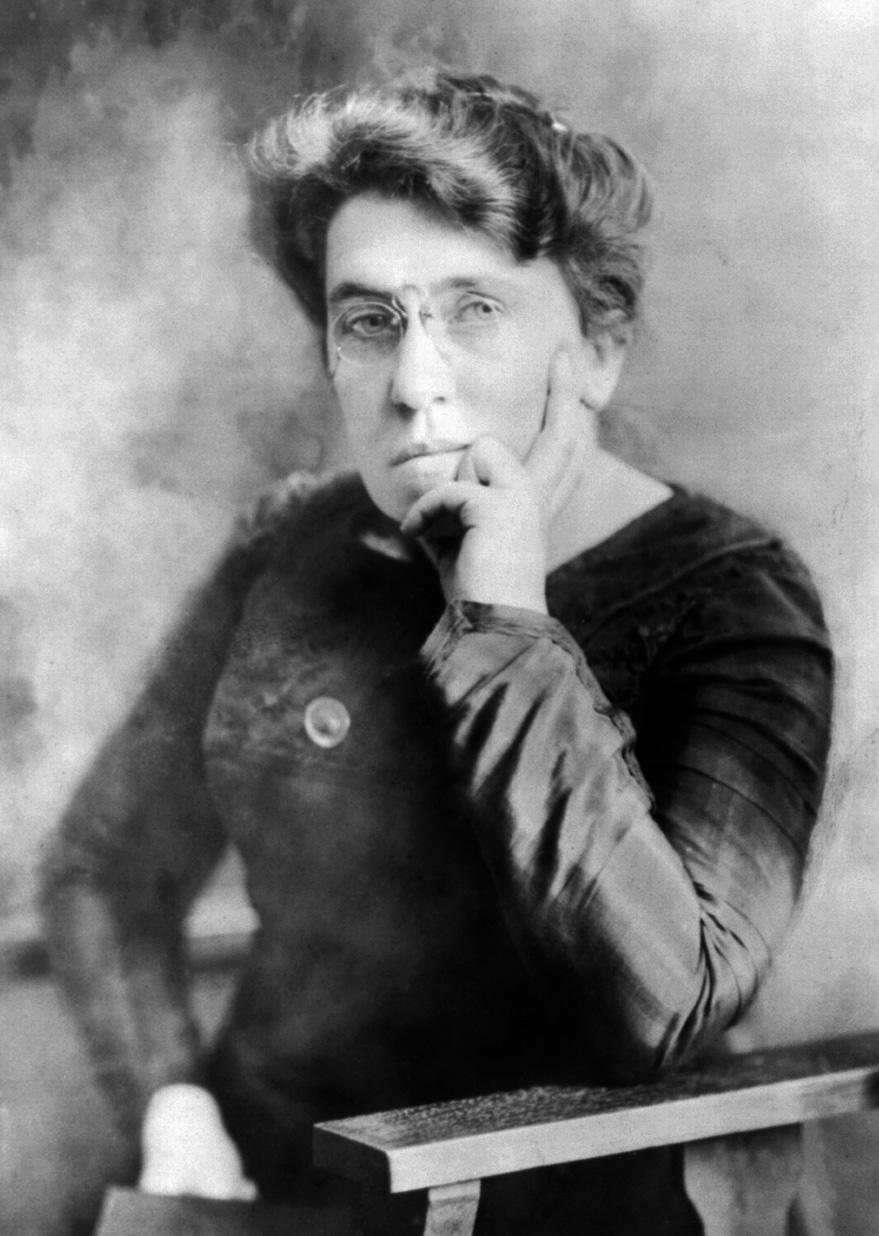
Emma Goldman

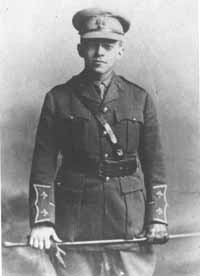
Ze'ev Jabotinsky

- Saul Alinsky (agnostic) – American community organizer and writer; noted for the book Rules for Radicals
- Hannah Arendt (agnostic) – German-American writer and political theorist
- Alexander Berkman – anarchist known for his political activism and writing; a leading member of the anarchist movement in the early 20th century; while living in France, he continued his work in support of the anarchist movement, producing the classic exposition of anarchist principles, Now and After: The ABC of Communist Anarchism
- Yaron Brook – political activist, current president and executive director of the Ayn Rand Institute
- Ariel Dorfman (agnostic) – Argentine-Chilean novelist, playwright, essayist, academic, and human rights activist
- Norman Finkelstein – American political scientist, activist and author whose primary fields of research are the Israeli–Palestinian conflict and the politics of the Holocaust
- Betty Friedan (agnostic) – American writer, activist and feminist; a leading figure in the Women's Movement in the United States; her 1963 book The Feminine Mystique is often credited with sparking the "second wave" of American feminism in the 20th century
- Emma Goldman – anarchist known for her political activism, writing, and speeches
- Nadine Gordimer* – South African political activist, writer; active in the anti-apartheid movement; Nobel Prize in Literature
- Abbie Hoffman (1936–1989) – American political and social activist
- Ze'ev Jabotinsky (1880–1940) (Agnostic) – Revisionist Zionist (nationalist) leader, author, orator, activist, soldier, and founder of the Jewish Self-Defense Organization in Odessa
- Adam Kokesh – American libertarian anti-war activist and self-professed anarcho-capitalist
- Henry Morgentaler – Canadian physician and prominent pro-choice advocate who has fought numerous legal battles for that cause
- Rosika Schwimmer – Hungarian-born pacifist, feminist, female suffragist
- Joe Slovo (1926–1995) – South African Anti-Apartheid activist, General Secretary of the South African Communist Party from 1984 to 1991, Commander of uMkhonto we Sizwe, Later served as Minister of Housing of South Africa from 1994 until his death. Described himself as an atheist who retained respect for "the positive aspects of Jewish culture".
- Maxim Katz – Russian political opposition figure, urban planning activist, election campaign strategist, and popular YouTuber hosting his own daily political show

=== Entrepreneurs ===
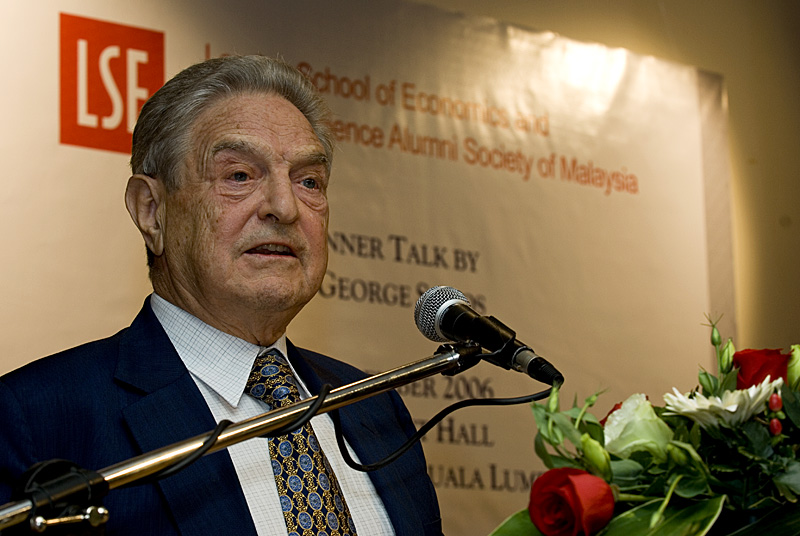
George Soros

- George Soros – billionaire investor
- Michael Steinhardt – American hedge fund manager, investor, and philanthropist active in Jewish causes

=== Explorers ===
- Ármin Vámbéry – Hungarian Turkolog and traveler

=== Military ===
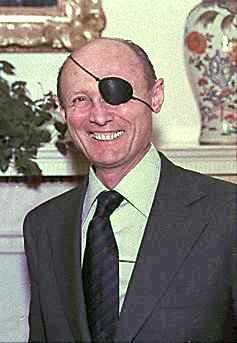
Moshe Dayan

- Moshe Dayan – Israeli military leader and politician; fourth Chief of Staff of the Israel Defense Forces (1953–58); became Defense Minister and later Foreign Minister of Israel
- Leon Trotsky – Russian Marxist revolutionary and theorist, Soviet politician, founder and first leader of the Red Army

=== Politics ===
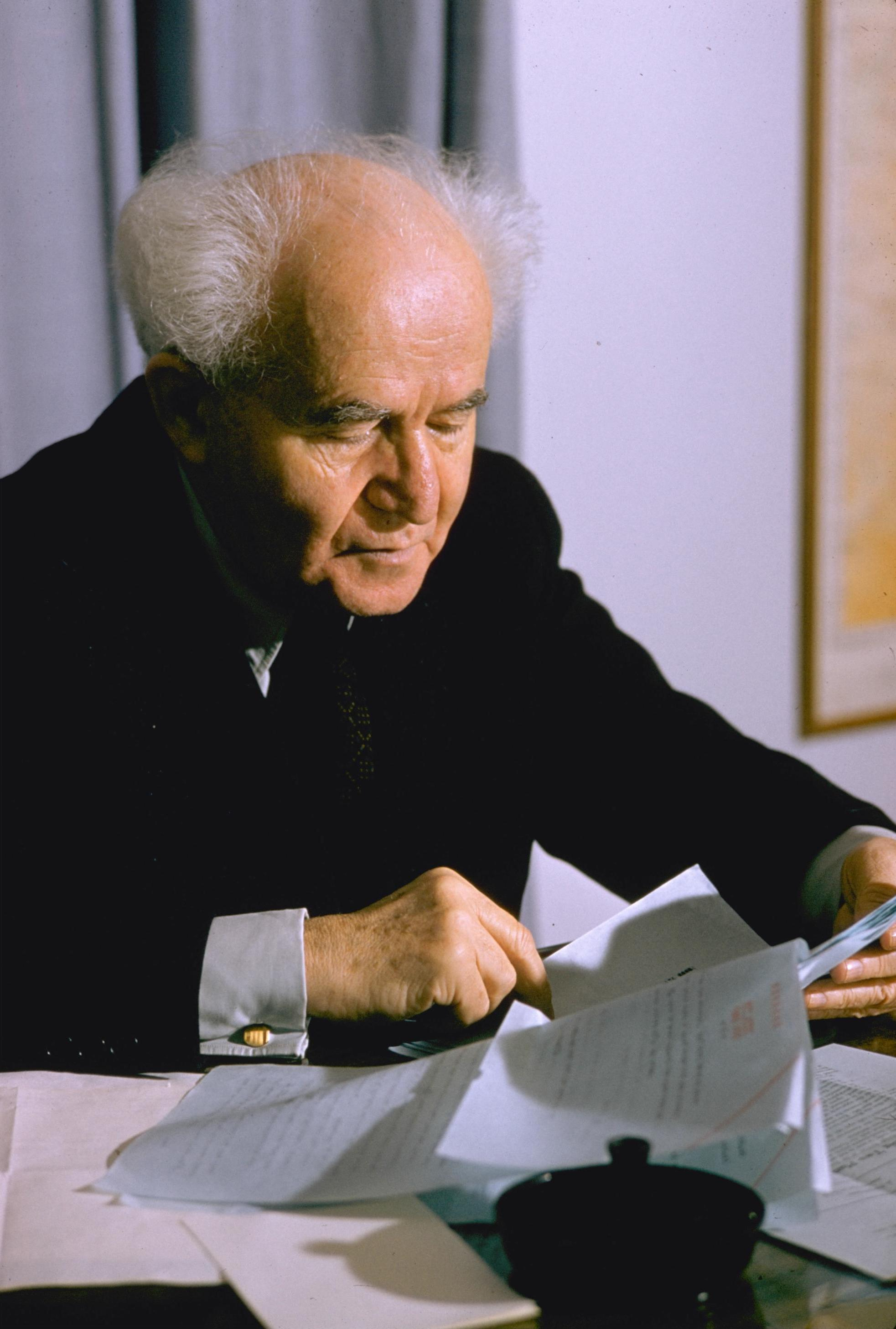
David Ben-Gurion

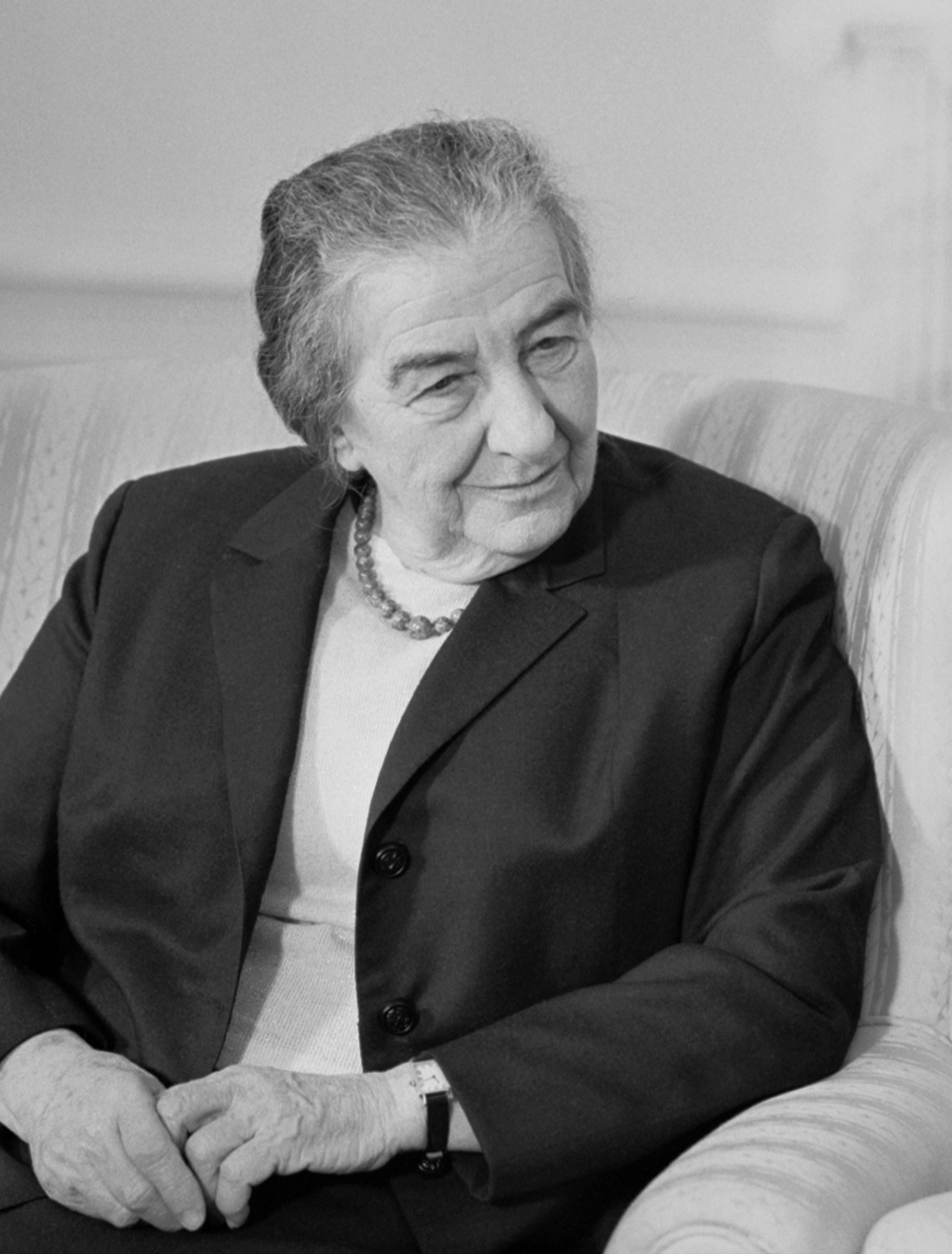
Golda Meir

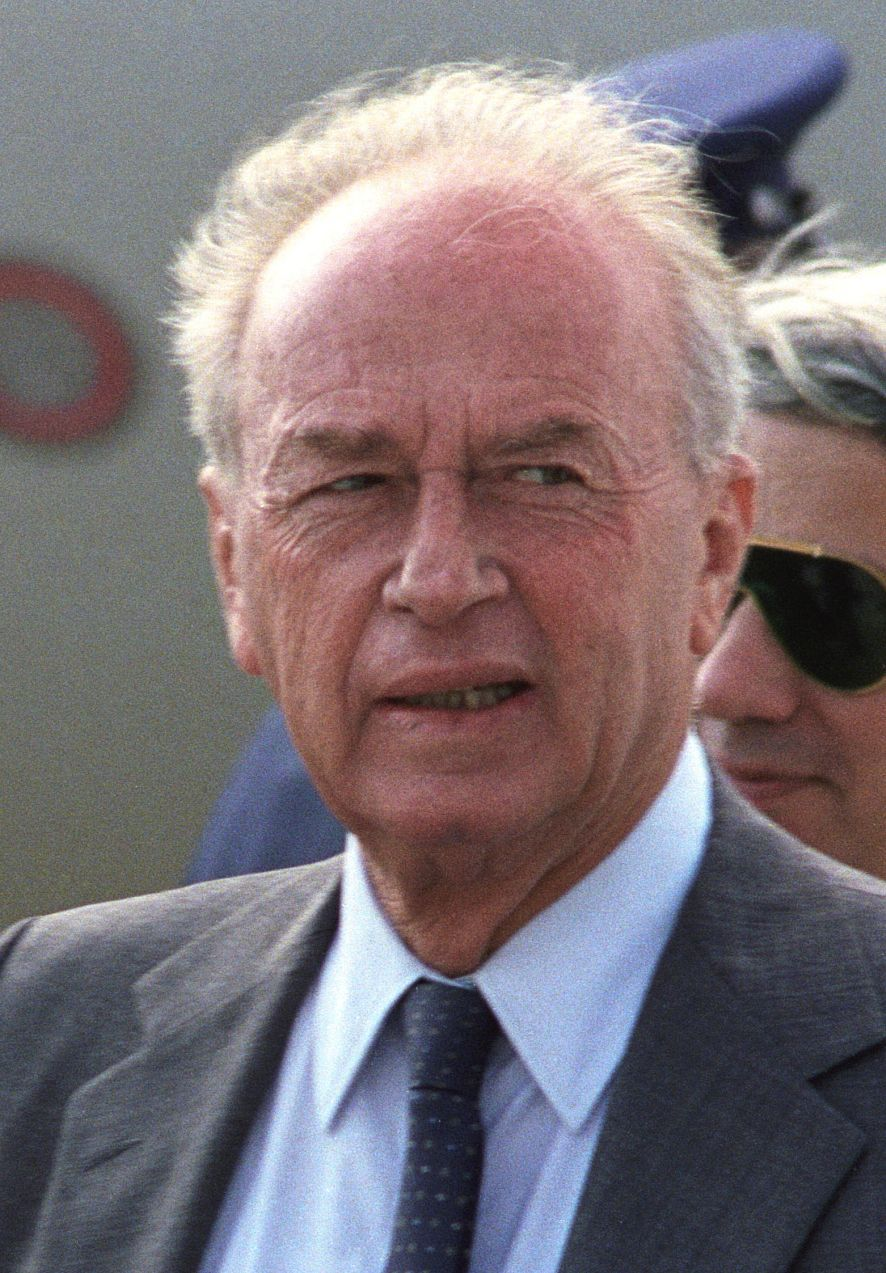
Yitzhak Rabin

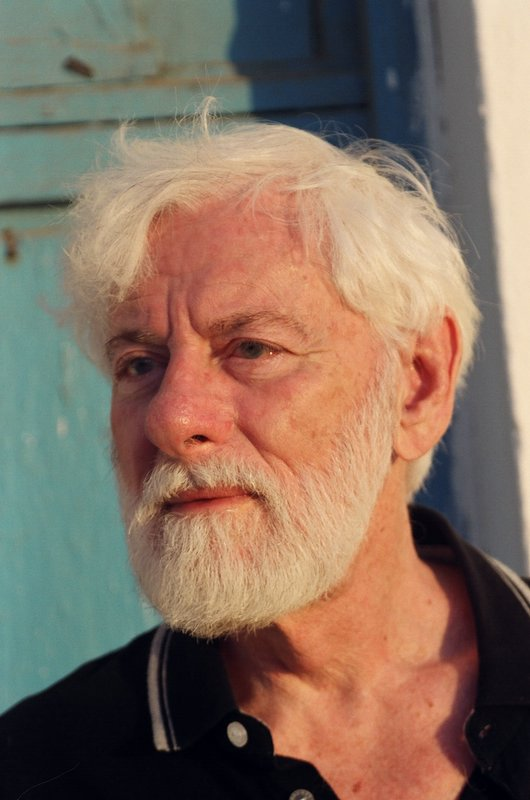
Uri Avnery

- Shulamit Aloni – Israeli politician and left-wing activist
- Uri Avnery – Israeli journalist, left-wing peace activist, and former Knesset member
- David Ben-Gurion – Polish-Israeli politician; a founder and the first Prime Minister of modern Israel
- Jorge Sampaio – Agnostic. Served as the 18th President of Portugal, from 1996 to 2006
- Job Cohen – Dutch social democratic politician and former legal scholar
- Janet Jagan – American-born socialist politician who was President of Guyana
- Béla Kun – Hungarian revolutionary who led the Hungarian Soviet Republic in 1919
- Myriam Bregman – Argentine lawyer, activist and politician.
- Mátyás Rákosi – Hungarian Communist Politician involved with the Hungarian Soviet Republic and later led the Hungarian People's Republic as General Secretary of the Hungarian Working People's Party from 1948 to 1956.
- Golda Meir – Israeli teacher, kibbutznik, fourth Prime Minister of Israel, Yom Kippur War
- David Miliband – former British Labour Party politician; Member of Parliament from 2001 to 2013; Secretary of State for Foreign and Commonwealth Affairs from 2007 to 2010; older brother of Ed and son of Ralph Miliband (see Sociology section )
- Ed Miliband – British politician and former leader of the Labour Party; younger brother of David and son of Ralph Miliband
- Yitzhak Rabin* – Israeli politician, statesman and general; fifth Prime Minister of Israel; won the 1994 Nobel Peace Prize with Shimon Peres and Yasser Arafat
- Dove-Myer Robinson – mayor of Auckland City, New Zealand 1959–1965, 1968–1980
- Sam Seder – American talk show host, host of The Majority Report and co-host of Ring of Fire
- Einat Wilf – Israeli former member of the Knesset for the Labor Party.
- Lev Shlosberg (irreligious) – Russian opposition politician, human-rights activist, journalist, historian who is currently serving an 11 years and 1 month sentence for voicing opposition to the Russian full-scale invasion of Ukraine

=== Public atheists ===
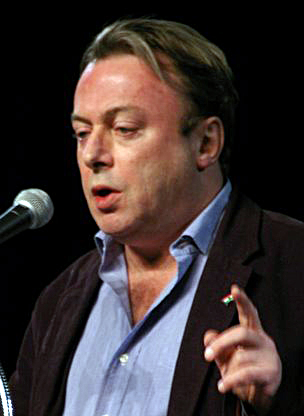
Christopher Hitchens

- Chapman Cohen – leading English atheist, secularist writer and lecturer
- Sam Harris – American author, philosopher, public intellectual, neuroscientist, co-founder and CEO of Project Reason
- Christopher Hitchens – antitheist, author, journalist and orator
- Joseph Lewis, president of Freethinkers of America
- Michael Newdow – American attorney, best known for his efforts to have recitations of the current-version Pledge of Allegiance in public schools declared unconstitutional for the phrase "under God"
- David Silverman – former president of American Atheists, a nonprofit atheist rights advocacy organization

== Social sciences ==
=== Economics ===
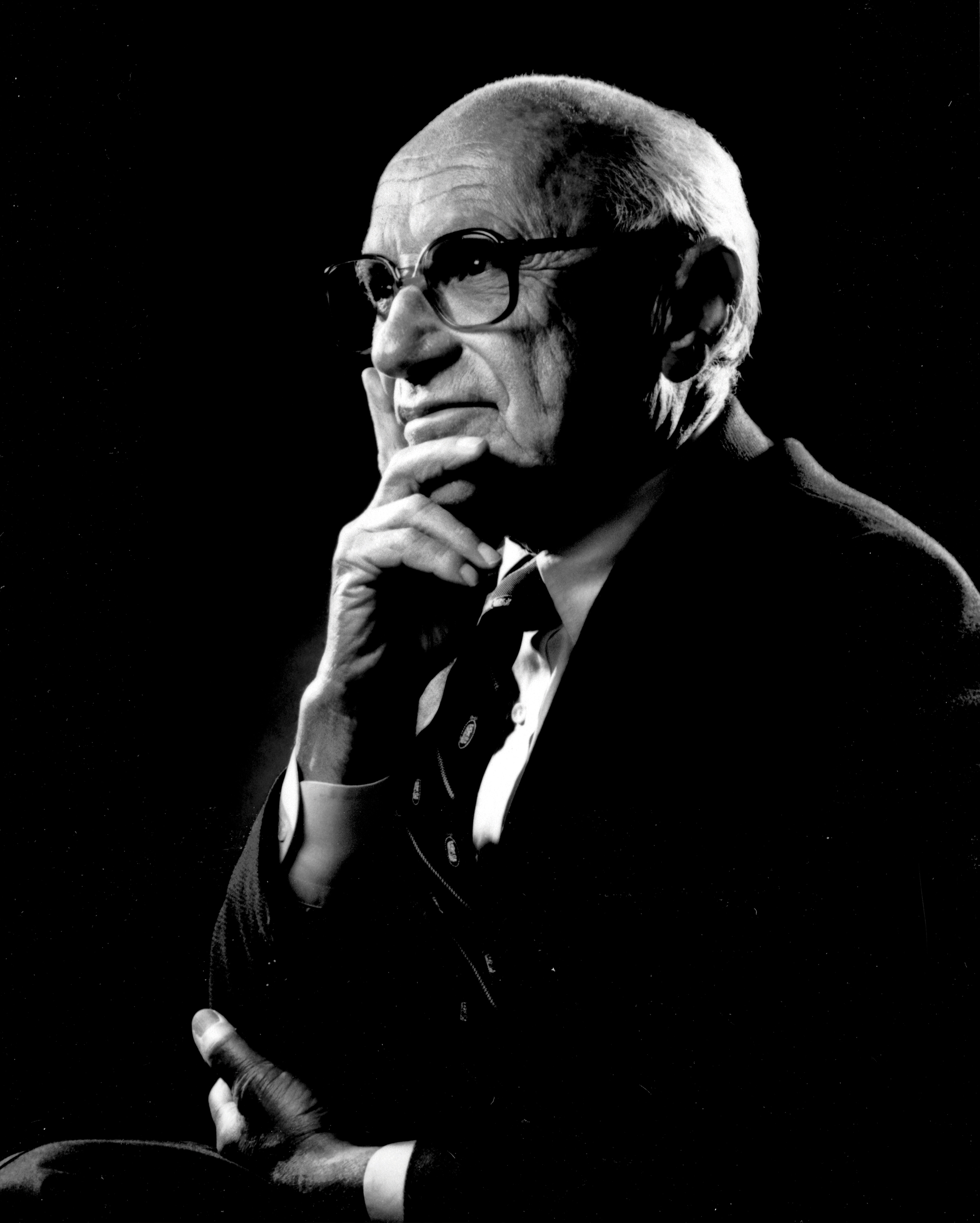
Milton Friedman

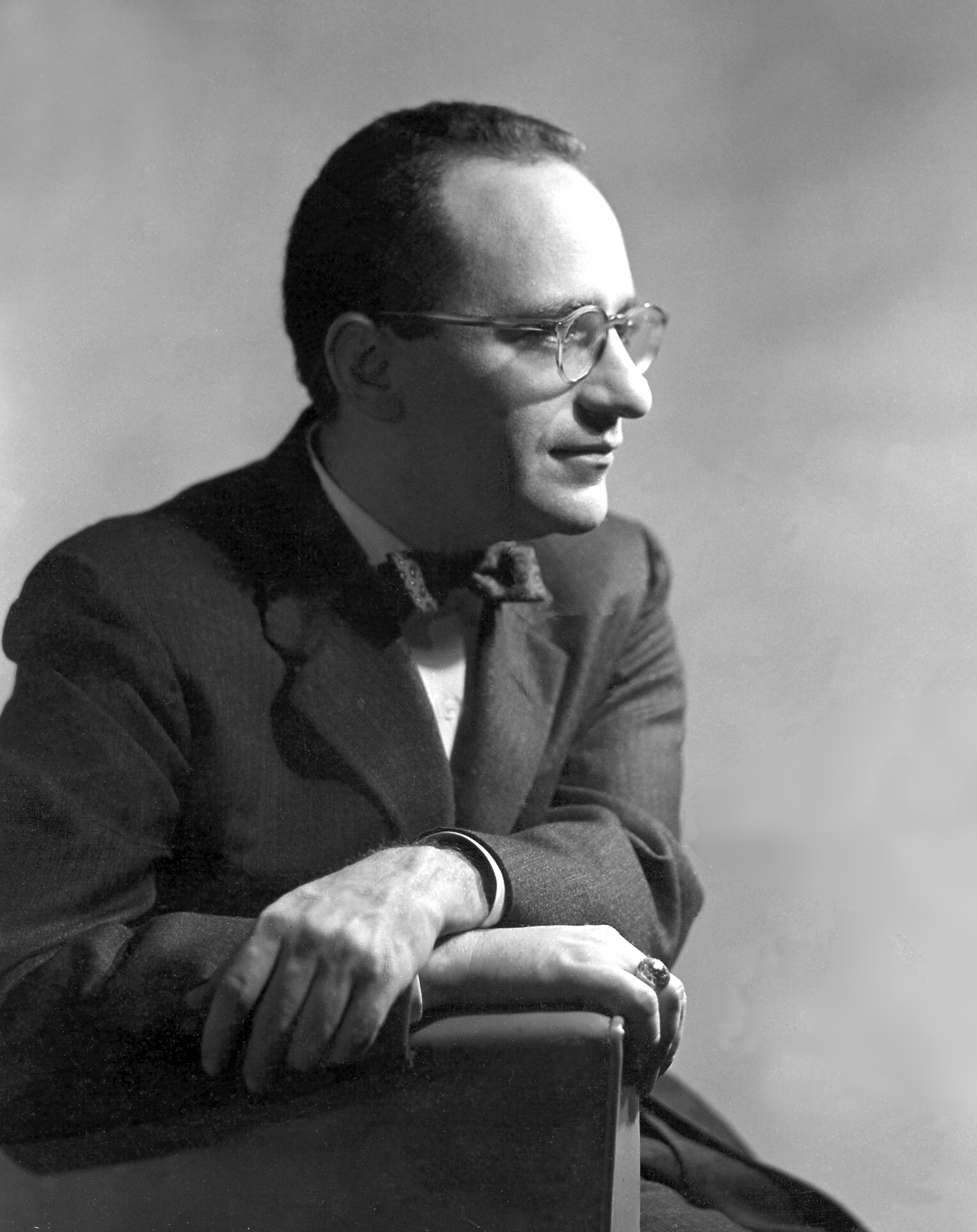
Murray Rothbard

Nobel laureates are marked with an asterisk (*).

- David D. Friedman – Chicago School economist, physicist, legal scholar, and libertarian theorist
- Milton Friedman* (agnostic) – American economist, statistician, author, economic adviser to President Ronald Reagan, founding member of Mont Pelerin Society, free market capitalist, University of Chicago, Chicago School of Economics, Nobel Prize in Economics
- John Harsanyi* – Hungarian-Australian-American economist and Nobel Memorial Prize in Economic Sciences winner
- Karl Marx (self-described atheist) – inventor of Marxist economics
- Ludwig von Mises (agnostic) – Austrian economist, philosopher, free market capitalist, classical liberal, Austrian School of Economics, founding member of Mont Pelerin Society
- Murray Rothbard (self-described atheist) – American economist, historian, political theorist, founder of anarcho-capitalism
- Herbert A. Simon* (1916–2001) – American political scientist, economist, and computer scientist; one of the most influential social scientists of the 20th century; won the Turing Award in 1975 and the Nobel Prize in Economics in 1978
- Piero Sraffa (agnostic) – influential Italian economist whose book Production of Commodities by Means of Commodities is taken as founding the Neo-Ricardian school of Economics
- Joseph Stiglitz* – American economist and Nobel Memorial Prize in Economic Sciences winner

=== Futurist ===
- Robert Ettinger – American academic, known as "the father of cryonics" because of the impact of his 1962 book The Prospect of Immortality
- Herman Kahn – American futurist, military strategist and systems theorist; known for analyzing the likely consequences of nuclear war and recommending ways to improve survivability, a notoriety that made him an inspiration for the title character of Stanley Kubrick's classic black comedy film satire Dr. Strangelove
- Ray Kurzweil (agnostic) – American author, inventor, futurist, and director of engineering at Google

=== Journalism ===
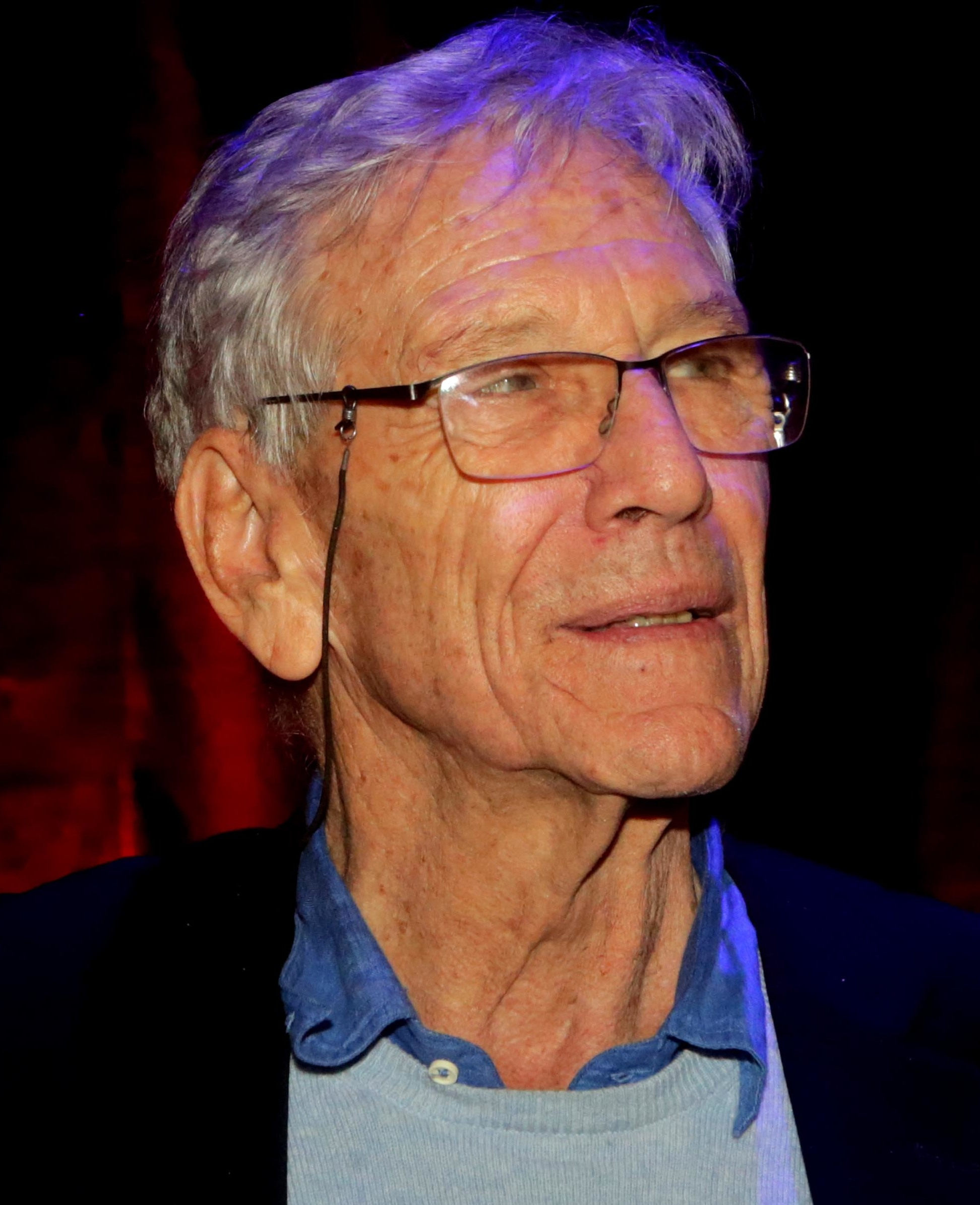
Amos Oz

- Isaac Deutscher – Polish-born Jewish Marxist writer, journalist and political activist best known as a biographer of Leon Trotsky and Joseph Stalin and as a commentator on Soviet affairs
- Anton Dolin – Russian film critic, journalist and radio host
- Amy Goodman – American journalist and host of Democracy Now!
- Glenn Greenwald – American journalist and author
- Amos Oz – Israeli writer, novelist, journalist, professor of literature at Ben-Gurion University in Beersheba
- Catherine Perez-Shakdam – French journalist, political analyst and commentator; formerly a marital convert to Islam
- Vladimir Pozner Jr. – French-born Russian-American journalist, presenter and restaurateur
- Alexei Venediktov – Russian journalist, former editor-in-chief, host and co-owner of the Echo of Moscow radio station

==== Columnists ====
- Amy Alkon (negative atheist) – writer of a weekly advice column, Ask the Advice Goddess, which is published in over 100 newspapers within North America
- Nat Hentoff – American syndicated columnist and music critic
- Ezra Klein (irreligious) – an American liberal political commentator and journalist

=== Psychology ===
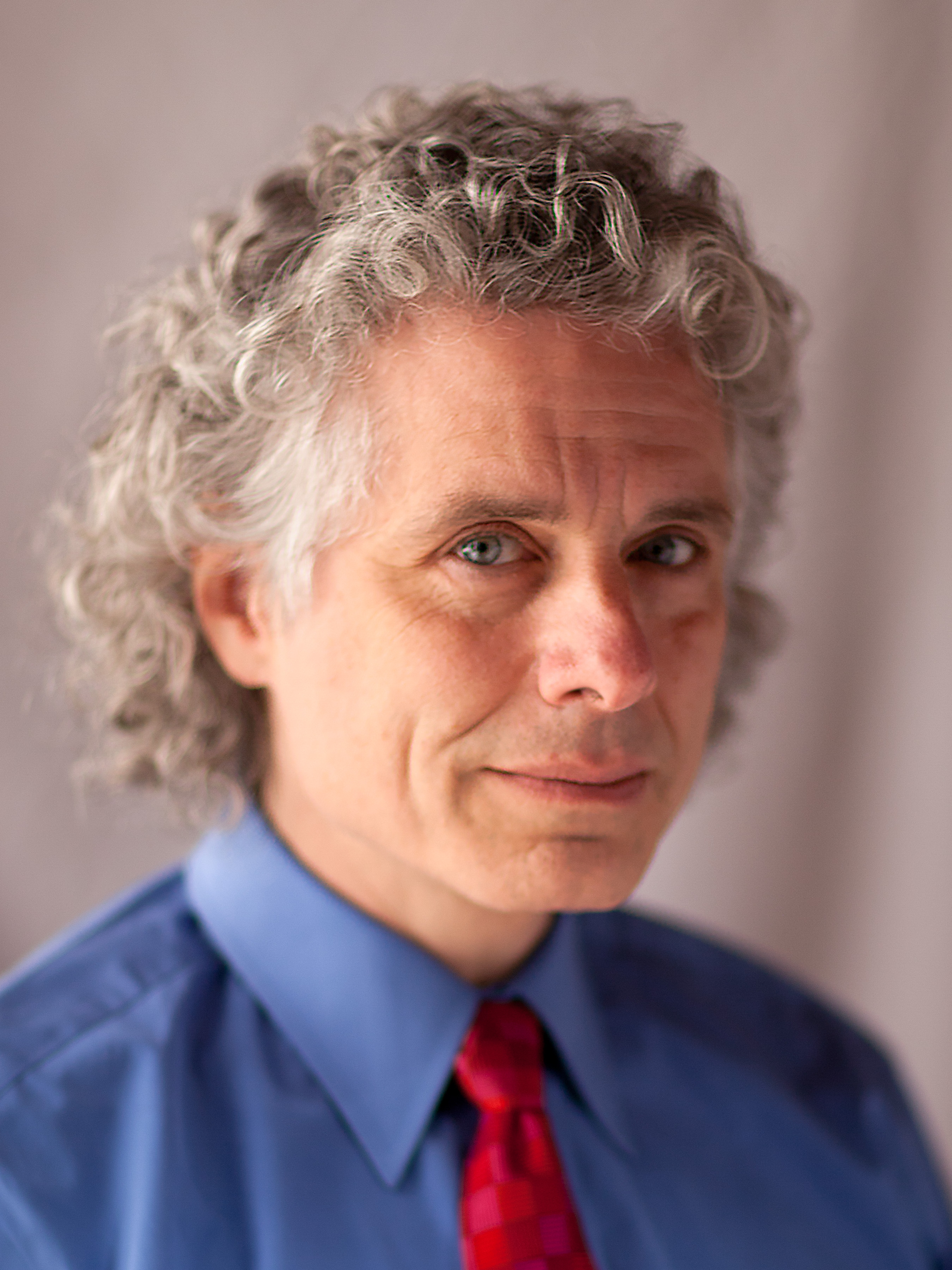
Steven Pinker

- Albert Ellis ("probabilistic atheist") – American psychologist who in 1955 developed Rational Emotive Behavior Therapy
- Jerry Fodor – American philosopher and cognitive scientist, Professor of Philosophy at Rutgers University, the modularity of mind and the language of thought hypotheses
- Sigmund Freud (antitheist) – Austrian neurologist, founding father of psychoanalysis (see also Freud and religion)
- Erich Fromm (1900–1980) – Jewish-German-American social psychologist, psychoanalyst, and humanistic philosopher, associated with the Frankfurt School of critical theory
- Steven Pinker – Canadian-American cognitive psychologist, psycholinguist and popular science author
- Gad Saad – Canadian marketing professor. Born in Lebanon. Taught at Concordia University.
- Edwin Shneidman (1918–2009) – American suicidologist and thanatologist
- Boris Sidis – American psychologist, physician, psychiatrist, and philosopher of education
- Carlo Strenger – Swiss-Israeli psychologist, philosopher, existential psychoanalyst, public intellectual, Tel Aviv University

=== Sociology ===
- Émile Durkheim (agnostic) – French sociologist
- Boris Kagarlitsky – Russian Marxist theoretician, sociologist and political dissident
- Claude Lévi-Strauss (1908–2009) – French anthropologist and ethnologist; has been called, along with James George Frazer, the "father of modern anthropology"
- Ralph Miliband – Belgian-born British sociologist known as a prominent Marxist thinker, father of David and Ed Miliband (see above)

== See also ==
- Apostasy in Judaism
- Heresy in Judaism
- Hiloni
- Humanistic Judaism
- Jewish atheism
- Jewish Buddhists
- Jewish culture
- Jewish secularism
- Lists of Jews
- Lists of atheists
- Secularism in Israel
