= Elizabeth K. Hartline =

American environmental activist

Elizabeth Kraus Hartline (September 17, 1909 – July 31, 2001) was an environmental activist who worked to preserve almost 40,000 acres in Maryland wildlands.

== Early life ==
Elizabeth Hartline was born in Newton, Massachusetts. She was the daughter of Charles A. Kraus, a notable American chemist, and Frederica Feitshans. Growing up, she lived in Worcester, Massachusetts and Providence, Rhode Island.

Hartline attended Pembroke College in Providence, Rhode Island. She earned her bachelor’s degree in biology in 1931 and her master’s degree in psychology in 1932. Hartline was a professor in Comparative Psychology at Bryn Mawr College from 1936 to 1938.

== Environmental activism work ==
Elizabeth Hartline started the Maryland Wildlands Committee in 1971. She stated that the Committee was "a statewide group devoted primarily to the preservation of wildlands within the state of Maryland. Our interest reaches out to lands of wilderness character throughout the United States." She worked to bring awareness to the value of wildlands, working to gain support from Maryland's governors and legislators. Her advocacy prompted a state senator to introduce a bill establishing designated state wilderness areas. In 1971, the bill became a law. Savage River State Forest was the first wildland in Maryland to be designated under this law in 1973.

She co-chaired the Maryland Wildlands Committee with Alice Eastman beginning in 1988. Together the two environmental advocates organized grass-root campaigns to preserve state parks from development, logging, and mining. Governor Parris Glendening agreed to allocate 37,000 acres as designated wildlands in 1996.

Hartline preserved many Maryland wildlands during her thirty years of environmental work, including the Pocomoke River Swamp, mountains in Garrett County, and coastal plains on the Eastern shore. 1,100 acres of land in Hereford, Maryland by the Gunpowder River was renamed in 1996 to Hartline-Eastman Wildland, after Hartline and her fellow advocate Alice Eastman in honor of their work to preserve the land.

== Personal life ==
Hartline married Haldan Keffer Hartline in 1936. They had three children.

She died of heart failure at age 91 at a hospital in Beverly, Massachusetts.
