= Haldan Keffer Hartline =

American physiologist (1903–1983)

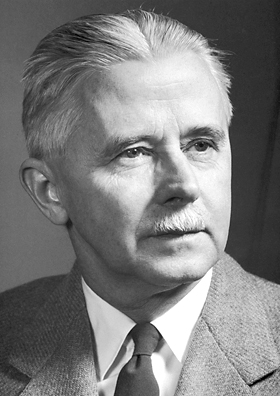
- Haldan Keffer Hartline, c. 1958
- Born: December 22, 1903; Bloomsburg, Pennsylvania, US
- Died: March 17, 1983 (aged 79); Fallston, Maryland, US
- Education: Lafayette College; Johns Hopkins School of Medicine
- Known for: Visual perception
- Awards: ForMemRS (1966); Nobel Prize in Physiology or Medicine (1967)
- Scientific career
- Fields: Physiology
- Workplaces: University of Pennsylvania; Cornell University; Rockefeller University; Johns Hopkins School of Medicine
- Doctoral advisor: August Herman Pfund

Haldan Keffer Hartline ForMemRS (December 22, 1903 – March 17, 1983) was an American physiologist who was a co-recipient (with George Wald and Ragnar Granit) of the 1967 Nobel Prize in Physiology or Medicine for his work in analyzing the neurophysiological mechanisms of vision.

== Biography ==
Haldan Hartline did his undergraduate studies at Lafayette College in Easton, Pennsylvania, graduating in 1923. He began his study of retinal electrophysiology as a National Research Council Fellow at Johns Hopkins School of Medicine, receiving his medical degree in 1927.

== Scientific career ==
After attending Leipzig University and the Ludwig-Maximilians-Universität München as an Eldridge Johnson traveling research scholar from the University of Pennsylvania, he returned to the US to take a position in the Eldridge Reeves Johnson Foundation for Medical Physics at Penn, which was under the directorship of Detlev W. Bronk at that time. In 1940–1941, he was Associate Professor of Physiology at Cornell Medical College in New York City but returned to Penn and stayed until 1949. Then he became professor of biophysics and chairman of the Jenkins Department of Biophysics at Johns Hopkins University in 1949. One of Hartline's graduate students at Johns Hopkins, Paul Greengard, also won the Nobel Prize. Hartline joined the staff of Rockefeller University, New York City, in 1953 as professor of neurophysiology.

Hartline investigated the electrical responses of the retinas of certain arthropods, vertebrates, and mollusks, because their visual systems are much simpler than those of humans and thus easier to study. He concentrated his studies on the eye of the horseshoe crab (Limulus polyphemus). Using minute electrodes, he obtained the first record of the electrical impulses sent by a single optic nerve fibre when the receptors connected to it are stimulated by light. He found that the photoreceptor cells in the eye are interconnected in such a way that when one is stimulated, others nearby are depressed, thus enhancing the contrast in light patterns and sharpening the perception of shapes. Hartline thus built up a detailed understanding of the workings of individual photoreceptors and nerve fibres in the retina, and he showed how simple retinal mechanisms constitute vital steps in the integration of visual information.

== Awards and honors ==
In 1948, Hartline was elected to the United States National Academy of Sciences. He was elected to the American Philosophical Society in 1952 and the American Academy of Arts and Sciences in 1957. He was elected to the inaugural class of Fellows of the Optical Society (OSA) of America in 1959. Later, OSA elected him an Honorary Member in 1980. Hartline was elected a Foreign Member of the Royal Society (ForMemRS) in 1966. He was awarded the Nobel Prize in Physiology or Medicine in 1967.

== Personal life ==
Hartline married Elizabeth Kraus Hartline in 1936. They had three children: Daniel, Peter, and Frederick Hartline.
