= Aquin (disambiguation) =

Aquin is commune in the Aquin Arrondissement, in the Sud department of Haiti.

Aquin may also refer to:

== People ==
- Emmanuel Aquin (born 1968), Canadian novelist, screenwriter, editor, graphic artist and illustrator
- François Aquin (1929–2017), Canadian politician
- Hubert Aquin (1929–1977), Canadian novelist, political activist, essayist, filmmaker and editor

== Places ==
  - Aquin City, principal town of the Aquin commune
- Aquin Arrondissement, an administrative sub-division of the Sud department in southwestern Haiti

== Other uses ==
- Aquin Catholic Schools, a private Catholic school system in Freeport, Illinois, USA
- Aquin Components, software company, based in Frankfurt, Germany
- The Quest for Saint Aquin, science fiction short story by Anthony Boucher originally published in 1951
