= Denise Bombardier =

Canadian essayist, novelist and media personality (1941–2023)

Denise Bombardier CM CQ
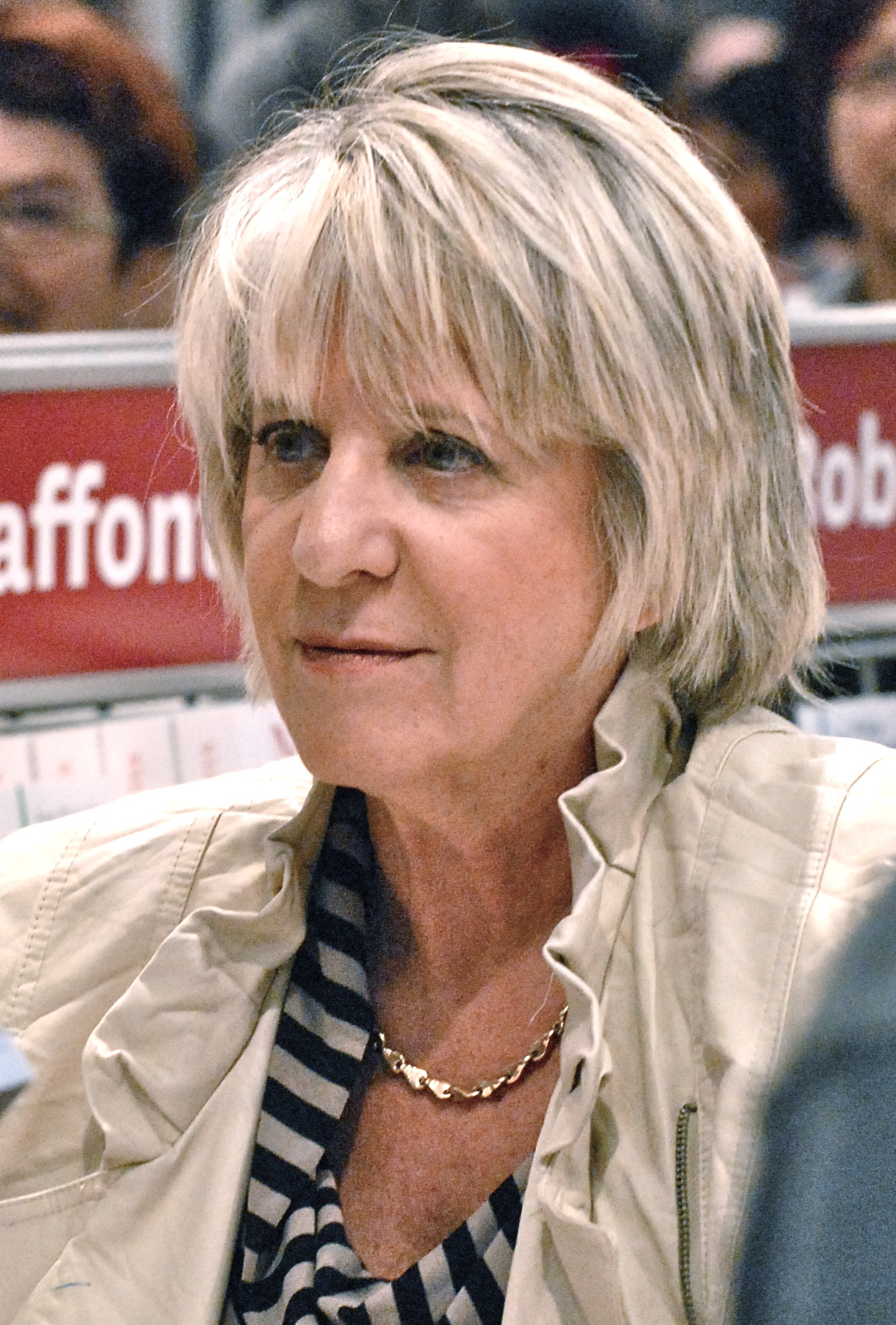
- Bombardier in 2012
- Born: January 18, 1941; Montreal, Quebec, Canada
- Died: July 4, 2023 (aged 82); Montreal, Quebec, Canada
- Occupations: Journalist; essayist; novelist; media personality
- Years active: 1975–2023

Denise Bombardier CM CQ (French pronunciation: [dəniz bɔ̃baʁdje]. Marie Louise Yvette Denise Bombardier, January 18, 1941 – July 4, 2023) was a Canadian journalist, essayist, novelist and media personality who worked for the French-language television network Radio-Canada for over 30 years.

Bombardier was a defender of the international Francophonie and often invited by Bernard Pivot to discuss the psyche of the French and the situation of the French language in France.

== Biography ==
Denise Bombardier obtained a master's degree in political science from the Université de Montréal in 1971 and a doctorate in sociology three years later from the Sorbonne.

Bombardier began her professional career as a research assistant on the Radio-Canada television program Aujourd'hui. Starting in 1975 she hosted a number of programs such as Présent international, Hebdo-dimanche, Noir sur blanc (1979–1983), Le Point and Entre les lignes. She hosted Trait-d'union from 1987 to 1988, and participated on Aujourd'hui dimanche (1988–1991) and L'Envers de la médaille.

Noir sur blanc was the first public affairs program to be hosted by a woman in Quebec. There Bombardier interviewed Prime Minister of Canada Pierre Trudeau, novelist Georges Simenon, Prime Minister of Israel Golda Meir, President of France Valéry Giscard d'Estaing and his successor François Mitterrand.

In 1999, she hosted and produced the science program Les Années lumières on Radio-Canada radio.

Bombardier wrote a number of articles in the press, some of which were controversial. Her articles appeared in Le Monde, Le Devoir, L'Express de Toronto, Châtelaine, Le Point and L'Actualité. She also wrote La Voix de la France (1975), Une enfance à l'eau bénite (1985), Aimez-moi les uns les autres (1999), Nos chères amies (2008), and L'énigmatique Céline Dion (2009).

In 2003, she was fired via e-mail from the public television network Radio-Canada for engaging in a debate on same-sex marriage against Louis Godbout, spokesperson for the Quebec Gay Archives, during an interview-format segment of Le Point, an evening information show. She has been scathing about reality television programs, especially Quebec's Star Académie.

In 2007, Bombardier wrote the song "La diva" for Céline Dion, included on the album D'elles. She also followed Céline Dion during her Taking Chances World Tour as research for her book L'énigmatique Céline Dion.

Bombardier died on July 4, 2023, following a brief battle with cancer. She was 82.

She was married three times. She left her first husband in 1970 for an affair with producer Claude Sylvestre of Radio-Canada, marrying him in 1973. In 1985 on a trip to Paris, she was introduced to then-Canadian ambassador Lucien Bouchard. She left her husband, flew back to Paris and moved into the Canadian embassy with her young son. After six months, she returned to Montreal and her husband. Within a year, the couple split again. She finally found love with Irishman James "Jim" Jackson, a professor of French literature from Dublin. She is survived by one son, Guillaume Sylvestre and two grandchildren.

== Views ==
=== Gabriel Matzneff ===
In 1990, during an appearance on the French talk show Apostrophes, Bombardier confronted the French writer and pedophile Gabriel Matzneff.

Bombardier asked, "How did they do afterward, these young girls?"

Her scathing attack on the popular prime-time show caused a sensation and she was ferociously reviled. The following day, journalist, writer and lyricist Jacques Lanzmann declared that he did not understand why Matzneff did not slap her in the face real hard (aligné la Bombardier d'une grande baffe en pleine figure).

At the time, Bombardier was also insulted in the press by Josyane Savigneau.

But, in January 2020, writer and editor Vanessa Springora published a book, Le Consentement, a memoir of having been sexually abused by Matzneff between the ages of 14 and 16, when he was more than three times her age. It sparked an international furore, and Matzneff, driven from Paris, took refuge on the Italian Riviera. The Paris prosecutor's office opened an investigation after an 'analysis' of the book. The case was dropped due to the statute of limitations having been exceeded.

=== The Decline of the Whites ===
In 2019, Bombardier wrote the column "The Decline of the Whites." She started by noting the demographic fact that in many US cities, whites are already in the minority, and she stated that by 2050, in such countries as Canada, New Zealand and the US, whites could become a minority group.

== Bibliography ==
- La Voix de la France (1975)
- Une enfance à l'eau bénite (1985)
- Le mal de l'âme (with Claude Saint-Laurent, 1989)
- Tremblement de cœur (1990)
- La déroute des sexes (1993)
- Nos hommes (1995)
- Aimez-moi les uns les autres (1999)
- Lettre ouverte aux Français qui se croient le nombril du monde (2000)
- Propos d'une moraliste (2003)
- Et quoi encore! (2004)
- Sans complaisance (2005)
- Nos chères amies (2008)
- L'énigmatique Céline Dion (2009)
- L'Anglais (2012)
- Une vie sans peur et sans regret. Mémoires (2019)

== Selected filmography ==
- Présent international
- Hebdo-dimanche
- Noir sur blanc
- Point
- Entre les lignes.
- Trait-d'union (1987–1988)
- Aujourd'hui dimanche (1988–1991)
- L'Envers de la médaille
- Parlez-moi des hommes, parlez-moi des femmes (2001–2002)

== Awards and recognition ==
- In 1993, she was made a Knight of the Légion d'honneur.
- In 2000, she was made a Knight of the National Order of Quebec.
- In 2015, she was made a Member of the Order of Canada.

== In media ==
Bombardier championed Next Episode by Hubert Aquin (translation of Prochain épisode by Sheila Fischman) in Canada Reads 2003. In the 2007 edition of Canada Reads, an "all-star" competition pitting the five winning advocates from previous years against each other, Bombardier returned to champion Gabrielle Roy's novel Children of My Heart.
