= Gabriel Matzneff =

French writer and pedophile (born 1936)

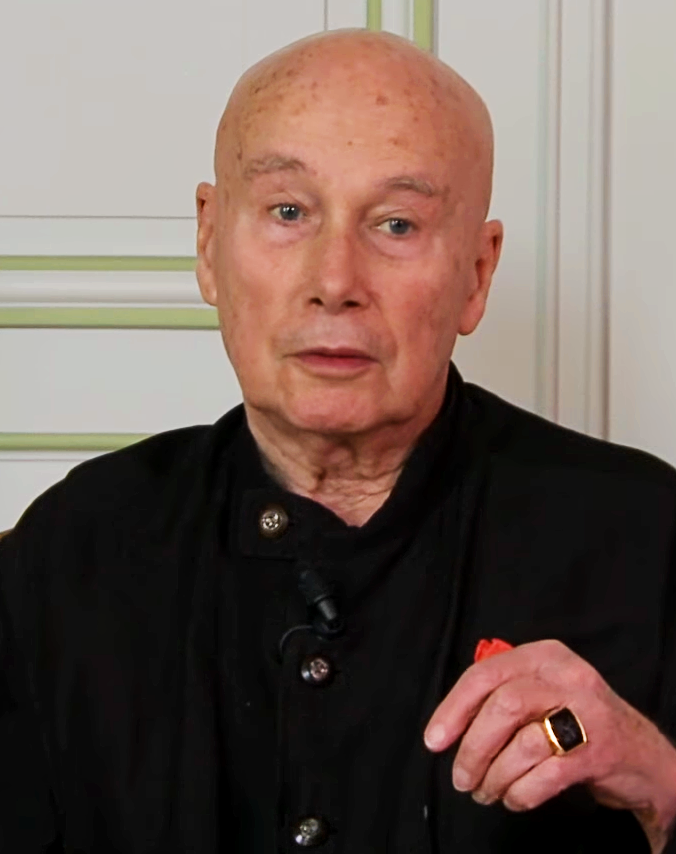
- Matzneff in 2015
- Born: Gabriel Michel Hippolyte Matzneff; 12 August 1936 (age 90); Neuilly-sur-Seine, France
- Education: University of Paris
- Occupation: Writer
- Spouse: Tatiana Scherbatcheff (m. 1970; div. 1973)
- Writing career
- Period: 1961–present

Gabriel Michel Hippolyte Matzneff (French: [ɡabʁijɛl matsnɛf]; born 12 August 1936) is a French writer and pedophile. During the 1980s, he made several trips to the Philippines where, as he described in one of his books, he raped pre-adolescent boys, some as young as 8 years old. Matzneff remained sheltered from prosecution throughout his literary career, benefiting from wide and enthusiastic support within French literary circles.

In February 2020, following intense media coverage of a book published by one of his victims, Vanessa Springora, French prosecutors announced that a criminal investigation had been launched, though the statute of limitations meant the case was dismissed.

He was the winner of the Mottard and Amic awards from the Académie française in 1987 and 2009, respectively, the Prix Renaudot essay in 2013, and the Prix Cazes in 2015. He is known for his descriptions of his pedophilia and child sex tourism in print, online, and on television.

== Biography ==
=== Family, youth, and education ===
Born on 12 August 1936 in Neuilly-sur-Seine, Matzneff came from a family of Russian émigrés who settled in France after 1917. According to information available on his official website, "his parents divorced when he was six months old; throughout his childhood, he never saw them in the same room, and would often be separated from his sister Alexandra and his brothers André and Nicolas".

His mother was Russian Jewish, while his father was Russian Orthodox. He was raised in Russian Orthodoxy. It was a "childhood tossed to and fro, overshadowed by family breakdowns and war. It was a childhood which still causes him very painful memories."

His family raised him in a refined cultural environment, rubbing shoulders with such famous Russian figures as Lev Shestov and Nikolai Berdyaev. It is here he discovered literature and religion. Matzneff spent a year attending the Gerson private Catholic school (1943–44), two in Lycée Saint-Louis-de-Gonzague (1944–46), then moved to a school in Tannenberg from 1946 to 1952, and from 1952 attended Lycée Carnot. In 1954 he commenced his studies on classical letters and philosophy at the Sorbonne. After completing his military service in Algeria between 1959 and 1960, Matzneff returned to Paris in 1961. He enrolled as a Russian speaker at the Institut national des langues et civilisations orientales and began a career as a journalist.

He met fellow author Henry de Montherlant in June 1957 and remained his friend, in spite of quarrels, until de Montherlant's suicide in 1972.

He began to keep his diary on 1 August 1953 but did not publish it until 1976. In the first volume, he vowed to be a sentimental libertine: "I was Athos, the great misanthrope lord, secret, different...".

=== Literary career ===
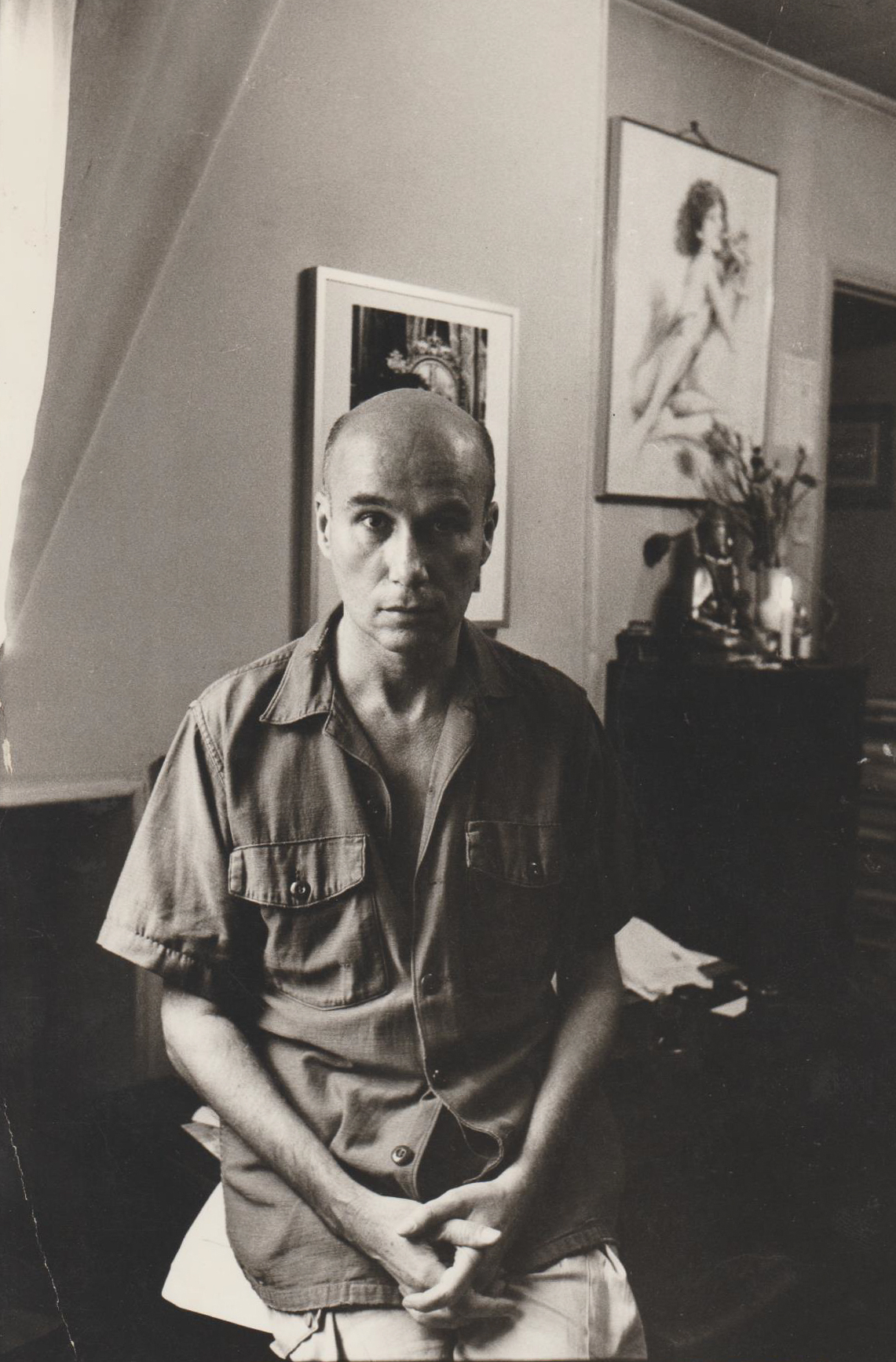
Rue des Ursulines, Paris, 1983

In October 1962, the publication director of Combat, who had noticed his work, asked him to write a column for his daily. During the following decades, Matzneff was to be a regular or occasional columnist for several newspapers and magazines of all political stripes, including Le Quotidien de Paris, Le Figaro and Le Monde. From 2013 to December 2019, he kept an irregular column on the web edition of Le Point.

In October 1964 he took part in the founding congress of the Coordinating Committee of Orthodox Youth, where he met the high school student Tatiana Scherbatcheff.

His first book, Le Défi, a collection of essays, was published in 1965. The following year he published his first novel, L'Archimandrite, which he had begun writing during his military service. During the 1970s, he made a number of trips to the Middle East as well as to Poland and the Soviet Union. During the 1980s, he made several trips to the Philippines where, as he described in one of his books, he raped pre-adolescent boys that he had picked up at Harrison Plaza, Manilla's main shopping centre.

The critic Pol Vandromme wrote in 1974 that he was "the most notable writer of his generation".

In 1990, Matzneff joined Gallimard with the help of Philippe Sollers, who published his 1979–1982 collection of diary entries, "Les Soleils révolus". Gallimard paid monthly royalties to Matzneff until 2004.

Gallimard, the leading French publishing group and Matzneff's historical publisher for 30 years, abruptly stopped marketing the author's books in early January 2020 and recalled his books from bookstores, less than two months after having published L'Amante de l'Arsenal, the last instalment of Matzneff's diary. On 12 February 2020, police searched the headquarters of Éditions Gallimard looking for, among other things, unpublished manuscripts detailing Matzneff's paedophilic activities.

Matzneff was the winner of the Prix Renaudot for best essay in 2013 and the Prix Cazes in 2015.

=== Child rape ===
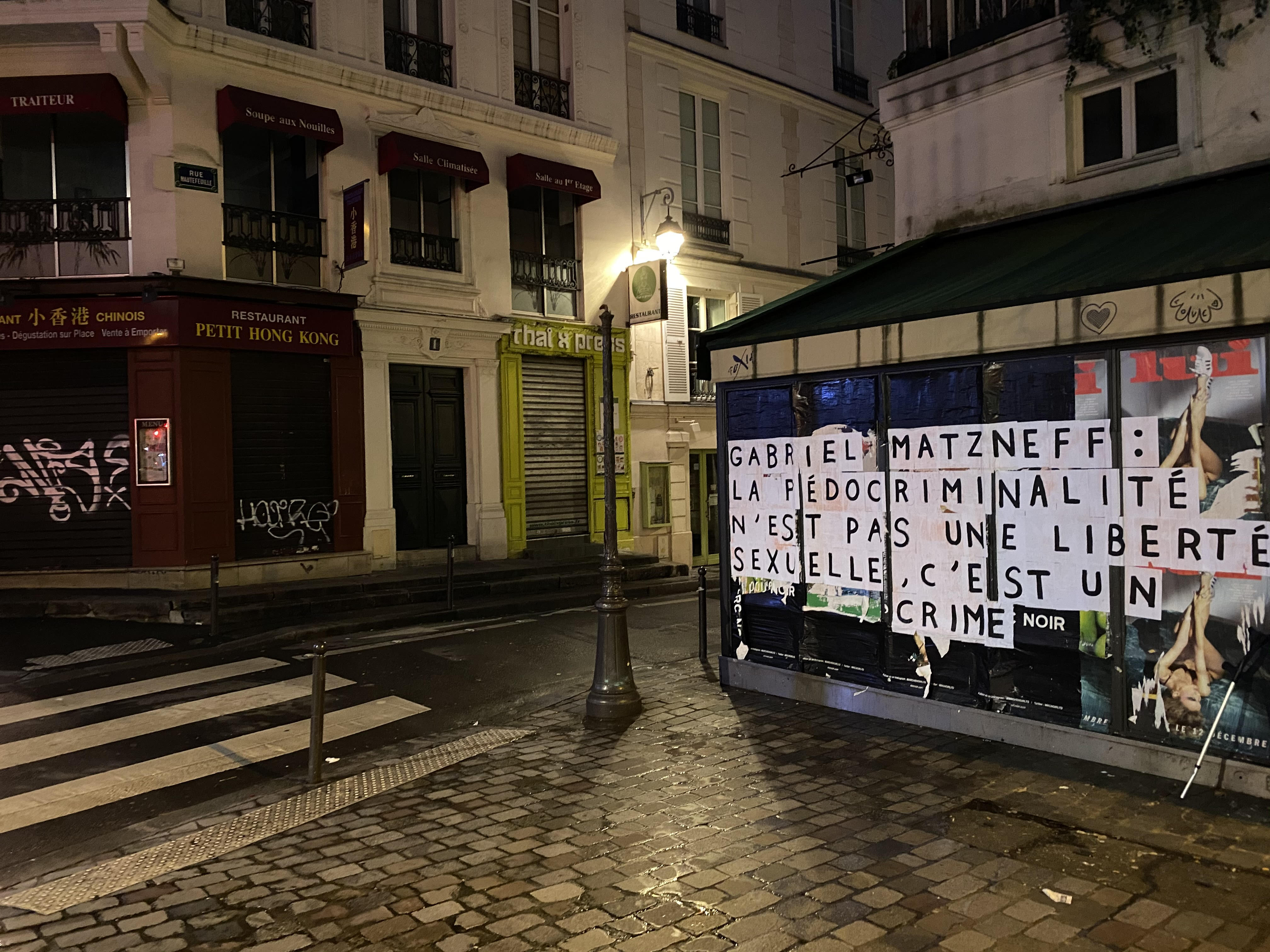
A collage in the 6th arrondissement of Paris which reads, "Gabriel Matzneff: pedocriminality is not a sexual freedom, it is a crime" (January 2020).

Matzneff had long described raping children in his work; his diary Un Galop d'Enfer, published in 1985, stated that whilst in the Philippines he would regularly engage in sex tourism with underage boys. He wrote that "Sometimes, I'll have as many as four boys—from 8 to 14 years old—in my bed at the same time, and I'll engage in the most exquisite lovemaking with them." Already in Mes amours décomposés (1983–1984), he had enthusiastically written that he has recourse to prostitution in Asia: "How restful prostitution is! Kids who sleep with me without loving me, that is, without attempting to eat up my energy and my time, what a sinecure! Yes, back to Asia as soon as possible!" In her 2014 book about pedophilia from the 19th to the 21st century, Anne-Claude Ambroise-Rendu pointed out that remarks like these did not seem to bother anyone.

In 1990, during an appearance on the French talk show Apostrophes, he was confronted about this by Canadian writer and journalist Denise Bombardier. Her scathing attack on the popular prime-time show caused a sensation and she was ferociously reviled. The following day, journalist, writer and lyricist Jacques Lanzmann declared that he did not understand why Matzneff did not slap her in the face real hard (aligné la Bombardier d’une grande baffe en pleine figure). Two weeks later, writer, publisher and film-maker Philippe Sollers, who published Matzneff at Gallimard, called her "a badly fucked bitch" (connasse mal-baisée) on TV. Josyane Savigneau, in charge of the literary section of Le Monde, mocked Bombardier for her provincialism: "Denise Bombardier had the stupidity to almost call for the arrest of Matzneff for 'having defiled young girls'. To discover in 1990 that young girls of 15 and 16 have sex with men thirty years older, big deal!"

Matzneff remained sheltered from any criminal prosecution for decades, and benefited from broad support within the French literary world. At the end of 2019 one of his former victims, Vanessa Springora—the director of Éditions Julliard—published the book Le Consentement, describing the effect that Matzneff had on her at the age of 14. Her book ignited controversy over the tolerance of the literary milieu towards an admitted paedophile. This led Éditions Gallimard to withdraw their marketing services for some of his works, in particular Carnets noirs and Les Moins de seize ans, with other publishers to follow. In 2023, Vanessa Filho adapted the memoir into the film Consent, starring Kim Higelin as Springora and Jean-Paul Rouve as Matzneff.

At the beginning of 2020, the Paris prosecutor's office opened an investigation against Matzneff for "rape of a minor under the age of 15". As expected, the case was dismissed due to the statute of limitations.

Matzneff's career, along with that of fellow French author Tony Duvert, has been cited to illustrate how oblivious and complacent French literary and intellectual circles were regarding pedophilia during past decades.

== Work ==
=== Diaries ===
The original title of the series, until 2009, was "Journal", both in editions of the Round Table, from 1976 to 1991, and in Gallimard editions, from 1990 to 2007. According to the general catalog of the National Library of France, from 2009, with the publication by Éditions Léo Scheer, the overall title was changed to: Carnets noirs ("Black Notebooks").

Black Notebooks

- Cette camisole de flammes: 1953-1962 [This flaming straitjacket] (in French), Paris: Éditions de la Table ronde, 1976, p. 262, BnF 34557030f
- L'Archange aux pieds fourchus : 1963-1964 [The Archangel with cloven hooves: 1963-1964] (in French), Paris: Éditions de la Table ronde, 1982, p. 233, ISBN 2-7103-0133-4, BnF 34737851j
- Vénus et Junon : 1965-1969 [Venus and Juno: 1965-1969] (in French), Paris: Éditions de la Table ronde, 1979, p. 307, ISBN 2-7103-0012-5, BnF 34636949v
- Élie et Phaéton : 1970-1973 [Elijah and Phaeton: 1970-1973] (in French), Paris: Éditions de la Table ronde, 1991, p. 386, ISBN 2-7103-0470-8, BnF 35414867d
- La Passion Francesca : 1974-1976, L'infini, Paris: Éditions Gallimard, 1998, p. 339, ISBN 978-2-07-075221-8, BnF 36703098p
- Un galop d'enfer : 1977-1978 [A gallop from hell: 1977-1978] (in French), Paris: Éditions de la Table ronde, 1985, p. 294, ISBN 2-7103-0250-0, BnF 34871681g
- Les Soleils révolus : 1979-1982 [The Suns Completed: 1979-1982], L'infini (in French), Paris: Éditions Gallimard, 2001, p. 544, ISBN 978-2-07-076027-5, BnF 372216856
- Mes amours décomposés : 1983-1984 [My broken down loves: 1983-1984], L'infini (in French), Paris: Éditions Gallimard, 1990, p. 381, ISBN 978-2-07-071802-3, BnF 35067165v
- "Calamity Gab : janvier 1985 – avril 1986" [Calamity Gab: January 1985 - April 1986], L'infini (in French), Paris: Éditions Gallimard, 2004, p. 361, ISBN 978-2070732654, BnF 391539559
- La Prunelle de mes yeux : 1986-1987 [Apple of my eye: 1986-1987], L'infini (in French), Paris: Éditions Gallimard, 1993, p. 337, ISBN 978-2-07-073174-9, BnF 356015132
- Les Demoiselles du Taranne : journal 1988, L'infini, Paris: Éditions Gallimard, 2007, p. 396, ISBN 978-2-07-078399-1, BnF 41004733g
- Carnets noirs 2007-2008 [Black Notebooks 2007-2008] (in French), Paris: Éditions Léo Scheer, 2009, p. 512, ISBN 978-2756101811, BnF 41442267f

Journal

- "Mais la musique soudain s'est tue : Journal 2009-2013" [But the music suddenly fell silent: Journal 2009-2013], Blanche (in French), Paris: Éditions Gallimard, 2015, p. 528, ISBN 978-2-07-014542-3
- La Jeune Moabite : Journal 2013-2016 [Young Moabite: Journal 2013-2016], Blanche (in French), Paris: Éditions Gallimard, 2017, p. 702, ISBN 978-2-07-273267-6
- L'Amante de l'Arsenal : Journal 2016-2018 [Lover of the Arsenal: Journal 2016-2018], Blanche (in French), Paris: Éditions Gallimard, 2019, p. 432, ISBN 978-2-07-285442-2

=== Novels ===
Gabriel Matzneff is the author of several novels with the same hero, Nil Kolytcheff. These are: Isaïe réjouis-toi; Ivre du vin perdu; Harrison Plaza; Mamma, li Turchi!; Voici venir le fiancé; La Lettre au capitaine Brunner.

- L'Archimandrite, Paris: éditions de la Table ronde, 1966, p. 222, ISBN 2-7103-00427, BnF 40090166j
- Nous n'irons plus au Luxembourg [We will no longer go to Luxembourg] (in French) (1st ed.), Paris: éditions de la Table ronde, 1972, p. 245, BnF 35213179w
- Isaïe réjouis-toi [Isaiah rejoice] (in French), Paris: éditions de la Table ronde, 1974, p. 251 BnF 352146127
- Ivre du vin perdu [Drunk on lost wine] (in French), Paris: éditions de la Table ronde, 1981, p. 323, ISBN 2-7103-0065-6 BnF 346611419
- Harrison Plaza (in French), Paris: éditions de la Table ronde, 1988, p. 235, ISBN 2-7103-0352-3 BnF 349382059
- Les Lèvres menteuses [Lying lips] (in French), Paris: éditions de la Table ronde, 1992, p. 7, ISBN 2-7103-0527-5 BnF 35525394j
- "Les Aventures de Nil Kolytcheff" [The Adventures of Nile Kolytcheff], Les romanesques (in French), Paris: éditions Jean-Claude Lattès, 1994, p. 805, ISBN 2-7096-1491-X, BnF 357393226
- Mamma, li Turchi! [Mother, the Turks!] (in Italian), Paris: éditions de la Table ronde, 2000, p. 271, ISBN 2-7103-0984-X, BnF 371198948
- Voici venir le fiancé [Here comes the fiance] (in French), Paris: éditions de la Table ronde, 2006, p. 313, ISBN 2710327090, BnF 40130100j
- Les Émiles de Gab la Rafale, roman électronique (in French), Paris: Éditions Léo Scheer, 2010, ISBN 978-2756102641
- La Lettre au capitaine Brunner [A letter to Captain Brunner] (in French), Paris: la Table Ronde, 2015, p. 208, ISBN 978-2-7103-7586-9 - winner of the Cazes-Brasserie Lipp prize, 2015

=== Essays ===
- Le Défi [The Challenge] (in French), Paris: éditions de la Table ronde, 1965 - Le Défi - Nouvelle édition, revue et augmentée [The Challenge - New edition, revised and expanded] (in French), Paris: éditions de la Table ronde, 1977, BnF 35001130h
- La Caracole (in French), Paris: éditions de la Table ronde, 1969
- "Les Moins de seize ans" [Those Less than 16], Idée fixe (in French), Paris: éditions Julliard, p. 125, 1974, BnF 34559062j
- "Les Passions schismatiques" [Schismatic Passions], Le Monde ouvert (in French), Paris: éditions Stock, 1977, p. 160, ISBN 2-234-00771-2, BnF 345867642
- La Diététique de lord Byron [The Dietetics of Lord Byron] (in French), Paris: éditions de la Table ronde, 1984, p. 215, ISBN 2-7103-0185-7, BnF 34752435d
- Le Sabre de Didi : pamphlet [Didi's Saber: pamphlet] (in French), Paris: éditions de la Table ronde, 1986, p. 266, ISBN 2-7103-0298-5, BnF 348777816. – This is a revised and expanded edition of La Caracole, a collection of texts from various sources, published between 1963 and 1986
- Le Taureau de Phalaris: dictionnaire philosophique [The Bull of Phalaris: philosophical dictionary] (in French), Paris: éditions de la Table ronde, 1987, p. 300, ISBN 2-7103-0313-2, BnF 34908696x – reissued in the 1994 collection "La Petite Vermillon"
- Maîtres et complices [Masters and accomplices] (in French), Paris: éditions Jean-Claude Lattès, 1994, p. 313, ISBN 2-7096-1485-5, BnF 36680568w – reissued in the collection "La Petite Vermillon"
- Le Dîner des mousquetaires [The Musketeers' Dinner] (in French), Paris: éditions de la Table ronde, 1995, p. 408, ISBN 2-7103-0686-7, BnF 357894722. – a collection of articles from various sources, published between 1961 and 1993
- "De la rupture" [Break up], Manuels Payot (in French), Paris: éditions Payot & Rivages, 1997, p. 167, ISBN 2-228-89070-7, BnF 35860367s
- C'est la gloire, Pierre-François ! [It's glory, Pierre-François!] (in French), Paris: éditions de la Table ronde, 2002, p. 284, ISBN 2-7103-2479-2, BnF 388062554 – a collection of texts from various sources, published between 1962 and 2001
- "Yogourt et yoga" [Yogurt and yoga], Vermillon (in French), Paris: éditions de la Table ronde, 2004, p. 267, ISBN 978-2-7103-2671-7, BnF 39140535n – a collection of texts, from various sources, published between 1962 and 2003
- Vous avez dit métèque ? (in French), Paris: éditions de la Table ronde, 2008, p. 415, ISBN 978-2-7103-3087-5, BnF 41362523w & mdash; a collection of 107 articles published between 1958 and 2007
- La Séquence de l'énergumène [The Sequence of a madman] (in French), éditions Léo Sheer, 2012, p. 340, ISBN 978-2-7561-0360-0 - chronicles appearances on television shows in the 1960s
- Séraphin c'est la fin ! [The end of the Seraphin!] (in French), Paris: La Table Ronde, 2013, p. 266, ISBN 978-2-7103-7006-2 – winner of the Renaudot Prize for essays, 2013
- Un diable dans le bénitier [A devil in the stoup] (in French), Paris: Éditions Stock, 2017, p. 380, ISBN 978-2-234-08254-0

=== Stories ===
- Le Carnet arabe [The Arab Notebook] (in French), Paris: éditions de la Table ronde, 1971, p. 231, BnF 35173361f – reissued in the collection "La Petite Vermillon"
- Comme le feu mêlé d'aromates : récit [Like fire mixed with aromatics: story] (in French), Paris: éditions de la Table ronde, 1989, p. 176, ISBN 2-7103-1168-2, BnF 35001130h
- "Boulevard Saint-Germain", La fantaisie du voyageur (in French), Monaco and Paris: éditions du Rocher, 1998, p. 194, ISBN 2-268-03059-8, BnF 37069451r
- Monsieur le comte monte en ballon [The Count goes up in a balloon] (in French), Paris: Éditions Léo Scheer, 2012, p. 72, ISBN 978-2-7561-0387-7

=== Poetry ===
- The 37th edition of the journal Recherches, edited by Félix Guattari, contains a poem by Gabriel Matzneff in his dossier Fous d'enfance : qui a peur des pédophiles ? (which in English is "Crazy about childhood: who is afraid of paedophiles?") Other contributors: Luc Rosenzweig, Gilbert Villerot, Jean-Luc Hennig, René Schérer, Bernard Faucon, Guy Hocquenghem...), Éditions Recherches, 1979.
- "Douze poèmes pour Francesca" [Twelve poems for Francesca], Lettres 5 (in French), Lausanne: éditions A. Eibel, 1977, p. 41, ISBN 2-8274-0010-3, BnF 346022062
- Super Flumina Babylonis : poèmes [By the rivers of Bablyon – poems] (in French), Paris: éditions de la Table ronde, 2000, p. 97, ISBN 2-7103-0959-9, BnF 37111035m

== Bibliography ==
- Lisi Cori, La Petite Fille et le Vilain Monsieur : Sur Gabriel Matzneff et le Consentement, 2021
