= Homosexual Desire =

1972 book

- Book cover for Le désir homosexuel (second edition, 1977)
- Author: Guy Hocquenghem
- Original title: Le désir homosexuel
- Language: French
- Genre: Non-fiction
- Publication date: 1972

Homosexual Desire (French: Le désir homosexuel) is a 1972 book by French intellectual Guy Hocquenghem. The book is polemical and focuses on the desire of homosexual men, the power of the phallus as a cultural symbol, and sexual liberation. It was the first book in the queer theoretical movement of asociality.

== Background ==
Guy Hocquenghem was a 25-year-old intellectual who founded the Front homosexuel d'action révolutionnaire, a radical French organization that opposed standard political organization and disassociated itself with making demands for the future. He was active in the New Left and its internal disagreements over the nature of homosexuality, as well as the psychoanalytic theoretical scene in France. He was a close friend of René Schérer, a French theorist who sought to eliminate negative cultural attitudes toward pedophilia and child sexuality.

== Publication and contents ==
Homosexual Desire, originally Le désir homosexuel, was written by Guy Hocquenghem and published in the French language by Éditions Universitaires in 1972. The book was translated into English in 1978 by Daniella Dangoor; this translation was reprinted in the United States in 1993. In 2017, the book was translated into Spanish as El deseo homosexual and Spanish critical theorist Paul B. Preciado contributed an afterword.

The book is polemical and sought the liberation of homosexual men over their assimilation. The primary aim of the book is to reduce the symbolic value of the phallus over society; for Hocquenghem, the dominance of the phallus leads to the subordination of women and homosexual men, and many social problems can be traced to the phallus. He argues that homosexual desire – inward feelings of same-sex attraction that are at once produced and repressed by heterosexist society (Note: Homosexuality as a distinct clinical pathology and identity was, for Hocquenghem, created in the 1800s. It was developed as a category to exclude certain groups of people from power and to maintain the social order.) – can be political, and that like the civil unrest in the May 68 movement, it can lead to the liberation of homosexual men. In his argument, homosexual desire is focused on the anus (a valueless organ), so it cannot be concerned with futurity. He argues that the repression of homosexual desire – not the death drive of Freud's psychoanalysis – leads to men lashing out in masochist fits of rage in attempts to liberate themselves (in modern parlance, internalised homophobia). Hocquenghem's notion of sexual liberation also included children; he argued that children are oppressed by society for their sexuality, and that adult–child sex is not an inherently abusive practice.

== Reception and legacy ==
The publication of Homosexual Desire preceded Michel Foucault's The History of Sexuality by four years, another influential book in the study of desire and homosexual identity. It was the first queer theoretical work about queer antisociality, (Note: The first work is sometimes identified as Leo Bersani's essay "Is the Rectum a Grave?".) a theory – advanced by writers like Lee Edelman – declaring homosexuality incompatible with many of society's values.

== Notes and references ==
=== Bibliography ===
- Bernini, Lorenzo (2017). Queer apocalypses: Elements of antisocial theory. Palgrave Macmillan. ISBN 9783319433615.
- Everett, Julin (2018). Le queer impérial. Francopolyphonies. Brill. ISBN 9789004365544.
- Moore, Stephen D.; Brintnall, Kent L.; Marchal, Joseph A. (2018). "Introduction – Queer disorientations: Four turns and a twist". Sexual disorientations: Queer temporalities, affects, theologies (first ed.). Fordham University Press.
- Paternotte, David (2014). "Pedophilia, homosexuality and gay and lesbian activism". In Hekma, Gert; Giami, Alain (eds.). Sexual revolutions. Genders and Sexualities in History. Palgrave Macmillan. ISBN 9781137321459.
- Penney, James (2004). "The schizoanalytic protest: Homosexual Desire revisited". Angelaki. 9 (1): 67–83. doi:10.1080/0969725042000232405. S2CID 151857631.
- Schehr, Lawrence R. (1996). "Defense and illustration of gay liberation". Yale French Studies (90): 139–152. doi:10.2307/2930361. JSTOR 2930361.
- Shively, Charley (11 November 1978). "Keeping Stonewall ... alive". Book Review. Gay Community News. Vol. 6, no. 16. pp. 3, 7.
