= Andrée Yanacopoulo =

Canadian physician and writer (1927–2025)

Andrée Yanacopoulo (14 November 1927 – 27 August 2025) was a Tunisian-born Canadian doctor, writer, translator, teacher and sociologist based in Quebec.

== Life and career ==
Yanacopoulo was born in Tunis, Tunisia on 14 November 1927. She studied medicine at the University of Lyon, France, and also holds a master's degree in sociology. She settled in Quebec in 1960. From 1961 to 1964, she was a professor of sociology at the Université de Montréal. She then taught at Collège Sainte-Marie and the Université du Québec à Montréal until 1973, then at the Cégep de Saint-Laurent until 1989.

In parallel, she co-directs with Nicole Brossard for six years the Délire collection at Parti Pris editions and holds several other positions with different publishers.

She wrote a book titled Signé Hubert Aquin: Surcule sur suicide d'écrivain (Signed Hubert Aquin: investigation on the suicide of a writer), after the death of his spouse. She is editor for her publishing house Vanishing Point.

Yanacopoulo was the partner of Hubert Aquin from 1963 to 1977, with whom she had a son Emmanuel Aquin. She died on 27 August 2025, at the age of 97.

== Publications ==
- In the name of the Father, the Son and Duplessis, 1984
- Signed Hubert Aquin - investigation of a writer's suicide (in collaboration with Gordon Sheppard), 1985
- Suzanne Lamy, 1990
- Hans Selye or the Cathedral of Stress, 1992
- Discovery of multiple sclerosis. The nosographic reason, 1997
- "The Regroupement des Femmes Québécoises", 2003
- Henri F. Ellenberger. A life, 2009
- Simone Monet-Chartrand and Michel: A committed couple, written in collaboration with Paul Labonne, 2010
- Take note, Boreal, 2013.

== Awards ==
- Finalist for the Governor General's Award for essay category (1993)

== Translations ==
- How to love living alone, Lynn Shanan ("Living alone and liking it!"), 1982
- The Memory, Elizabeth Loftus ("Memory"), 1983
