= Is the Rectum a Grave? =

Leo Bersani essay

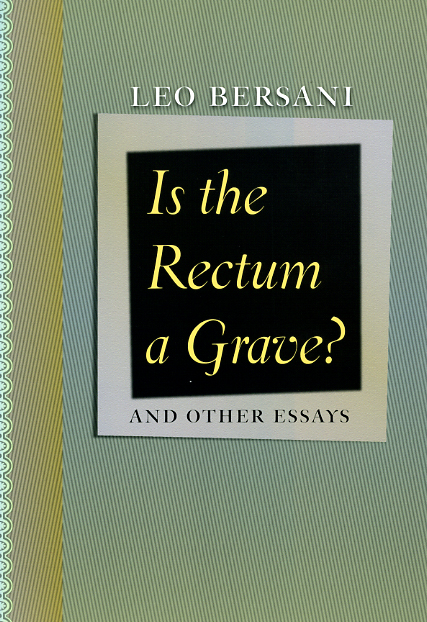
Cover of 2009 publication of "Is the Rectum a Grave?" and Other Essays

"Is the Rectum a Grave?" is a 1987 essay by scholar Leo Bersani. It is an early text in queer theory (although Bersani never considered himself a queer theorist), and provides a non-utopian view of sexuality. The essay was republished in 2009 alongside others by Bersani.

== Background ==
Bersani published "Is the Rectum a Grave?" during the 1987 height of the AIDS epidemic. The title was inspired by two declarations of Simon Watney, an AIDS activist: That AIDS has produced "a new machinery of repression, [by] making the rectum a grave"; and that the public health response to AIDS has refigured gay men's rectums as impenetrable and "Off Limits". The first sentence of Bersani's essay remains famous: "There is a big secret about sex: most people don't like it."

The essay is not utopian; it refutes the desire to view pre-AIDS gay social life as idyllic, saying they were economies of desire with ingrained social orders that excluded many.

== Legacy ==
"Is the Rectum a Grave?" and Bersani's 1995 book, Homos, are seen by cultural critic Robyn Wiegman as part of the "inaugural" foundations of an explicitly anti-social perspective in queer theory. This has been put into question by queer theorist Tim Dean, who says Guy Hocquenghem originated this strand of thought in his Deleuze and Guattari-inspired book Homosexual Desire (1972). Bersani never believed himself to be a part of queer theory, but the essay is nonetheless widely viewed as an early text in the field.

Bersani republished the essay in Is the Rectum a Grave? and Other Essays (2009), a collection of his essays. "Is the Rectum a Grave?" is older than the other essays featured by about a decade, a move seen by queer theorist Brian Glavey as an attempt to refine his theories about sex.

The title has been borrowed by other scholars, such as in "Is the Rectum Straight?" (1991) by Eve Kosofsky Sedgwick and "Are the Lips a Grave?" (2011) by Lynne Huffer.
