= Tony Duvert =

French writer (1945–2008)

- Born: 2 July 1945; Villeneuve-le-Roi, Val-de-Marne, France
- Died: 2008; Loir-et-Cher, Centre-Val de Loire, France
- Occupation: Writer
- Awards: Prix Médicis 1973

Tony Duvert (2 July 1945 – August 2008) was a French writer, primarily known as a self-declared pedophile and an advocate for pedophilia. In the 1970s he achieved some renown, winning the Prix Médicis in 1973 for his novel Paysage de Fantaisie. Duvert's writings are notable both for their style and core themes: the celebration and defence of pedophilia, and criticism of modern child-rearing. In the 1970s, attitudes to sexual liberation and child sexuality allowed Duvert to express himself publicly. However, when attitudes changed markedly in the 1980s, he stopped publishing and withdrew from public life.

== Youth and early writings ==
Tony Duvert was born on 2 July 1945 in Villeneuve-le-Roi, Val-de-Marne. As a child, he was shy and withdrawn, but later wrote that his sex life began when he was eight. Expelled from school at twelve for carrying out sexual acts with other boys, he was sent by his parents to a psychiatrist for treatment: the methods used he described as brutal and humiliating. He ran away from home and attempted suicide. In 1961, Duvert joined the high school Jean-Baptiste Corot in Savigny-sur-Orge, where he was a brilliant student, but with few friends. After high school, he moved to Paris to begin an arts degree but preferred to devote himself to writing.

Duvert made his literary debut in 1967 with Récidive, a gay man's account blending dream and reality. The book was published by Jerôme Lindon of Éditions de Minuit, who recognised the author's potential. However the novel's subject matter made the publisher nervous, and the book was printed in a limited edition of 712 copies available only through subscription and selected bookstores.

Duvert soon produced three successive novels: Interdit de séjour and Portrait d'homme-couteau in 1969, and Le Voyageur in 1970, which were also sold by subscription. As well as their political aspect in promoting sexual relations between adults and children, and criticising bourgeois society, these first four novels featured narrative and stylistic experimentation in the form of rambling style, typographic games, the absence or multiplicity of plots, jumbled chronology or facts, and lack of punctuation.

Openly gay, Duvert advocated for gay rights but conflated homosexuality, pederasty, and pedophilia, which he regarded as the same thing. In his view, a sexual relationship between an adult man and a child constituted homosexuality on the part of the minor and deserved to be respected as such.

== Critical recognition ==
Thanks to Roland Barthes's support, Duvert achieved public recognition in 1973 with his novel Paysage de fantaisie (Strange Landscape), which won the Prix Médicis, and was greeted warmly by critics. For Claude Mauriac the book revealed "gifts and art that the word talent is not enough to express".

In 1974, Duvert expounded his ideology at length in Le Bon Sexe Illustré (Good Sex Illustrated) in which he sharply criticised sex education and the modern western family. Critics praised its humour and his ability to observe the pretences of bourgeois society.

Duvert used his literary prize money to move to Morocco, where he lived for about a year. He spent part of his time there pursuing and having sex with local teenage boys. His next novel Journal d'un Innocent (Journal of an Innocent) published in 1976, was a thinly fictionalized depiction of this experience. Having exhausted his money, he returned to France in late 1975, eventually settling in Tours.

His next novel Quand Mourut Jonathan (When Jonathan Died), published in 1978, was partially autobiographical. In 1973, a neglectful mother had entrusted Duvert with her son for the summer; Duvert then abused the boy. He subsequently wrote the novel about what was, in his view, a tragic love story. Gilles Sebhan, Duvert's biographer, later established that the story was based on real events and that the boy had died of an overdose during the 1980s.

Despite receiving praise from critics, Duvert had not achieved the commercial success he hoped for. To reach a wider audience and raise awareness of his ideas, he decided to write a novel that would incorporate his favourite themes while being less sexually explicit and written in a classic form. The result was L'Île Atlantique (1979, published in English as Atlantic Island in 2017), which received critical raves and sold somewhat better than his previous works.

== Reclusiveness and death ==
In the 1980s, Duvert published L'enfant au masculin (1980), in which he further expounded his views of homosexuality and pedophilia; a novel Un Anneau d'Argent à l'Oreille; and a book of aphorisms Abécédaire Malveillant: unlike his earlier writings, their critical reception was mostly indifferent or poor. By the late 1980s, Duvert was unable to pay the rent on his apartment. With the social mood towards pedophilia hardening in the wake of several abuse scandals, he felt the world had turned against him. He withdrew to his mother's house in Loir-et-Cher, and became a total recluse. Author Bernard Duvert, who had started a correspondence with him in the 1980s because they shared the same name, later told Gilles Sebhan that Tony Duvert had confessed to him about killing a young boy around 1980, and that remorse had caused him to become reclusive. However, Sebhan could find nothing corroborating this story.

Duvert published nothing from 1989, and was largely forgotten. However, in 2005, his 1979 novel L'Île Atlantique was adapted into a television film broadcast on Arte.

Duvert's body was discovered at his home in August 2008, several weeks after his death, in a state of decomposition. Child pornography was found in his home, which Le Nouvel Observateur called the "repulsive terminus of a moral and sexual dead end in which even literature had lost its way". His death briefly raised his media profile in France again; obituaries noted the quality of his writing, but also reflected upon the change in attitudes to pedophilia.

== Legacy ==
Duvert was later compared to Gabriel Matzneff, another French writer who had also built his literary persona around his sexual attraction to minors during the 1970s. Both Duvert and Matzneff have been cited as examples of the complacency of French literary and intellectual circles towards pedophilia during the 1970s.

Gilles Sebhan has published two French-language biographical works on Duvert, Tony Duvert: L'Enfant Silencieux (Éditions Denoël 2010) and Retour à Duvert (le dilettante 2015). To date, neither book has been translated into English.

== Bibliography ==
Novels

- Récidive (Éditions de Minuit, 1967)
- Interdit de séjour (Éditions de Minuit, 1969)
- Portrait d'homme-couteau (Éditions de Minuit, 1969)
- Le voyageur (Éditions de Minuit, 1970)
- Paysage de fantaisie (Éditions de Minuit,1973). Strange Landscape, trans. Sam Flores (Random House, 1976)
- Journal d'un innocent (Éditions de Minuit, 1976). Diary of an Innocent, trans. Bruce Benderson (Semiotext(e), 2010)
- Quand mourut Jonathan (Éditions de Minuit, 1978). When Jonathan Died, trans. D.R. Roberts (Gay Men's Press, 1991)
- L'Île Atlantique (Éditions de Minuit, 1979). Atlantic Island, trans. Purdey Lord Kreiden and Michael Thomas Taren (Semiotext(e), 2017)
- Un anneau d'argent à l'oreille (Éditions de Minuit, 1982)

Essays

- « La parole et la fiction : à propos du Libera », dans Critique n°252, mai 1968. Réédition Éditions de Minuit, 1984
- « La lecture introuvable », in Minuit n° 1, Éditions de Minuit, November 1972); The Undiscoverable Reading, trans. Bruce Benderson (2014)
- « La sexualité chez les crétins », in Minuit n°3, Éditions de Minuit, March 1973, p. 60-72
- « La folie Tristan, ou, L'indésirable », in Minuit n°4, Éditions de Minuit, May 1973, p. 53-70
- Le bon sexe illustré (Éditions de Minuit, 1974). Good Sex Illustrated, trans. Bruce Benderson (Semiotext(e), 2007)
- « L'érotisme des autres », in Minuit n°19, Éditions de Minuit, May 1976, p. 2-12
- L'enfant au masculin (Éditions de Minuit, 1980)
- « Genet contre Bataille », in Masques n°12, Winter 1981–1982
- Abécédaire malveillant (Éditions de Minuit, 1989)

Short stories

- « Ballade des petits métiers », in Minuit n° 24, Éditions de Minuit, April 1977
- District (Fata Morgana, Montpellier, 1978). District, trans. S. C. Delaney and Agnès Potier (Wakefield Press, 2017)
- « Le garçon à la tête dure : inspiré des Mille et une Nuits », in Minuit n° 30, Éditions de Minuit, September 1978
- Les petits métiers (Fata Morgana, 1978). Odd Jobs, trans. S. C. Delaney and Agnès Potier (Wakefield Press, 2017)
- « Conte », in Libération Sandwich n° 4, 22 December 1979

Interviews

- « Tony Duvert – Non à l'enfant poupée », interview by Guy Hocquenghem and Marc Voline, in Libération, 10 and 11 April 1979.
