= Next Episode =

Next Episode may refer to:

- Next Episode (novel), a 1965 novel by Hubert Aquin
- Next Episode (EP), a 2021 EP by AKMU
- "The Next Episode", a 2000 single by Dr. Dre featuring Snoop Dogg, Kurupt, and Nate Dogg
- The Next Episode (album), a 2002 studio album by Next
- "The Next Episode" (Euphoria), an episode from the 2019 American teen drama television series, Euphoria
