= Consent (2023 French film) =

2023 film by Vanessa Filho

- Theatrical release poster
- French: Le Consentement
- Directed by: Vanessa Filho
- Written by: Vanessa Filho; François Pirot; Vanessa Springora
- Based on: Consent by Vanessa Springora
- Produced by: Carole Lambert; Marc Missonier
- Starring: Kim Higelin; Jean-Paul Rouve; Laetitia Casta; Élodie Bouchez
- Cinematography: Guillaume Schiffman
- Edited by: Marion Monestier; Sophie Reine
- Music by: Audrey Ismaël; Olivier Coursier
- Production companies: Moana Films; Windy Production; France 2 Cinéma; Panache Productions
- Distributed by: Pan Distribution (France); Anga Distribution (Belgium)
- Release dates: 11 October 2023 (France and Belgium)
- Running time: 118 minutes
- Countries: France; Belgium
- Language: French
- Budget: €3,7 million
- Box office: $4,6 million

Consent (French: Le Consentement) is a 2023 biographical drama film directed by Vanessa Filho, from a screenplay co-written by Filho, Vanessa Springora, and François Pirot, based on Springora's 2020 best-selling memoir of the same title describing the sexual abuse she experienced beginning at age 14 from author Gabriel Matzneff, then 49. It stars Kim Higelin, Jean-Paul Rouve, Laetitia Casta, and Élodie Bouchez. The film is a co-production between France and Belgium. It was released theatrically in France by Pan Distribution and in Belgium by Anga Distribution on 11 October 2023.

The film received two nominations at the 2024 César Awards, Best Adaptation and Best Female Revelation.

== Plot ==
Vanessa Springora was 14 when she was groomed by Gabriel Matzneff, becoming his muse and victim. After experiences with a troubled home life, Vanessa loses herself under Matzneff's destructive control.

== Cast ==
- Kim Higelin as Vanessa Springora
- Jean-Paul Rouve as Gabriel Matzneff
- Laetitia Casta as Vanessa's mother
- Élodie Bouchez as Vanessa Springora in 2013
- Jean Chevalier as Youri
- Lolita Chammah as the best friend of Vanessa's mother
- David Clavel as Michel
- Agathe Dronne as Christiane
- Christophe Grégoire as Bernard
- Doby Broda as Muriel
- Irène Ismaïloff as the concierge
- Annie Mercier as The doctor
- Anne Loiret as the Latin teacher
- Lilas-Rose Gilberti as Camille
- Tanguy Mercier as Julien
- Selma Tamiatto as Clothilde
- Lou-Ann Trabaud as Agnès
- Héloïse Bresc as Audrey
- Eloi Léger as Nico
- Ferdinand Redouloux as Corentin
- Manon Le Bail as Eva
- Donovan Fouassier as Olivier
- Raphael Romand as Ronnie
- Victor Fruhinsholz as Samuel
- Noam Morgensztern as Jean-Didier Wolfromm
- Félicien Juttner as the lover of Vanessa's mother
- Marie-Christine Letort as Isabelle
- Christophe Kourotchkine as Éric
- Alain Fromager as Alain
- Sébastien Pouderoux as Vanessa's father
- Miglen Mirtchev as Emil Cioran
- Françoise Gazio as Simone Boué
- Anne Benoît as the French teacher

== Filming ==
Principal photography began on 16 May 2022 and wrapped on 30 June 2022.

== Release ==
The film was released theatrically in France by Pan Distribution and in Belgium by Anga Distribution on 11 October 2023.

== Reception ==
=== Critical response ===
AlloCiné, a French cinema site, gave the film an average rating of 3.0/5, based on a survey of 33 French reviews.

=== Box office ===
The film debuted at number 10 at the French box office, selling 59,266 admissions from 195 theaters. After TikTok users shared their experiences after watching the film on the platform, with some videos reaching nearly 2 million views, the film's box office had a boost in its second week, selling 141,848 admissions from 216 theaters and passing the 300,000 admissions mark on 2 November 2023. The film was released to 460 theaters in its fifth weekend and ranked at number nine at the French box office. As of January 2024, the film has sold over 600,000 admissions in France and has grossed $4,6 million worldwide.

== Awards and nominations ==
Year	Award	Category	Recipient(s)	Result	Ref.
2023	Tallinn Black Nights Film Festival	Best Actress	Kim Higelin	Won	
2024	Q d'or	Female Revelation	Kim Higelin	Won	
2024	Paris Film Critics Association Awards	Best Female Revelation	Kim Higelin	Nominated	
2024	Paris Film Critics Association Awards	Best Adapted Screenplay	Vanessa Filho	Nominated	
2024	César Awards	Best Adaptation	Vanessa Filho	Nominated	
2024	César Awards	Best Female Revelation	Kim Higelin	Nominated	
