= When Jonathan Died =

Book by Tony Duvert

- 1978 French edition
- Author: Tony Duvert
- Original title: Quand Mourut Jonathan
- Translator: D.R. Roberts
- Language: French
- Genre: Novel
- Publisher: Editions de Minuit (France); Gay Men's Press (United Kingdom)
- Publication date: 1978 (eng. trans. 26 September 1991)
- Publication place: France
- Media type: Hardback and paperback
- Pages: 176 pp (paperback edition)
- ISBN: 0-85449-154-6 (paperback edition)
- OCLC: 24734894

When Jonathan Died is a novel by Tony Duvert, translated by D.R. Roberts. It was first published in France as Quand Mourut Jonathan in 1978. It tells the story of a sexual and romantic relationship between an adult male and an eight-year old boy. Duvert was himself an avowed pedophile and an advocate for pedophilia. The story was partially autobiographical. Gilles Sebhan, who wrote two books about Duvert's life, could establish that in 1973, a woman had entrusted Duvert for the summer with her son, whom she neglected; Duvert then abused the boy. He later used this as a basis for his novel, which was framed as a tragic love story. The boy, whose real name was Jean, died of an overdose during the 1980s.

== Plot summary ==
Jonathan is a 27-year-old artist living in Paris who befriends a single mother and her six-year-old son, Serge. When Serge is eight, his mother asks Jonathan to look after him for a week, which they spend together at Jonathan's country house in southern France.

Jonathan and Serge become close friends and eventually start a sexual relationship. Jonathan, in love with the boy, is distraught when Serge returns to Paris. They meet each other again when Serge is age 10, and their sexual relationship continues. While Jonathan and Serge are separated, the sexual side of Jonathan's desires begins to dominate his behaviour. He eventually seeks out other young boys; he is rejected by some and finds no real satisfaction in sex with the others.

Serge, fatherless and miserable at home with his aloof and demeaning mother, decides to run away to be with Jonathan. He sets off to find him, but becomes overwhelmed by hopelessness, and when confronted with a busy road to cross at night, commits suicide by throwing himself under a fast-moving car.
