= Liberté (Quebec) =

Canadian literary magazine

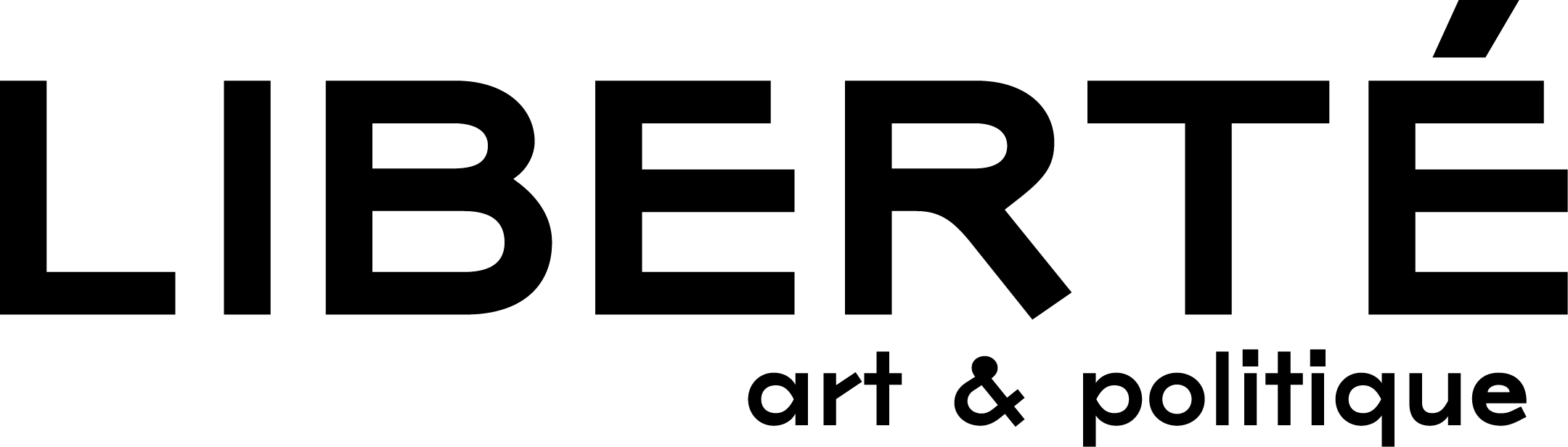
- Editor: Valérie Lefebvre-Faucher, Laurence Perron, Évelyne Ménard
- Categories: Literature, Politics
- Frequency: Quarterly
- Founded: 1959
- First issue: February 1959
- Company: Collectif Liberté
- Country: Canada
- Based in: Montreal, Quebec, Canada
- Language: French
- Website: revueliberte.ca
- ISSN: 0024-2020 (print); 1923-0915 (web)
- OCLC: 937874624

Liberté is a quarterly Quebec literary magazine founded in Montreal in 1959. The founders were Radio-Canada and National Film Board producers Hubert Aquin, André Belleau, Jacques Godbout, Fernand Ouellette, and editor Jean-Guy Pilon. Historically, the journal has been politically centrist, but it took on a new political direction in 2018.

== History ==
=== Founding ===
First discussions of the publication of a new literary journal in Quebec began around 1957 with the poet Jean-Guy Pilon, who would go on to edit the journal for 20 years. The journal was named after the ocean liner that connected Le Havre and New York, which Pilon had boarded on his return from France in 1955.

Liberté's first issue was published in February 1959. At the time, the editorial team consisted of Pilon, Jacques Godbout, Fernand Ouellette, André Belleau, Jean Filiatrault, Paul-Marie Lapointe, Michel van Schendel, Lucien Véronneau, and Gilles Carle. Carle, Hénault, Lapointe, Véronneau, and van Schendel left the journal before the publication of the second issue, perceiving a lack of support for the Radio-Canada producers' strike of 1958–1959.

From its inception, the journal not only dealt with literature and politics but also covered current events in other media, notably the visual arts and music. The place of the intellectual, particularly the writer, within society thus became a central concern in the essay published in Liberté.

=== 1960s and 1970s: Liberté and the Quiet Revolution ===
Liberté's first decades were marked by great political and cultural change in Quebec during the Quiet Revolution. Although the journal never took an official position on the political debates raging in Quebec at the time, it became a forum for discussions in favor of literary autonomy, secularism, sovereignty, and socialism. The question of language was central to these discussions and would become the subject of many contributions to the publication.

Many important figures in Quebec literature, including Michèle Lalonde and Hubert Aquin, published and held management and editorial positions at Liberté during these decades. In a 1962 issue of the journal, Aquin published the essay "La fatigue culturelle du Canada français" (transl. "The Cultural Fatigue of French Canada"), a landmark text that documented the changes Quebec society was undergoing at the time.

Liberté did not publish its fall issue in 1970 due to the October Crisis and the enactment of the War Measures Act. Despite condemning the brutal government and police response to these events and despite the journal's pro-sovereignty stance, the editorial team preferred to maintain its independence by not showing support for the Front de libération du Québec. This led to Aquin abruptly departing from the journal in March 1971 and accusing it of being under the control of the Canada Council for the Arts.

Liberté achieved its greatest popularity during the 1970s: up to 3,000 copies were printed, 1,000 of which were subscription copies. As the second generation of contributors joined the magazine - notably François Hébert and François Ricard in 1975 - the publication offered several texts extolling the Parti Québécois's rise to power in 1976. In 1979, 20 years after Liberté's founding, founder Jean-Guy Pilon left the journal.

=== 1980s and 1990s: The second and third generations of Liberté ===
Following Pilon's departure, François Ricard became editor of the journal, which then took a more polemical turn. Following the failure of the 1980 referendum on Quebec sovereignty, Liberté became critical of several institutions whose creation it had supported in previous decades.

In 1984, three women, Lise Noël, Danielle Trudeau, and Suzanne Robert, joined the committee, which had until then been dominated by men. Despite the contributions of Noël, Trudeau, and Robert, there was notable antifeminist sentiment in the journal during the 1980s. In 1986, François Hébert took over editing duties, and the publication began to focus on issues specific to writing and creation. The 1980s were thus marked by cultural discussions giving way to discussion of politics, as well as by a growing interest in international literature.

=== 2000s to Present: Crisis, cultural resistance, and the journal's rejuvenation ===
In 2000, the journal experienced an unprecedented financial and administrative crisis, resulting in the June issue not being published and long-time contributors departing. In the following years, Liberté experienced further instability in the form of significant staff turnover.

Starting in 2005 and over the following years, a new team formed around editor Pierre Lefebvre. The team sought to reconnect with what it identified as Liberté's politically engaged history, imagined through the figure of Hubert Aquin. Aguin was chosen as the representative of the spirit of Liberté, at the expense of other important contributors throughout the journal's history. The journal then adopted the motto of "cultural resistance," assuming a subversive and critical tone. In celebration of the fiftieth anniversary of the journal's founding, which occurred in 2009, the team, then composed of Pierre Lefebvre, Olivier Kemeid, Robert Richard, Evelyne de la Chenelière, Michel Peterson, and Jean-Philippe Warren, published an anthology of essays from Liberté. Published in 2011 by Le Quartanier, the anthology was titled Lécrivain dans la cité - 50 ans d'essais (The Writer in the City - 50 Years of Essays). In accordance with the team's editorial intent, the anthology focused primarily on the political dimension of Liberté's publishing history, to the exclusion of fiction, literary essays, and poetry.

In 2012, the journal adopted a magazine format and underwent a major overhaul such that it now publishes more essays about political readings of literature than straightforward political essays. The subtitle "art et politique" ("Art and Politics") was adopted at this time.

In 2018, Aurélie Lanctôt and Rosalie Lavoie became co-directors of Liberté. Under their direction, the journal places greater emphasis on current political issues, such as environmentalism, anti-racism, and feminism. Issue 321, published in the fall of 2018 under the theme "First Peoples: Mapping a Liberation," is emblematic of this new direction. The new Lavoie-Lanctôt team sought to relax the editorial team's hierarchy and provide greater space for debate. In 2019, as it celebrated its sixtieth anniversary, Liberté produced two anniversary issues (issues 325 and 326) and proposed an overhaul of its visuals. This political shift rejuvenated the publication's image and brought in new readership. In 2022, Valérie Lefebvre-Faucher replaced Lanctôt as Lavoie's co-director, hoping to continue the shift Lanctôt and Lavoie initiated four years earlier. In 2023, Lavoie left the Liberté team to return to school and study to become a paramedic. She was replaced by Laurence Perron.

== Content and editorial policy ==
Since its founding, Liberté has published fiction, poetry, and literary and political essays. Currently, it focuses on political issues while maintaining a literary and artistic sensibility, and it aims to offer thoughtful and engaging content while remaining accessible to a broad readership.

Liberté issues include sections such as "Chroniques" (Chronicles), "Rencontres" (Encounters), "Dossier," which explores the specific theme of the issue, and "Critique," which features literary, theater, and film reviews, among others. The last section, "Rétroviseur," established in 2013, is a space for the editorial team to revisit significant texts in the publication's history, connecting Liberté's legacy to its present. The journal publishes four issues per year.

Liberté is a member of the Société de développement des période culturels québécois. The Liberté archives are held at the Montreal archives center of the Bibliothèque et Archives nationales du Québec. Issues of the journal have been available digitally on the Érudit platform since 2016, as well as on the official Liberté website.
