= Angel Face (2018 film) =

2018 film

- Film poster
- Directed by: Vanessa Filho
- Written by: Vanessa Filho
- Produced by: Carole Lambert; Marc Missonnier
- Starring: Marion Cotillard; Ayline Aksoy-Etaix; Alban Lenoir; Amélie Daure; Stéphane Rideau
- Cinematography: Guillaume Schiffman
- Edited by: Sophie Reine
- Music by: Olivier Coursier; Audrey Ismael
- Production companies: Windy Productions; Moana Films; Canal+; Ciné+; Playtime; A Plus Image 6
- Distributed by: Mars Distribution
- Release dates: 12 May 2018 (Cannes); 23 May 2018 (France)
- Running time: 108 minutes
- Country: France
- Language: French

Angel Face (French: Gueule d'ange) is a 2018 French drama film directed by Vanessa Filho in her feature directorial debut, from a screenplay by Filho and Diastéme. It stars Marion Cotillard, Ayline Aksoy-Etaix, Alban Lenoir, Amélie Daure and Stéphane Rideau. It had its world premiere at the 2018 Cannes Film Festival in May. It was released theatrically in France by Mars Distribution on 23 May 2018.

== Plot ==
Marlene is an erratic young mother from a working-class background who was left by her husband when she cheated on him during their wedding ceremony. Unemployed, she spends her days watching reality TV shows and getting drunk. Her only source of happiness and pride is Elli, her 8-year-old daughter, whom Marlene affectionately calls "Angel Face". But for the young girl, coping with her mother and her alcoholism is a daily struggle, which makes her mature early.

== Cast ==
- Marion Cotillard as Marlène
- Ayline Aksoy-Etaix as Ellie
- Alban Lenoir as Julio
- Amélie Daure as Chiara
- Nade Dieu as Mathilda
- Stéphane Rideau as Jean
- Rosaline Gohy as Alice

== Production ==
In September 2017, it was announced Marion Cotillard, Ayline Aksoy-Etaix, Alban Lenoir, Amélie Daure had joined the cast of the film, with Vanessa Filho directing – her feature directorial debut – from a screenplay she wrote alongside Diastéme. Carole Lambert and Marc Missonnier produced the film, under their Windy Productions and Moana Films banner, respectively.

=== Filming ===
Principal photography began on 7 October 2017 and wrapped on 22 December 2017. Filming took place in Southeastern France, in La Seyne-sur-Mer, Bouches-du-Rhône, Var, and the French Riviera.

== Release ==
It was selected to compete in the Un Certain Regard section at the 2018 Cannes Film Festival. It was released theatrically in France by Mars Distribution on 23 May 2018.

== Reception ==
On review aggregator website Rotten Tomatoes, the film holds an approval rating of 36%, based on 14 reviews, and an average rating of 4.7/10.
