= Josyane Savigneau =

French journalist

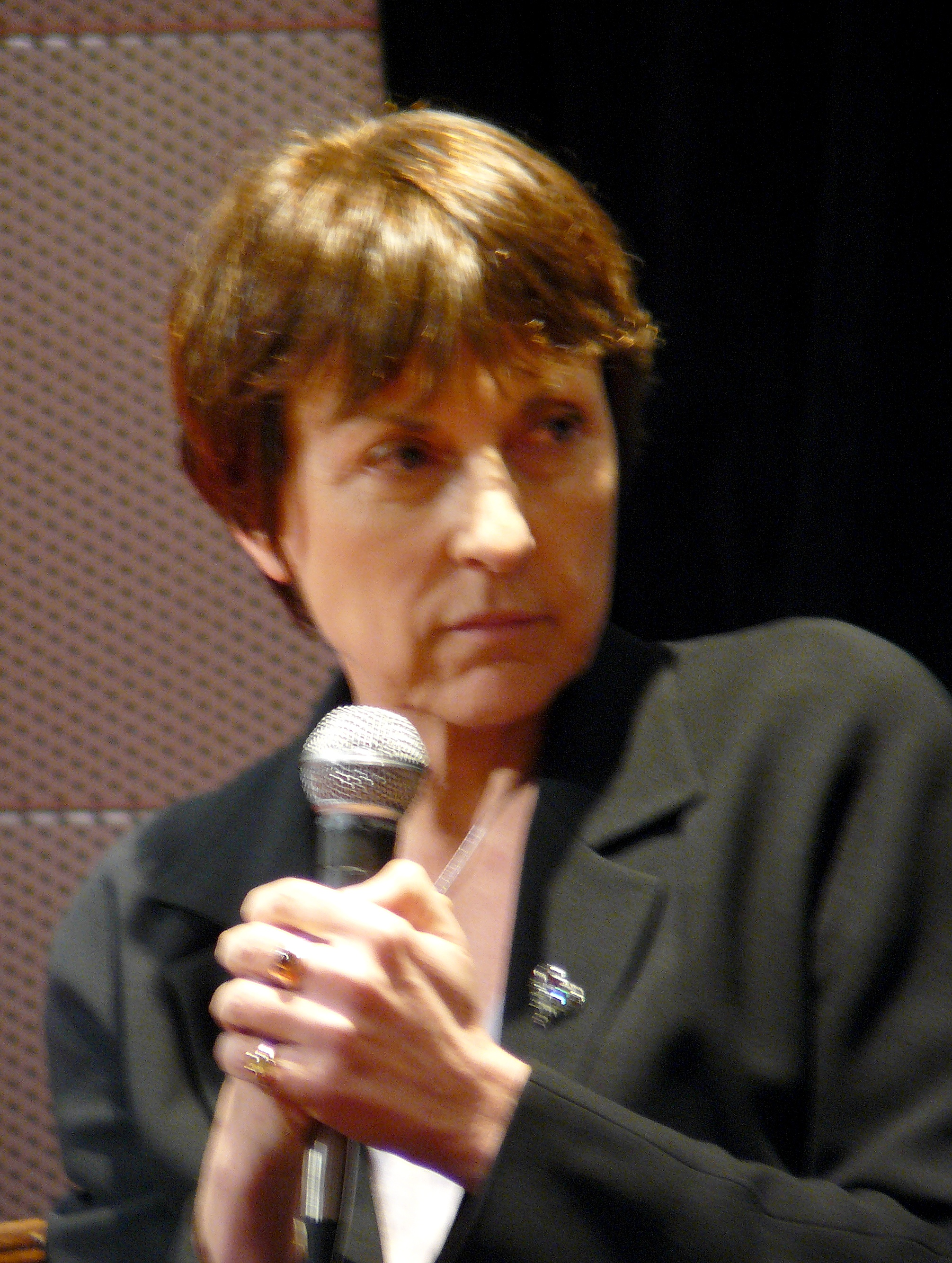
Josyane Savigneau

Josyane Savigneau (born 14 July 1951) is a French journalist and writer for Le Monde.

== Biography ==
Savigneau was born in Châtellerault, France.

She became editor-in-chief of Le Monde des Livres, editorial subdivision of Le Monde (2005).

She has written three biographies – on Marguerite Yourcenar, Carson McCullers, and Juliette Gréco – as well as an auto-biography.

In 2010 she came out in support of Gabriel Matzneff who received backlash for paedophile writings depicting his sexual relations with adolescents and children. His book entitled The Under 16s and other works gave graphic descriptions and mentioned children as young as eight, and Savigneau dismissed the scandal as a “witch-hunt”. In an interview she said “I saw him as a man who liked young women,” she said.

== Bibliography ==
- Marguerite Yourcenar, l'invention d'une vie, Gallimard/Folio, 1993, ISBN 2-07-038738-0
- Carson McCullers, un cœur de jeune fille, Stock, 1995, ISBN 978-2-253-14109-9
- Juliette Gréco : hommage photographique, Actes Sud, 1998, ISBN 978-2-7427-2059-0
- Un point de côté, Stock, 2008, ISBN 978-2-234-05489-9
