= René Schérer =

French philosopher (1922–2023)

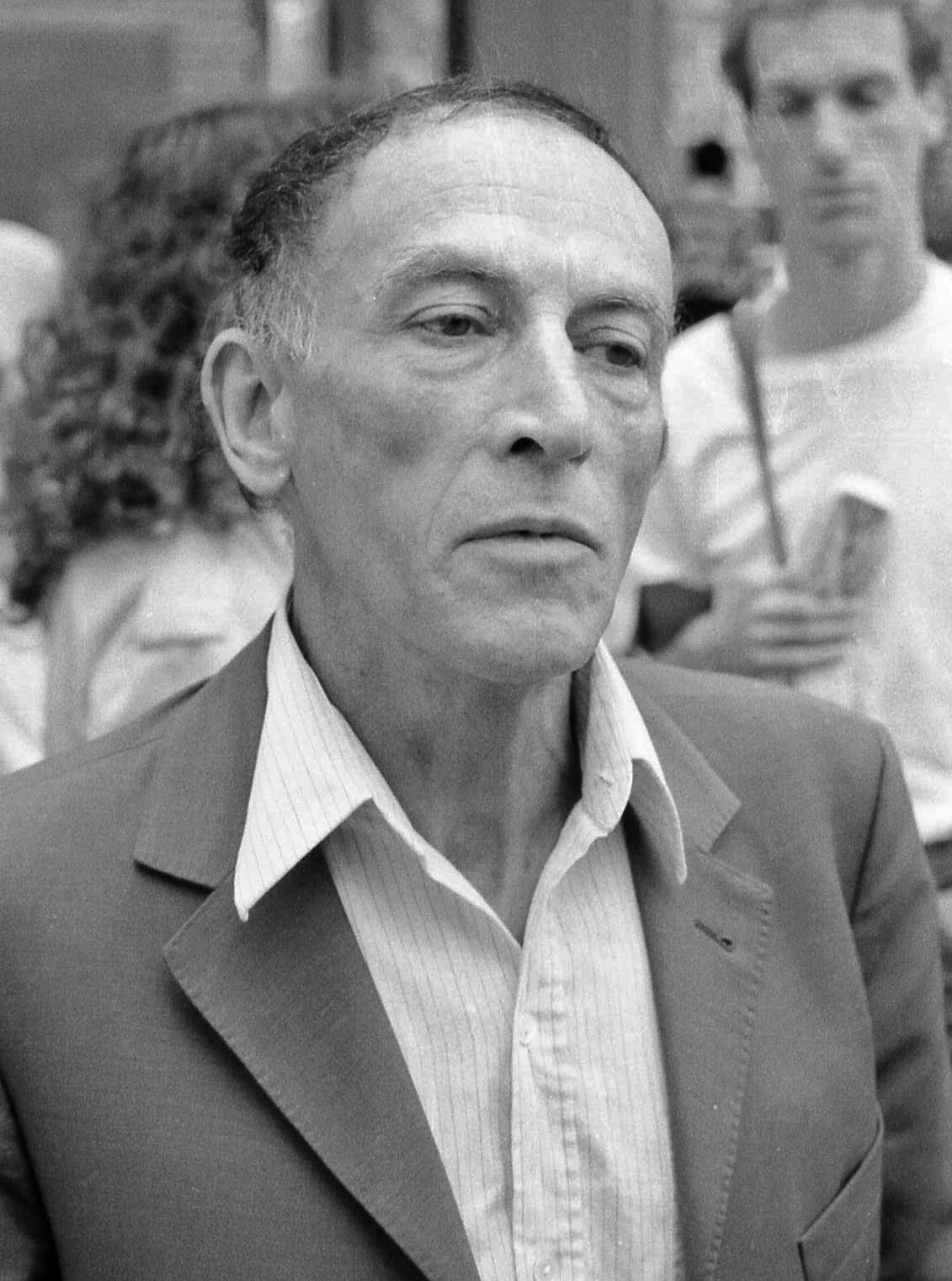
Schérer in 1983

René Schérer (25 November 1922 – 1 February 2023) was a French philosopher and professor emeritus of philosophy at the University of Paris VIII.

== Biography ==
Schérer was born in Tulle on 25 November 1922. He is the younger brother of filmmaker Éric Rohmer (1920–2010). He was Guy Hocquenghem's teacher and lover, with whom he co-wrote two books. In 2007, then aged 85, he commented on the history of his life and his work in an interview with Geoffroy de Lagasnerie: After all: interviews on an intellectual life, published by Cartouche.

Schérer died in Châtillon, Hauts-de-Seine on 1 February 2023, at the age of 100.

== Books ==
- Husserl, sa vie, son œuvre (avec Arion Lothar Kelkel), Paris, PUF, 1964, coll. « Philosophes »
- Structure et fondement de la communication humaine, Paris, SEDES, 1966
- La Phénoménologie des « Recherches logiques » de Husserl, Paris, PUF, 1967
- Charles Fourier ou la Contestation globale, Paris, Seghers, 1970; réédition Paris, Séguier, 1996
- Philosophies de la communication, SEES, 1971
- Heidegger ou l'expérience de la pensée (avec Arion Lothar Kelkel), Paris, Seghers, 1973
- Émile perverti ou Des rapports entre l'éducation et la sexualité, Paris, Laffont, 1974; rééd. Désordres-Laurence Viallet, 2006
- Co-Ire : album systématique de l'enfance (avec Guy Hocquenghem), revue Recherches, No. 22, 1976
- Le Corps interdit (en collaboration avec Georges Lapassade), E.S.F., 1977
- Une érotique puérile, Paris, Galilée, 1978
- L'Emprise. Des enfants entre nous, Paris, Hachette, 1979
- L'Âme atomique. Pour une esthétique d'ère nucléaire (avec Guy Hocquenghem), Paris, Albin Michel, 1986
- Pari sur l'impossible. Études fouriéristes, Saint-Denis, Presses universitaires de Vincennes, 1989
- Zeus hospitalier. Éloge de l'hospitalité, Paris, Armand Colin, 1993; rééd., Paris, La Table ronde, 2005
- Utopies nomades. En attendant 2002, Paris, Séguier, 1998; rééd., Les presses du réel, 2009
- Regards sur Deleuze, Paris, Kimé, 1998
- Un parcours critique : 1957–2000, Paris, Kimé, 2000
- L'Écosophie de Charles Fourier, Paris, Economica, 2001
- Enfantines, Paris, Anthropos, 2002
- Hospitalités, Paris, Anthropos, 2004
- Passages pasoliniens (avec Giorgio Passerone), Villeneuve-d'Ascq, Presses universitaires du Septentrion, 2006
- Après tout. Entretiens sur une vie intellectuelle (avec Geoffroy de Lagasnerie), Paris, Cartouche, 2007
- Pour un nouvel anarchisme, Paris, Cartouche, 2008
- Nourritures anarchistes. L'anarchisme explosé, Paris, Hermann, 2009
- Petit alphabet impertinent, Paris, Hermann, coll. « Hermann Philosophie », 2014
- En quête de réel. Réflexions sur le droit de punir, le fouriérisme et quelques autres thèmes – Entretien avec Tony Ferri, Paris, L'Harmattan, 2014
- Fouriériste aujourd'hui, suivi de Études et témoignages, sous la dir. de Yannick Beaubatie, Tulle, Éditions Mille Sources, 2017

=== Editions ===
- Edmund Husserl, Recherches logiques (traduction et présentation, avec Hubert Elie et Ariel Lothar Kelkel), Paris, PUF, 4 vol., 1958–1963
- Charles Fourier, Charles Fourier, l'attraction passionnée (choix de textes et présentation), Paris, J.-J. Pauvert, 1967
- Charles Fourier, L'ordre subversif. Trois textes sur la civilisation (préface de René Schérer, postface de Jean Goret), Paris, Aubier, 1972
- Fous d'enfance : qui a peur des pédophiles ? (avec plusieurs contributeurs dont Jean Danet, Luc Rosenzweig, André Dumargue, Bernard Faucon, Jean-Luc Hennig, Guy Hocquenghem, Gabriel Matzneff, Jean-Jacques Passay, Gilbert Villerot), Revue Recherches, n° 37, 1979
- Guy Hocquenghem, L'Amphithéâtre des morts, mémoires anticipées (postface), Éditions Gallimard, 1994 (posthume)
- Gabriel Tarde, Fragments d'histoire future (préface), Paris, Séguier, 1998
- Gabriel Tarde, La Logique sociale (préface), Le Plessis-Robinson, Institut Synthélabo pour le progrès de la connaissance, 1999, coll. « Les Empêcheurs de penser en rond »
- Charles Fourier, Vers une enfance majeure, textes sur l'éducation réunis et présentés par René Schérer, Paris, La Fabrique, 2006
- Guy Hocquenghem, La Beauté du métis : réflexions d'un francophobe, Paris, Ramsay, 1979, réédité en 2015 par les éditions Serge Safran, avec une préface de René Schérer
- Guy Hocquenghem, Race d'Ep ! : un siècle d'images de l'homosexualité, 1979, réédité, en 2018, par les Éditions la Tempête, avec une préface de René Schérer
