= Vanessa Filho =

French film director and screenwriter

- Born: 1980 (age 45–46); France
- Occupations: Film director; screenwriter
- Years active: 2001–present

Vanessa Filho (born 1980) is a French film director and screenwriter. She has written and directed the feature films Angel Face (2018) and Consent (2023). In 2024, she was nominated for the César Award for Best Adaptation for Consent.

== Early life ==
Filho was born in 1980. Her father was a commercial director and her mother was a literature teacher. She became fascinated with cinema at the age of 13 when she watched Krzysztof Kieślowski's Three Colours: Blue (1993).

== Career ==
In 2001, Filho directed her first medium-length film, Primitifs. She later directed several music videos and launched her own musical career as part of the female duo Smoking Smoking.

Her feature directorial debut, Angel Face, starring Marion Cotillard, premiered at the 2018 Cannes Film Festival in the Un Certain Regard section.

Filho's second feature film, Consent, based on Vanessa Springora's #MeToo bestseller Le Consentement, was released in 2023 and became a box office hit in France, and Filho was nominated for the 2024 César Awards for Best Adaptation.

On 23 August 2022, it was announced that Filho will direct the English and French-language period thriller Trespassers, starring Vanessa Paradis and Nina Hoss.

== Filmography ==
Year	Title	Notes
2001	Primitifs	Medium-length film
2007	Be a Good Girl	Short film
2018	Angel Face	
2023	Consent	

== Accolades ==
Year	Award / Festival	Category	Work	Result	Ref.
2018	Cannes Film Festival	Un Certain Regard Award	Angel Face	Nominated	
2018	Camerimage	Best Directorial Debut	Angel Face	Nominated	
2024	Paris Film Critics Association Awards	Best Adapted Screenplay	Consent	Nominated	
2024	César Awards	Best Adaptation	Consent	Nominated	
