= Next Episode (novel) =

1965 novel by Hubert Aquin

First edition (publ. Le Cercle Du Livre De France, Ottawa, 1965)

Next Episode (French: Prochain épisode) is the debut novel by French Canadian author Hubert Aquin, published in 1965. The novel was translated by Penny Williams in 1967, and again in 2001 by Sheila Fischman.

== Plot summary ==
The narrator, like Aquin himself, turns his adventures into a spy thriller to while away the time he is forced to spend in the psychiatric ward of a Montreal prison, where he is awaiting a trial for an unspecified revolutionary crime.

== Perspective ==
- Narrated in first person by unnamed narrator

== Significance ==
- Served as a response to suggestions of cultural fatigue among French Canadian artists

== Recognition ==
Prochain épisode (in its English translation by Sheila Fischman, Next Episode) was selected for the 2003 edition of CBC Radio's Canada Reads competition, where it was championed by journalist Denise Bombardier. It was the winning title.
