= Vanessa Springora =

French writer and publisher (born 1972)

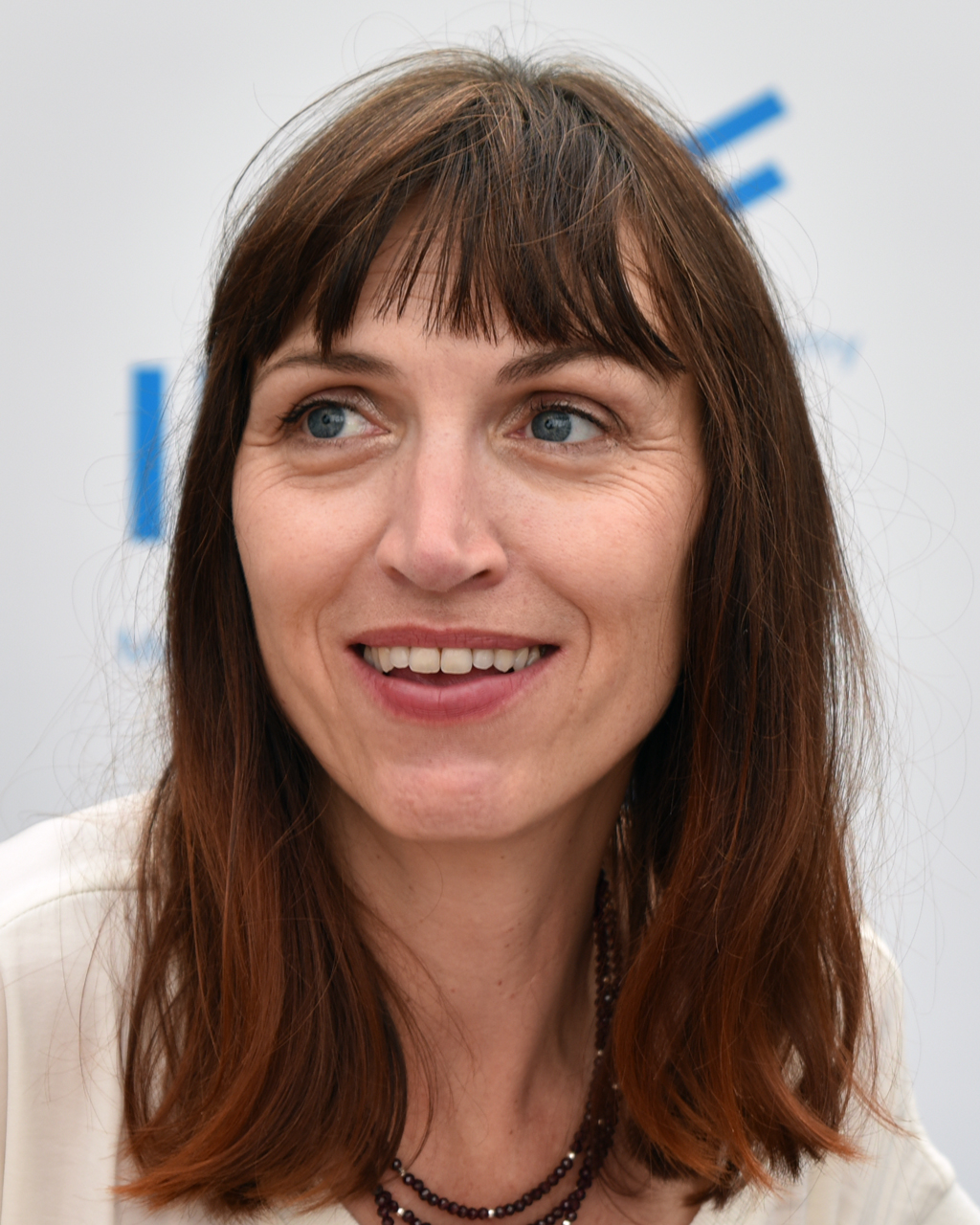
- Vanessa Springora (2022)
- Born: 16 March 1972 (age 54); Paris, France
- Education: La Sorbonne
- Occupations: Publisher, writer, film director
- Notable work: Consent

Vanessa Springora (born 16 March 1972 (Note: Springora describes in Consent a coincidence between her date of birth and the beginning of Matzneff's novel Nous n'irons plus au Luxembourg, which she bought and read not long after they met.)) is a French publisher, writer and film director. She is the author of the memoir Consent, describing sexual abuse she experienced beginning at age 14 from the pedophile Gabriel Matzneff, then 49. The book became a bestseller and prompted changes to the French age of consent.

== Early life ==
Born and raised in Paris by her mother, Springora studied at the collège Jacques-Prévert, and later the lycée Fénelon in Paris, before taking a Diplôme d'études approfondies in Modern Literature at the Sorbonne University.

== Career ==
In 2003 Springora began working at the Institut national de l'audiovisuel as a writer and director, before joining the publisher Éditions Julliard in 2006 as an editorial assistant. She has written and directed for the screen, with titles including the film Dérive (2006) and the television series Quotidien (2016). In 2019, she was appointed head of Éditions Julliard.

=== Consent ===
In early January 2020, Springora published Le Consentement (French: Consent), a memoir in which she describes how, from the age of 14, she was groomed and sexually abused by the author Gabriel Matzneff, who was then 49. In the memoir, she describes herself as a vulnerable teenager of divorced parents who first met Matzneff when she was 13. The book describes how Matzneff actively pursued her by writing her letters, waiting for her outside her school, and following her in the street. Springora's memoir met with critical and commercial success, quickly becoming a bestseller. It also sent shockwaves through the French publishing world, since it highlighted a history of pedophilia and sex tourism that Matzneff has discussed and written about in his own books for decades. Matzneff made no secret of his sexual activities. In 1975, he appeared on Apostrophes to promote his essay Les moins de seize ans (The Under 16s), in which he discussed sexual relations with people under the age of 16. He later wrote an anonymised account of his relationship with Springora in the book La Prunelle de mes yeux (French: The Apple of my Eyes) (Gallimard, 1995).

The fallout was significant. Matzneff's three publishers all ceased working with him; a lifetime stipend was revoked; and the French government announced it would implement an age of consent of 15. The scandal and the ongoing criminal prosecution also turned a spotlight onto a number of high-profile figures in French society who supported and socialised with Matzneff (including François Mitterrand, Jean-Marie Le Pen, the fashion designer Yves Saint Laurent and his partner Pierre Bergé). The French politician Christophe Girard claimed to have been unaware of Matzneff's pedophilia, despite a long association with the writer. Following public pressure, Girard resigned as deputy mayor of Paris in July 2020.

Le Consentement was published in English as Consent (translated by Natasha Lehrer) by HarperVia in February 2021. In The New York Times, critic Parul Sehgal praised the memoir and the translation, and noted the impact the book was having: "By every conceivable metric, her book is a triumph."

In September 2021, Editis announced that Springora was leaving the management of Éditions Julliard.

In 2023, Consent was adapted into a film of the same name directed by Vanessa Filho, starring Kim Higelin as Springora and Jean-Paul Rouve as Matzneff.
