= François Aquin =

Canadian politician

Member of the National Assembly of Quebec for Dorion
- In office 1966–1969
- Preceded by: Constituency established (1965)
- Succeeded by: Mario Beaulieu

Personal details
- Born: March 6, 1929 Montreal, Quebec
- Died: November 23, 2017 (aged 88) Laval, Quebec
- Party: Quebec Liberal Party (former); Independent (later)
- Relations: Hubert Aquin (cousin)

François Aquin (French pronunciation: [fʁɑ̃swa akɛ̃]; March 6, 1929 – November 23, 2017) was a Canadian politician from Quebec, Canada.

== Background ==
Aquin was an attorney. He was born on March 6, 1929, in Montreal and died on November 23, 2017, in Montreal. He was a cousin of writer Hubert Aquin.

== Liberal Activist ==
Early on, Aquin was a supporter of the Liberal Party of Quebec. He was President of the party's Youth Commission from 1959 to 1963 and President of the party from 1963 to 1964.

== Member of the legislature ==
Aquin won a seat to the Legislative Assembly of Quebec in 1966 in the district of Dorion. In the aftermath of French President Charles de Gaulle's visit to Canada, Aquin declared himself in favor of the political independence of Quebec and left his party to sit as an independent.

With René Lévesque and other supporters, he co-founded the Mouvement Souveraineté–Association in April 1968, which officially became the Parti Québécois in October of that same year. In November 1968 though, Aquin resigned his seat.
