= Leo Bersani =

American literary theorist (1931–2022)

- Born: April 16, 1931; The Bronx, New York City, U.S.
- Died: February 20, 2022 (aged 90); Peoria, Arizona, U.S.
- Education: Harvard University (BA, Romance languages); Harvard University (PhD, Comparative literature)
- Occupations: Academic, literary critic
- Employers: Wellesley College; Rutgers University; University of California, Berkeley
- Known for: Essay "Is the Rectum a Grave?"; book Homos
- Notable work: Marcel Proust: The Fictions of Life and of Art (1965); The Culture of Redemption (1990); Homos (1995); Is the Rectum a Grave? and Other Essays (2010)
- Spouse: Sam Geraci (m. 2014)
- Awards: Fellow, American Academy of Arts and Sciences (1992)

Leo Bersani (April 16, 1931 – February 20, 2022) was an American academic, known for his contributions to French literary criticism and queer theory. He was known for his 1987 essay "Is the Rectum a Grave?" and his 1995 book Homos.

Bersani was born in the Bronx, New York City. He studied at Harvard University, graduating in 1952 with a bachelor's in Romance languages, and with a Ph.D. in comparative literature in 1958. He taught at Wellesley College and Rutgers University before joining University of California, Berkeley in 1972, where he remained for the rest of his career, assuming emeritus status in 1996. He was elected a Fellow of the American Academy of Arts and Sciences in 1992. He married his partner, Sam Geraci, in 2014, and died at a care facility under the care of Hospice in Peoria, Arizona, on February 20, 2022, at the age of 90 with Geraci at his side.

== Bibliography ==
- Marcel Proust: The Fictions of Life and of Art (Oxford Univ. Press, 1965)
- Balzac to Beckett (Oxford Univ. Press, 1970)
- A Future for Astyanax (Little, Brown, 1976)
- Baudelaire and Freud (Univ. California Press, 1977)
- The Death of Stéphane Mallarmé (Cambridge Univ. Press, 1982)
- The Forms of Violence (with Ulysses Dutoit, Schocken Books, N.Y., 1985)
- The Freudian Body: Psychoanalysis and Art (Columbia University Press, 1986)
- The Culture of Redemption (Harvard Univ. Press, 1990)
- Arts of Impoverishment: Beckett, Rothko and Resnais (with Ulysse Dutoit, Harvard Univ. Press, 1993);
- Homos (Harvard Univ. Press, 1995)
- Caravaggio's Secrets (with Ulysse Dutoit, MIT Press, 1998)
- Caravaggio (with Ulysse Dutoit, British Film Institute, 1999)
- Forming Couples: Godard's Contempt (with Ulysse Dutoit, Legenda/European Humanities Research Centre, 2003)
- Forms of Being: Cinema, Aesthetics, Subjectivity (with Ulysse Dutoit, British Film Institute, 2004)
- Intimacies (with Adam Phillips, Univ. Chicago Press, 2008)
- Is the Rectum a Grave? and Other Essays (Univ. Chicago Press, 2010) — contains "Is the Rectum a Grave?" (originally published, 1987)
- Thoughts and Things (Univ. Chicago Press, 2015)
- Receptive Bodies (Univ. Chicago Press, 2018)
