= Hubert Aquin =

Quebec novelist and intellectual (1929–1977)

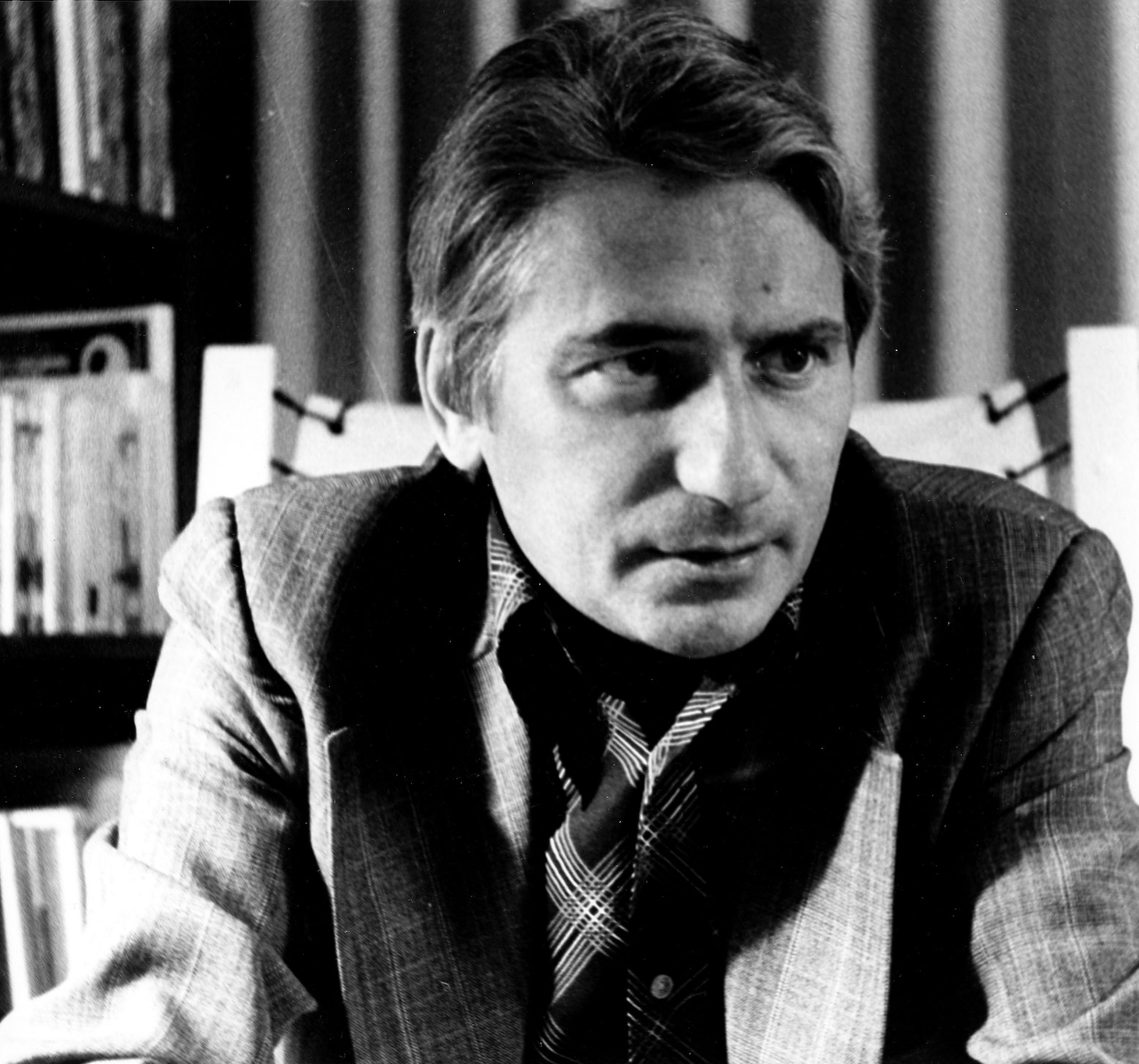
- Aquin in 1976
- Born: 24 October 1929; Montreal, Quebec
- Died: 15 March 1977 (aged 47); Montreal, Quebec
- Occupations: Novelist; Essayist
- Spouse: Thérèse Larouche (1955–1975)
- Partner: Andrée Yanacopoulo (1963–1977)
- Children: Philippe, Stéphane, Emmanuel
- Relatives: François Aquin (cousin)
- Writing career
- Notable works: "The Cultural Fatigue of French Canada" (1962); Next Episode (1965); Blackout (1968); The Antiphonary (1969); Hamlet's Twin (1974)
- Notable awards: Governor General's Awards (not accepted); Prix de la province de Québec; Prix Athanase-David

Hubert Aquin (French pronunciation: [ybɛʁ akɛ̃]; 24 October 1929 – 15 March 1977) was a Quebec writer, filmmaker and intellectual. He is particularly known for his novel Next Episode. He is also an important figure in the history of the Quebec independence movement, to which he contributed both as an activist and as an essayist. Tempted by suicide for a great part of his existence, he ended his life in 1977 in the gardens of Villa Maria College.

== Biography ==
=== Genealogy ===
Hubert Aquin was born on 24 October 1929, at 4037 St-André Street, in Montreal. His family is mainly of French Canadian origin, but also of Irish origin through his great-grandmother, Helen McCardon. He is the son of a Montreal sporting goods merchant. He had three sons: Philippe and Stéphane, with his wife Thérèse Larouche, and Emmanuel with Andrée Yanacopoulo. François Aquin, his cousin, was elected as a Liberal Party of Quebec MLA in 1966, before leaving the party in 1967 and becoming an independent MLA, as he disagreed with the disapproval of his party leader Jean Lesage regarding De Gaulle's Vive le Québec libre! speech. Hubert Aquin is also the brother of engineer Richard Aquin with whom he tried to organize an auto racing Grand Prix in Montreal in the 1960s.

=== Studies ===
Aquin entered the Collège Sainte-Marie, a Jesuit school, in September 1946 and left in June 1948. He obtained remarkable results there, according to Guylaine Massoutre. It was there that he met Louis-Georges Carrier, who would be a great friend of Aquin all his life. He also did theatre there, which helped him to overcome his great shyness as a child. He enrolled in the philosophy faculty of Université de Montréal in September 1948, and received a degree in 1951, at the age of 21. During his time at Université de Montréal, he directed the student newspaper Le Quartier latin. He was then offered a job as a teacher at the university, but he turned it down, preferring to prepare for a career in journalism. He then went to study at the Institut d'études politiques de Paris from 1951 to 1954. According to Aquin, every trip to Europe is a moment of "emotional shock" for him, a theme that would later recur in his work.

=== Professional life ===
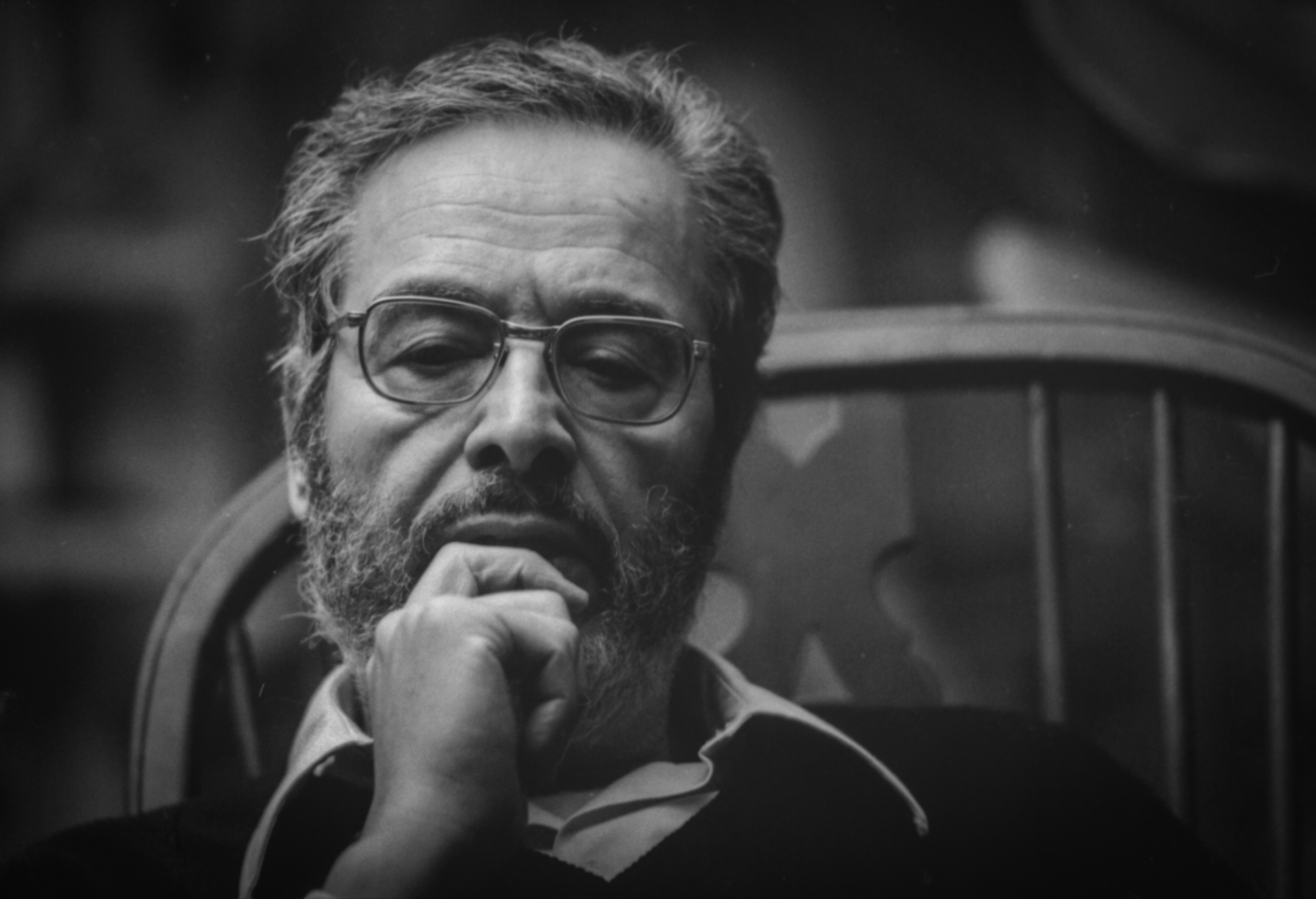
As part of his professional activities, Aquin formed a friendship with Albert Memmi, a Tunisian decolonization intellectual.

Upon his return to Montreal in 1954, he was hired as a director and scriptwriter for Radio-Canada (from 1954 to 1959). Then, from 1959 to 1963, he was a director, producer and screenwriter at the National Film Board (NFB). For the NFB, he notably worked on the film The Hour of Independence (À l'heure de la décolonisation), directed by Monique Fortier, which led Aquin to interview in 1962 figures of decolonization such as Albert Memmi (with whom he formed a friendship), Messali Hadj, Octave Mannoni and Olympe Bhêly-Quenum. Decolonization would be a major influence on his political writings. Then, during the same stay in Europe, he was received for three days by Georges Simenon, of whom he was a great reader. Aquin then made a film on Simenon, which never saw the light of day.

Aquin worked at the Montreal Stock Exchange from 1960 to 1964. In 1966, based on an already written script, Aquin wrote the script for the film Faux bond, in which he eventually played the main role, after some hesitation. The images from the film will be used to illustrate several passages of the NFB documentary Deux épisodes dans la vie d'Hubert Aquin by Jacques Godbout. In 1967, he began teaching literature at Collège Sainte-Marie. In 1969, he was hired by the Université du Québec à Montréal (UQAM), but he resigned in 1970, saying he disagreed with the policy of Rector Léo A. Dorais. Carleton University, in Ottawa, hired him in 1974 as a visiting professor, but did not renew his contract.

In 1975, Aquin was appointed literary director of Éditions La Presse. He lost his job in August 1976: he was fired following the publication of an open letter denouncing the cultural policies of Éditions La Presse towards Quebec works. He then accused his superior officer, Roger Lemelin, of "colonizing Quebec from the inside". In 1976, Aquin returned to UQAM for a teaching position, but only taught there for one month due to a strike. After the victory of the Parti Québécois in 1976, Aquin hoped to obtain a position within the government, such as Deputy Minister of Cultural Affairs, which did not come to fruition.

=== Personal life ===
In 1958, Aquin discovered car racing, a passion that led him to work towards holding an auto racing Grand Prix on Île Sainte-Hélène. To do this, he founded his own car racing company in 1960, "Le Grand Prix de Montréal Inc.". He also included car racing in a film he made in 1961, Le Sport et les Hommes (on which Roland Barthes collaborated), and the novel Next Episode. He dreamed of becoming a driver, but considered himself too old to think about it seriously. An auto racing Grand Prix in Montreal would come to exist from 1978 onward.

It was at Radio-Canada that he met his future wife, Thérèse Larouche, a script girl for his friend Louis-Georges Carrier. He married her in 1955. In 1963, he met Andrée Yanacopoulo. Born in Tunis to a half-Sicilian, half-Greek father and a French mother, Yanacopoulo graduated in medicine and sociology. She then prepared a thesis on suicide and researched "Depression among French Canadians in Montreal", supervised by Guy Rocher, a sociologist, and Camille Laurin, a psychiatrist and future pro-independence minister under René Lévesque. Yanacopoulo would be Aquin's lover until his death. As for his wife Thérèse Larouche, they began divorce proceedings in 1966. The seizures of Aquin's income that followed contributed to his financial troubles.

=== Political involvement ===
The Royal Canadian Mounted Police visited his office in 1958. They confiscated works by authors such as Georg Wilhelm Friedrich Hegel, Karl Marx and Friedrich Engels. A secret trial in Ottawa followed, lasting three or four days. He was questioned about his friendships during his university years, presumably because they were trying to track down communist activists. According to Guylaine Massoutre, these events "precipitated his political awareness and gave rise to his adherence to separatist ideology". Having become an activist for Quebec independence, he was an executive member of the Rassemblement pour l'indépendance nationale (RIN) from 1960 to 1968. In 1962, in the magazine Liberté, he published his most famous political text, "The Cultural Fatigue of French Canada" ("La fatigue culturelle du Canada français"), responding to an article published in Cité libre by Pierre Elliott Trudeau on the subject of independence: La nouvelle trahison des clercs.

On 19 June 1964, he publicly announced in a letter to the newspapers Le Devoir and Montréal-Matin that he was going "undercover" and becoming "commander of the Special Organization" with the aim of joining forces with the Front de libération du Québec. He then took refuge at Louis-Georges Carrier's dwelling, then at Andrée Yanacopoulo's. He meets Dr. Pierre Lefebvre, a psychiatrist and contributor to Parti pris, who, on 26 June, concludes that immediate treatment is necessary due to a "nervous breakdown". On 29 June, a press release announces that the Special Organization will take action on the following 1 July. On 5 July, Aquin is arrested by a plainclothes police officer in a stolen car, in possession of a revolver, in a parking lot behind the Saint Joseph's Oratory.

During his incarceration, he declares that his profession is: "revolutionary". Two charges were brought against him: "theft and possession of stolen goods" and "possession of an offensive weapon for a dangerous purpose". He was then interned for two months in a psychiatric hospital, the Albert-Prévost Institute, in the maximum security wing. It was during this stay that he began writing his novel Next Episode, which tells the story of an imprisoned revolutionary. The verdict of the trial, deferred, only arrived in 1966. Aquin was then acquitted because of contradictory testimonies given about his mental health. His pistol was however confiscated.

Around May 1966, Aquin left Quebec to live in Switzerland. There he became interested in the "Jura question", and tried to make contact with autonomists in the Bernese Jura. On 29 August, he was questioned by the police of the canton of Vaud about his membership in the RIN, and his imprisonment. He was then suspected of collusion with the Front de libération jurassien. On 19 November, on behalf of the Federal Foreigners Police, the canton of Vaud refused him a residence permit that he needed to live in Nyon. He was told that he had to leave Switzerland before 15 January 1967, under the pretext of "foreign overpopulation". Aquin then moved to Paris, and remained there until 21 March 1967. He then returned to Montreal. During 1969, he denounced the decision to dissolve the RIN in favor of René Lévesque's Mouvement Souveraineté-Association, and left the party.

=== Literary production ===
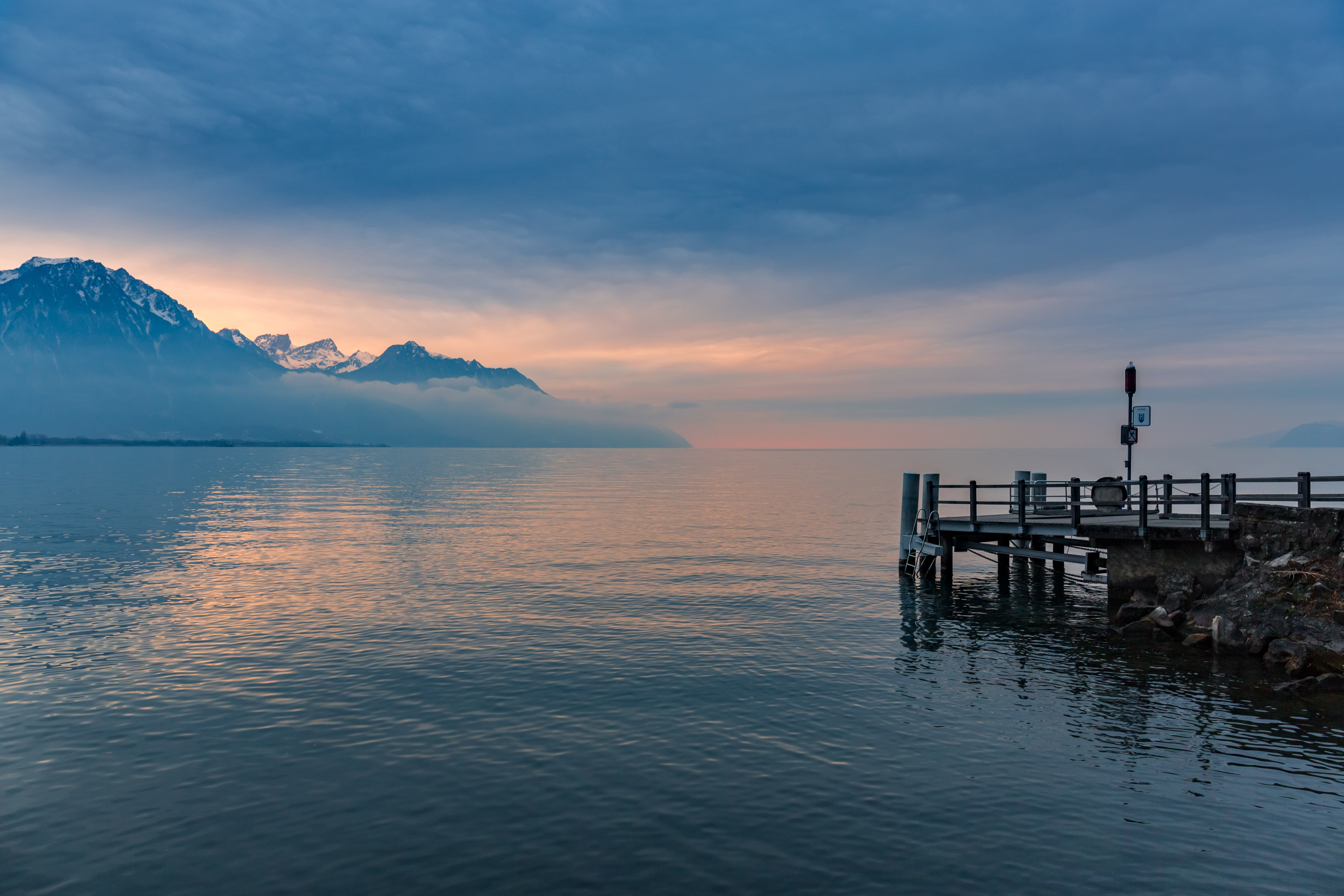
The novel Next Episode takes place in part near Lake Geneva, in Switzerland.

In 1952, Aquin wrote Les Rédempteurs, a work that remained unpublished until 1959. His texts appeared in various magazines, starting in 1959, including in Parti pris, Le Magazine Maclean, Voix et images du pays, Écrits du Canada français and the literary magazine Liberté, of which he was director from 1961 to 1962. Next Episode, his best-known novel, was published in 1965 in Montreal, then in 1966 in Paris and translated into English in 1967 in Toronto. In Quebec, it was a success in terms of sales and reviews. The first edition sold out in two and a half months, and, in Le Devoir, the literary critic Jean Éthier-Blais ended his article about the book by exclaiming: "We do not have to look any further. We have him, our great writer. My God, thank you. » In Paris, the critical reception was however more mixed. In 1969, he was the first Quebec writer to refuse the Governor General's Literary Award which was awarded to him for his novel Trou de mémoire, from 1968. Also in 1969, he published L'Antiphonaire which, like his subsequent novels (and unlike the two preceding ones), does not contain any explicit political reference. In 1971, he published Point de fuite. That year, he resigned from the editorial board of Liberté because, he said, the magazine had ignored the events of the October Crisis of 1970 in order to avoid losing funding from the Canada Council for the Arts. In 1974, Aquin published Neige noire, a modern version of Hamlet. At the end of his life, he planned to write Obombre, a work that would remain unfinished. His novel L'Invention de la mort, written around 1959 or 1960, was finally published posthumously in 1991.

=== Suicide ===
Suicide was an idea that haunted Aquin for many years, and he often joked about it with his friends. On 29 March 1971, he failed a suicide attempt in a room of the Queen Elizabeth Hotel by swallowing barbiturates. He was hospitalized at the Sacré-Cœur Hospital until 4 April. At the hotel, he had registered under the name of his character from his novel The Antiphonary, J. W. Forrestier. On 15 March 1977, he attempted suicide again, this time with a firearm in the gardens of the Villa Maria College in Montreal, leaving his partner Andrée Yanacopoulo a final note:

Today, 15 March 1977, I have no more reserves in me. I feel destroyed. I cannot rebuild myself and I do not want to rebuild myself. It is a choice. I feel peaceful, my act is positive, it is the act of a living person. Don't forget that I always knew that I would choose the moment, my life has come to an end. I have lived intensely, it is over.

— Hubert Aquin

== Legacy ==
=== Tributes ===
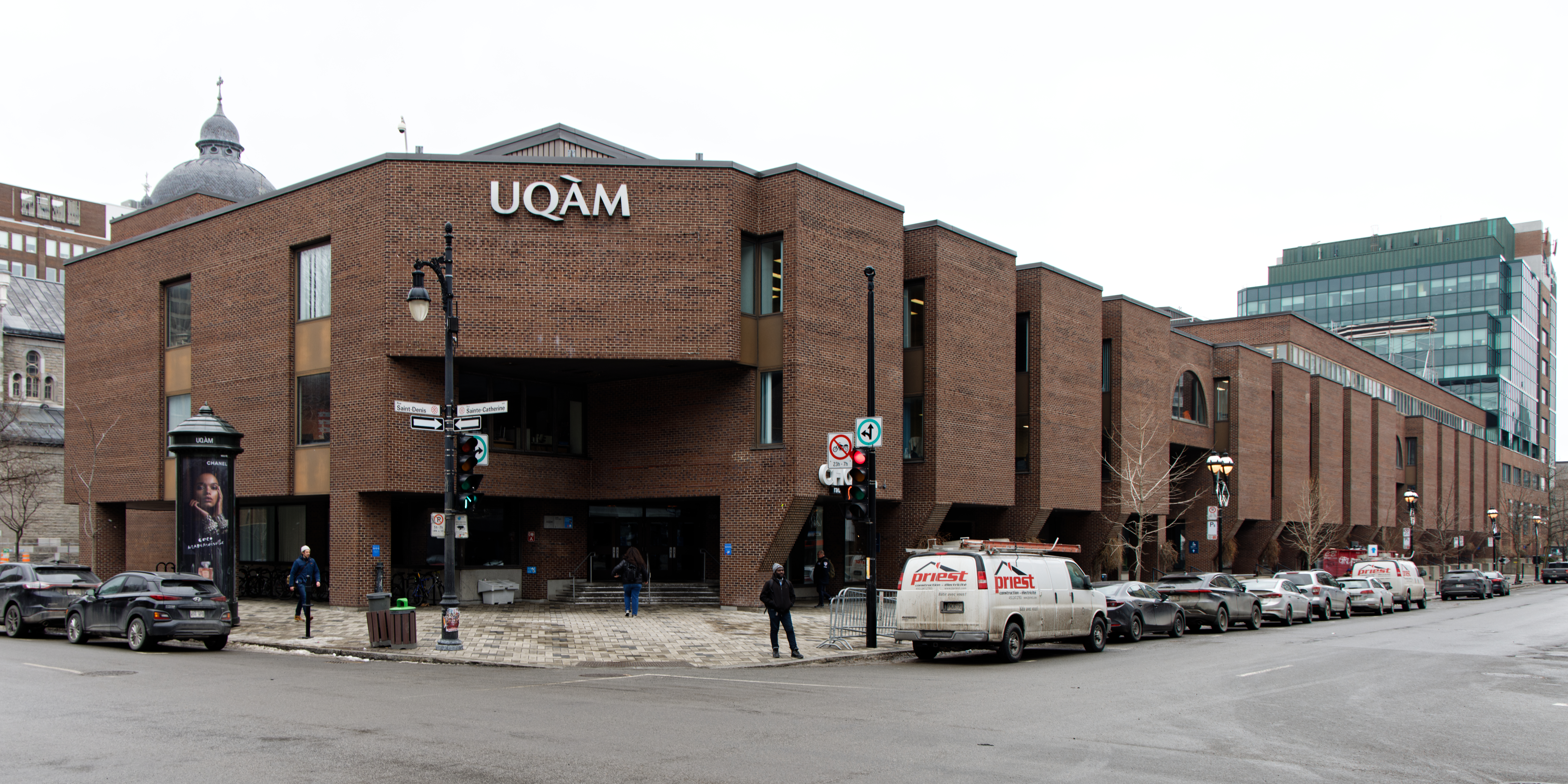
Le pavillon Hubert Aquin de l'Université du Québec à Montréal.

The Hubert-Aquin building at the Université du Québec à Montréal (built from 1975 to 1979) is named in his (posthumous) honour.

The Hubert Aquin archives are held at the Montreal archives centre of the Bibliothèque et Archives nationales du Québec.

In 1979, the Quebec writer and filmmaker Jacques Godbout made a documentary entitled Two episodes in the life of Hubert Aquin.

Hubert-Aquin Street was named in his honor in 1984 in Quebec City.

A notable work in English about Aquin is HA!: A Self-Murder Mystery (2003), an experiment in biography by Aquin's friend Gordon Sheppard.

=== Canada Reads ===
Regarded in English Canada as a classic of Canadian literature, Next Episode was chosen for the 2003 edition of CBC Radio's Canada Reads competition, where it was championed by journalist Denise Bombardier. It was the winning title, because of the deciding vote of future Prime Minister of Canada Justin Trudeau, who was also on the panel and voted against the book he was initially defending, The Colony of Unrequited Dreams by Wayne Johnston. Justin Trudeau is the son of former Prime Minister Pierre Elliott Trudeau, who Aquin was responding to with "La fatigue culturelle du Canada français".

== Bibliography ==
=== Novels ===
- Prochain épisode (1965). Prochain Episode, trans. Penny Williams (McClelland & Stewart, 1967); Next Episode, trans. Sheila Fischman (McClelland & Stewart, 2001).
- Trou de mémoire (1968). Blackout, trans. Alan Brown (Anansi, 1974).
- L'Antiphonaire (1969). The Antiphonary, trans. Alan Brown (Anansi, 1973).
- Point de fuite (1971)
- Neige noire (1974). Hamlet's Twin, trans. Sheila Fischman (McClelland & Stewart, 1979).
- L'Invention de la mort (written 1959; published 1991). The Invention of Death, trans. Joseph Jones (Quattro Books, 2013).

=== Essays ===
- Blocs erratiques : textes, 1948-1977 (Quinze, 1977). Compilation, including "La fatigue culturelle du Canada français".
- Writing Quebec: Selected Essays, ed. Anthony Purdy (University of Alberta Press, 1988)

== Filmography ==
=== Producer ===
- 1960: L'Exil en banlieue
- 1960: Les Grandes Religions
- 1960: Quatre enfants du monde
- 1961: Quatre instituteurs
- 1961: Le Temps des amours
- 1962: Jour après jour
- 1963: Trois pays, trois grand-mères
- 1963: Trois pays, trois apprentis
- 1963: Jour de mariage
- 1963: L'Homme vite

=== Director ===
- 1959: Le Sport et les hommes
- 1961: Le Temps des amours
- 1962: À Saint-Henri le cinq septembre
- 1962: Simenon voit la France / La France de Simenon (working titles of a documentary made by Hubert Aquin with Georges Simenon and his wife, Denyse Ouimet, but never edited)
- 1963: À l'heure de la décolonisation (documentary conceived and partially directed by Hubert Aquin, but completed by Monique Fortier, to whom the production is attributed)

=== Writer ===
- 1964: La Fin des étés

==== Actor ====
- 1966: Faux bond

== Awards and honours ==
- 1968: Governor General's Award for French-language fiction for Trou de mémoire. Aquin refused it for political reasons.
- 1970: Prix de la province de Québec for L'Antiphonaire
- 1973: Prix Athanase-David for 1972
- 1974: Prix littéraire de La Presse
- 1975: Grand prix littéraire de la ville de Montréal for Neige noire

== See also ==
- Canadian Grand Prix
