= Emmanuel Aquin =

Canadian writer

Emmanuel Aquin (French pronunciation: [emanɥɛl akɛ̃]; born 27 January 1968 in Montreal) is a Canadian novelist, screenwriter, editor, graphic artist, and illustrator. He is the son of Hubert Aquin and Andrée Yanacopoulo.

He has published 11 novels in French, writing in several genres.

He is also one of the co-founders of the Quebec publishing house Point de Fuite. He presently works as a screenwriter on television projects and as a writer of children's books, and is the designer of the award-winning board game D-Day Dice.
