= Guy Hocquenghem =

French writer (1946–1988)

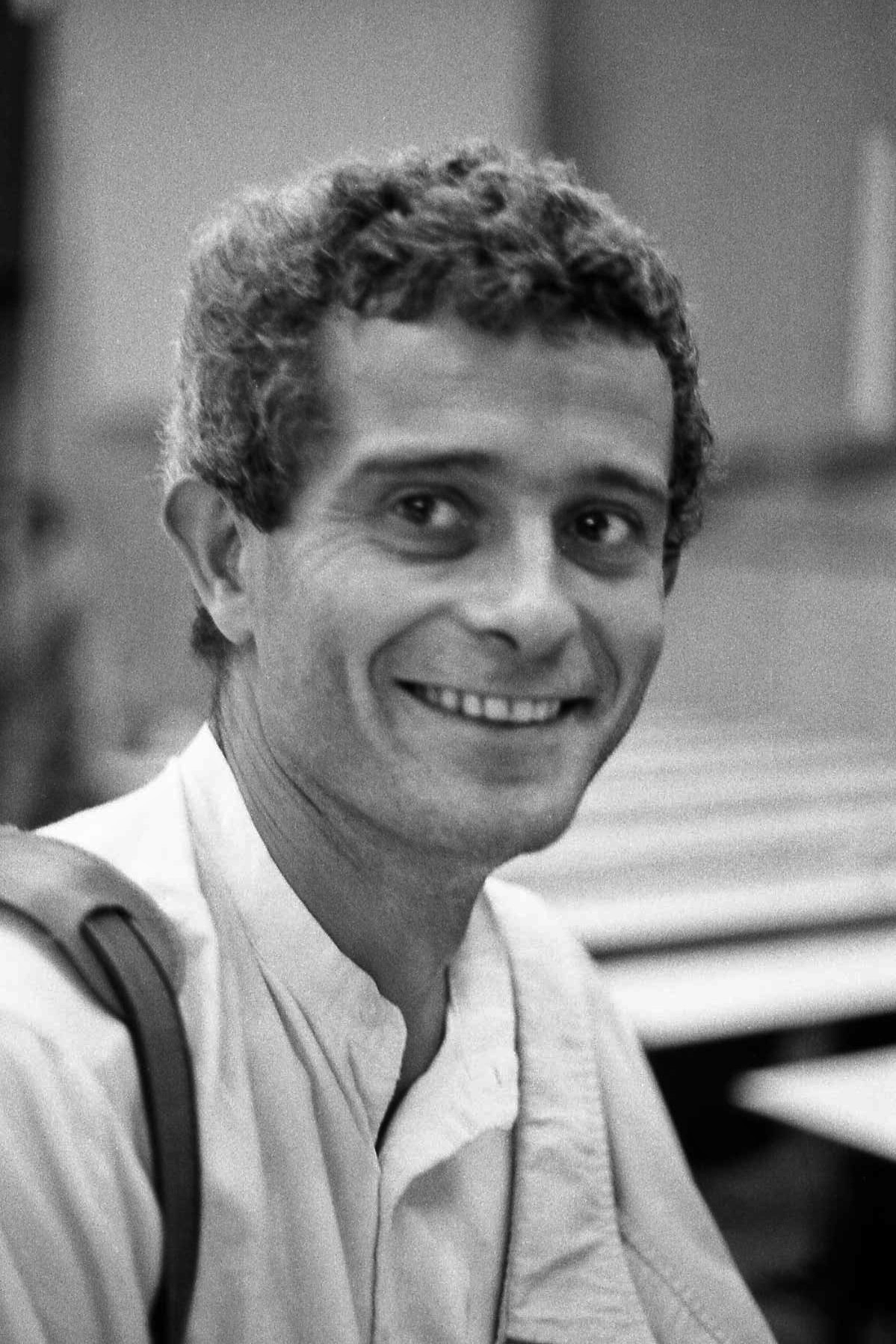
- Hocquenghem in 1983
- Born: 10 December 1946; Boulogne-Billancourt, France
- Died: 28 August 1988 (aged 41); Paris, France

Education
- Doctoral advisor: François Châtelet

Philosophical work
- Era: 20th-century philosophy
- Region: Western philosophy
- School: Continental philosophy, queer theory
- Institutions: Paris 8 University Vincennes
- Main interests: Sexuality, desire, gay liberation, political philosophy, psychoanalysis, capitalism, identity

Guy Hocquenghem (French: [okɛ̃ɡɛm]; 10 December 1946 – 28 August 1988) was a French writer, philosopher, and gay liberation theorist.

== Biography ==
Hocquenghem was born in the suburbs of Paris, France, and was educated at the Lycée Lakanal in Sceaux and the Ecole Normale Supérieure in Paris. At the age of 15, he began an affair with his high-school philosophy teacher, René Scherer. They remained lifelong friends. His participation in the May 1968 student rebellion in France formed his allegiance to the Communist Party, which later expelled him because of his homosexuality.

Hocquenghem taught philosophy at the Paris 8 University Vincennes and wrote numerous novels and works of theory. He was the staff writer for the French publication Libération. Hocquenghem was a prominent member of the Front homosexuel d'action révolutionnaire (FHAR), originally formed by lesbian and feminist activists who split from the Mouvement Homophile de France in 1971. With filmmaker Lionel Soukaz (b. 1953), Hocquenghem wrote and produced a documentary film about gay history, Race d'Ep! (1979), the last word of the title being a play on the word pédé, a French slur for gay men.

Though Hocquenghem had a significant impact on leftist thinking in France, his reputation has failed to grow to international prominence. Only two of his theoretical tracts, Homosexual Desire (1972) and L'Après-Mai des faunes (1974), and his first novel, L'Amour en relief (1982), have been translated into English. Although Race d'Ep! was shown at the Roxie Cinema in San Francisco in April 1980 and released in America as The Homosexual Century, like Hocquenghem, the film is virtually unknown.

== Career ==
Hocquenghem's Homosexual Desire (1972, English translation 1978) may be the first work of Queer Theory. Drawing on the theories of desiring-production developed by Gilles Deleuze and Félix Guattari in their Anti-Oedipus (1972), Hocquenghem critiqued the influential models of the psyche and sexual desire derived from the psychoanalysts Jacques Lacan and Sigmund Freud. The author also addressed the relation of capitalism to sexualities, the dynamics of desire, and the political effects of gay group-identities. Moreover, he repudiated the prospect of a new gay 'social organisation' of politics, along with the injunction to sacrifice oneself in the name of future generations. The sociologist Jeffrey Weeks's 1978 preface to the first English translation of Homosexual Desire situates the essay in relation to the various, mostly French, theories of subjectivity and desire surrounding and influencing Hocquenghem's thought. It was republished in French in 2000.

Additionally, Hocquenghem wrote the following works:

- L'Après-Mai des faunes (1974) is the second and untranslated queer-theoretical text.
- Co-ire, album systématique de l'enfance (Co-anger: systematic album of childhood) (1976) examines childhood sexuality from a Marxist perspective, co-written with professor René Schérer. It is rumored that Schérer and Hocquenghem had an affair in 1959, when the latter was 15.
- Fin de section (1976) is a short story collection.
- La Dérive homosexuelle (1977) is the third and untranslated queer-theoretical text.
- La Beauté du métis (1979) analyzed French anti-Arab feeling and homophobia.
- L'Amour en relief (Love in Relief) (1982, English translation 1985) is Hocquenghem's first and most famous novel. A blind Tunisian boy explores French society and discovers the ways in which pleasure can form a resistance to totalitarianism. The novel contextualizes homosexual desire as a resistance to white supremacy and racism.
- La Colère de l'agneau (The Wrath of the Lamb) (1985) is an experiment in millenarian and apocalyptic narrative, taking St. John the Evangelist as its subject.
- L'Âme atomique (The Atomic Heart) (1986) was written partly in response to Hocquenghem's deteriorating health, again in collaboration with Schérer. This work espouses a philosophy composed of dandyism, gnosticism, and epicureanism.
- Open letter to those who moved from Mao collars to Rotary wheels, Marseilles, Agone (1986) was republished in 2003 with a foreword by Serge Halimi. ISBN 2-7489-0005-7
- Eve (1987) is a narrative which combines the story of Genesis with a description of the changes in the body from AIDS-related symptoms, written as Hocquenghem's own body deteriorated.
- Voyages et aventures extraordinaires du Frère Angelo (1988) explores the mind of an Italian monk accompanying the conquistadors to the New World.

== The Screwball Asses ==
The Screwball Asses (Les Culs Énergumènes) is an essay that originally appeared in the 12th (March 1973) issue of Recherches, a French journal. (Note: The Screwball Asses incorrectly gives the date of publication as "March 72".) Edited by Félix Guattari and the FHAR, the issue was devoted to homosexuality; the issue bore the title Trois milliards de pervers: Grande Encyclopédie des Homosexualités (Three Billion Perverts: Grand Encyclopedia of Homosexualities). Shortly after publication, copies of the issue were seized by French authorities; the issue was ordered to be destroyed, and Guattari was fined 600 francs for his role in the issue's creation. The Screwball Asses was published in English in 2010, with authorship attributed to Hocquenghem. However, according to Hocquenghem's biographer Antoine Idier, the author of the text is not Hocquenghem but the French writer Christian Maurel. A German translation of the text is published in September 2019 by the publishing house August Verlag with the attribution to Christian Maurel, under the title Für den Arsch.

The Screwball Asses is a critique of various issues in left-wing politics and gay culture, using Marxist and Freudian vocabulary:

We would be beating a dead horse by saying that psychoanalysis trumpets the existence of homosexuality everywhere. Unfortunately, it does not stop there: it immediately establishes that this homosexual libido, in which everyone participates, must be sublimated by sentiments, friendship and socioeconomic activity. The Oedipal prohibition enables family. The anal prohibition allows for salary, profit, and work. The homosexual prohibition enables and organizes all social sentiments concerning the cell, the group, the tribe, the company, the union, and the homeland.

— The Screwball Asses, p. 22.

The author describes the "ghetto" of gay male life in 1970s France, which in his account is often confined to cruising in public restrooms. Hypocrisy among gay men and left-wing activists is also criticized; the author describes the sexual attraction of white gay Frenchmen to Arab men as a form of white guilt, (Note: "What the young gay man says to the Arab is still an avowal of guilt: "The bourgeoisie exploits you, my father exploits you, so fuck me!"") and he decries the tendency in left-wing circles to denounce speakers who use "suspect" words in good faith. The author rejects psychological theories which explain homosexuality as the result of a psychological defect, or unresolved conflict. He also explains gay male archetypes and binaries (e.g. "uber-male or sub-male, black or white, Arab or Viking, top or bottom, and so forth") as forms of mimicry which are caused by heteronormative socialization with heterosexuals, which in turn is informed by capitalism.

The author also laments the gay/lesbian split within the FHAR, suggests that homophobia among heterosexuals is a defense mechanism against latent homosexuality, and touches on the concept of bisexual erasure as it relates to gay or straight people (monosexuals) whose partners could, theoretically, leave them for a partner of the other sex. (Note: "...a homosexual trying to allow heterosexual desire to reappear from beneath the tangle of his fears of women would be accused of treachery...") He also provides a personal detail which is incongruous with Hocqhenghem's purported authorship: "It's lucky I'm gay, because I give a bad impression at the FHAR. As gay as I am, I've been with the same man for eighteen years. (You can't say I've got the right ticket for the revolution!)"

== Works ==
- Homosexual Desire (1972), English translation (1978)
- The Screwball Asses (1973) (English translation by Noura Wedell, Semiotext(e), 2010)
- L'Après-Mai des faunes (1974) (Published in English as Gay Liberation After May '68, translated by Branson, Scott, Duke University Press, 2022, ISBN 978-1-478-01808-7)
- Co-ire, album systématique de l'enfance (Co-anger: systematic album of childhood, with René Schérer) (1976)
- Fin de section (1976) short stories
- La Dérive homosexuelle (1977)
- La Beauté du métis (1979)
- Gay Travels: guide and glance homosexual over the large metropolises (1980)
- Love in Relief (1982, English translation 1985)
- La Colère d'agneau (The Wrath of the Lamb) (1985)
- L'Âme atomique (The Atomic Heart, with René Schérer) (1986)
- Open letter to those who moved from Mao Collars to Rotary Wheels (1986)
- Eve (1987)
- Les voyages et aventures extraordinaires du frère Angelo, Le Livre de Poche (in French), A. Michel, 1988, ISBN 978-2-226-03442-7
- L'Amphitheatre Des Morts: Memoires Anticipees (in French), Editions Gallimard, 1994, ISBN 978-2-070-78055-6
- The Amphitheatre of the Dead: Anticipated Memories, translated by Fox, Max, Guillotine Press, 2019
