= Bouillon de culture =

- Genre: Talk show
- Created by: Bernard Pivot
- Presented by: Bernard Pivot
- Theme music composer: Jerry Brainin
- Opening theme: "The Night Has A Thousand Eyes" (Sonny Rollins, sax)
- Country of origin: France
- Original language: French
- No. of episodes: 407

Production
- Camera setup: Multiple
- Running time: 60 minutes

Original release
- Network: France 2
- Release: January 12, 1991 – June 29, 2001

Bouillon de culture is a weekly, cultural, prime-time, talk show on French television created and hosted by Bernard Pivot. The show ran from January 12, 1991 to June 29, 2001 (407 episodes); it was broadcast on the channel France 2 (which was called "Antenne 2" until 1992). The show originally aired on Sunday evenings, but it was quickly moved to Friday nights, taking the same time-slot as Pivot's previous literary talk show Apostrophes (1975–1990) which it had replaced. The show covered a wide range of cultural topics, especially literature.

The show had an average of 850,000 weekly viewers (about 11.6% of total viewers). The series finale had 1,163,000 viewers (19.3%).

The name of the show comes from the French expression meaning "nutrient broth", "fertile ground", "breeding ground", or "culture/growth medium", but playing on the word "culture".

Among the guests invited for the series finale, Pivot invited James Lipton, the host of the U.S. TV program Inside the Actors Studio, to participate with him in answering the Proust Questionnaire that Pivot had made famous.

== Awards ==
The show won a "7 d'Or" for Best Cultural or Artistic show (Meilleure émission culturelle ou artistique) in 1995 and 2001.
