= List of Inside the Actors Studio episodes =

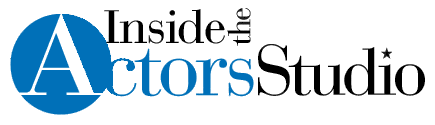

Inside the Actors Studio is a series on the Bravo cable television channel, first hosted by James Lipton from 1994 to 2018, and on Ovation for the show's 23rd and final season in 2019 with an alternating list of hosts. It is produced and directed by Jeff Wurtz; the executive producer is James Lipton. The program, which premiered in 1994, is distributed internationally by CABLEready and is broadcast in 125 countries around the world reaching 89,000,000 homes. It is currently taped at the Michael Schimmel Center for the Arts at Pace University's New York City campus.

Many of the available episode guides conflict with one another regarding the numbering of episodes and in some cases are internally inconsistent. The numbering here is a complete and internally consistent list created from other available episode guides for the show.

== Episodes ==
=== Season 1 (1994) ===
- Inside the Actors Studio premiered on Bravo on June 12, 1994. The first season was also the first-time host James Lipton appeared on the show without his trademark beard..

No.	Air Date	Guest
1	June 12, 1994	Paul Newman
2	June 18, 1994	Alec Baldwin
3	June 22, 1994	Stephen Sondheim
4	July 5, 1994	Sidney Lumet
5	July 12, 1994	Shelley Winters
6	July 18, 1994	Sally Field
7	July 23, 1994	Dennis Hopper
8	July 30, 1994	Arthur Miller
9	August 7, 1994	Arthur Penn
10	August 14, 1994	Estelle Parsons
11	August 21, 1994	Neil Simon
12	August 28, 1994	Sydney Pollack
13	September 4, 1994	Mary Stuart Masterson
14	September 11, 1994	Olympia Dukakis
15	September 18, 1994	William Goldman

=== Season 2 (1995) ===
- Season 2 of Inside the Actors Studio was the last season where host James Lipton appeared on camera without a beard. Lipton's signature look was a full beard, and he sported it for the following season.

No.	Air Date	Guest
1 (16)	March 12, 1995	Lee Grant
2 (17)	March 19, 1995	Faye Dunaway
3 (18)	March 26, 1995	Matthew Broderick
4 (19)	April 2, 1995	Glenn Close
5 (20)	April 9, 1995	Holly Hunter
6 (21)	April 16, 1995	Ellen Burstyn
7 (22)	April 23, 1995	Jessica Lange
8 (23)	April 30, 1995	Carol Burnett
9 (24)	May 7, 1995	Christopher Walken
10 (25)	May 14, 1995	Gene Wilder
11 (26)	May 21, 1995	Stanley Donen
12 (27)	May 28, 1995	Martin Landau

=== Season 3 (1996) ===
- Beginning with this season, James Lipton began wearing a beard for the remainder of the series. This was a change from the clean-shaven look he had sported for the first two seasons.

No.	Air Date	Guest
1 (28)	March 10, 1996	Mark Rydell
2 (29)	March 17, 1996	Norman Jewison
3 (30)	March 24, 1996	Nathan Lane
4 (31)	March 31, 1996	Anjelica Huston
5 (32)	April 7, 1996	Christopher Reeve
6 (33)	April 14, 1996	Matt Dillon
7 (34)	April 21, 1996	Tommy Lee Jones
8 (35)	April 28, 1996	Mike Nichols
9 (36)	May 5, 1996	Julia Roberts
10 (37)	May 12, 1996	Meg Ryan
11 (38)	May 19, 1996	Anthony Quinn
12 (39)	May 26, 1996	Willem Dafoe
13 (40)	June 2, 1996	Billy Crystal

=== Season 4 (1998) ===
No.	Air Date	Guest
1 (41)	August 9, 1998	Harvey Keitel
2 (42)	August 23, 1998	Shirley MacLaine
3 (43)	September 6, 1998	Eli Wallach
4 (44)	September 13, 1998	Anne Jackson
5 (45)	September 20, 1998	Lauren Bacall
6 (46)	September 27, 1998	Martin Short
7 (47)	October 4, 1998	Anthony Hopkins
8 (48)	October 11, 1998	Danny Glover
9 (49)	October 18, 1998	Whoopi Goldberg
10 (50)	October 25, 1998	Jack Lemmon
11 (51)	November 1, 1998	Gary Sinise
12 (52)	November 8, 1998	Kathy Bates
13 (53)	November 15, 1998	Susan Sarandon

=== Season 5 (1998–1999) ===
No.	Air Date	Guest
1 (54)	November 22, 1998	Meryl Streep
2 (55)	November 29, 1998	John Hurt
3 (56)	December 6, 1998	Laurence Fishburne
4 (57)	December 13, 1998	Donald Sutherland
5 (58)	January 3, 1999	Ron Howard
6 (59)	January 10, 1999	Sharon Stone
7 (60)	January 17, 1999	Sean Penn
8 (61)	January 31, 1999	Robert De Niro
9 (62)	February 14, 1999	Steven Spielberg
10 (63)	July 5, 1999	Tim Robbins
11 (64)	July 11, 1999	Jennifer Jason Leigh
12 (65)	July 18, 1999	Kim Basinger
13 (66)	July 25, 1999	Ellen Barkin
14 (67)	August 8, 1999	Peter Falk
15 (68)	August 15, 1999	Jerry Lewis

=== Season 6 (1999–2000) ===
No.	Air Date	Guest
1 (69)	November 14, 1999	Billy Joel
2 (70)	November 21, 1999	Mary Tyler Moore
3 (71)	December 5, 1999	Sylvester Stallone
4 (72)	December 12, 1999	Tom Hanks
5 (73)	January 9, 2000	Michael Caine
6 (74)	April 9, 2000	Geena Davis
7 (75)	April 30, 2000	James Woods
8 (76)	May 7, 2000	Andy Garcia
9 (77)	July 2, 2000	Kevin Spacey
10 (78)	June 4, 2000	Philip Seymour Hoffman
11 (79)	August 6, 2000	Alan Alda
12 (80)	August 20, 2000	Harrison Ford
13 (81)	October 29, 2000	Sigourney Weaver

=== Season 7 (2000–2001) ===
- The 100th episode of Inside the Actors Studio aired on Bravo on August 19, 2001. In this episode, host James Lipton interviews actress Roseanne Barr.

No.	Air Date	Guest
1 (82)	November 12, 2000	Bernadette Peters
2 (83)	November 16, 2000	Val Kilmer
3 (84)	November 19, 2000	James Caan
4 (85)	December 3, 2000	Richard Dreyfuss
5 (86)	December 10, 2000	Gabriel Byrne
6 (87)	December 17, 2000	Spike Lee
7 (88)	December 17, 2000	Ed Harris
8 (89)	January 14, 2001	Ben Affleck
9 (90)	January 28, 2001	Ned Beatty
10 (91)	February 4, 2001	Mike Myers
11 (92)	February 18, 2001	Michael Douglas
12 (93)	March 11, 2001	Gwyneth Paltrow
13 (94)	April 15, 2001	Helen Hunt
14 (95)	May 6, 2001	Francis Ford Coppola
15 (96)	June 10, 2001	Robin Williams
16 (97)	July 15, 2001	Melanie Griffith
17 (98)	July 22, 2001	Antonio Banderas
18 (99)	August 6, 2001	Burt Reynolds
19 (100)	August 19, 2001	Roseanne

=== Season 8 (2001–2002) ===
No.	Air Date	Guest
1 (101)	September 30, 2001	Ben Stiller
2 (102)	October 14, 2001	Gene Hackman
3 (103)	October 21, 2001	Kevin Kline
4 (104)	October 28, 2001	Bruce Willis
5 (105)	November 25, 2001	Kevin Costner
6 (106)	January 13, 2002	Will Smith
7 (107)	January 27, 2002	Stockard Channing
8 (108)	February 17, 2002	Debra Winger
9 (109)	March 3, 2002	Sarah Jessica Parker
10 (110)	March 17, 2002	Ben Kingsley
11 (111)	April 7, 2002	Dennis Quaid
12 (112)	April 21, 2002	Ethan Hawke
13 (113)	May 5, 2002	Richard Gere
14 (114)	May 12, 2002	Hugh Grant
15 (115)	June 2, 2002	Samuel L. Jackson
16 (116)	June 30, 2002	Benicio del Toro
17 (117)	August 4, 2002	Vanessa Redgrave
18 (118)	August 18, 2002	Billy Bob Thornton
19 (119)	September 8, 2002	Johnny Depp

=== Season 9 (2002–2003) ===
- On February 9, 2003, the cast of The Simpsons appeared on Inside the Actors Studio. They talked about their lives as cast members and showed clips from episodes of The Simpsons.

No.	Air Date	Guest
1 (120)	October 6, 2002	Sissy Spacek
2 (121)	October 27, 2002	Juliette Binoche
3 (122)	November 10, 2002	Jeanne Moreau
4 (123)	November 17, 2002	Pierce Brosnan
5 (124)	December 8, 2002	Ian McKellen
6 (125)	December 15, 2002	Martin Scorsese
7 (126)	December 22, 2002	Julianne Moore
8 (127)	January 12, 2003	Edward Norton
9 (128)	February 9, 2003	Cast of The Simpsons
10 (129)	February 16, 2003	Nicolas Cage
11 (130)	March 2, 2003	Drew Barrymore
12 (131)	March 9, 2003	Renée Zellweger
13 (132)	April 13, 2003	John Travolta
14 (133)	May 4, 2003	Jeremy Irons
15 (134)	May 11, 2003	Joanne Woodward
16 (135)	May 18, 2003	Martin Sheen
17 (136)	July 20, 2003	Jeff Bridges

=== Season 10 (2003–2004) ===
- Inside the Actors Studio celebrated its 10th anniversary season on Bravo. The season included a retrospective of the show's history and memorable moments, as well as in-depth interviews with actors.

No.	Air Date	Guest
1 (137)	September 14, 2003	John Goodman
2 (138)	October 5, 2003	Clint Eastwood
3 (139)	November 16, 2003	Cast of Will & Grace
4 (140)	December 14, 2003	Cate Blanchett
5 (141)	December 21, 2003	Jude Law
6 (142)	December 28, 2003	Naomi Watts
7 (143)	January 4, 2004	Russell Crowe
8 (144)	January 11, 2004	Tom Cruise
9 (145)	January 18, 2004	Charlize Theron
10 (146)	February 8, 2004	Diane Lane
11 (147)	February 15, 2004	Jay Leno
12 (148)	March 7, 2004	Hugh Jackman
13 (149)	March 14, 2004	Kate Winslet
14 (150)	March 21, 2004	Barbra Streisand
15 (151)	June 6, 2004	Bette Midler
16 (152)	June 20, 2004	10th Anniversary Special

=== Season 11 (2004–2005) ===
No.	Air Date	Guest
1 (153)	October 10, 2004	Jennifer Lopez
2 (154)	October 17, 2004	James Gandolfini
3 (155)	October 24, 2004	William H. Macy
4 (156)	October 31, 2004	George Carlin
5 (157)	November 7, 2004	Jennifer Connelly
6 (158)	November 14, 2004	Mark Wahlberg
7 (159)	November 21, 2004	Natalie Portman
8 (160)	November 28, 2004	Jamie Foxx
9 (161)	December 5, 2004	Salma Hayek
10 (162)	January 2, 2005	Morgan Freeman
11 (163)	January 9, 2005	Cameron Diaz
12 (164)	January 23, 2005	Kiefer Sutherland
13 (165)	January 30, 2005	Robert Redford
14 (166)	February 6, 2005	Colin Farrell
15 (167)	February 13, 2005	Val Kilmer - second visit
16 (168)	February 20, 2005	Owen Wilson
17 (169)	April 10, 2005	David Duchovny
18 (170)	April 24, 2005	Jane Fonda
19 (171)	June 5, 2005	Angelina Jolie
20 (172)	June 19, 2005	Cast of Everybody Loves Raymond
21 (173)	September 25, 2005	Jodie Foster
22 (174)	October 16, 2005	Elton John
23 (175)	October 23, 2005	Rosie O'Donnell
24 (176)	October 30, 2005	Michael J. Fox

=== Season 12 (2005–2006) ===
No.	Air Date	Guest
1 (177)	December 11, 2005	Cast of The Producers
2 (178)	December 18, 2005	Barbara Walters
3 (179)	January 8, 2006	Queen Latifah
4 (180)	January 15, 2006	Ralph Fiennes
5 (181)	January 22, 2006	Martin Lawrence
6 (182)	February 5, 2006	Liza Minnelli
7 (183)	February 12, 2006	Dave Chappelle
8 (184)	May 7, 2006	Cast of Law & Order
9 (185)	May 14, 2006	Tom Hanks - second visit
10 (186)	May 21, 2006	Don Cheadle
11 (187)	May 28, 2006	Tim Allen
12 (188)	June 18, 2006	Dustin Hoffman
13 (189)	July 9, 2006	Robert Downey Jr.
14 (190)	July 31, 2006	Hugh Laurie
15 (191)	September 18, 2006	Teri Hatcher
16 (192)	October 2, 2006	Al Pacino

=== Season 13 (2006–2007) ===
- On June 11, 2007, Bravo aired the 200th episode of Inside the Actors Studio. In the show's 200th episode, host James Lipton interviews Kyra Sedgwick.

No.	Air Date	Guest
1 (193)	December 11, 2006	Forest Whitaker
2 (194)	December 18, 2006	Eddie Murphy
3 (195)	January 8, 2007	Matt Damon
4 (196)	February 19, 2007	Diana Ross
5 (197)	March 12, 2007	Chris Rock
6 (198)	March 19, 2007	Mark Ruffalo
7 (199)	June 4, 2007	Julia Louis-Dreyfus
8 (200)	June 11, 2007	Kyra Sedgwick
9 (201)	August 6, 2007	Michelle Pfeiffer
10 (202)	September 17, 2007	Charlie Sheen
11 (203)	October 8, 2007	Billy Crystal - second visit
12 (204)	October 15, 2007	Anthony Hopkins - second visit
13 (205)	October 22, 2007	Alec Baldwin - second visit
14 (206)	October 29, 2007	Halle Berry
15 (207)	December 3, 2007	John Cusack

=== Season 14 (2008) ===
No.	Air Date	Guest
1 (208)	May 19, 2008	Sarah Jessica Parker - second visit
2 (209)	June 16, 2008	Mike Myers - second visit
3 (210)	September 22, 2008	Brooke Shields
4 (211)	October 13, 2008	Christian Slater

=== Season 15 (2008–2009) ===
No.	Air Date	Guest
1 (212)	November 3, 2008	Goldie Hawn
2 (213)	November 10, 2008	Dave Chappelle
3 (214)	December 1, 2008	Daniel Radcliffe
4 (215)	January 5, 2009	Josh Brolin
5 (216)	January 12, 2009	Laura Linney
6 (217)	January 19, 2009	Ricky Gervais
7 (218)	January 26, 2009	Conan O'Brien
8 (219)	February 2, 2009	Anthony LaPaglia
9 (220)	May 4, 2009	Denis Leary
10 (221)	May 11, 2009	Danny DeVito
11 (222)	July 27, 2009	Judd Apatow
12 (223)	August 31, 2009	Mickey Rourke
13 (224)	September 7, 2009	Jason Bateman
14 (225)	September 14, 2009	Cast of Family Guy
15 (226)	September 21, 2009	Amy Poehler

=== Season 16 (2009–2010) ===
No.	Air Date	Guest
1 (227)	November 9, 2009	Hilary Swank
2 (228)	November 16, 2009	Jon Bon Jovi
3 (229)	December 21, 2009	Kate Hudson
4 (230)	March 1, 2010	James Cameron
5 (231)	May 25, 2010	Sean Combs
6 (232)	September 28, 2010	Betty White

=== Season 17 (2010–2011) ===
No.	Air Date	Guest
1 (233)	December 7, 2010	James Franco
2 (234)	January 10, 2011	Jim Carrey
3 (235)	February 7, 2011	Colin Firth
4 (236)	March 14, 2011	Bradley Cooper
5 (237)	June 7, 2011	Cast of Modern Family
6 (238)	July 11, 2011	Jennifer Aniston

=== Season 18 (2012) ===
No.	Air Date	Guest
1 (239)	January 31, 2012	George Clooney
2 (240)	February 10, 2012	Brad Pitt
3 (241)	April 9, 2012	Cast of Glee
4 (242)	May 14, 2012	Cast of Mad Men
5 (243)	October 3, 2012	Liam Neeson

=== Season 19 (2013–2014) ===
- On May 29, 2013, Bravo aired the 250th episode of Inside the Actors Studio. The episode featured Bradley Cooper, Robert De Niro, Christopher Walken and Barbara Walters, and Dave Chappelle.

No.	Air Date	Guest
1 (244)	February 13, 2013	Hugh Jackman - second visit
2 (245)	March 19, 2013	Tina Fey
3 (246)	May 29, 2013	250th Special - Bradley Cooper, Robert De Niro, Jennifer Lopez, Christopher Walken and Barbara Walters, Dave Chappelle, and more.
4 (247)	September 19, 2013	Jake Gyllenhaal
5 (248)	November 7, 2013	Cast of Arrested Development
6 (249)	December 26, 2013	Bruce and Laura Dern
7 (250)	February 19, 2014	Amy Adams

=== Season 20 (2014–2015) ===
- Inside the Actors Studio celebrated its 20th anniversary on Bravo. The show debuted in 1994, and over the years has featured in-depth interviews with a wide range of actors.

No.	Air Date	Guest
1 (251)	February 20, 2014	Matthew McConaughey
2 (252)	March 27, 2014	Cast of How I Met Your Mother
3 (253)	September 22, 2014	Mariska Hargitay
4 (254)	October 5, 2014	Sting
5 (255)	February 12, 2015	Neil Patrick Harris
6 (256)	June 18, 2015	Jim Parsons

=== Season 21 (2015–2016) ===
No.	Air Date	Guest
1 (257)	October 22, 2015	Sarah Silverman
2 (258)	November 25, 2015	Bryan Cranston
3 (259)	December 17, 2015	Steve Carell
4 (260)	January 7, 2016	Jeff Daniels
5 (261)	February 11, 2016	Cast of The Walking Dead
6 (262)	March 31, 2016	Chris Meloni

=== Season 22 (2016–2018) ===
- This was the last season that James Lipton hosted Inside the Actors Studio after the show premiered in 1994. It was also the last season to air on Bravo before Ovation picked up the show.

No.	Air Date	Guest
1 (263)	December 21, 2016	Jessica Chastain
2 (264)	January 5, 2017	Viola Davis
3 (265)	February 2, 2017	Cuba Gooding Jr.
4 (266)	February 9, 2017	Cast of Girls
5 (267)	June 22, 2017	Scarlett Johansson
6 (268)	December 21, 2017	Kristen Wiig
7 (269)	January 11, 2018	Ted Danson

=== Season 23 (2019) ===
- The 23rd and final season of "Inside the Actors Studio" was the first and only season to air on Ovation. In this season, there was a different host for each episode

No.	Air Date	Host	Guest
1 (270)	October 13, 2019	Alec Baldwin	Henry Winkler
2 (271)	October 20, 2019	Jane Lynch	David Oyelowo
3 (272)	October 27, 2019	Pedro Pascal	Willem Dafoe (2)
4 (273)	November 3, 2019	Ellen Burstyn	Al Pacino (2)
5 (274)	November 10, 2019	LaTanya Richardson Jackson	Alfre Woodard
6 (275)	November 17, 2019	Greta Gerwig	Laura Dern (2)
7 (276)	December 6, 2019	Kelsey Grammer	James Burrows
8 (277)	December 15, 2019	Uzo Aduba	Lupita Nyong'o
