= Actors Studio Drama School at Pace University =

Graduate program for the theater arts

Coordinates: 40.71136°N 74.00513°W

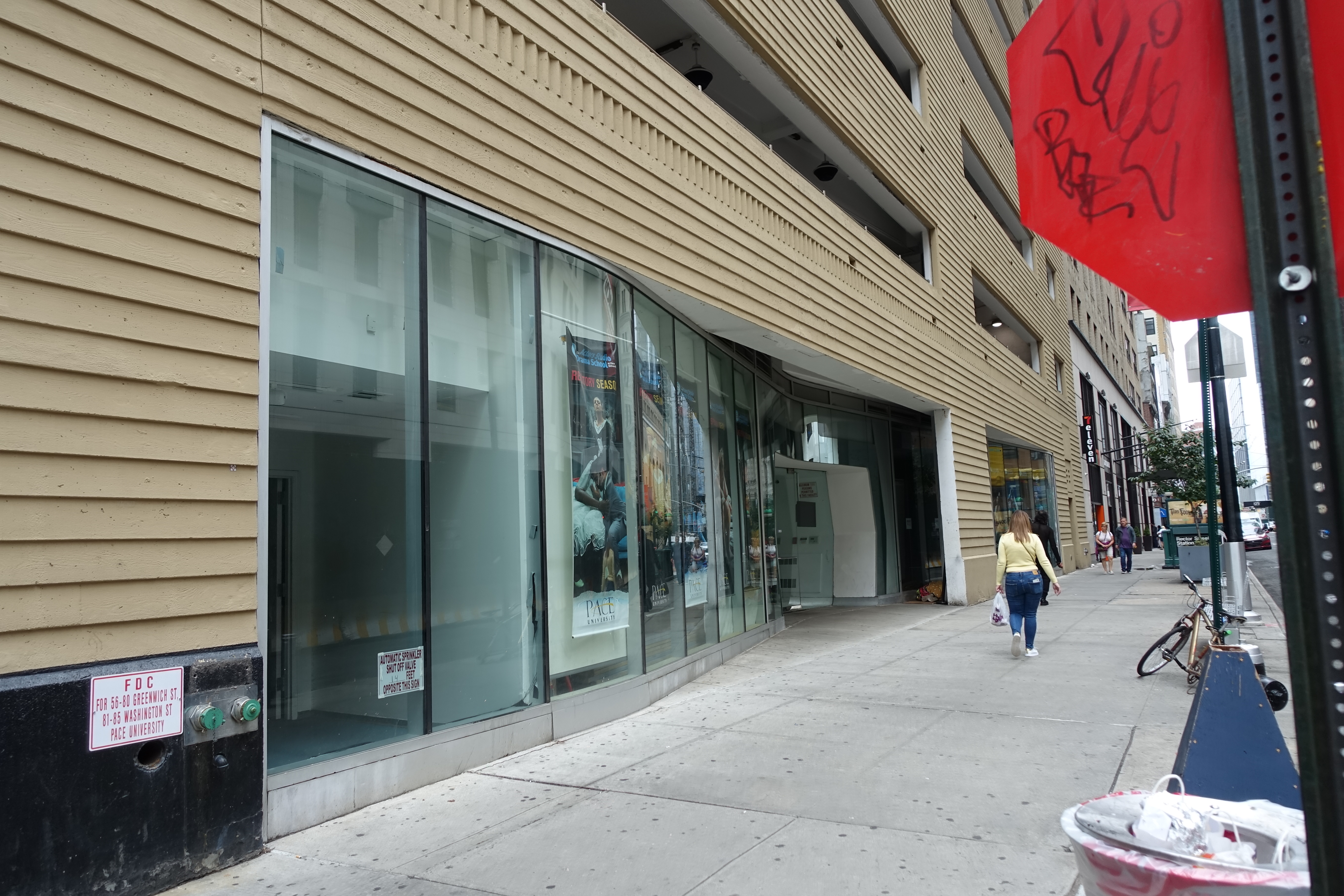
The school building in Lower Manhattan in 2022.

The Actors Studio Drama School at Pace University is a three-year graduate program in the theater arts. It has been located at Pace University in New York since 2006 and grants Master of Fine Arts degrees in acting, directing, and playwriting. The program is sanctioned by the Actors Studio, though graduation from the school does not guarantee membership in the Actors Studio.

In October 2024, Pace University announced that it would discontinue the program in 2027, after the three cohorts currently enrolled graduate.

== History ==
The Actors Studio Drama School was established by the Actors Studio in 1994. From 1994 to 2005, the school was a graduate division of the New School. James Lipton, who had brokered the partnership between the Actors Studio and the New School, was its first dean, serving in that role until his retirement in 2004.

In 2005, the Actors Studio and the New School declined to renew their contract, and the Actors Studio soon thereafter signed a 10-year contract with Pace University, where the Actors Studio Drama School became a graduate program of the Dyson College of Arts and Sciences. Andreas Manolikakis, chair of the Actors Studio Drama School at Pace, said at the time that he had "no regrets" about the departure from the New School and saw it as "a necessary step for the protection of the philosophy of the original curriculum that was designed by the leaders of the Actors Studio."

== Academics ==
The curriculum of the Actors Studio Drama School is highly collaborative, with students from all three concentrations working closely together. All students study acting, based heavily on the work of Constantin Stanislavski. Filming of Inside the Actors Studio serves as a master class for the students a few times a semester. Students also sit in on closed-door sessions at the Actors Studio in New York.

All graduating students hold the status of working finalist at the Actors Studio itself, during which they may attend weekly sessions and audition for Studio membership, bypassing the usual preliminary audition. All directing and playwriting graduates are invited, for at least one year, to be part of the Playwrights and Directors Workshop of the Actors Studio, a unit created for the continuation of the training of directing and playwriting graduates.

== Faculty ==
=== Acting, Voice, and Movement ===
- Susan Aston (director of acting)
- Craig Bacon (voice and speech)
- Kate Taney Billingsley (movement and playwrights/directors unit)
- Michael Billingsley (movement)
- Matthew Dudley (general American speech)
- James Elliott (classics, period, and style)
- Cathy Haase (acting)
- Jacqueline Knapp (acting)
- Corinna May (voice and speech)
- Robert Serrell (voice and speech)
- Yokko Usami (movement)

=== Directing and Design ===
- Jim Fagan (directing)
- Shawn Lewis (design)
- Andreas Manolikakis (director of directing, acting)
- Brian Rhinehart (directing, acting, and theater history)
- Ed Setrakian (directing)

=== Playwriting ===
- Clay McLeod Chapman (playwriting)
- Julia Rae Maldonado (playwriting)
- Sheri Wilner (director of playwriting and co-chair)

== Notable alumni ==
=== 1994–2005 ===
From 1994 to 2005, the Actors Studio Drama School was a graduate division of the New School.

- Adeel Akhtar
- Nadège August
- Austin Basis
- Shelagh Carter
- Bradley Cooper
- Eisa Davis
- Richard Kuranda
- Carey Lovelace
- Matthew Paul Olmos
- Irene Sankoff
- Aurin Squire
- Chris Stack
- Lloyd Suh
- Jason Williams (actor)

=== 2006–present ===
- Bekah Brunstetter
- Xanthe Elbrick
- Stevie Walker-Webb
