= List of awards and nominations received by James Lipton =

List of James Lipton awards
Award	Wins	Nominations
Primetime Emmy Awards	1	19
Critics' Choice Television Awards	1	2
Daytime Emmy Awards	0	1
Producers Guild of America Awards	0	3
CableACE Award	0	1
Overall	3	26

The following is a list of awards and nominations received by television host, actor, director, producer, writer and lyricist James Lipton.

== Primetime Emmy Awards ==
Year	Nominated work	Category	Result
1988	Happy Birthday, Bob: 50 Stars Salute Your 50 Years with NBC	Outstanding Achievement in Music and Lyrics	Nominated
1997	Inside the Actors Studio	Outstanding Informational Series	Nominated
1998	Inside the Actors Studio	Outstanding Non-Fiction Series	Nominated
1999	Inside the Actors Studio	Outstanding Non-Fiction Series	Nominated
2000	Inside the Actors Studio	Outstanding Non-Fiction Series	Nominated
2001	Inside the Actors Studio	Outstanding Non-Fiction Series	Nominated
2002	Inside the Actors Studio	Outstanding Non-Fiction Series (Informational)	Nominated
2002	Inside the Actors Studio	Outstanding Non-Fiction Special (Informational)	Nominated
2003	Inside the Actors Studio	Outstanding Non-Fiction Series (Traditional)	Nominated
2004	Inside the Actors Studio	Outstanding Nonfiction Series	Nominated
2005	Inside the Actors Studio	Outstanding Nonfiction Series	Nominated
2005	Inside the Actors Studio	Outstanding Nonfiction Special	Nominated
2006	Inside the Actors Studio	Outstanding Nonfiction Series	Nominated
2007	Inside the Actors Studio	Outstanding Nonfiction Series	Nominated
2008	Inside the Actors Studio	Outstanding Nonfiction Series	Nominated
2012	Inside the Actors Studio	Outstanding Nonfiction Series	Nominated
2013	Inside the Actors Studio	Outstanding Nonfiction Series or Special	Won
2014	Inside the Actors Studio	Outstanding Nonfiction Series or Special	Nominated
2015	Inside the Actors Studio	Outstanding Nonfiction Series or Special	Nominated

== Critics' Choice Television Awards ==
Year	Nominated work	Category	Result
2015	Inside the Actors Studio	Best Reality Host	Nominated
2016	Inside the Actors Studio	Best Reality Show Host	Won

== Daytime Emmy Awards ==
Year	Nominated work	Category	Result
1974	The Doctors	Best Writing for a Drama Series	Nominated
Honorary awards
2007	Lifetime Achievement Award		Recipient

== Producers Guild of America Awards ==
Year	Nominated work	Category	Result
2005	Inside the Actors Studio	Outstanding Producer of Non-Fiction Television	Nominated
2013	Inside the Actors Studio	Outstanding Producer of Non-Fiction Television	Nominated
2014	Inside the Actors Studio	Outstanding Producer of Non-Fiction Television	Nominated

== CableACE Award ==
Year	Nominated work	Category	Result
1997	Inside the Actors Studio	Talk Show Series	Nominated
