= Apostrophes (talk show) =

- Genre: Talk show
- Created by: Bernard Pivot
- Presented by: Bernard Pivot
- Theme music composer: Sergei Rachmaninoff
- Opening theme: "Piano Concerto No. 1"
- Country of origin: France
- Original language: French
- No. of episodes: 724

Production
- Camera setup: Multiple
- Running time: 60 minutes

Original release
- Network: Antenne 2
- Release: January 10, 1975 – June 22, 1990

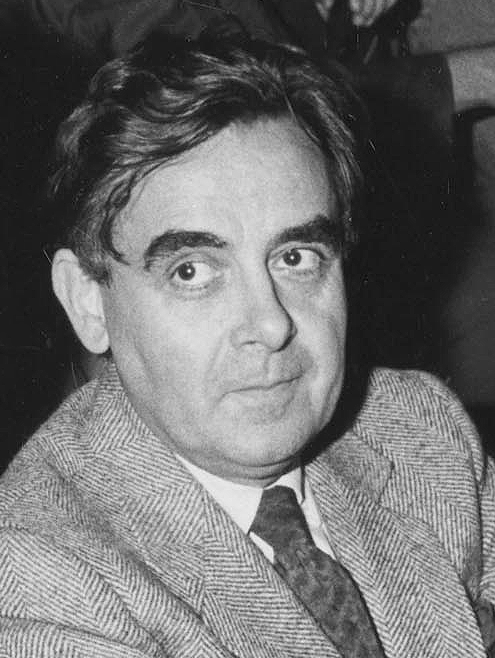
Bernard Pivot, 1986

Apostrophes is a live, weekly, literary, prime-time, talk show on French television created and hosted by Bernard Pivot. It ran for fifteen years (724 episodes) from January 10, 1975, to June 22, 1990, and was one of the most watched shows on French television (around 6 million regular viewers). It was broadcast on Friday nights on the channel France 2 (which was called "Antenne 2" from 1975 to 1992).

The hour-long show was devoted to books, authors and literature. The format varied between one-on-one interviews with a single author and open discussions between four or five authors. Notable authors who appeared on the show included: Jorge Luis Borges, Vladimir Nabokov, Norman Mailer, Aleksandr Solzhenitsyn, Marguerite Yourcenar, Susan Sontag, Neil Sheehan, Milan Kundera, Georges Simenon, William Styron, John le Carré, Tom Wolfe, Umberto Eco, Marguerite Duras, Arthur Miller, and Doris Lessing. Charles Bukowski's appearance on the show (22 September 1978) is famous for his being visibly drunk, insulting the host and walking off in the midst of the broadcast. The show also invited political figures (Valéry Giscard d’Estaing, the Dalai Lama, Robert Badinter, François Mitterrand), intellectuals, historians, sociologists (Pierre Bourdieu, Claude Lévi-Strauss), actors and directors (Marcello Mastroianni, Roman Polanski, François Truffaut, Jean-Luc Godard) to discuss their books and literature.

At the end of each broadcast, Bernard Pivot traditionally asked his guests to answer the Proust Questionnaire. (Inspired by Pivot, James Lipton, the host of the U.S. TV program Inside the Actors Studio, gives an adapted version of the Proust Questionnaire to some of his guests.)

An appearance on Apostrophes could bring on several thousand copies in book sales, according to book trade sources. In 1982, French writer Régis Debray accused Pivot of having "a virtual dictatorship over publishing markets."

In Quebec, the show was broadcast on TVFQ 99, and later on TV5.

Apostrophes replaced, in 1975, Italiques and was replaced by the show Bouillon de culture (which debuted on 12 January 1991), produced by Bernard Pivot, who wanted to develop a show which featured more than just literary cultural topics.

== Awards ==
The show won Best Cultural or Artistic show (Meilleure émission culturelle ou artistique) in 1985 and 1987, and Best Producer (Meilleur producteur de télévision) for Bernard Pivot in 1985 at the "7 d'Or" (French television awards organized by Télé 7 Jours).

== See also ==
- List of French television series
