= Bernard Pivot =

French journalist (1935–2024)

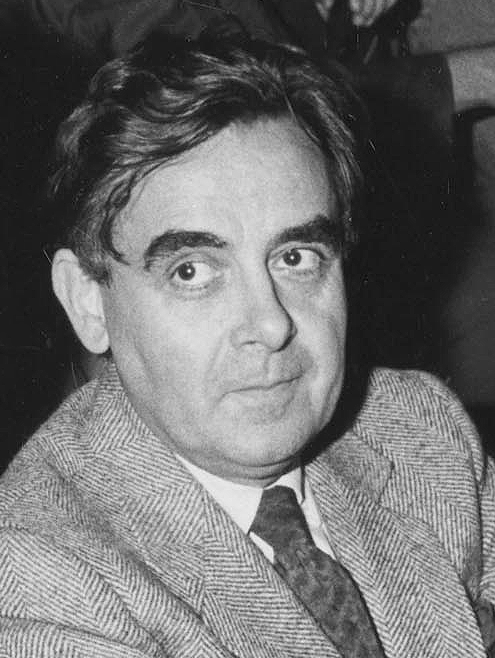
- Pivot in 1986
- Born: Bernard Claude Pivot; 5 May 1935; Lyon, France
- Died: 6 May 2024 (aged 89); Neuilly-sur-Seine, France
- Education: Lycée Ampère
- Alma mater: University of Lyon; Centre de formation des journalistes
- Occupations: Journalist, television personality
- Known for: TV host Apostrophes and Bouillon de culture

Bernard Pivot (French: [bɛʁnaʁ pivo]; 5 May 1935 – 6 May 2024) was a French journalist, interviewer and host of cultural television programmes. He was chairman of the Académie Goncourt from 2014 to 2020.

== Biography ==
Pivot was born in Lyon on 5 May 1935, the son of two grocers. During World War II his father, Charles Pivot, was taken prisoner and his mother moved the family home to the village of Quincié-en-Beaujolais, where Bernard Pivot started school. In 1945 his father was released and the reunited family returned to Lyon. At age 10 Pivot went to a Catholic boarding school where he discovered a passion for sport, while he was more average at traditional school subjects, except French and history.

After starting law studies in Lyon, Pivot entered the Centre de formation des journalistes (CFJ) in Paris, where he met his future wife, Monique. He graduated second in his class. After an internship at Le Progrès in Lyon, he studied economic journalism for a full year, and then joined the Figaro Littéraire in 1958.

In 1970 he hosted a humorous daily radio programme . In 1971 the Figaro Littéraire closed and Pivot joined Le Figaro. He left in 1974 after a disagreement with Jean d'Ormesson. Jean-Jacques Servan-Schreiber invited him to start a new project, which led to the creation of a new magazine, Lire, a year later. Meanwhile, he had begun hosting a television programme in April 1973 called Ouvrez les guillemets on the First Channel of the ORTF. In 1974, the ORTF was dissolved and Pivot started his Apostrophes programme. Apostrophes was first broadcast on Antenne 2 on 10 January 1975, and ran until 1990. Pivot then created Bouillon de culture, with the aim of broadening people's interests beyond reading. However, he eventually returned to books.

Pivot died of cancer in Neuilly-sur-Seine, on 6 May 2024, at the age of 89.

== Spelling championships ==
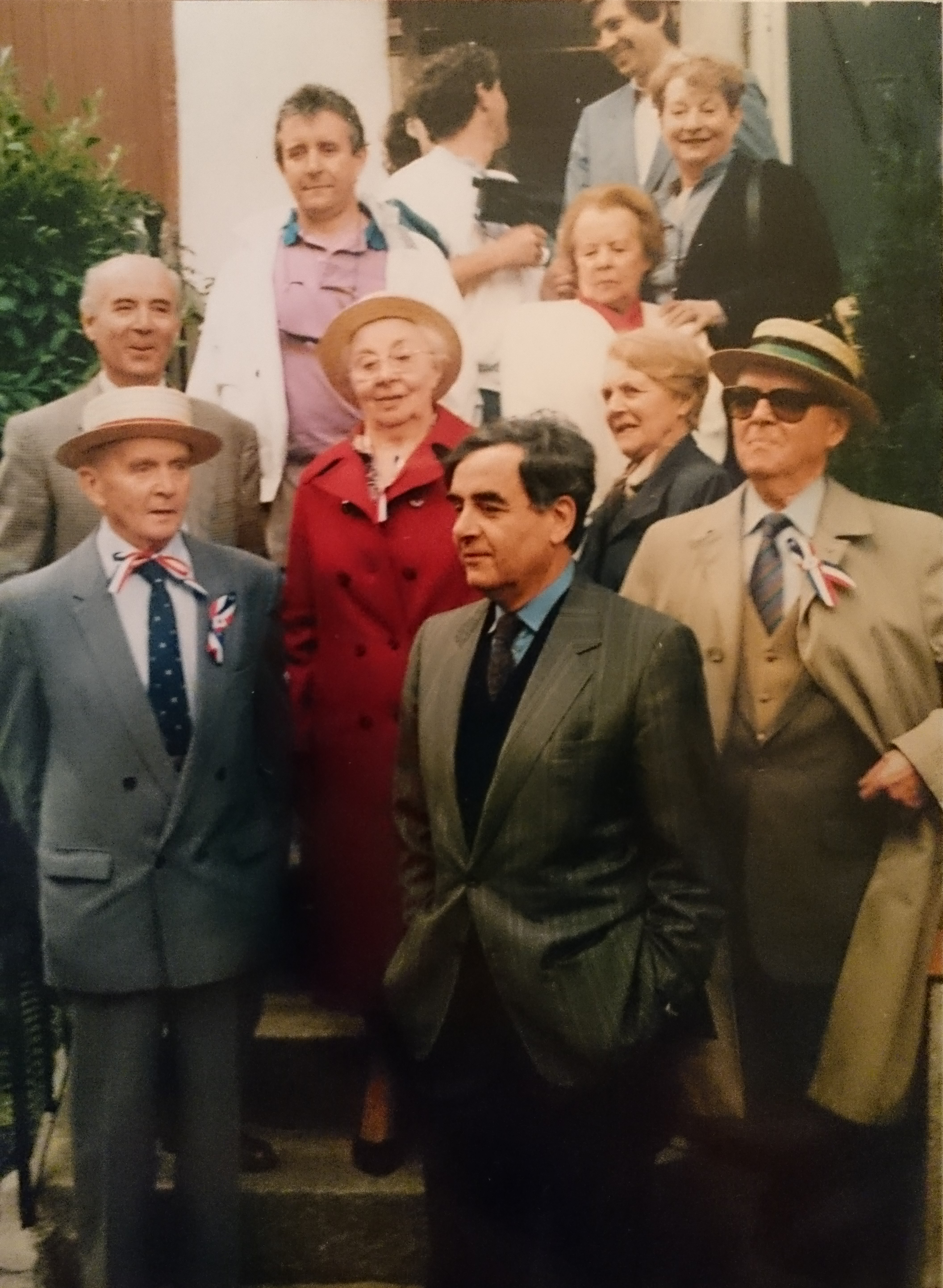
Bernard Pivot, centre, in Saint-Symphorien-de-Lay in the 1980s. His father, Charles, is to the right, wearing a tricolour ribbon.

In 1985, Pivot created the Championnats d'orthographe ("Spelling Championships") with linguist Micheline Sommant, which in 1992 became Championnats mondiaux d'orthographe ("World Spelling Championships"), then the Dicos d'or ("Golden Dictionaries") in 1993.

== Pivot and James Lipton ==
James Lipton was inspired to create Inside the Actors Studio by a chance viewing of a Pivot programme on cable TV. Lipton adapted Pivot's use of a Proust Questionnaire to one that he himself used at the end of each episode of Inside the Actors Studio.

However, the question "If God exists, what would you like Him to tell you when you're dead?" was considered potentially offensive to US audiences and replaced by a more acceptable "If heaven exists, what would you like to hear God say when you arrive at the pearly gates?"

Pivot became aware that Lipton was inspired by his questionnaire and invited him to appear on the final episode of Bouillon de culture.

== Television work ==
- Ouvrez les guillemets (1973–1974)
- Apostrophes (1975–1990)
- Bouillon de culture (1991–2001)
- Double je (2002–2006)

== Defence of paedophilia ==
On 26 November 1973, Pivot invited the paedophile novelist Tony Duvert onto his show Ouvrez les guillemets. Duvert refused, letting his editor and supporters Jérôme Lindon and Alain Robbe-Grillet promote his book.

In January 1975, Yves Berger, the literary director of Éditions Grasset and Pierre Sabbagh's cultural adviser on the 2nd channel of French television, persuaded Jacqueline Baudrier, in charge of the 1st channel, to replace Marc Gilbert's Italics with Pivot's Ouvrez les guillemets talk show. On 30 May 1975, he received Vladimir Nabokov, the author of Lolita on Apostrophes; on 12 December 1976, Michel Foucault, who criticised psychoanalysis and "contractual sexuality" based on consent or non-consent, with René Schérer, Guy Hocquenghem and François Châtelet; on 14 October 1983, Renaud Camus, defender of the paedophile cause; on 23 April 1982, Daniel Cohn-Bendit, who described having ambiguous relations with children in kindergarten; on 2 March 1990, Gabriel Matzneff, a noted paedophile whose book Mes amours décomposés was highly criticised; on 23 February 2001, Catherine Dolto, to talk about the legalisation of paedophilia on Bouillon de Culture; and in 2005, Michel Tournier, whose references to paedophilia were published in La Pléiade in 2017.

On 17 March 2013, Pivot defended Alexandre Postel's book Un homme effacé, which described a man who owns explicit pictures of children on his computer, and on 30 October 2016, La Mauvaise vie by Frédéric Mitterrand, as a "brave book, very brave, a kind of secular confession where each confession, as in Georges Perec's "Je me souviens…", starts with "Je regrette…".

In 2017, neuropsychiatrist Louis Masquin, in the Catholic magazine La Croix, described the introduction of paedophilic literature on French television in Pivot's shows as the "reflection of the "paedophile adventure", "considered approximately normal".

In 2019, Pivot wrote on Twitter that "cardinals, bishops and priests who rape children don't believe in heaven or hell", criticising the influence of the Vatican II reform. In September 2019, he declared on Twitter: "In my generation, boys looked for little Swedish girls who had the reputation of being more open than French girls. I imagine our surprise, our fear, if we had approached a Greta Thunberg". Julien Bayou, from the environmentalist party Europe Écologie – Les Verts, replied: "You're talking about a minor" and French feminist Caroline de Haas asked him to delete his post, something he refused to do. He was immediately defended by far-right essayist Éric Zemmour. In December, Pivot apologised for allowing Gabriel Matzneff to describe his relationships with teenage girls and boys on his literary talk shows without challenging him.

In July 2021, Pivot posted a tweet about actress Françoise Arnoul, who had just died, in which he remarked that "young people in the 1950s dreamed about her breasts. But the ones seen in The Wreck were not hers. She confessed it to me on a broadcast. Still a minor, she was not allowed to be filmed naked."

== Honors and awards ==
- Knight of the Order of Agricultural Merit
- Knight of the National Order of Quebec
- Officer of the Order of Canada
