= Proust Questionnaire =

Set of questions used by interviewers

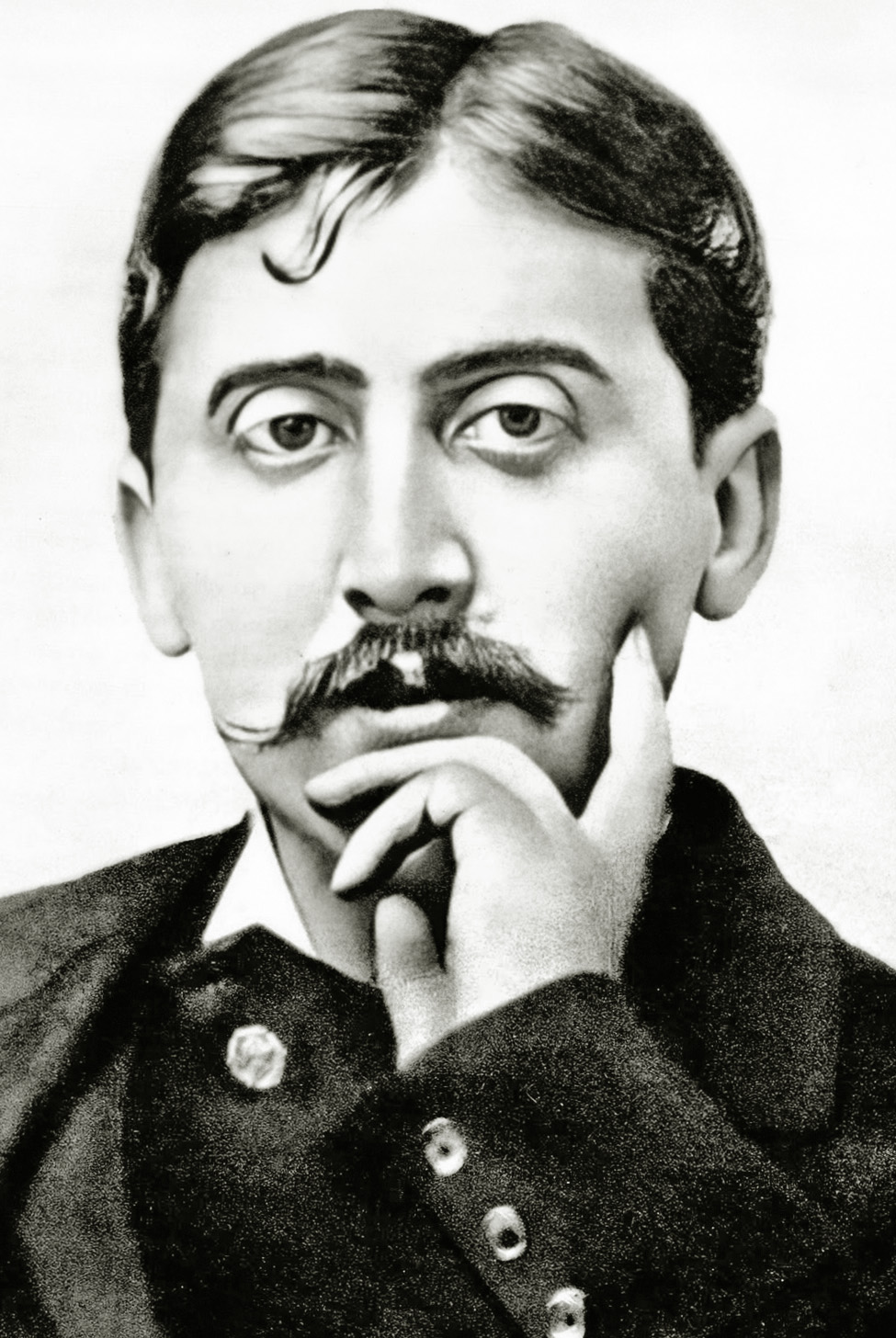
Marcel Proust, 1895.

The Proust Questionnaire is a set of questions answered by the French writer Marcel Proust, and often used by modern interviewers.

Proust answered the questionnaire in a confession album—a form of parlor game popular among Victorians. The album belonged to his friend Antoinette, daughter of future French President Félix Faure, titled "An Album to Record Thoughts, Feelings, etc."

The album was found in 1924 by Faure's son, and published in the French literary journal Les Cahiers du Mois. It was auctioned on May 27, 2003, for the sum of €102,000 (US$113,609.46).

Other historical figures who have answered confession albums are Oscar Wilde, Karl Marx, Arthur Conan Doyle, Stéphane Mallarmé, Paul Cézanne, Martin Boucher and Enzo Kehl.

== Variations ==
Bernard Pivot used a similar questionnaire at the end of every episode of his literary talk show, Apostrophes. Inspired by Pivot, James Lipton had used this questionnaire—translated to English—at the end of every episode of Inside the Actors Studio.

A similar questionnaire is regularly seen on the back page of Vanity Fair magazine, answered by various celebrities. In October 2009, Vanity Fair launched an interactive version of the questionnaire, that compares individual answers to those of various luminaries.

Another version of the questionnaire, as answered by various Canadian authors, is a regular feature on the radio program The Next Chapter.

== The questionnaire ==
There are two surviving sets of answers to the confession album questions by Proust: the first, from 1885 or 1886, is to an English confessions album, although his answers are in French. The second, from 1891 or 1892, is from a French album, Les confidences de salon ("Drawing room confessions"), which contains translations of the original questions, lacking some that were in the English version and adding others.

Confessions questions	Confidences questions	Proust's answers 1886	Proust's answers 1890
Your favourite virtue	The principal aspect of my personality	All virtues that are not limited to a sect: the universal virtues.	The need to be loved; more precisely, the need to be caressed and spoiled much more than the need to be admired.
Your favourite qualities in a man	The quality that I desire in a man	Intelligence, moral sense.	Feminine charm.
Your favourite qualities in a woman	The quality that I desire in a woman	Gentleness, naturalness, intelligence.	Manly virtues, and the union of friendship.
Your chief characteristic	----	[left blank]	----
What you appreciate the most in your friends	What I appreciate most about my friends		To have tenderness for me, if their personage is exquisite enough to render quite high the price of their tenderness.
Your main fault	My main fault		Not knowing, not being able to "want".
Your favourite occupation	My favourite occupation	Reading, daydreaming, writing verse, history, theater.	Loving.
Your idea of happiness	My dream of happiness	To live in contact with those I love, with the beauties of nature, with a quantity of books and music, and to have, within easy distance, a French theater.	I am afraid it be not great enough, I dare not speak it, I am afraid of destroying it by speaking it.
Your idea of misery	What would be my greatest misfortune?	To be separated from Mama.	Not to have known my mother or my grandmother.
If not yourself, who would you be?	What I should like to be	Since the question does arise, I prefer not to answer it. All the same, I should very much have liked to be Pliny the Younger.	Myself, as the people whom I admire would like me to be.
Where would you like to live?	The country where I should like to live	In the country of the ideal, or, rather, my ideal.	A country where certain things that I should like would come true as though by magic, and where tenderness would always be reciprocated.
Your favourite colour and flower	My favourite colour	I like them all and, for the flowers, I do not know.	The beauty is not in the colors, but in their harmony.
----	The flower that I like	Hers/His - and after, all of them.	
----	My favourite bird	The swallow	
Your favourite prose authors	My favourite prose authors	George Sand, Aug. Thierry	Currently, Anatole France and Pierre Loti
Your favourite poets	My favourite poets	Musset	Baudelaire and Alfred de Vigny
Your favourite heroes in fiction	My heroes in fiction	Those of romance and poetry, those who are the expression of an ideal rather than an imitation of the real.	Hamlet
Your favourite heroines in fiction	My favourite heroines in fiction	A woman of genius leading an ordinary life.	Bérénice
Your favourite painters and composers	My favourite composers	Meissonier, Mozart, Gounod	Beethoven, Wagner, Schumann

== Related links ==
- Responses to the questionnaire by Antoinette Faure
- Answer Vanity Fair's Interactive Proust Questionnaire and compare your results
- Answer the Proust Questionnaire
