= Richard Kuranda =

American theatre director (born 1969)

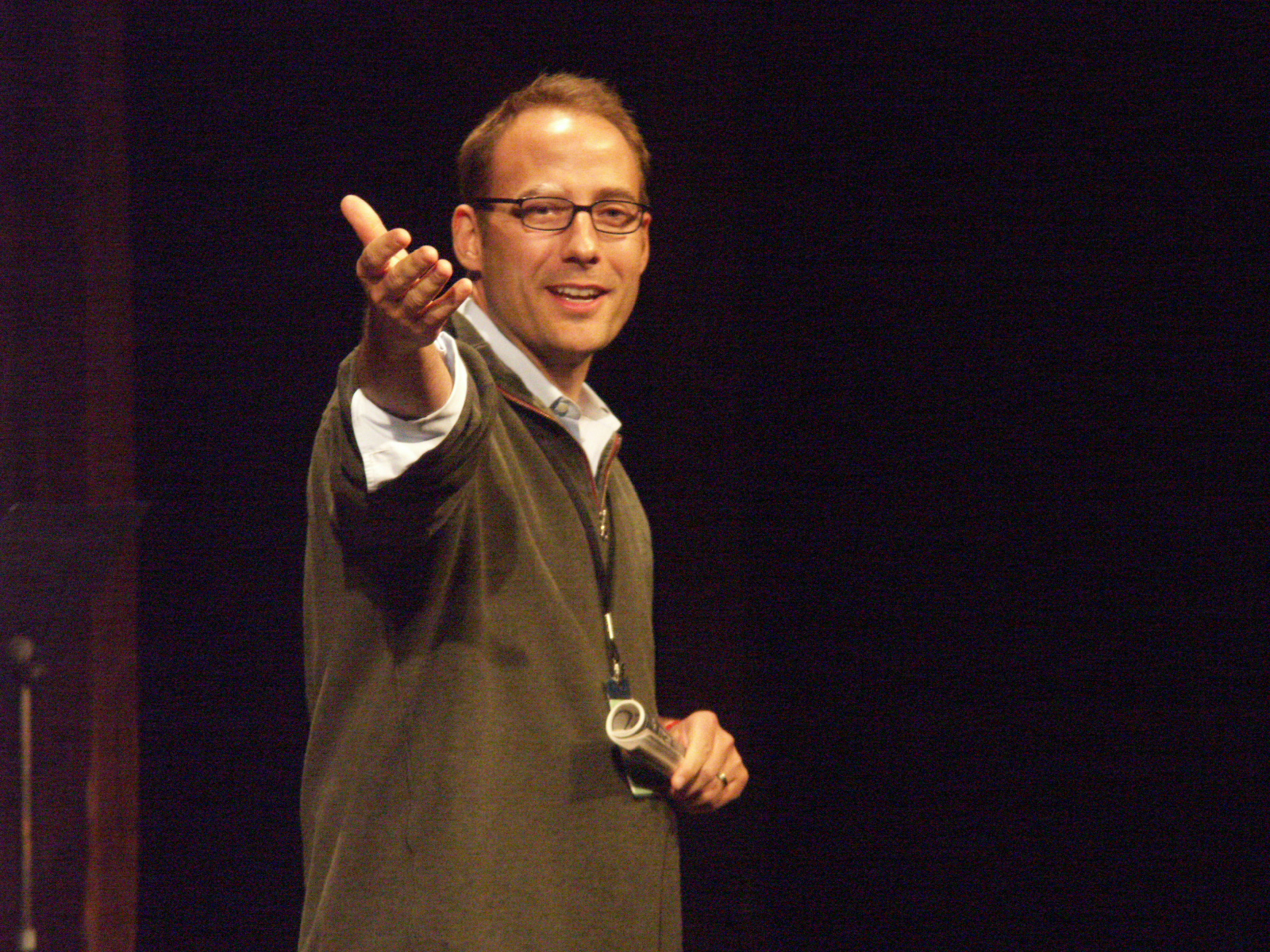
- Introducing In the Heights, at the Eugene O'Neill Theater Center, New London, Connecticut, US
- Born: 1969 (age 56–57)
- Occupations: director; artist

Richard Kuranda (born 1969) is an American director and artist of stage, cinema, and television. In November 2024, he celebrated his 18th anniversary as CEO of the Raue Center for the Arts in Crystal Lake, Illinois, and artistic director of Williams Street Repertory.

In 2018, the Raue Center and Williams Street Rep retired an US$8,800,000 debt under his leadership. While Kuranda was CEO at Raue, the board negotiated a subsidized lease at $100 per year with a 25-year corporate sponsorship from Home State Bank. This complemented an expansion of the center's physical plant to include a new school and outdoor theater space.

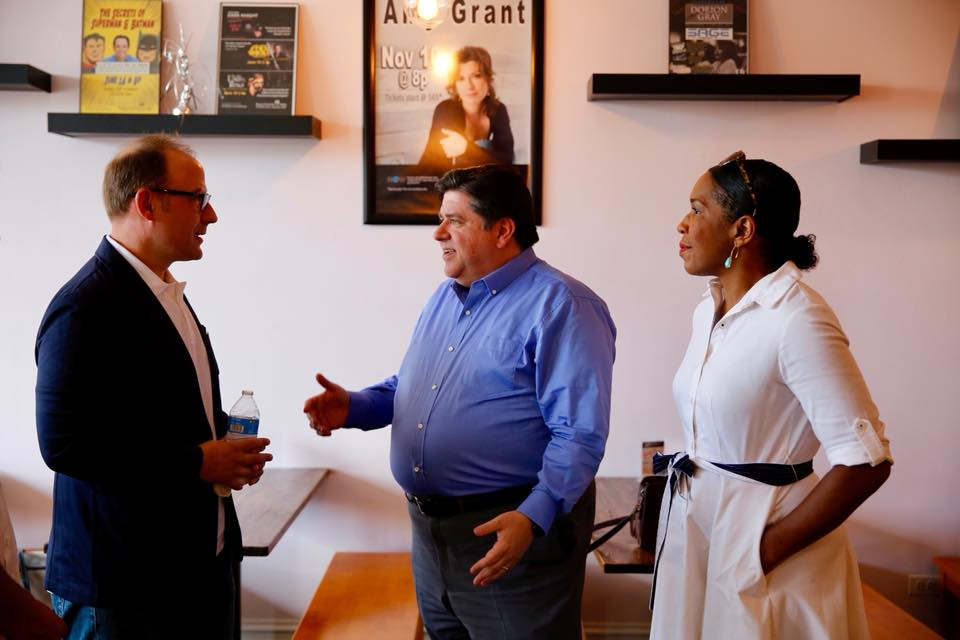
Richard Kuranda, Gov. Pritzker and Lt. Gov. Stratton

In 2005, The New York Times profiled Kuranda's artistic and producing work at the Eugene O'Neill Memorial Theater Center. At the time he was the youngest producing director of a Tony Award–winning theater and had just "turned around" the O'Neill by restoring its national programs. Halfway through his tenure at the O'Neill, Kuranda reversed the board's consolidation of programs, which led to a rebirth of the O'Neill.

== Biography ==
Born in 1969 in northeastern Pennsylvania, Kuranda was educated at the Jesuit Scranton Preparatory School, then attended West Virginia University on a scholarship before enrolling in the actors studio program at the New School University. He studied under Romulus Linney and Arthur Penn, earning two master's degrees. During his studies, he was mentored by Norman Mailer.

Kuranda's first professional film work was as a teenager, discovered by Pulitzer Prize–winning playwright Jason Miller. During his youth, Kuranda worked at the Scranton Theater for several years. His first professional theatrical work was at the New Jersey Shakespeare Festival. His film work includes a series of films with Bill Plympton, which are part of the MOMA permanent collection. Kuranda's collaboration with Plympton helped launch the budding New York Underground Film and Video Festival, helmed by Todd Phillips and Andrew Gurland. Kuranda's early work at the Actors Studio included, amongst others, a six-month exploration of Oedipus Rex with Al Pacino, Christopher Walken and Estelle Parsons. Lloyd Richards, Romulus Linney, Jack Temchin, and Kuranda were chronicled by the Village Voice as defining the Actors Studio Drama School during their tenure of productions at Circle in the Square Theater. Kuranda led the team at Epic Rep during a period of literary adaptations, which included commissioning Romulus Linney to adapt Tim O'Brien's National Book winner Going After Cacciatio.

He is the former producing director of the Eugene O'Neill Theater Center. He also was the center's interim artistic director for the O'Neill and all its programs. Kuranda was asked to lead the National Playwrights Conference and the center in 2004 after Ranelli resigned.

The New York Times stated that Kuranda restored confidence in the O'Neill's national programs by adding Michael Bush, Wendy C. Goldberg, and Oz Scott and reversing the decision of the previous leadership to combine all programs under one artistic office. James Houghton supported Kuranda through one of the most exhausting seasons of development.<NYTimes>

He was the Head of Operations at the Signature Theatre Company under James Houghton. Within a three-year period at the Epic, which he co-founded, Kuranda produced 24 off-Broadway plays, including works by David Auburn, JT Rogers, Romulus Linney, and Lee Blessing. Venues of production included the Dr2, the Peter Norton Space on 42nd Street, the Quintero (formerly the Kaufman), and the Public Theater. Kuranda was a principal at Elliott Associates, having opened doors to film production in his first three film projects.

He also was an advocate for the United Nations in conjunction with the Universal Forum of Cultures in Barcelona 2004. In 2025 he joined the Committee for the First Amendment.

Kuranda is a lifetime member of The Actors Studio and the former director of professional development for The Actors Studio Drama School at The New School, having replaced the retiring associate dean, Stephen Benedict. Kuranda was recruited from the Signature Theater to come back to the West Village institution by James Lipton. During his tenure at The New School, he led the team to expand the campus with the acquisition of the old Bell Laboratories at Westhbeth, which his team turned into one of the world's most important theater training centers in the world. The history of the space is noteworthy: it was here that the first talking movie, the condenser microphone, the first TV broadcast, and the first binary computer were demonstrated. The program was the third generation of Dramatic Workshop run by Erwin Piscator. He is a member of the Dramatists Guild and Stage Directors and Choreographers Society. Kuranda served as a mentor to the Kennedy center Arts In Crisis program. He was a member of the visiting committee to West Virginia University (arts) for eight years. Kuranda also was on the Board of the New School as a student representative for three years and as a senior director/representative for four years.

== Family ==
Kuranda and Alicia Regan met in graduate school in New York City. They worked on over 200 projects together over a 28-year relationship until her death in 2023. In recent years, Kuranda has focused on his family life and enjoys the small northwestern Crystal Lake, Illinois community.

== See also ==
- Ignaz Kuranda
