= Michael Schimmel Center for the Arts =

Principal theatre of Pace University

Coordinates: 40°42′38.79″N 74°0′16.56″W

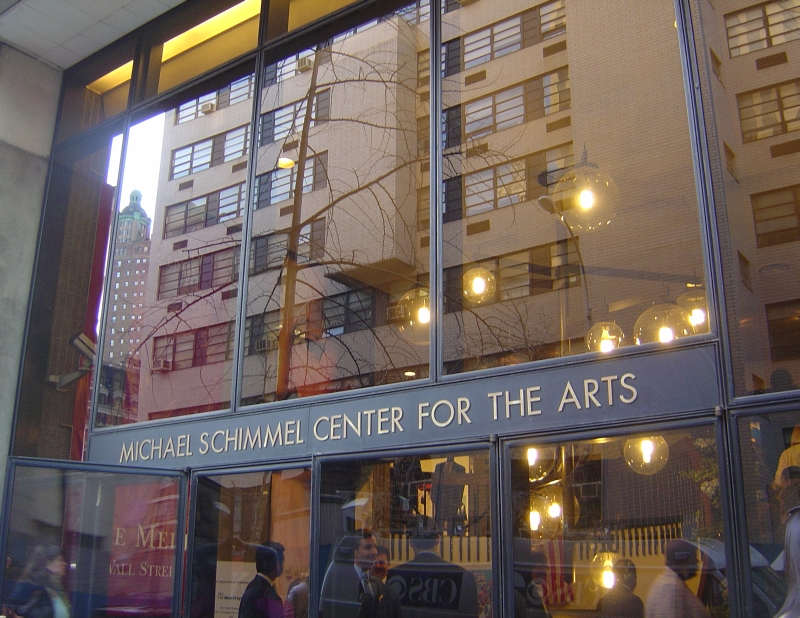
The main entrance on Spruce Street

The Michael Schimmel Center for the Arts was the principal theatre of Pace University and is located at the University's New York City campus in Lower Manhattan. Facing City Hall near the foot of the Brooklyn Bridge and blocks from the World Trade Center, it provided performance and assembly facilities to the university and the general public.

Named after Michael Schimmel, a longtime benefactor of the university, the center featured a 655-seat theater, one of the largest theaters in Lower Manhattan. The center presented drama, dance, comedy, jazz, classical music and cabaret. Beginning in September 2005, the center has been home to the television show Inside the Actors Studio.

In July 2023, the center closed as part of a major renovation to the One Pace Plaza building that will see the auditorium rebuilt into multiple smaller performing arts spaces.

== Events ==
The theater at Michael Schimmel Center for the Arts (view from the balcony)

From 2002 through 2004, the National Actors Theatre (NAT), founded by actor Tony Randall – dedicated to presenting classic works of theater and theatrical education delivered at no cost to the students or their schools, was housed at the center; the center was the site of Tony Randall's final performance, as the raisonneur Laudisi in a production of the Luigi Pirandello play Right You Are (if you think so). The Schimmel Center was a founding venue for both the Tribeca Film Festival and the short-lived Tribeca Theater Festival. The center has hosted events of the River-to-River Festival, the New York International Fringe Festival (FringeNYC), and numerous other productions. In 2005 the center presented the New York premiere of the Beijing People's Art Theatre's signature work Tea House. Between 2009 and 2011, Shakespeare's Globe Theatre (London) performed at the center.

Beginning in 2002, the Lower Manhattan Development Corporation (LMDC) has held regular public meetings at the Michael Schimmel Center for the Arts to discuss the future of Lower Manhattan and the World Trade Center. Most notably on January 13–14, 2003, the LMDC and the Port Authority of New York and New Jersey held an unprecedented public meeting at the Schimmel Center unveiling the nine possible plans for the World Trade Center site and memorial. Televised on NY1, the meeting was linked to Long Island and all five boroughs of the City of New York. New Yorkers had a chance to comment at any of six locations, broadcast simultaneously to each site; thousands more from around the globe participated online at the LMDC website.

In September 2003, the Democratic Party held a televised presidential candidates debate at the Schimmel Center. All ten declared Democratic candidates for the presidential nomination, including the first and only debate appearance by General Wesley Clark, participated. Other candidates were Howard Dean, John Edwards, Dick Gephardt, Bob Graham, John Kerry, Dennis Kucinich, Joseph Lieberman, Carol Moseley-Braun, and Al Sharpton.

In March 2005, the Democratic Policy Committee of the United States Senate held the kick-off event of the National Social Security Tour at Schimmel. The town meeting style event, which was covered by C-SPAN, included senators Hillary Clinton, Byron Dorgan, Richard Durbin, John Kerry, Frank Lautenberg, Harry Reid, and Charles Schumer.

In 2006, New York State Governor George E. Pataki and New York City Mayor Michael Bloomberg announced that the LMDC would award $27.4 million in cultural enhancement grants to 63 Lower Manhattan arts organizations and projects. Pace University's Michael Schimmel Center for the Arts was awarded $500,000 for renovations to improve public access for people with disabilities, enhance the lobby art gallery, and upgrade the theatre's technical and backstage facilities.

During the summer months of 2006, Pace University hosted three New York state candidate debates and three town hall meetings which were broadcast live by NY1.
