= Matthew Paul Olmos =

American dramatist

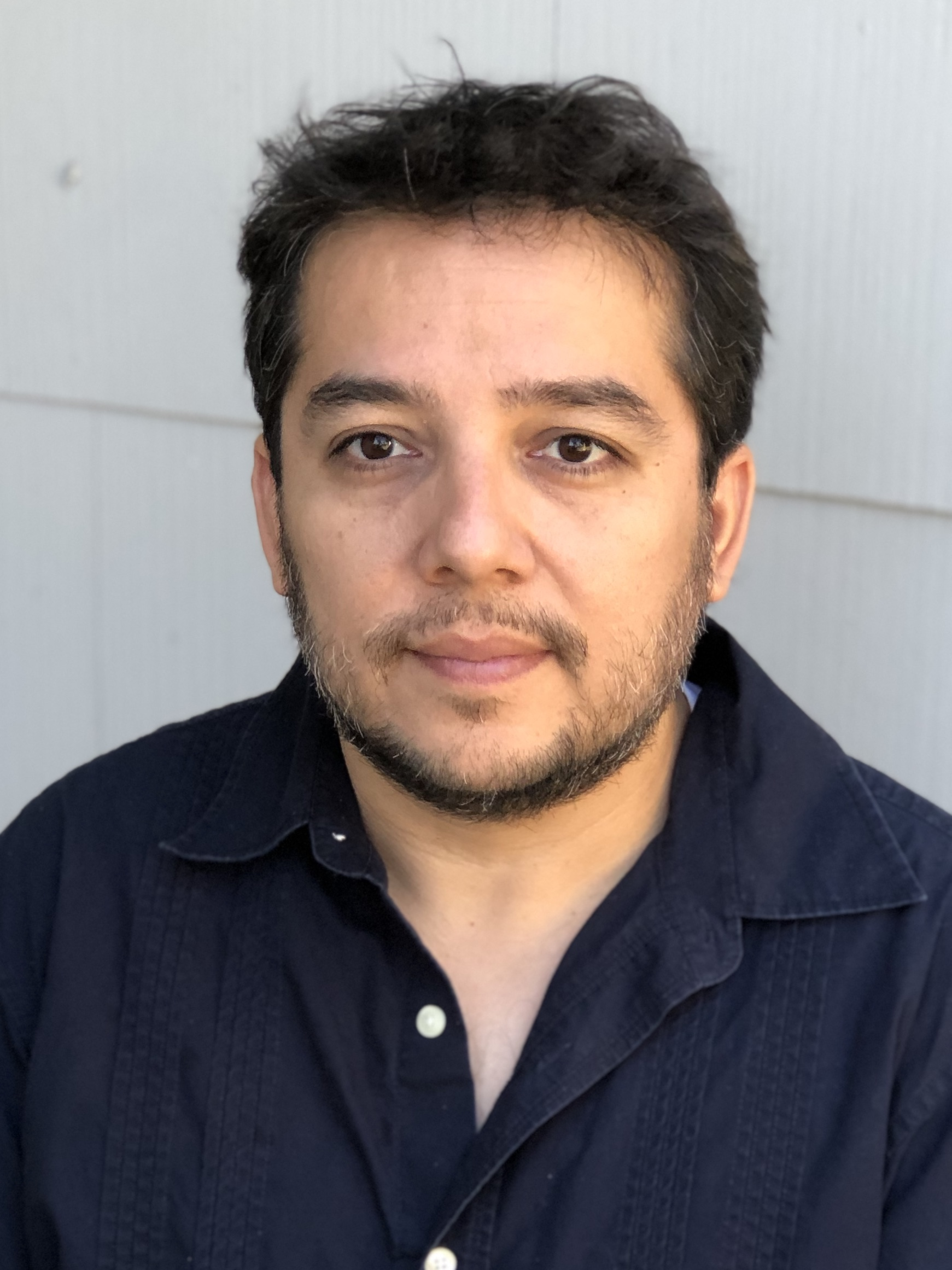
- Matthew Paul Olmos
- Born: October 14, 1977 (age 48); Montebello, California
- Education: University of California, Santa Barbara (BA) The New School for Drama (MFA)
- Occupations: Playwright, Screenwriter
- Website: www.matthewpaulolmos.com.

Matthew Paul Olmos is a Mexican-American playwright from Los Angeles, California. He is best known for his play a home what howls (or the house what was ravine), which premiered at Steppenwolf Theater in 2024; as well as so go the ghosts of mexico a three-play cycle about the US-Mexico drug wars which was selected for a production at La MaMa by Sam Shepard.

== Biography ==
Matthew Paul Olmos was born in Montebello, California to a police officer and Labor/Delivery nurse. Originally planning to write, direct and act in movies, Olmos was not exposed to theatre until his senior year of college when he took an Intro to Playwriting course. Olmos stayed an extra year and switched his major to receive a B.A in Playwriting, after his professor told him he had talent for playwriting.

Olmos moved to Brooklyn, New York in 2001 to pursue playwriting. He received his M.F.A in Playwriting from the New School of Drama in 2004.

== Career ==
In 2009, his play i put the fear of méxico in'em, which was developed while he was in residency at INTAR theatre got him selected as a Sundance Institute Time Warner Storytelling Fellow. Olmos worked at the Lark Play Development Center before quitting to be a full-time playwright. In 2012, Olmos was in residence at New Dramatists as part of his Princess Grace Fellowship. In 2013, Olmos was selected in the Ucross Foundation's Sundance Institute Theatre Program. In the same year, he received the inaugural Ellen Stewart Emerging Playwright Award.

== Accolades ==
- Sundance Institute Time Warner Storytelling Fellow (2009)
- Sam Shepard Selects Playwright Matthew Paul Olmos to Create New Work at La MaMa E.T.C. (2011)
- La MaMa e.t.c.'s Ellen Stewart Emerging Playwright Award (2012–13)
- Princess Grace Award in Playwriting (2012)
- Sundance Institute UCROSS Resident (2013)
- Sundance Institute Theater Lab (2014)
- Arizona Theatre Company's National Latino Playwriting Award (2015)
- Center Theatre Group L.A. Writers' Workshop (2017)
- Actors Theatre of Louisville 43rd Humana Festival of New American Plays Commission (2019)
- Geffen Playhouse Writers Room(2020)
- Drama League Award Nominee (2021)
- Playwrights' Center Core Writer (2022)
- Ensemble Studio Theatre Sloan Commission (2023)
- Dramatists Guild Inaugural Catalyst Fellowship (2023)

== Works ==
=== Full length plays ===
- that drive thru monterey
- sing it to the air, sing it to the ground, spill the wine, take that pearl
- Richie never slept, was always up, moving around at night
- a home what howls (or the house what was ravine)
- immorality may well be imagined
- three girls never learnt the way home
- the broken'hearts of a corrupted white house
- the shooters of an american president
- "i am a drop'dead gorgeous, fabulous, stylish, exotic'ass gem amongst thousands of rocks" by elliot rodger
- the living'life of the daughter mira
- The OLMOS FAMILY Play
- so go the ghosts of méxico, a brave woman in mexico
- so go the ghosts of méxico, the rise of azul
- so go the ghosts of méxico, a daughter sings the poet song
- i put the fear of méxico in'em
- The Nature of Captivity
- monkey
- nobody rides a locomotive no'mo
- the death of the slow'dying scuba diver

=== Essays ===
- Extraordinary Jokes with Saviana Stanescu
- The Elaborate Theater of Kristoffer Diaz
- The Broken Lines of Tommy Smith
- The Edge of Togetherness in Carla Ching
- The Past and Future Sunsets of Dominique Morisseau
- Jesus in India: Finding Out Who We Are with Lloyd Suh
- Young Jean Lee: Inviting Everyone into the Room, Straight White Men, Too
- The Reactions and Theatricals of Caitlin Saylor Stephens
