= Inside the Actors Studio =

American television talk show (1994–2019)

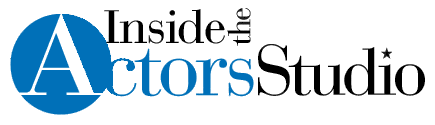
- Created by: James Lipton
- Presented by: James Lipton (1994–2018); Rotating list (2019)
- Theme music composer: Angelo Badalamenti
- Country of origin: United States
- Original language: English
- No. of seasons: 23
- No. of episodes: 277 (list of episodes)

Production
- Camera setup: Multi-camera
- Production companies: Triage Entertainment (2019)

Original release
- Network: Bravo (1994–2018); Ovation (2019)
- Release: June 12, 1994 – December 15, 2019

Inside the Actors Studio is an American talk show that premiered on Bravo on June 12, 1994, airing for 22 seasons, and was hosted by James Lipton from its premiere until 2018. It was taped at the Michael Schimmel Center for the Arts at Pace University's New York City campus.

On April 2, 2019, it was announced that the show would move to Ovation with the 23rd and final season premiering on October 13, 2019. Ovation acquired the rights to all previous seasons. The show concluded its run on December 15, 2019.

== History ==
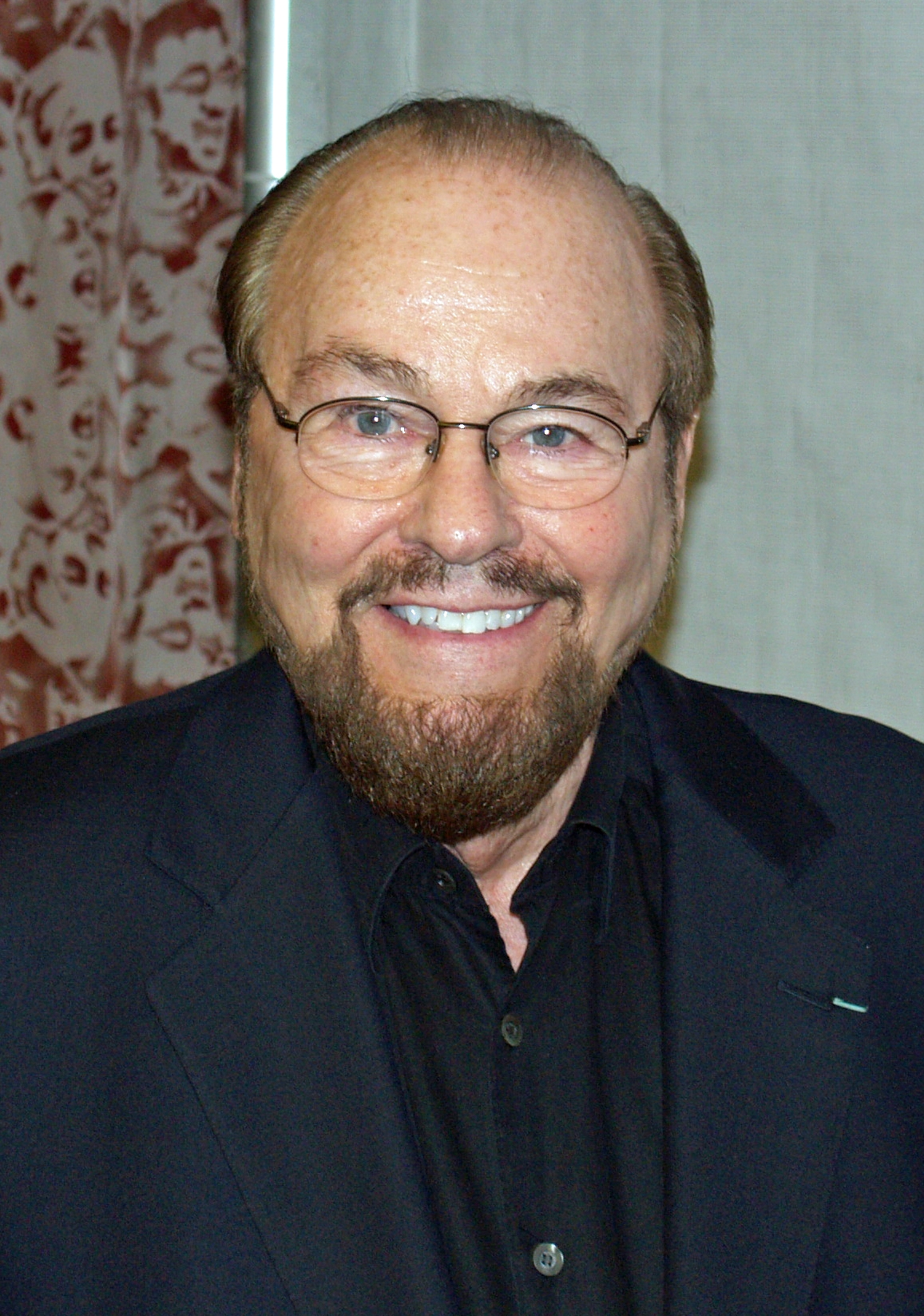
James Lipton

The program began as a televised craft seminar for students of the Actors Studio Drama School, originally a joint venture of the Actors Studio and New School University in 1994, with Paul Newman, a former Actors Studio president, as its first guest, and soon became Bravo's flagship program. At first taped at the New School's Tishman Auditorium in Greenwich Village, New York City, it was shifted subsequently to the Michael Schimmel Center for the Arts at Pace University's New York City campus. The program is presented as a seminar to students of the Actors Studio Drama School at Pace University.

The show deliberately uses a slower pace in the interviews as compared with a typical celebrity interview, thus cameras usually record a couple of hours of conversation, later edited to one or two hours. The result, as a New York Times article expressed it, "In Mr. Lipton's guest chair, actors cease being stars for a while and become artists and teachers." Though sometimes, some interviews go longer; Steven Spielberg's 1999 visit, for example, stretched to four hours, and was later shown as two episodes of one hour each. The interviews were guided by Lipton's trademark index-card questions, which sometimes revealed his well-researched knowledge of guests' lives, often startling some. On one such occasion, Billy Crystal told Lipton, "You know you're scary, don't you?" On another occasion, Martin Sheen asked Lipton, "How do you know all this? This is extraordinary." And Sir Anthony Hopkins, upon learning that Lipton knew the exact address where the former had been born and raised in Wales, turned to the audience and remarked, "He's a detective, you know."

In May 2005, the contract between the Actors Studio and New School University was not renewed. Beginning with the 12th season, in the fall of 2005, the program was taped at the Michael Schimmel Center for the Arts at Pace University's New York City campus. The show featured a new set with a gritty backstage feel, designed by Will Rothfuss for Blair Broadcast Designs, and The Actors Studio Drama School at Pace University re-opened in new facilities.

James Lipton with guest Angelina Jolie. The majority of the show is held as a one-on-one interview.

Since its premiere, Inside the Actors Studio had over 300 guests. The first episode's guest was Paul Newman (Alec Baldwin was the first guest, but his interview was broadcast after Newman's). The guests have included 74 Academy Award winners: eight directors; four screenwriters; 61 actors and actresses; and three composers. For its 200th show, Lipton became the guest subject of the show. He was questioned by Dave Chappelle, whom he picked personally. The show ended with the Pace University provost announcing that the college was sponsoring a scholarship in Chappelle's name to his high school alma mater. Based on the show, James Lipton published a book titled Inside Inside in 2007. In September 2018, Lipton declared that he was stepping down from the program after 23 seasons. Starting in 2019, the show was hosted by different celebrities.

In his review of the program, The Sunday Times critic A.A. Gill wrote: "The format is simple and idiotically inspired. The Actors Studio is the New York drama school made famous by Stanislavsky and his method (although the series is now filmed elsewhere). These shows are thinly set-up masterclasses for students. The cleverness is in the vanity it allows the guests, who are the very greatest and most self-regarding performers and creators of theatre and film. People who are too grand to talk to anyone will talk to Inside the Actors Studio. They believe they're giving something back, offering precious pearls of insight to a new generation. And who doesn't look good passing it on to adoring students? In truth, it's just a chat show on satellite, but the veil of education and posterity is held decorously high, so everybody turns up and talks with a smile."

While most of the show is a one-on-one interview conducted by the host (Lipton in the first 22 seasons, rotating hosts since season 23), this is followed by the host submitting a questionnaire to the guest. The questionnaire concept was originated by French television personality Bernard Pivot on his show Apostrophes, after the Proust Questionnaire. The 10 questions Lipton asks are:

1. What is your favorite word?
2. What is your least favorite word?
3. What turns you on?
4. What turns you off?
5. What sound or noise do you love?
6. What sound or noise do you hate?
7. What is your favorite curse word?
8. What profession other than your own would you like to attempt?
9. What profession would you not like to do?
10. If heaven exists, what would you like to hear God say when you arrive at the pearly gates?

The program usually concludes with a question-and-answer session with the students.

In France, the show has been broadcast since 1999 on Paris Première, with French subtitles.

== In popular culture ==
The show has been good-naturedly lampooned for original host James Lipton's paused and somewhat clipped delivery on Saturday Night Live, in which Will Ferrell portrayed Lipton interviewing himself as an annoyed guest. He was also spoofed on The Simpsons, where character Rainier Wolfcastle (a parody of Arnold Schwarzenegger) shoots his interviewer and a dying Lipton croaks, "It's a pleasure to eat your lead, good sir." In another episode of The Simpsons, in which Homer donates a kidney, he single-mindedly rushes his family home so he can watch the Inside The Actors Studio interview of F. Murray Abraham. Ferrell, with his Old School co-stars Vince Vaughn, Luke Wilson and director Todd Phillips, again portrayed a satirical version of Lipton in a skit called "Inside the Actors Studio Spoof", which can be seen as part of the DVD release special features for the film. Ferrell appears as himself and answers questions poking fun at some of his less successful films, such as A Night at the Roxbury, in what is obviously a comedic take on Lipton's reverential approach to his interviewees. Comedian Will Sasso portrayed Lipton on Mad TV and David Cross parodied him as Cyrus on Mr Show. Weird Al Yankovic's song "Couch Potato" describes "James Lipton discussing the oeuvre of Mr. Rob Schneider." among other things on TV. In the Mystery Science Theater 3000 episode "Werewolf," Mike Nelson hits his head and thinks he is James Lipton.

== Guests ==
=== Individual ===
Guest list for the show sorted alphabetically by last name. For a full list, see List of Inside the Actors Studio episodes.

=== A ===
- Amy Adams
- Ben Affleck
- Alan Alda
- Tim Allen
- Jennifer Aniston
- Judd Apatow
- Will Arnett
- Hank Azaria

=== B ===
- Lauren Bacall
- Alec Baldwin (twice)
- Antonio Banderas
- Ellen Barkin
- Roseanne Barr
- Drew Barrymore
- Kim Basinger
- Jason Bateman
- Kathy Bates
- Ned Beatty
- Halle Berry
- Juliette Binoche
- Jack Black
- Cate Blanchett
- Jon Bon Jovi
- Alex Borstein
- Julie Bowen
- Peter Boyle
- Jeff Bridges
- Matthew Broderick
- Josh Brolin
- Pierce Brosnan
- David Bryan
- Carol Burnett
- Ty Burrell
- Ellen Burstyn
- Gabriel Byrne

=== C ===
- James Caan
- Nicolas Cage
- Michael Caine
- James Cameron
- Steve Carell
- George Carlin
- Jim Carrey
- Nancy Cartwright
- Dan Castellaneta
- Stockard Channing
- Dave Chappelle (only artist to appear 3 times - 2005, 2008, 2013)
- Jessica Chastain
- Don Cheadle
- George Clooney
- Lauren Cohan
- Glenn Close
- Chris Colfer
- Jennifer Connelly
- Bradley Cooper (twice) (Note: Bradley Cooper was the first guest to have attended the Actors Studio as a student. ( "Cooper talks to Stern about the Actors Studio". YouTube. April 25, 2021.))
- Francis Ford Coppola
- Kevin Costner
- Bryan Cranston
- Russell Crowe
- Tom Cruise
- Billy Crystal (twice)
- John Cusack

=== D ===
- Willem Dafoe (twice)
- Matt Damon
- Jeff Daniels
- Ted Danson
- Geena Davis
- Viola Davis
- Benicio del Toro
- Robert De Niro
- Bruce Dern
- Laura Dern (twice)
- Johnny Depp
- Danny DeVito
- Cameron Diaz
- Matt Dillon
- Stanley Donen
- Michael Douglas
- Robert Downey Jr.
- Richard Dreyfuss
- David Duchovny
- Olympia Dukakis
- Faye Dunaway
- Lena Dunham
- Robert Duvall

=== E ===
- Clint Eastwood

=== F ===
- Peter Falk
- Jesse Tyler Ferguson
- Tina Fey
- Sally Field
- Ralph Fiennes
- Colin Firth
- Laurence Fishburne
- Jane Fonda
- Harrison Ford
- Jodie Foster
- Michael J. Fox (with Tracy Pollan)
- Jamie Foxx
- James Franco
- Morgan Freeman

=== G ===
- James Gandolfini
- Andy Garcia
- Danai Gurira
- Brad Garrett
- Richard Gere
- Ricky Gervais
- Danny Glover
- William Goldman
- Whoopi Goldberg
- Cuba Gooding Jr.
- John Goodman
- Hugh Grant
- Lee Grant
- Seth Green
- Melanie Griffith
- Jake Gyllenhaal

=== H ===
- Gene Hackman
- Jon Hamm
- Tom Hanks (twice)
- Alyson Hannigan
- Mariska Hargitay
- Ed Harris
- Jared Harris
- Neil Patrick Harris (twice)
- Teri Hatcher
- Ethan Hawke
- Goldie Hawn
- Salma Hayek
- Sean Hayes
- Patricia Heaton
- Christina Hendricks
- Mike Henry
- Dustin Hoffman
- Philip Seymour Hoffman
- Anthony Hopkins (twice)
- Dennis Hopper
- Ron Howard
- Kate Hudson
- Helen Hunt
- Holly Hunter
- John Hurt
- Mitchell Hurwitz
- Anjelica Huston

=== I ===
- Jeremy Irons

=== J ===
- Hugh Jackman (twice)
- Anne Jackson (with Eli Wallach)
- Samuel L. Jackson
- Allison Janney
- Norman Jewison
- Billy Joel
- Scarlett Johansson
- Elton John
- Angelina Jolie
- January Jones
- Tommy Lee Jones

=== K ===
- Vincent Kartheiser
- Julie Kavner
- Harvey Keitel
- Val Kilmer (twice)
- Ben Kingsley
- Jemima Kirke
- Kevin Kline

=== L ===
- Martin Landau
- Diane Lane
- Nathan Lane
- Jessica Lange
- Anthony LaPaglia
- Queen Latifah
- Hugh Laurie
- Jude Law
- Martin Lawrence
- Denis Leary
- Spike Lee
- Jennifer Jason Leigh
- Jack Lemmon
- Jay Leno
- Jerry Lewis
- Laura Linney
- James Lipton (Note: James Lipton's episode was hosted by previous guest Dave Chappelle.)
- Jennifer Lopez
- Julia Louis-Dreyfus
- Sidney Lumet
- Jane Lynch

=== M ===
- Seth MacFarlane
- Shirley MacLaine
- William H. Macy
- Zosia Mamet
- Leslie Mann
- Mary Stuart Masterson
- Matthew McConaughey
- Eric McCormack
- Ian McKellen
- Christopher Meloni
- S. Epatha Merkerson
- Debra Messing
- Lea Michele
- Bette Midler
- Arthur Miller
- Liza Minnelli
- Mo'Nique
- Cory Monteith
- Julianne Moore
- Mary Tyler Moore
- Jeanne Moreau
- Matthew Morrison
- Megan Mullally
- Eddie Murphy
- Ryan Murphy
- Mike Myers (twice)

=== N ===
- Liam Neeson
- Paul Newman
- Mike Nichols
- Chris Noth
- Edward Norton

=== O ===
- Conan O'Brien
- Rosie O'Donnell
- Ed O'Neill
- David Oyelowo

=== P ===
- Al Pacino (twice)
- Gwyneth Paltrow
- Sarah Jessica Parker (twice)
- Estelle Parsons
- Jim Parsons
- Arthur Penn
- Sean Penn
- Bernadette Peters
- Michelle Pfeiffer
- Brad Pitt
- Amy Poehler
- Sydney Pollack
- Tracy Pollan (with Michael J. Fox)
- Natalie Portman

=== Q ===
- Dennis Quaid
- Anthony Quinn

=== R ===
- Daniel Radcliffe
- Josh Radnor
- Robert Redford
- Vanessa Redgrave
- Norman Reedus
- Christopher Reeve
- Burt Reynolds
- Tim Robbins
- Doris Roberts
- Julia Roberts
- Chris Rock
- Ray Romano
- Diana Ross
- Portia de Rossi
- Mickey Rourke
- Mark Ruffalo
- Meg Ryan
- Mark Rydell

=== S ===
- Richie Sambora
- Susan Sarandon
- Robert Schneider
- Martin Scorsese
- Kyra Sedgwick
- Jason Segel
- Alia Shawkat
- Harry Shearer
- Charlie Sheen
- Martin Sheen
- Brooke Shields
- Kiernan Shipka
- Martin Short
- Sarah Silverman
- Neil Simon
- Gary Sinise
- Christian Slater
- John Slattery
- Yeardley Smith
- Will Smith
- Cobie Smulders
- Stephen Sondheim
- Sissy Spacek
- Kevin Spacey
- Steven Spielberg
- Sylvester Stallone
- Ben Stiller
- Sharon Stone
- Eric Stonestreet
- Susan Stroman
- Meryl Streep
- Barbra Streisand
- Donald Sutherland
- Kiefer Sutherland
- Hilary Swank

=== T ===
- Jeffrey Tambor
- Tico Torres
- Charlize Theron
- Billy Bob Thornton
- John Travolta

=== V ===
- Sofía Vergara

=== W ===
- Mark Wahlberg
- Christopher Walken
- Eli Wallach (with Anne Jackson)
- Jessica Walter
- Barbara Walters
- Naomi Watts
- Sigourney Weaver
- Matthew Weiner
- Kristen Wiig
- Forest Whitaker
- Betty White
- Gene Wilder
- Allison Williams
- Robin Williams
- Bruce Willis
- Debra Winger
- Henry Winkler
- Kate Winslet
- Shelley Winters
- Dick Wolf
- Alfre Woodard
- James Woods
- Joanne Woodward

=== Y ===
- Steven Yeun

=== Z ===
- Renée Zellweger

Cast notes

=== Ensemble ===
- Cast of Everybody Loves Raymond: Ray Romano, Patricia Heaton, Brad Garrett, Doris Roberts, and Peter Boyle
- Cast of Family Guy: Seth MacFarlane, Alex Borstein, Seth Green and Mike Henry
  - Mila Kunis, who plays Meg Griffin, had a schedule conflict and was unavailable.
- Casts of Law & Order: creator Dick Wolf, Chris Noth (Law & Order; Law & Order: Criminal Intent), S. Epatha Merkerson (Law & Order)
  - Christopher Meloni (Law & Order: Special Victims Unit) had to leave before his interview during the taping because of an illness he had that day, he was edited out of the introduction since he was not able to be interviewed during the show.
- Cast of The Producers musical: director Susan Stroman, Nathan Lane, Matthew Broderick
- Cast of The Simpsons: Dan Castellaneta, Julie Kavner, Nancy Cartwright, Yeardley Smith, Hank Azaria, and Harry Shearer
  - Kavner left in the middle of the show without an on-air explanation, leaving an empty chair for much of the show, until it was removed during a commercial break. When James Lipton appeared on The Simpsons season 13 DVD audio commentary (Episode "The Sweetest Apu"), he explained that Kavner was scheduled to go to Shelter Island on Long Island on an 11:15pm ferry, so she had to leave. Although Kavner is known for not approving of doing her Marge Simpson voice in person, she did perform the voice (as well as that of Patty and Selma Bouvier) while hiding her face behind a cardboard cutout of Marge's face although the final broadcast showed clips of the character as well as the characters portrayed by the other actors while they did their voices.
- Cast of Will & Grace: Debra Messing, Eric McCormack, Sean Hayes, and Megan Mullally
- Members of Bon Jovi: Jon Bon Jovi, Richie Sambora, David Bryan and Tico Torres
- Cast of Modern Family: Ed O'Neill, Sofia Vergara, Julie Bowen, Ty Burrell, Jesse Tyler Ferguson, and Eric Stonestreet
- Cast of Glee: Lea Michele, Cory Monteith, Chris Colfer, Jane Lynch, Matthew Morrison, and creator Ryan Murphy
- Cast of Mad Men: Jon Hamm, January Jones, Vincent Kartheiser, Christina Hendricks, Kiernan Shipka, John Slattery, Jared Harris, and Matthew Weiner
- Cast of Arrested Development: Mitchell Hurwitz, Jason Bateman, Portia de Rossi, Will Arnett, Alia Shawkat, Jeffrey Tambor, and Jessica Walter
- Cast of How I Met Your Mother: Josh Radnor, Jason Segel, Cobie Smulders, Neil Patrick Harris, and Alyson Hannigan.
- Cast of The Walking Dead: Lauren Cohan, Danai Gurira, Norman Reedus, and Steven Yeun.
- Cast of Girls: Lena Dunham, Jemima Kirke, Zosia Mamet, and Allison Williams.

=== Declined invitations ===
- In January 2013, Jennifer Lawrence declined the chance to appear on the show, citing her youth and lack of experience.
- From the show's beginnings, Lipton had tried to persuade Marlon Brando to come on the show. Although a charter member of the Actors Studio, Brando flatly refused; speaking in a 2012 interview, it was the only such categorical rejection Lipton could recall:

[B]y the time I started the show -- although he was a member of the Actor's Studio and had been trained by Stella Adler as I was; we knew each other, and we used to talk on the phone for hours at a time -- but by that time he was already reclusive. I couldn't get him out of the house and neither could anyone else.

== Home media ==
Selected episodes of the show have been released by Shout! Factory. Three DVDs containing a single episode each feature Robin Williams, Johnny Depp, Dave Chappelle and Barbra Streisand. Two compilation sets were also released. Leading Men features Robert De Niro, Al Pacino, Sean Penn, and Russell Crowe. Icons features Clint Eastwood, Paul Newman, Robert Redford, and Barbra Streisand.

== Accolades ==
The show has been nominated for 18 Emmy awards, winning once (in 2013).
