= James Lipton =

American writer, actor, and host (1926–2020)

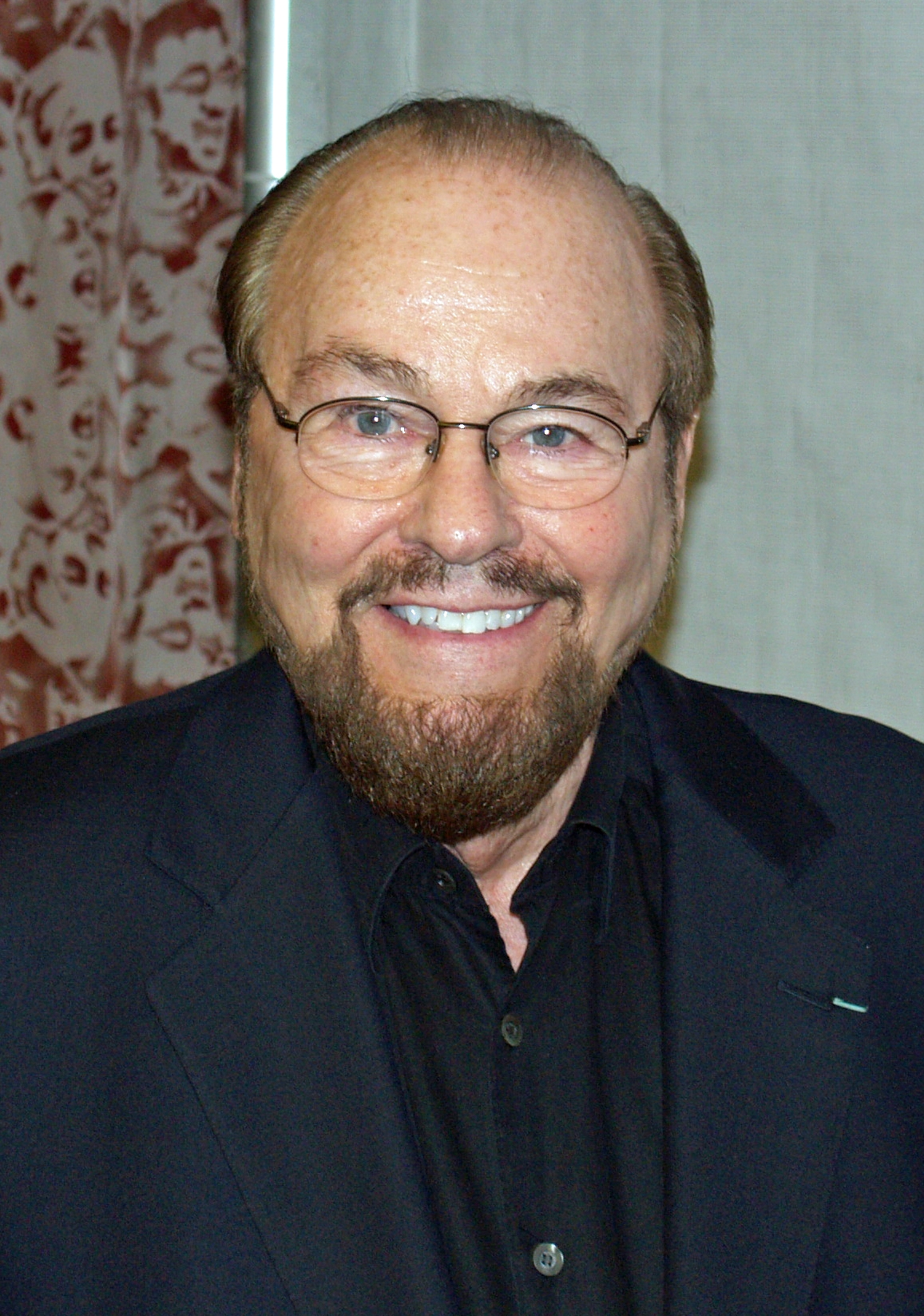
- Lipton in 2007
- Born: Louis James Lipton; September 19, 1926; Detroit, Michigan, U.S.
- Died: March 2, 2020 (aged 93); New York City, New York, U.S.
- Occupations: Host; writer; producer; actor; teacher
- Years active: 1944–2018
- Notable work: Creator and host of Inside the Actors Studio
- Spouses: Shirley Blanc (m. 1947, divorced); Nina Foch (m. 1954; div. 1959); Kedakai Turner (m. 1970)
- Father: Lawrence Lipton

Louis James Lipton (September 19, 1926 – March 2, 2020) was an American writer, actor, talk show host, and dean emeritus of the Actors Studio Drama School at Pace University in New York City. He was the executive producer, writer, and host of the Bravo cable television series Inside the Actors Studio, which debuted in 1994. He retired from the show in 2018.

== Early life ==
Louis James Lipton was born on September 19, 1926, in Detroit, Michigan, the only child of Betty (née Weinberg), a teacher and librarian, and Lawrence Lipton, a journalist and beat poet. Known for writing the Beat Generation chronicle The Holy Barbarians, Lawrence was a graphic designer, a columnist for the Jewish Daily Forward, and a publicity director for a movie theater. Lawrence was a Polish Jewish emigrant (from Łódź), whose surname was originally Lipschitz. Betty's parents were Russian Jews. His parents divorced when Lipton was six, and his father abandoned the family.

Lipton's family struggled financially, and he started to work when he was 13 years old. He worked in high school as a newspaper copy boy for the Detroit Times and as an actor in the Catholic Theater of Detroit and in radio. Lipton had initially intended to become an attorney. After graduating from Central High School in Detroit, he attended Wayne State University for one year in the mid-1940s and enlisted in the United States Army Air Forces. In an interview with Vanity Fair, Lipton talked about his time in Paris in the 1950s, when he worked as a pimp for about a year. On the Today show, Lipton clarified that he had worked as a beneficent maquereau in the regulated prostitution business.

== Career ==
Shortly after graduating high school, Lipton portrayed Dan Reid, the Lone Ranger's nephew, on WXYZ Radio's The Lone Ranger. He initially studied to be a lawyer in New York City, and turned to acting to finance his education. From 1952 to 1962, Lipton starred in The Guiding Light, playing the role of Dr. Dick Grant and eventually becoming head writer. He wrote for several soap operas: Another World, The Edge of Night, The Best of Everything, Return to Peyton Place and Capitol. Lipton studied for two and a half years with Stella Adler, four years with Harold Clurman, and two years with Robert Lewis. He also started studying voice and dance (including modern dance and classical ballet), and choreographed a ballet for the American Ballet Theatre.

In 1951, he appeared in the Broadway play The Autumn Garden by Lillian Hellman. He portrayed a shipping clerk turned gang member in Joseph Strick's 1953 film, The Big Break, a crime drama.

He wrote the book and lyrics for the 1962 Broadway musical Nowhere To Go But Up. The show had its tryout in Philadelphia at the Shubert Theatre opening October 6, 1962, to mixed notices. The show opened in New York on November 10, 1962, at the Winter Garden, to generally unfavorable reviews. John Chapman wrote in the New York Daily News that the show "is delicious bathtub gin. . . . This is a happy show." But Howard Taubman said in The New York Times: "Don't let anyone tell you that 'Nowhere to Go but Up' is a little horror. Because it's a big one." As a result, Kermit Bloomgarden, the producer, decided to close the show on November 17, 1962, after nine performances. A group of 234 small investors tried to keep the show from closing by parading in front of the theater and sought an injunction, but the NY Supreme Court ruled in favor of the producer.

He was the librettist and lyricist for the short-lived 1967 Broadway musical Sherry!, based on the Moss Hart and George S. Kaufman play The Man Who Came to Dinner, with music by his childhood friend Laurence Rosenthal. The score and orchestrations were lost for more than thirty years, and the original cast was never recorded. In 2003, a studio cast recording (with Nathan Lane, Bernadette Peters, Carol Burnett, Tommy Tune, Mike Myers and others) renewed interest in the show.

His book, An Exaltation of Larks, was first published in 1968, and has been in print and revised several times since then, including a 1993 Penguin Books edition. The book is a collection of "terms of venery", both real and created by Lipton himself. The dust jacket biography for the first edition of Exaltation said his activities included fencing, swimming, and equestrian pursuits and that he had written two Broadway productions.

Lipton was a writer and producer of The Stars Salute Israel at 30, an ABC 1978 television special celebrating the 30th anniversary of the state of Israel. In 1981, Lipton published his novel, Mirrors, about dancers' lives. He later wrote and produced it as a made-for-television movie. For the genre of television, Lipton produced some two dozen specials including: twelve Bob Hope Birthday Specials; The Road to China, an NBC entertainment special produced in China; and the first televised presidential inaugural gala (for Jimmy Carter).

In 2004, 2005, 2013, and 2019, Lipton appeared on several episodes of Arrested Development as Warden Stefan Gentles. In 2008, he provided the voice for the Director in the Disney animation film Bolt. He played "himself" as Brain Wash, interviewer of the monster Eva's acting teacher in the Paris-Vietnam animated film Igor. Lipton also appears twice in the same episode of Family Guy in cutaways where he simply says "Improv!" both times.

=== Inside the Actors Studio ===
In the early 1990s, Lipton was inspired by Bernard Pivot and sought to create a three-year educational program for actors that would be a distillation of what he had learned in the 12 years of his own intensive studies. In 1994, he arranged for the Actors Studio—the home base of "method acting" in the United States—to join with New York City's New School University and form the Actors Studio Drama School, a formal degree-granting program at the graduate level. After ending its contract with the New School, the Actors Studio established the Actors Studio Drama School at Pace University in 2006.

Lipton created a project within the Actors Studio Drama School: a non-credit class called Inside the Actors Studio (1994), where successful and accomplished actors, directors and writers would be interviewed and would answer questions from acting students. These sessions were also taped, edited, and broadcast on television for the general public to see. The episodes were viewed in 89 million homes throughout 125 countries. Lipton hosted the show and conducted the main interview. In a 2008 interview, when asked if he had anticipated the show's success, Lipton responded, "Not in my wildest imaginations. It was a joint, arduous effort involving many people. At a point and time not too distant in the past, I had three lives. I was the dean of the Actors Studio, the writer of the series, its host and executive producer. I maintained a preposterous sixteen-hour schedule." He was awarded France's Ordre des Arts et des Lettres in 2014 for his work on the show.

Lipton's last Inside the Actors Studio, an interview with Ted Danson, aired on January 11, 2018. In September 2018, Lipton stated that he was stepping down from the program after more than 24 years.

== Personal life ==
He first married Shirley Blanc in 1947.

Between 1954 and 1959, Lipton was married to actress Nina Foch.

He was married to Kedakai Turner Lipton, a model and real estate broker, from 1970 until his death. Turner was known as the model playing Miss Scarlet on the cover of an edition of the boardgame Clue. She was the book and illustration designer for Lipton's book, An Exaltation of Larks, The Ultimate Edition.

In the 200th episode of Inside the Actors Studio, Lipton stated that he was an atheist.

Lipton stated in interviews that he was a pilot, certified in Airplane Single Engine Land planes. He had been flying since 1980 and learned in a Cessna 152 and 172, at Van Nuys Airport. As of 2013, he had logged more than 1,000 hours of flight time. Lipton was a member of the Aircraft Owners and Pilots Association.

=== Death ===
Lipton died of bladder cancer at his home in Manhattan on March 2, 2020, at the age of 93.

== Filmography ==
=== Films ===
Year	Title	Role	Notes	Ref.
1953	The Big Break	Marty		
2005	Bewitched	Himself		
2008	Igor	Himself	Voice	
2008	Bolt	The Director	Voice	

=== Television ===
Year	Title	Role	Notes	Ref.
1951	Pulitzer Prize Playhouse	Himself	Episode: "The Silver Cord"	
1951	Armstrong Circle Theatre	Himself	Episode: "Mountain Song"	
1952	CBS Television Workshop	Himself	Episode: "My Eyes Have a Cold Nose"	
1952–1962	The Web	young fugitive	Episode: "The Boy in the Front Row"	
1952–1962	You Are There	Michelangelo	Episode: "The Recognition of Michelangelo"	
1953	Guiding Light	Dr. Dick Grant	3 episodes	
1954	Inner Sanctum	Tony	Episode: "Guilty Secret"	
1954	The Goldbergs	Lotzi	Episode: "August 10, 1954"	
1994–2018	Inside the Actors Studio	Himself	Creator, writer, Executive Producer, Host	
2002, 2011	The Simpsons	Himself	2 episodes	
2004–2005, 2013, 2019	Arrested Development	Warden Stefan Gentles	6 episodes, (final appearance)	
2005	Cold Squad	Uniform Cop	Episode: "Borders"	
2006	Joey	Himself	Episode: "Joey and the Actors Studio "	
2008	According to Jim	Devil	Episode: "The Devil Went Down to Oak Park"	
2009	Family Guy	Himself	Episode: "Spies Reminiscent of Us"	
2009	Saturday Night Live	Himself	Episode: "Bradley Cooper/TV on the Radio"	
2012	Celebrity Apprentice	Himself	Episode: "Getting Medieval"	
2012	Glee	Himself	Episode: "Goodbye"	
2012	Suburgatory	Dr. Richard Rohl	Episode: "Down Time"	

=== As producer ===
Year	Title	Role	Ref.
1977	Jimmy Carter's Inaugural Gala	Executive producer	
1978	Happy Birthday, Bob	Executive producer	
1979	Bob Hope on the Road to China	Producer	
1981	American Dance Machine Presents a Celebration of Broadway Dance	Executive producer	
1985	Mirrors	Producer	
1987	Bob Hope Salutes the U.S.F. 40th Anniversary	Executive producer	
1988	Happy Birthday, Bob: 50 Stars Salute Your 50 Years with NBC	Executive producer	
1989	Bob Hope's Birthday Spectacular in Paris	Executive producer	
1994–2018	Inside the Actors Studio	Executive producer	

=== As writer ===
Year	Title	Role	Notes	Ref.
1952	Guiding Light	Head writer	January 6 – April 18, 1975	
1956	The Edge of Night	Writer		
1960	The United States Steel Hour	Writer	Episode: "The Charlie and the Kid"	
1963	The Doctors	Writer		
1965	Another World	Head writer	March 17 – November 5, 1965	
1970	The Best of Everything	Head writer		
1972	Return to Peyton Place	Head writer		
1978	Happy Birthday, Bob	Writer		
1979	All-Star Birthday Party for Bob Hope... at Sea	Writer		
1982	All-Star Birthday Party at Annapolis	Writer		
1985	Mirrors	Writer		
1985	Copacabana	Writer	Teleplay story and teleplay	
1984–1987	Capitol	Head writer		
1987	Bob Hope Salutes the U.S.F. 40th Anniversary	Writer		
1989	Bob Hope's Birthday Spectacular in Paris	Writer		
1994–2018	Inside the Actors Studio	Writer		

== Published works ==
- Lipton, James (1968). An Exaltation of Larks: or The "Venereal" Game. Viking USA. ISBN 978-0670300440.
- Lipton, James (1981). Mirrors. St Martins Press. ISBN 978-0312534387.
- Lipton, James (1991). An Exaltation of Larks: The Ultimate Edition. Viking USA. ISBN 978-0670300440.
- Lipton, James (1993). An Exaltation of Business and Finance. Villard Books. ISBN 978-0679418696.
- Lipton, James (1993). An Exaltation of Home and Family. Villard Books. ISBN 978-0679418719.
- Lipton, James (1993). An Exaltation of Romance & Revelry. Villard Books. ISBN 978-0679418726.
- Lipton, James (2007). Inside Inside. Dutton. ISBN 978-0525950356.

== See also ==
- List of awards and nominations received by James Lipton
